= Joining of the Archdiocese of Russian Orthodox Churches in Western Europe to the Moscow Patriarchate =

Event of 2019

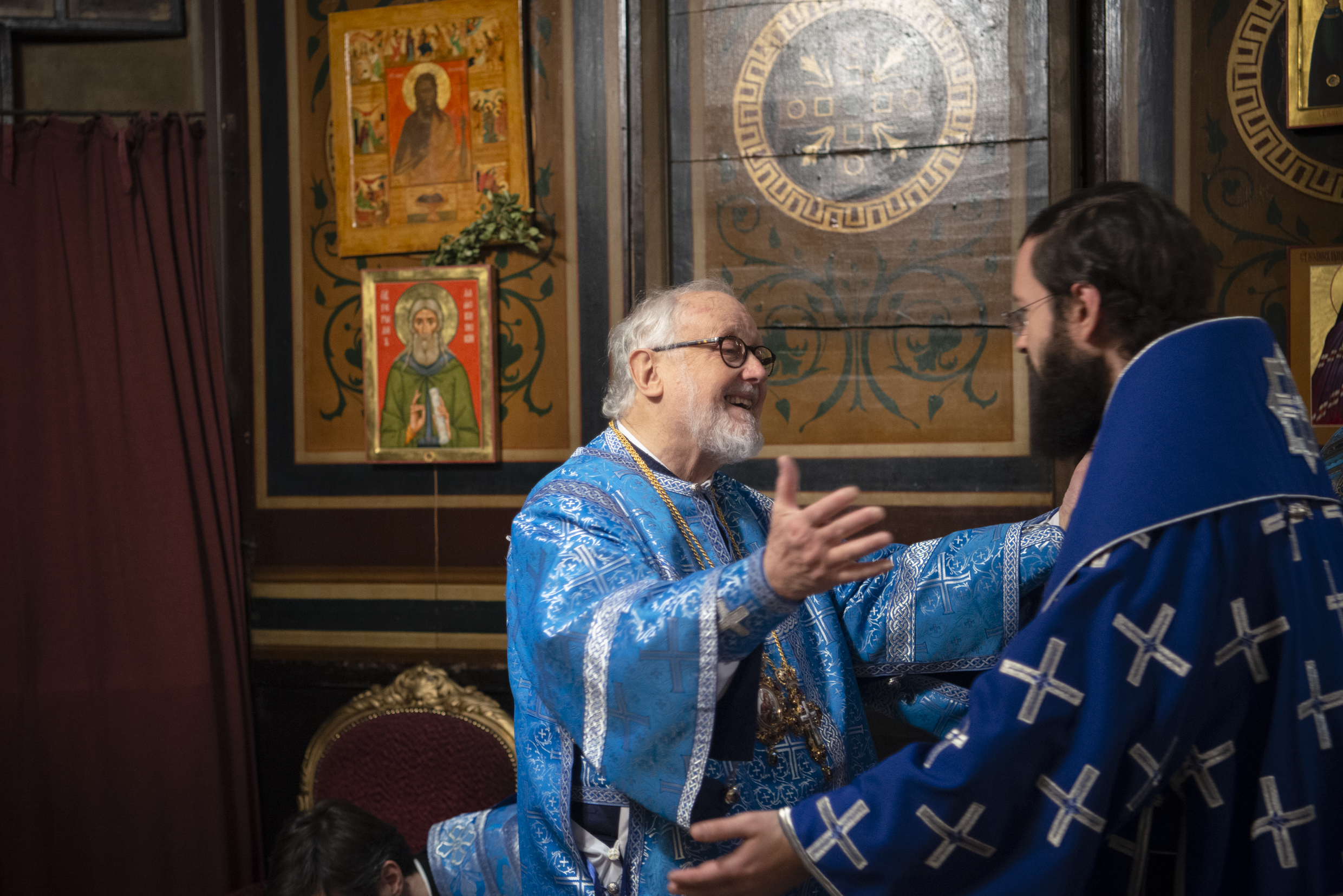
Metropolitan John (Renneteau) greets ROC Patriarchal Exarch in Western Europe Metropolitan Anthony (Sevryuk), December 6, 2019

The joining of the Archdiocese of Russian Orthodox Churches in Western Europe to the Moscow Patriarchate was the process of the Archdiocese of Russian Orthodox Churches in Western Europe (AROCWE), formerly part of the Patriarchate of Constantinople, entering the jurisdiction of the Moscow Patriarchate. About half of the jurisdictions joined the Moscow Patriarchate as the "Archeparchy of the Parishes of Russian tradition in Western Europe" (not part of the Patriarchal Exarchate in Western Europe), while the remaining jurisdictions joined various other patriarchates aligned with the Ecumenical Patriarchate of Constantinople, such as the Greek Orthodox Metropolis of France.

The AROCWE, originally having the status of a metropolis, was founded in 1921 as part of the Moscow Patriarchate by a decree of Patriarch Tikhon of Moscow. In 1931, the AROCWE, headed by Metropolitan Eulogius (Georgievsky), passed to the Patriarchate of Constantinople and received the status of "temporarily united special exarchate of the Most Holy Patriarchal Ecumenical See on the territory of Europe". In 1965, it declared itself "an independent and self-sufficient Archdiocese of the Orthodox Church of France and Western Europe". From 1971 to 1999, it was affiliated to the Greek Orthodox Metropolis of France. From 1999 to 2018, it was the Exarchate of the Orthodox Russian churches in Western Europe under the Ecumenical Patriarchate.

Although the issue of returning to the Moscow Patriarchate has been raised many times, the process of preparing for the transition of the AROCWE to the Russian Orthodox Church only began after the Synod of the Patriarchate of Constantinople abolished the AROCWE's status of exarchate on November 27, 2018, with the requirement that its parishes join the metropolises of the Ecumenical Patriarchate. The Archdiocese itself, led by its primate Archbishop John (Renneteau), refused to comply with this requirement and, wishing to continue to preserve its own existence and its own traditions, began to look for ways out of the situation. Various options were proposed for this purpose, but the proposal to join the Moscow Patriarchate received the greatest support. On September 14, 2019, the Holy Synod of the Russian Orthodox Church received Archbishop John (Renneteau) into the clergy of the Moscow Patriarchate, entrusting him with the management of the clergy and parishes that wanted to follow him. On October 7 of the same year, based on the resolution of the Pastoral assembly of the archdiocese, the Holy Synod of ROC adopted the archdiocese itself. The decision, among other things, determined that the archdiocese would operate within the Moscow Patriarchate with special rights, in particular, "its liturgical and pastoral features, which are part of its traditions", as well as "the historically established features of its diocesan and parish administration, including those established by Metropolitan Eulogius (Georgievsky), based on the peculiarities of the existence of the ecclesiastical inheritance headed by him in Western Europe and taking into account certain decisions of the all-Russian Church Council of 1917-1918" are preserved.

The Russian Orthodox Archdiocese of Western European parishes joined the Russian Orthodox Church on November 2–4, 2019. On November 3, during the Liturgy at the Cathedral of Christ the Saviour in Moscow, Patriarch Kirill of Moscow presented a Patriarchal and Synodal letter of joining the Moscow Patriarchate to Archbishop John of Dubna and elevated him to the rank of metropolitan

The decision to join the Moscow Patriarchate was not supported by all the clergy and laity of the archdiocese. Some parishes and clerics of the abolished Exarchate joined the local dioceses of the Patriarchate of Constantinople, as well as other local Eastern Orthodox churches.

As of December 2019, the archdiocese comprised 67 monasteries, parishes, and communities, representing 58% of the 115 units that existed at the time of the Exarchate's abolition, which corresponded to the percentage of votes for reunification with the Moscow Patriarchal (58.1%) cast during the archdiocese's Extraordinary General Assembly held in Paris on September 14, 2019.

== Break of communion between the Moscow Patriarchate and Constantinople ==
Russian Russian Orthodox Church's Holy Synod issued a statement on September 8, 2018, in response to the launch of the procedure for granting autocephaly to the Orthodox Church of Ukraine by the Constantinople Patrairachate, which expressed "strong protest and deep indignation" over the appointment of Archbishop Daniel (Zelinsky) of Pamphilon and Bishop Hilarion (Rudnyk) of Edmonton as exarchs of the Patriarchate of Constantinople in Ukraine. On September 14, at an extraordinary session, the Holy Synod of the Russian Orthodox Church, having passed a judgment on "retaliatory actions in connection with the appointment of its "exarchs" by the Patriarchate of Constantinople to Kiev within the framework of the "decision on granting Autocephalous status to the Orthodox Church in Ukraine" adopted by the Synod of this Church, decided to suspend "the prayer commemoration of Patriarch Bartholomew of Constantinople at the service", "concelebration with the hierarchs of the Patriarchate of Constantinople" and "participation of the Russian Orthodox Church in all Episcopal meetings, theological dialogues, multilateral commissions, and other structures that are chaired or co-chaired by representatives of the Patriarchate of Constantinople". On 15 October 2018, the Holy Synod of the Russian Orthodox Church, meeting in Minsk, decided to cut all ties with the Constantinople Patriarchate. This decision forbade for any member of the ROC (both clergy and laity) joint participation in all sacraments, including communion, baptism, and marriage, at any church worldwide controlled by Constantinople. Since the archdiocese was at that time part of the Patriarchate of Constantinople, this meant a break in communication with it.

The actions of the Patriarchate of Constantinople provoked the protest of some clergy and laity of the archdiocese. According to protodeacon John Drobot-Tikhonitsky: "some parishioners simply left our parishes when Constantinople started 'doing its business' in Ukraine: they did not come to take communion, although they did not have another church nearby. This is just a principal position of people." In October 2018, in protest against the actions of the Patriarch of Constantinople in Ukraine, the Church of the Nativity of Christ and St. Nicholas in Florence withdrew from the jurisdiction of the Patriarchate of Constantinople, moving to the ROCOR. Archpriest George Blatinsky, rector of the church, said: "After the anti-canonical decision made by Patriarch Bartholomew on October 11, we stopped commemorating him. By this decision, Patriarch Bartholomew made the Orthodox Church of Ukraine headed by Metropolitan Onuphrius persecuted." At the General meeting of parishioners, which was attended by more than a hundred people, there was unanimous support for the decision to move to the jurisdiction of the ROCOR.

== Abolition of the Exarchate and reaction to it ==
On November 27, 2018, the Synod of the Church of Constantinople decided unanimously to abolish the Archdiocese of Russian churches in Western Europe and reassign its parishes to local metropolises of the Ecumenical Patriarchate. This decision, according to the communiqué of the Patriarchate of Constantinople, was "aimed at further strengthening the link of parishes of Russian tradition with the Mother Church of the Patriarchate of Constantinople". This decision was unexpected for everyone, as it was made without the consent of the archidiocese and even without warning 75-year-old Archbishop John (Renneteau). ROC officials responded with a reminder of the 2003 proposal of Alexy II to the AROCWE to move to the Moscow Patriarchate. On the same day, the Synod of the Church of Constantinople announced the convening of a unification council in Kyiv.

According to the publicist Serey Bychkov, the initiators of this decision were Metropolitan Emmanuel (Adamakis) of France and Archbishop Job (Getcha) of Telmissos: "Archbishop Job considered himself insulted when Patriarch Bartholomew removed him several years ago and dismissed him from the post of administrator of the Archdiocese. [...] For Metropolitan Emmanuel, the Archdiocese of Paris was a constant annoyance — he was used to a calm and measured way of life, and the existence of 56 Autonomous and mostly very active Orthodox parishes in France did not give him peace. Both hierarchs did not understand and did not accept the Archdiocese's Charter, according to which the Bishop is elected by clerics and laity. And the parochial statutes of the Archdiocese grant parishioners an incredible freedom, to the point that a misbehaving priest can be replaced at their request. These "ecclesiastical innovations" (although the archdiocese lived for almost 100 years according to the decisions of the local Council of the Russian Church in 1917–18) were incomprehensible to the Greeks" According to Gueorguy von Rosenschild, President of the "Movement for a local orthodoxy of Russian Tradition in Western Europe", "The revocation of the Tomos of 1999 is explained by the concern to avoid the claims of Ukrainian diasporas, dependent on Mr. Doumenko, who could demand to have, 'like the Russians', an Exarchate. It was urgent to revoke the existing one".

This decision created a legal conflict: as a legal entity within the framework of French law, the archdiocese existed, but as a spiritual entity within the Patriarchate of Constantinople, it did not.

On November 28, 2018, the Office of the Diocesan Administration of the archdiocese reported that "on November 27, 2018, the Holy Synod of our Patriarchate decided to abolish the status of our Archdiocese as an Exarchate. This decision of the Holy Synod, [...] was in no way requested by the Archdiocese. His Eminence, Archbishop John, was not consulted prior to this decision" and "learned of this decision during a private meeting with the Patriarch before the meeting of the Holy Synod."

On 28 November, the St. Sergius Orthodox Theological Institute, which was under the jurisdiction of the AROCWE, published a communiqué in which it declared it "renews today its faithful attachment to the person and action of His All-Holiness Bartholomew I and reaffirms its attentive following in the spirit of unity called by the Holy and Great Council of Crete." According to Sergei Bychkov, "Archpriest Nikolai Chernokrak, dean of the St. Sergius theological Institute, unconditionally took the side of vladyka John"

On 29 November, after the synod had ended, the same communiqué which had been released one day prior concerning the Ecumenical Patriarchate's decision to dissolve the AROCWE was released, in French, on the official website of the Ecumenical Patriarchate. The Ecumenical Patriarchate "never explicitly justified" its decision to dissolve the AROCWE.

On 30 November, the council of the AROCWE declared in a communiqué that this decision of the Ecumenical Patriarchate was "unforeseen". The communiqué added that since the AROCWE had not requested this decision, two things should be done before the AROCWE would comply to this decision: Archbishop John of Charioupolis, as the head of the AROCWE, will have to "invite the priests of the Archdiocese to a pastoral assembly, on December 15, 2018, to discuss with those who carry with him the spiritual responsibility of the parishes and faithful of the Archdiocese" and the AROCWE council will have to "convene a general assembly of the Archdiocese, in which all the clergy and lay delegates elected by the parishes and communities, which are the adherent associations of the Diocesan Union, will take part." The communiqué concluded that since John of Charioupolis had not requested this decision, he still remained fully in pastoral charge of the Russian Orthodox Churches in Western Europe.

On 10 December, the AROCWE published a communiqué saying the Pastoral Assembly of 15 December was not "a statutory decision-making body regarding the future of the Archdiocese [...] The legitimate collegial bodies to which our statutes [...] entrust the administrative responsibility for any decisions are the General Assembly [...] and, between two assemblies, the Archdiocesan Council."

After its 15 December Pastoral Assembly, the AROCWE released a communiqué in which it states that it decided to call an extraordinary General Assembly, scheduled for 23 February 2019, in Paris. The goal of this General Assembly was to discuss the November 2018 decision of the Ecumenical Patriarchate to dissolve the AROCWE.

Archimandrite Johannes (Johansen) announced on 16 December 2018 that the Norwegian Orthodox Parish of St. Nicholas has left the Archdiocese of Russian Orthodox churches in Western Europe and is now subject to the Serbian Orthodox Eparchy of Britain and Scandinavia.

From the very beginning, Archbishop John decided to completely ignore the decision of the Patriarchate of Constantinople to abolish the Russian Orthodox Archdiocese (Exarchate) in Western Europe. Archbishop John said that he did not recognize this decision, and announced his intention to continue leading the archdiocese, despite the decision of the synod. The document issued on this occasion notes that due to its unexpected nature, the decision of the Istanbul Synod requires "deep reflection", and in order to respond to this decision, Archbishop John needs to consult with the clergy and laity. To this end, Archbishop John invited the clergy of the Exarchate to a pastoral meeting on December 15, 2018, which resulted in the announcement of an Extraordinary General Assembly of the "Diocesan Directing Union of Russian Orthodox Associations in Western Europe" of the AROCWE in Paris on February 23, 2019, with the participation of clerics and lay delegates and the agenda: "Discussion of the Ecumenical Patriarchate's decision to "reorganize the status of the Exarchate"

On December 15, at the Pastoral Assembly, Archbishop John announced three proposals that the archdiocese had received as options for its preservation: the Russian Church Abroad, autonomy within the Moscow Patriarchate, and the Romanian Orthodox Church.

On 17 January 2019, the AROCWE responded to the fact that "[i]n recent days, many priests and deacons of the Archdiocese have received a letter from the Greek Metropolitan of the country where they reside, ordering them to cease commemorating their own Archbishop, to join the clergy of the Greek Metropolia, to consider that our parishes and communities are already part of these Metropolia and finally ordering them to hand over all relevant parish documents and records". In this official communiqué, the AROCWE reaffirmed that the AROCWE still existed and that John of Charioupolis was still its primate.

On 17 (or 18) January 2019, the council of the AROCWE sent an official letter to the Ecumenical Patriarch, informing him that "the structures of our Archdiocese permit no other body except the General Assembly to respond to a question of an existential nature concerning the status of our ecclesiastical body." The letter also reads concerning the existence of the AROCWE inside the Ecumenical Patriarchate: "we would not want this long and fruitful period to end without a human, face-to-face meeting between the representatives mandated by our diocesan structures. Indeed, we would never be able to find the right words to express our gratitude to the Ecumenical Patriarchate for its canonical protection during all these years."

Thereafter, "for the purpose of the preparation of the General Assembly of 23 February 2019", the AROCWE published a translation of the synodal canonical act sent by the Ecumenical Patriarchate, dated from 27 November 2018, which dissolved the AROCWE.

On 7 February 2019, Metropolitan Emmanuel of France wrote a letter to the priests of the AROCWE. In his letter, Emmanuel declared he was ready to give within his Metropolis of France the statute of vicariate to the members of the AROCWE, with the following characteristics:

- "the preservation of the existing association, which will continue to manage the property belonging to it, and to function according to its own statutes, probably with some necessary adaptations;
- the commemoration by His Excellency, Archbishop John, of His Holiness the Ecumenical Patriarch Bartholomew;
- the guarantee, in keeping with the Ecumenical Patriarchate's constant care about it, of the preservation of your Russian liturgical and spiritual tradition, as well as of your work of Orthodox witness in Western societies."

Emmanuel also declared in his letter he had met Archbishop John of Charioupolis, primate of the AROCWE, and had proposed those points to him.

On 8 February, the AROCWE published "a reminder that the Extraordinary General Assembly has been convened in response to the decision of the Ecumenical Patriarchate to change the status of the Archdiocese, that is to say, to withdraw its title of Patriarchal Exarchate. It is certainly the responsibility of the Patriarchate to grant or not the status of Exarchate to our Archdiocese; on the other hand, it is the responsibility of the Archdiocese and, in this case, of its sovereign statutory body, the EGA, to decide on its dissolution."

On 15 February 2019, Metropolitan Emmanuel of France gave an interview to Orthodoxie.com concerning the future of the AROCWE.

=== Extraordinary General Assembly and refusal of the dissolution ===
On 23 February, the AROCWE held its Extraordinary General Assembly (EGA) 191 out of the 206 voters voted against the dissolution, 15 voted in favor of the dissolution. A new assembly could possibly be held in June to choose a jurisdiction. After the vote, Archbishop John of Charioupolis read a letter that Archbishop Anthony (Sevryuk) of Vienna and Budapest, head of the Moscow Patriarchate's Synodal Department for the Administration of Institutions Abroad, had written. In his letter, Anthony wrote that the Russian Orthodox Church was ready to receive the AROCWE under its jurisdiction. Following the assembly, the AROCWE published a communiqué that said: "For the moment, the life of the Archdiocese continues as on the eve of the EGA. In celebrations, the Archbishop commemorates the Ecumenical Patriarch and the parish clergy commemorate the Archbishop according to the canonical rule."

On May 11 of the same year, the General diocesan meeting of the clergy was held, but the clerics were unable to agree among themselves. As noted in Nezavisimaya Gazeta, the meeting "once again proved that the clergy does not yet have a common opinion on the future of the parishes of the Russian tradition".

On July 5 of the same year, Archbishop John (Renneteau) sent a letter of notification to the parishes of the Russian tradition that were subordinate to him: "Today we are talking about nothing more or less than the survival of our Archdiocese. You can't delay, and you know it. True to my commitment to bring you together again, I am calling a new extraordinary General meeting on September 7, 2019, based on article 34 of the Archdiocese's Charter. Thus, we will vote for our future and, if this leads to a change in canonical affiliation, we will immediately set a time for the corresponding change in the Charter to be adopted in the coming months at a new emergency meeting".

On August 30, the Diocesan Council proposed three issues for discussion by delegates: joining the Moscow Patriarchate; continuing negotiations with the Constantinople; and implementing the project of Archpriest George Ashkov of reforming the internal structures of the AROCWE.

== Options and negotiations ==
=== Moscow Patriarchate ===
In early December 2018, Archbishop John began negotiating with Metropolitan Hilarion (Alfeyev), Chairman of the DECR, met several times with Archbishop Anthony (Sevryuk). Initially, these negotiations took place in secret. According to Archbishop John: "Since December of last year, I have started contacts with the Russian Orthodox Church. My friends helped me meet with Metropolitan Hilarion, and then we started exchanging letters with Patriarch Kirill. Our dialogue developed and a joint Commission was created. Our will was unequivocal: the Archdiocese must live." On December 12, 2018, Patriarch Kirill of Moscow and all Russia, in a letter to Archbishop John of Chariupolis, stressed: "in the event of reunification with the Russian Church, I am ready to guarantee the preservation of the integrity of the Archdiocese as a group of parishes headed by your Eminence as a diocesan Bishop." No other Church made similar promises.

A special Commission was set up for negotiations with the Moscow Patriarchate, which included Archbishop John (Renneteau), vice‑president of the council of the archdiocese Archpriest Jean Gueit, and archdiocese council member Archpriest Théodore Van der Voort. The Moscow Patriarchate was represented by the patriarchal exarch of Western Europe, Metropolitan Anthony (Sevryuk) of Korsun and Western Europe, the deputy managing director of the Moscow Patriarchy, Bishop Sabbas (Tutunov) of Zelenograd, and Archpriest Nikolai Balashov, deputy chairman of the DECR. The first meeting between the commissions took place on January 28 in Paris. Bishop Sabbas (Tutunov) defined the principles that guided the negotiating Committee of the Moscow Patriarchate: "in relation to the Archdiocese of Constantinople, it was a double game. On the one hand, it [Constantinople] seemed to recognize its [AROCWE] specificities, and on the other — and this has been well shown by the practice of recent years — Constantinople believed that the Statute of the Archdiocese was conditional, and the Fanar could determine the order of election of the Archbishop himself. The Russian Orthodox Church is ready to preserve the administrative tradition of the Archdiocese along with its other features. In particular, we have set out as clearly as possible the procedure for the election of bishops, which would reflect the practice of determining candidates and the election itself within the Archdiocese, and at the same time give the Moscow Patriarchate's clergy a droit de regard - the right to look at the list of candidates. This is in line with the practice proposed by the Council of 1917-1918, and it is this Council that is often referred to in the Archdiocese."

On 13–14 February 2019, a delegation of the AROCWE met with bishops of the ROCOR, namely the primate of the ROCOR Metropolitan Hilarion.

On February 23, 2019, during a vote at the Extraordinary General Assembly of the archdiocese, Archbishop John announced to delegates that he was already negotiating with the Moscow Patriarchate, and that "the Archdiocese must return to its origins". According to deacon Alexander Zanemonets, it turned out that "negotiations with the ROC are conducted at a fairly high level, with documented correspondence and protocols of negotiations. [...] Meetings and correspondence with official [...] representatives of Patriarch Kirill should ensure that the Autonomous status of the Archdiocese, the independent election of bishops, and the independence of parishes are guaranteed". Archbishop John particularly noted that after the archdiocese decided not to obey the decree of Patriarch Bartholomew on the liquidation of the Exarchate (191 votes to 15), Constantinople could perform any action up to the complete destruction of the archdiocese as a legal unit. In this regard, Archbishop John called for a full transition to the ROC as soon as possible; and said that if he was banned by Constantinople, he would immediately join the Moscow Patriarchate. His words as well as the letter from Patriarch Kirill caused heated debates.

After that, negotiations with the Moscow Patriarchate continued: on April 5, the commissions met in Moscow. On April 22, 2019, Archbishop John sent another letter to the clergy and laity of the archdiocese, in which he stressed that "at present only the Russian Orthodox Church can give an answer that would allow us to make a decision that meets the requirements of our Church life." The Archbishop John's letter caused indignation among some of the clergy, and in their response on April 23, some clerics indicated that now "there is no reason to believe that the transition to the omophorion of the Moscow Patriarch is the only way for the Archdiocese to survive". At the same time, Archbishop John's opponents did not give any other options. As deacon Alexander Zanemonets explained: "many, of course, do not want to join the Moscow Patriarchate. Even with autonomy. But there is no other specific option yet. Constantinople and the ROCOR are ready to simply include us in their ready-made dioceses." Thus, at the archdiocese's pastoral meeting in Paris on May 11, Archpriest Wladimir Yagello stated that "the authoritarian structure of the Russian Orthodox Church and its complete fusion with the Russian state are absolutely unacceptable." The RIA Novosti news agency noted that the question of joining the Moscow Patriarchate has acquired a political color, citing the words of a parishioner of the former Exarchate: "Some even say that it is not a question of choosing between local churches, but for Putin or against Putin." According to The Tablet decision to join to the Moscow Patriarchate "not be popular among critics who fear that joining the Moscow Patriarchate will eventually hollow out the archdiocese's autonomous character and integrate it into the Russian Church's pro-Kremlin policies".

On June 21, 2019, the third meeting of the negotiating commissions was held in Vienna. In June 2019, the fact that John (Renneteau) met with representatives of the Moscow Patriarchate in Vienna to negotiate the terms of the archdiocese's entry into the jurisdiction of the Moscow Patriarchate was confirmed to Nezavisimaya Gazeta by both sides of the negotiation process. At the same time, the composition of the negotiation commissions became known.

In early August, the conditions under which the Moscow Patriarchate coild accept the archdiocese became known. As Bishop Sabbas (Tutunov) noted, "when we had a dialogue with representatives of the Archdiocese, both they and we said that any political or other preferences have no meaning in our Church dialogue — we were talking about the unity of the Church, not about the attitude to politics."

On September 3, 2019, after the decision of the Holy Synod of the Patriarchate of Constantinople to dismiss Archbishop John, the list of pending decisions submitted to the Assembly was changed. Thus, at the General meeting on September 7, a direct decision would be made on the "project of joining the Moscow Patriarchate", which was developed by the joint Commission "Archdiocese — Moscow Patriarchate" during six months.

As protodeacon John Drobot-Tikhonitsky noted, the main reason that most of the clergy and laity of the archdiocese were inclined in favor of the Moscow Patriarchate was the respect of the Russian Church for the traditions of the archdiocese. "The main argument is that we were accepted as we are, with our status, respecting our history, without changes, peacefully and with open arms, which is very comforting and encouraging".

=== Patriarchate of Constantinople ===
From the very beginning, the Patriarchate of Constantinople demanded the implementation of its decisions. In January 2019, a communique appeared on the archdiocese's website stating that many priests and deacons had received a letter from the Greek metropolitans "ordering them to stop commemorating Archbishop John, join the clergy of the Greek Metropolis, as if the parishes and communities of the Archdiocese were already part of the Metropolis, and provide him with all the required documents". The archdiocese considered this "interference in the internal life" of the Church organization, "illegal both from the point of view of canonical and civil law".

In the words of the Archbishop John: "I received a letter from Constantinople, in which I was forbidden to hold general meetings. I asked for a meeting with Patriarch Bartholomew and outlined the whole situation, saying that most parishes want to return to communion with the Moscow Patriarchate. But I was told that I had to do what I was prescribed to on January 12th – all the parishes had to join the Greek Metropolis."

On February 7, 2019, Metropolitan Emmanuel (Adamakis) of France sent an open appeal to the parishes of the archdiocese, in which he promised that if they joined the Greek Metropolis of France, they would do everything that's possible to preserve the archdiocese as an administrative, territorial unit. In particular, he promised "in the status of Vicariate, the preservation of the existing Association, which will continue to manage its property and operate in accordance with its own statutes, perhaps with some necessary changes."

In February 2019, a negotiating group was formed at the General Assembly to establish contacts with different jurisdictions. On March 27, a delegation of the archdiocese consisting of Archpriest Alexander Fostiropoulos (London), Archdeacon Vsevolod Borzakovsky (Rome) and Professor Cyrille Sollogoub (Paris) met with Patriarch Bartholomew at his residence on Phanar, but the participants were unable to agree on the future of the parishes of the Russian tradition. As noted by deacon Alexander Zanemonets, "the Patriarch received the delegation favorably, but advised to implement the decisions of the Synod of the Church of Constantinople on November 27, 2018."

On 29 March 2019, the AROCWE published a communiqué that said that a delegation of the AROCWE had met with the Ecumenical Patriarch Bartholomew. The delegation "handed over to H.H. the Ecumenical Patriarch the letter written by the Council of the Archdiocese, following the Extraordinary General Assembly of 23 February 2019, which refused to accept the dissolution of the Archdiocese by nearly 93% of the votes." The commiqué also stated that a "constructive exchange" has begun and that "it is planned to continue this consultation to consider the future of the Archdiocese."

Those supporting remaining under Constantinople began to criticize Archbishop John for refusing to meet with Patriarch Bartholomew. They stated that the latter had repeatedly invited Archbishop John to discuss the situation together, who for various reasons resisted this, insisting on holding an Extraordinary General Assembly of the archdiocese on September 7, 2019, convened by him without consulting the members of the archdiocese. Finally, on August 17, for the first time since the decree on the liquidation of the exarchate, such a meeting took place. The negotiations brought nothing new. Patriarch Bartholomew confirmed the desire for the parishes of the archdiocese to join the local Greek dioceses, and asked for the September 7 meeting to be canceled, while Archbishop John defended the special status.

The Synod of the Patriarchate of Constantinople on 29–30 August 2019 decided to discharge Archbishop John "from the Apostolic and Patriarchal Ecumenical Throne, personally and only to him, thereby relieving him of the responsibility of the Patriarchal Exarchate for Orthodox parishes of the Russian Tradition in Western Europe". Metropolitan Emmanuel (Adamakis) of France became "responsible for parishes of the former Exarchate" as well as "the rest of the former Exarchate parishes in other Western European countries [...] fall under the responsibility of the respective Hierarchs of the Ecumenical Patriarchate in these areas". Archpriest Alexis Struve was appointed as new rector of the St. Alexander Nevsky Cathedral in Paris The decision of the synod was notified by a letter from Patriarch Bartholomew dated August 30. Metropolitan Emmanuel (Adamakis) was appointed to manage the parishes of the former Exarchate. The communiqué of the diocesan administration, published on the official website of the archdiocese on September 3, 2019, stated: "Monsignor John informed that he had not requested such leave to date and sent the Patriarchate a request for an explanation. Meanwhile, Archbishop John confirms that the Extraordinary General Assembly will be held regularly on September 7 as scheduled."

On 2 September, Metropolitan Emmanuel of France was named by the Ecumenical Patriarchate locum tenens of the legal association "Union directrice des associations orthodoxes russes" which depends on the AROCWE; the next day Emmanuel sent a circular letter to ask members of the AROCWE in France to commemorate him, and wrote that the 7 September Extraordinary General Assembly would have "no decisionary power". Archbishop John responded to Met. Emmanuel's letter and said Emmanuel's letter was "falsely alarming about the reality of the legal situation of our Archidiocese and the scope of our General Assembly on Saturday."

In a circular letter dated September 4, 2019, Metropolitan Emmanuel (Adamakis), considering himself as temporary administrator of the parishes of the former Archdiocese for the transitional period, informed that the meeting scheduled for September 7, if it took place, could not have any authority to make decisions, and repeated his earlier proposal to establish a vicariate that would preserve the provisions of the charter and the liturgical tradition of the former archdiocese.

On September 27, Metropolitan Emmanuel (Adamakis) announced the convocation of the Council of the archdiocese on September 30. In addition, Metropolitan Emmanuel sent out a circular inviting clergy and laypeople who "confirmed their commitment to the Ecumenical Patriarchate and/or refused to join the Moscow Patriarchate" to a meeting on October 5 at St. Stephen's Cathedral in Paris to consider the establishment of a Vicariate of Russian tradition.

According to Metropolitan John (Renneteau), announced on November 4, 2019, only 10 parishes of the AROCWE remained within the Patriarchate of Constantinople. Opponents of Metropolitan John called this statement unfounded and said that about 60% of the parishes of the archdiocese still remain under the omophorion of Constantinople. November 30, 2019, credo.press website, with reference to "La Lettre du vicariat-No 1, novembre 2019", published a list of 17 parishes and communities (2 of which were assigned to the Church in Biarritz), the Pokrovsky monastery and the Kazan skete in France, remaining under the jurisdiction of the Patriarchate of Constantinople.

=== Other local Churches ===
In addition to options to submit to the decision of the Patriarchate of Constantinople or join the Moscow Patriarchate, other options were considered: transition to the ROCOR, transition to the Romanian Orthodox Church, and transition to the Orthodox Church in America.

As deacon Alexander Zanemonets wrote in December 2018, "the Romanian Church is one of the most active Orthodox churches today. With the largest number of monks and a truly pastoral attitude of the hierarchy and clergy to their people. There are hundreds of Romanian parishes in Western Europe, most of which use local languages for worship, not just Romanian. Many Romanian bishops and priests studied at the Paris Theological Institute since the French language is not very difficult for Romanians. But this is still too strange an option. Perhaps it is acceptable for French or English-speaking communities (what difference to them that the ecclesiastical authorities be Russian, Greek, or Romanian?), but not for the Russian congregation, which for all these decades has considered itself a part of Russian Orthodoxy."

But by August 2019, all these options had disappeared one by one. The Romanian Orthodox Church offered only a temporary omophorion, and only with the permission of Patriarch Bartholomew. The ROCOR stated that they could not "preserve the historical form of the Archdiocese", and therefore suggested that the European parishes join the ROCOR dioceses in Western Europe with a mandatory change in the "calendar and liturgical language", which was significant, since a significant part of the archdiocese's parishes served on the New Julian calendar. The OCA refused, citing "its own circumstances". According to the Secretary of the Council of the archdiocese, Nikolai Lopukhin, all other local Orthodox churches except the Russian, with whom conversations were conducted, did not want to quarrel with Constantinople.

On 9 August, Archbishop John wrote that the AROCWE had petitioned the ROCOR, the OCA, the RomOC, and the Moscow Patriarchate to be received into their jurisdictions, and that a delegation of the AROCWE also met with the Ecumenical Patriarchate. Only the Moscow Patriarchate was able to propose a satisfying status to the AROCWE, i.e. if the AROCWE was to join the ROC, the former would maintain its structures and autonomy. (Note: See also this article (in Russian) with comments of Archbishop John and deacon Alexander of the AROCWE.)

However, a number of parishes passed to the Metropolitan diocese of Western and Southern Europe of the Romanian Orthodox Church. Several other parishes came under the jurisdiction of the Serbian and Bulgarian Orthodox churches. These local churches maintained Eucharistic communion with both Constantinople and Moscow, which is important for many parishioners. The choice of the Romanian Patriarchate by some parishes was partly due to the fact that some parishioners were of Moldovan origin.

=== Independence ===
Archpriest Wladimir Yagello, rector of the parish of Notre-Dame-du-Seine in Paris, suggested that the archdiocese should seek full independence from any patriarchates and local Orthodox churches, referring to the experience of independent existence of the archdiocese in 1965–1971. He officially announced this idea on May 11, 2019, at a pastoral meeting. As he explained in an interview with an Independent newspaper: "Then we declared our independence from everyone. A special Declaration was drawn up, signed by priests Nikolai Afanasiev and Alexey Knyazev, as well as Konstantin Andronikov and other leading professors of our theological Institute of St. Sergius in Paris. There were no disputes about our independence at that time, but we were looking for some other way. And in 1971, we again received recognition from Constantinople. First temporary, and in 1999 permanent. But while it was not there, we were independent and everyone recognized us, we were in communication with all the churches, no one ignored us and called us heretics. So now we just offer exactly the same solution to the issue as in 1965." In the words of archdeacon Vsevolod Borzakovsky, another cleric of the archdiocese: "some members of the Archdiocese believe that its future generations will no longer be associated with either Greece or Russia. They live and will live in the West, so now is the time to think about creating their own European Orthodox Church."

In August 2019, Archdiocese cleric Archpriest George Ashkov published an open letter offering his program for overcoming the crisis that had befallen the archdiocese. He called for not accepting anyone's omophorion, and for creating an independent Church structure with a project to create an independent local Church, which he recommended to call "the Orthodox Church of the Russian tradition in Western Europe according to the statutes of the Moscow Council of 1917-18". He advocated the election of bishops from among the clergy of the archdiocese and changing its charter so that it became the charter of the local Church. The archdiocese's cleric, deacon Alexander Zanemonets, commented on the project: "This option could be interesting not in the context of the current issues facing the Archdiocese, but in the context of the internal structure of the diocese. Something we've been missing for a long time. But all this can be considered only after we get into a canonical jurisdiction." According to Jivko Panev, the structure proposed by George Ashkov will look more like a sect. "Our dilemma is not to choose between Constantinople and Moscow, our current choice is either to be in the Church or to be outside It. In my opinion, father George's proposal is utopian. It is illiterate from the point of view of both canons and ecclesiology. We cannot compare our situation with what happened in the Orthodox Church in America on the eve of the recognition of its autocephaly. There were nine bishops and 360 parishes. We don't have that. Moreover, there was support for the Moscow Patriarchate. No one will support us. Patriarch Bartholomew has already stated that he will declare such a Church structure non-canonical."

In early September, after the decision of the Patriarchate of Constantinople to release Archbishop John from the management of the parishes of the former exarachate, Archpriest George Ashkov unexpectedly asked to withdraw his project "because it remains impossible to consider it in the new situation". At the same time, he expressed the wish that his project will be considered later.

== Joining the Moscow Patriarchate; splitting of the council of the archdiocese ==
At the 7 September Extraordinary General Assembly, 104 voters out of the 186 voted in favor of the AROCWE being subordinated to the Moscow Patriarchate (58.1%). The Statutes of the Archdiocese required a two-thirds majority, and consequently the motion failed to pass.

186 delegates out of 246 eligible to vote gathered in Paris on September 7, 2019. The decision to transfer to the Moscow Patriarchate received a majority of votes: 104 people (58,1%) voted for it and 75 against it. Six ballots were spoiled, and one was left blank. As a result, although the majority of those gathered supported joining the Moscow Patriarchate, the number of votes cast was lower than 2/3 (117 votes) required by French law to make changes to Statutes. After announcing the results of the vote, Bishop John said that in any case, since more than 50% of the votes cast were in favor, he would ask for him and the archdiocese to join the Moscow Patriarchate this evening, and that parishes that wanted to do so should only follow him. A discussion on legal issues began, with speeches often going in opposite directions. In such circumstances, Archbishop John said that in order for the clergy to serve the Liturgy on Sunday, he decided to postpone any decision for a while and that he would remember Patriarch Bartholomew at the Liturgy on Sunday, but from Monday he would consult with his assistants and decide what to do next.

On 9 September, the ROC said it would continue consultations with the AROCWE, and would accept communities from the AROCWE which wished to join the ROC. On 10 September, the AROCWE released a communiqué in which it said that "The administration council will soon examine the follow-up to be given to the situation thus created."

On September 11, 2019, Metropolitan Hilarion (Alfeyev) noted: "the Decision of the Patriarchate of Constantinople, announced by its representatives, in fact, left the Archdiocese no choice. And here the question is very simple: to be or not to be. And so I think that this question or the Archdiocese as a whole, or each of its parishes individually will have to answer in the near future". He added that "the Russian Orthodox Church made all the necessary in order to facilitate the insertion of the Archdiocese, or those of the parishes who wish to do so, part of the Russian Orthodox Church."

On September 14, 2019, Archbishop John (Renneteau) sent an address to Patriarch Kirill of Moscow and all Russia, in which he said that during the extraordinary meeting of the archdiocese, the majority of voters, clerics and laity, "expressed support for the project of canonical accession to the Moscow Patriarchate, developed at the meetings of the joint Commission", which worked throughout 2019. In the same letter, Archbishop John asked that he be accepted, along with the communities that correspond to the majority of those who voted at the meeting, "into canonical communion and unity with the Moscow Patriarchate to ensure the continuity of the Church, liturgical and mysterious life of the Archdiocese of Western European parishes of the Russian tradition."

The same day members of the Holy Synod of the Moscow Patriarchate decided to accept Archbishop John, as an individual, in the jurisdiction of the Moscow Patriarchate with the title of "of Dubna", and also "those of the clergy under his leadership, and congregations, who express such a will" and "to charge to Archbishop John of Dubna with the management of the aforementioned parishes". In addition, the decision of the synod stated: "after receiving an appeal from the assembly of representatives of the parishes, additional consideration be given to define the canonical form of their organization on the basis of the historically developed special features of the diocesan and parochial administration as well as liturgical and pastoral traditions established by Metropolitan Eulogius, taking into account the conditions of existence of the Church's part which he headed in Western Europe." (Note: See also the Minutes of the 14 September 2019 session of the Holy Synod.) According to Patriarch Kirill: "we held a meeting of the Holy Synod of the Russian Orthodox Church remotely, because there was no time to gather the most Reverend members of the Synod. But I talked to each of them and got not just agreement, but a warm agreement. It was necessary to hear the intonation with which the members of the Synod responded to my message about what happened. When I asked them if they were voting for this decision, I received an enthusiastic response: "We don't just vote, we vote with all our heart."

On the same day, Archbishop John published an appeal in which he justified his decision by saying that the archdiocese's charter regulates such issues as finances, the election of bishops, General meetings, but not issues of pastoral service and canonical patronage: "We cannot give a legal answer to the pastoral question." On the same day, Patriarch Kirill and Archbishop John had a telephone conversation, during which the Primate of the Russian Orthodox Church informed Archbishop John of the decision, expressed his joy at the historic event that had occurred, congratulated Archbishop John and thanked him for his wise leadership of the flock.

Dissatisfied with the actions of Archbishop John, the members of the council of the archdiocese held an urgent meeting without informing either the Archbishop himself or those members of the diocesan council who agreed with his decision, and on the night of September 15, an e-mail was sent to the parishes of the archdiocese on September 14, signed by seven of the twelve members of the council of the archdiocese (one of the authorized governing bodies of the archdiocese, according to its charter), stating that, since the Archbishop John, having passed to the Moscow Patriarchate, now "unable to canonically continue to perform the Eucharist in communion with the Ecumenical Patriarchate of Constantinople", according to the statute, "the Council of the Archbishop stated his complete inability to lead the Archdiocese and therefore sent an official request to his Holiness Ecumenical Patriarch Bartholomew of Constantinople, officially asking him to appoint a Locum Tenens". According to the authors of the letter, "parishes and clerics who want to join one of the seven metropolitans of the Ecumenical Patriarchate, on the territories where the parishes of the Archdiocese are located, can apply to Metropolitan Emmanuel of France" or join the ranks of the Romanian Orthodox Church. The letter stated that the clergy, who considered it necessary to follow Archbishop John, should also write a letter of resignation. At the same time, the text emphasized that the archdiocese as a legal entity remains under the jurisdiction of the Patriarchate of Constantinople.

On September 15, Archbishop John led the Liturgy at the Alexander Nevsky Cathedral in Paris, where he first remembered the Patriarch of Moscow and all Russia.

On September 17, the official website of the archdiocese published a message from Archbishop John, who wrote that the authors of the letter "under the guise of trying to 'protect' and 'continue' our Archdiocese, [...] in fact, through a series of nonsense, liquidates our Archdiocese [...] Our extraordinary General meetings on February 23 and September 7, 2019 made obsolete the mention of the Ecumenical Patriarchate in our statutes. It was our meetings, our Council decisions that changed our Charter, and we will have to make appropriate amendments to it." At that time, according to Nezavisimaya Gazeta, at least 67 parishes were known to have expressed a desire to follow Archbishop John.

On September 28, 2019, the Pastoral Assembly of the AROCWE was held in Paris. The Pastoral Assembly of the archdiocese (51 members of the clergy present + 37 members of the clergy who could not be present) voted with a large majority to support Archbishop John's request to join the jurisdiction of the Moscow Patriarchate.

According to Archpriest Jivko Panev, who participated in the pastoral meeting "51 clergymen who attended the meeting, as well as 37 clergy who for various reasons were unable to attend the meeting, confirmed their full support for Archbishop John and agreed to leave for the canonical jurisdiction of the Moscow Patriarchate."

According to a message on the archdiocese's website, this Assembly "reaffirmed by a large majority the decision of Archbishop Jean to request the canonical attachment to the Moscow Patriarchate". A corresponding appeal was made to Patriarch Kirill of Moscow and all Russia. At the same time, archdeacon Vsevolod Borzakovsky, who had previously signed a letter from seven members of the council of the archdiocese, proclaimed many years to Patriarch Kirill.

On September 30, 2019, seven elected members of the council of the archdiocese who did not accept the position of Archbishop John held a meeting under the chairmanship of Metropolitan Emmanuel (Adamakis), the head of the Greek Orthodox Metropolis of France. The meeting was attended by priests Alexander Fostiropoulos, Christophe D'Aloisio and Sergius Sollogub, laypeople Elisabeth von Schlippe and Alexander Victoroff, Alexis Obolensky and Didier Villanova. The other five elected members of the council, namely the priests Jean Gueit and Théodore Van der Voort, archdeacon Vsevolod Borzakovsky, laypeople Nikolai Lopukhin and Michel Ribault-Menetière, were absent, although they were invited to the meeting. The Assembly "took note of the end of the Office of Archbishop John" and "adopted the appropriate resolutions to guarantee the exercise of the social purpose of the Diocesan Union of Russian Orthodox Associations in Western Europe" On the same day, a statement was issued by the Diocesan administration of the AROCWE stating that "the diocesan administration on this day notified fathers Christophe d'Aloisio, Alexander Fostiropoulos and Sergius Sollogub of the immediate termination of their duties in the Council of the Archdiocese", since they "chose to leave the clergy of the Archdiocese since they commemorate hierarchs of other canonical jurisdictions under the Romanian metropolis or the Greek metropolises of England or France", referring to article 67 of the archdiocese's charter, according to which "any cleric member of the board - priest or deacon - who leaves the ranks of the clergy of the Archdiocese shall automatically be deemed to have resigned."

On 2 October, Archbishop John informed that he had convened a council of the archdiocese for 21 October, "to examine the decision of the Holy Synod of the Moscow Patriarchate that we expect for October 8th, and to begin preparations for the next Ordinary General Assembly of our Archdiocese"; he called upon those parishes who have decided or want to join the Greek metropolis of France, and those who will join to Archdiocese of Thyatira to reconsider their position. He also announced he had signed, with the support of two-thirds of the clergy of the Archidiocese, the official request for canonical attachment to the Moscow Patriarchate "in the terms that had been negotiated by the joint commission and decided this summer"

The Russian Orthodox Church's Holy Synod determined on October 7, 2019, "that the Archdiocese of Western European parishes of the Russian tradition, performing its salvific ministry in the historically established totality of its parishes, monasteries and Church institutions, now remains an integral part of the Moscow Patriarchate", and confirmed "the acceptance of clerics and parishes who have expressed such a desire into the jurisdiction of the Moscow Patriarchate as part of the Archdiocese". On the same day, at the end of the session of the Holy Synod of the Russian Orthodox Church, Patriarch Kirill had a telephone conversation with Archbishop John of Dubna. According to Archbishop John, Patriarch Kirill "informed me that the Synod [of the ROC] granted our request and adopted the Protocol that was attached to our appeal. We have developed this Protocol together with the Moscow Patriarchate." It was decided that representatives of the archdiocese would arrive in Moscow to sign the document on acceptance into the jurisdiction of the Russian Orthodox Church on November 3.

On 5 October, Metropolitan Emannuel Adamakis, who had been appointed by the ecumenical patriarch the locum tenens of the archdiocese, notified that he had held an assembly of the clergy and laypeople of the former exarchate who had expressed their intent to join the Greek Orthodox Metropolis of France.

On October 10, 2019, priest Sergius Sollogub sent a document to the parishes of the archdiocese entitled "communique of the Council of the Archbishop" about the meeting of the council of the archdiocese. On October 11, a communique from the archdiocese's office was published, stating that the council would meet on October 21 under the chairmanship of Archbishop John. Besides:

fathers Alexander Fostiropoulos, Christophe D'Aloisio and Sergius Sollogub are no longer members of the Council. Neither were they at the time of the events.

As far as Metropolitan Emmanuel is concerned, he is not locum tenens of the Archdiocese. The Archdiocese is headed by an archbishop who does not need to be replaced, and the Council of the Archdiocese as such has never validly requested such an appointment. Such a request is expressly provided for in our statutes (art. 52). Monsignor Emmanuel cannot finally and in any case represent the archdiocese which was welcomed on October 8 by the Holy Synod of the Moscow Patriarchate within the Moscow Patriarchate. Monsignor Emmanuel depends on the Patriarchate of Constantinople.

Finally, it will be recalled that the locum tenens is in charge of acting in Current Affairs, and may not make any appointment, transfer or dismissal of priests. This is also reflected in our statutes (art. 53). He cannot therefore take any initiative whatsoever concerning the "preservation of his interests and the regularization of his currently very unstable situation". It will be recalled that on October 5 last, Monsignor Emmanuel gathered, as it is written on the website of the Greek Metropolis of France, "clerics and laity of the former Exarchate of parishes of Russian tradition in Western Europe in France", and "these clerics, following the last events, accepted the decisions of the Holy Synod of the Ecumenical Patriarchate, and, following the Holy Canons, worked on the form of their meeting within the metropolis of France". These clerics, whose authors of the "communiqué", are no longer in our Archdiocese, but in the Greek Metropolis. [...]

The diocesan administration remains in place, under the authority of its Archbishop John, and will continue to ensure that the choice of the archdiocese in its vast majority, is respected. It will defend the Archdiocese and its members, if necessary, against any form of usurpation.

On 11 October, seven members of the council of the archdiocese published a communique in which they expressed their protest against what they said was an act of "gross violation of the Statute" on the part of Archbishop John Renneteau that had occurred in the St Sergius Church in Paris on 8 October where he intruded and celebrated liturgy without the invitation and against the will of the Rector.

=== Official act of reunion ===
In early October, Archbishop John Renneteau told TASS he would travel to Moscow and sign a document on the incorporation of those who would follow him into the ROC on 3 November 2019. However, on 1 November 2019 at the Throne room of the Patriarchal and residence at the Danilov monastery in Moscow Patriarch Kirill single-handedly signed the Patriarchal and Synodal Charter ("Grammota") that claimed to restore the unity of the archdiocese with the ROC. This letter was signed in two copies: one was intended for presentation to the head of the Archdiocese of Western European parishes of the Russian tradition, Archbishop John (Renneteau) of Dubna, and the other was to be kept in the archives of the Moscow Patriarchate. Later, on the same day, the delegation of the AROCWE, composed of 105 people headed by Archbishop John (Renneteau) which included 37 priests and deacons, arrived in Moscow from France to participate in the ceremony of reunion.

2-4 November 2019 in Moscow held celebrations on the occasion of the accession of the Archdiocese of the Western European parishes of the Russian tradition, the Russian Orthodox Church dedicated to the feast of the Our Lady of Kazan and National unity day. On 3 November, during a liturgy in which the delegation of the AROCWE participated, Patriarch Kirill handed the letter of union to Archbishop John. Archbishop John was elevated to the rank of Metropolitan "considering [his] firm standing in canonical truth and [his] in pastoral work leading to the restoration of the Church's unity." Now-Metropolitan John commented that the ROC gave the AROCWE "an opportunity to survive", and that the ROC insured the preservation of the liturgical, theological, pastoral, administrative and financial situation of the AROCWE in the way this situation always was.

As Patriarch Kirill noted: "I invited vladyka John, he arrived in Moscow, and we had a very thorough conversation. During these years of being independent, so to speak, they have developed certain features of Church administration. And they are already used to these features. They are not in any conflict with the canonical tradition. And vladyka John asked me to preserve these traditions. And I gave him my consent, because some of these traditions are related to the decisions of the local Council of 1917-1918. And since these decisions of the Council were practiced by them throughout the post-Council history, I decided not to change the situation in any way and give them the opportunity to preserve this specificity of their management, which does not and cannot violate our unity and does not bear any canonical distortions."

Patriarch Kirill of Moscow and all Russia elevated the primate of the AROCWE, Archbishop John (Renneteau), to the rank of Metropolitan, with preservation of the liturgical mention Metropolitan John as "Archbishop of Western European Parishes". The corresponding decree of the Patriarch was read out: "In consideration of standing in canonical truth and pastoral works that led to the restoration of Church unity with the mother church — the Russian Orthodox Church of the Western European ecclesiastical inheritance, founded in 1921 under the leadership of Metropolitan Eulogius (Georgievsky), you are awarded the title of Metropolitan, while also preserving the traditional liturgical commemoration of "your Eminence Metropolitan John of Dubna, Archbishop of Western European parishes of the Russian tradition". After that Patriarch Kirill exclaimed "Axios" and crowned him with a white klobuk.

According to Patriarch Kirill, the reunion of the ROC and the archdiocese is "not just a Church act", but "the last act that closes the drama of the revolution and civil war, the drama of the division of our people".

On November 4, 2019, at a press conference in Moscow, Metropolitan John said: "to date, we have retained 60 parishes, but there are still parishes that will return to us. As for clerics, priests and deacons, about 90 people remained and confirmed their decision to live in the Archdiocese in communion with the Moscow Patriarchate." Of those who refused to join the ROC, about ten communities decided to remain in the Patriarchate of Constantinople, while others are considering their future — some planned to join the Romanian Patriarchate, and some are planning to join the Russian Orthodox Church abroad. He also noted: "many of us still think that returning to the bosom of the Russian Church is a kind of submission. In fact, there is no subordination — we are talking about communion in faith, communion in theology, communion in the Eucharist. During all the time that we were in Russia, we did not feel that they wanted to rule over us, we felt more like a confraternity." In the afternoon of November 5, Metropolitan John of Dubna left for Paris.

== Further developments ==
As of November 13, 2019, according to the BBC, most churches in the archdiocese held only emergency midterm votes. Final decisions that have legal force and are properly executed are almost never accepted.

On November 17, 2019, the remaining members of the Council of the Archdiocese of Constantinople met in Paris under the chairmanship of Metropolitan Emmanuel (Adamakis) of France, the latter having the rank of Locum Tenens. It was decided to convene an extraordinary General Assembly on January 18, 2020, to elect a new chairman of the Diocesan Council in St. Stephen's Cathedral. It was stated that "the Parishes of the former Exarchate on French soil will be able to join the Vicariate of the metropolis of France under the leadership of Metropolitan Emmanuel". Lawyer of the "Diocesan Assembly" was instructed to take the necessary steps to ensure the preservation of the property of the Diocesan Council, "which the former Archbishop continues to illegally dispose of, despite Synodal decisions and in contradiction with the Charter."

In response, the official website of the archdiocese noted in this regard: "It is legally impossible to condition the right to vote at the EGA of a civil association on allegiance to the decisions of a religious authority, namely the Holy Synod of the Patriarchate of Constantinople. It is equally impossible to understand how 25 parishes out of the 85 that our Archdiocese has, a little before its OGA [Ordinary General Assembly], could claim to decide, against the other 60, the future of the Archdiocese[.] [...] [S]uch a meeting would be convened out of time, since a locum tenens has statutorily only 4 months to organize the AGE, counting from the date of his appointment. No extension is provided for it in the statutes. Monsignor Emmanuel was "appointed" at the session of the Holy Synod of Constantinople on 29 and 30 August 2019 and confirmed by patriarchal decree of 2 September 2019. On 18 January, it would be too late anyway."

On November 29, 2019, an announcement appeared on the website of the Greek metropolis of France of the Patriarchate of Constantinople about the creation of a "Vicariate of the Russian tradition with the metropolis in France" for those parishes which remained faithful to the Ecumenical Patriarchate; this vicariate was to be formally established in January 2020. According to the document, designated as "Letter of the Vicariate No. 1", there are only 18 such parishes in France and at least three other communities "continue to commemorate Ecumenical Patriarch Bartholomew, but have not yet made a final decision on their jurisdictional affiliation". It was stated that at least two communities in Spain, five in Scandinavia, and 16 in Great Britain and Ireland "remained loyal to Constantinople." About 40 parishes remained in the Patriarchate of Constantinople, four joined the Romanian, four joined the Bulgarian churches, one joined the Serbian diocese and one the Church of Antioch.

On January 18, 2020, an Extraordinary General Assembly of the "Diocesan Union" was held under the jurisdiction of the Patriarchate of Constantinople, in which those who refused to transfer the archdiocese to the Russian Orthodox Church took part and joined the Vicariate of the Greek Metropolis of France created for this occasion. This assembly was unable to elect a President because a quorum was not reached; Metropolitan Emmanuel (Adamakis) continued to hold the position of Locum Tenens. The Assembly unanimously (with one abstention) decided that negotiations should be preferred over judicial proceedings, instructing the Board to contact officials of the "Diocese of Dubna" (i.e. the AROCWE) to organize negotiations.

On January 24, 2020, the regular General meeting of the Archdiocese of parishes of the Russian tradition in Western Europe, chaired by Metropolitan John of Dubna, was held at the St. Sergius Institute after the divine Liturgy. At the opening of the Assembly, 113 of the 182 delegates were present, and then their number later increased to 133 (there was a national strike on the same day), which was significantly higher than the quorum of 91 delegates. Thus, the assembly was able to vote for the renewal of the members of the archdiocese council and elect members of various committees. In addition, the Assembly elected two vicar bishops by a new vote: Archimandrite Syméon (Cossec) of the St. Siluan monastery, and hieromonk Elisée (Germain). The next day, the Extraordinary General Assembly approved by a majority vote the necessary changes to the charter to bring them into line with the "Charter" presented to Metropolitan John by Patriarch Kirill of Moscow on November 3, 2019.

On December 4, 2020, an agreement was signed which constitutes the culmination of an approach aimed at finding a peaceful outcome to the conflictual situation, and which was unanimously supported by Metropolitan John and the Council of the Archdiocese, and by Metropolitan Emmanuel and the parishes which, meeting in general assembly under his presidency, expressed themselves in this direction. The parties agreed on "mutual recognition and scrupulous respect for the decisions of the parishes and communities that are members of the diocesan Union to stay or not in the Union (which came under the authority of the Moscow Patriarchate) while preserving the means, in particular material, which should enable the communities to peacefully pursue their spiritual journey, whatever the decision they have taken". This decision was welcomed by Archpriest Nikolai Balashov, an employee of the DECR: "The Russian Orthodox Church readily accepted those communities within the archdiocese in Western Europe that wished it, and did not make claims to anyone. If now those who wished to remain in the jurisdiction of the Metropolis of France of the Patriarchate of Constantinople agreed with this voluntary choice and promised to respect it, of course, this can only be welcomed. God grant that the peace will be lasting"
