= Archdiocese of Russian Orthodox Churches in Western Europe =

Diocese with a special status within the Russian Orthodox Church

Coordinates: 48°52′40″N 2°18′06″E

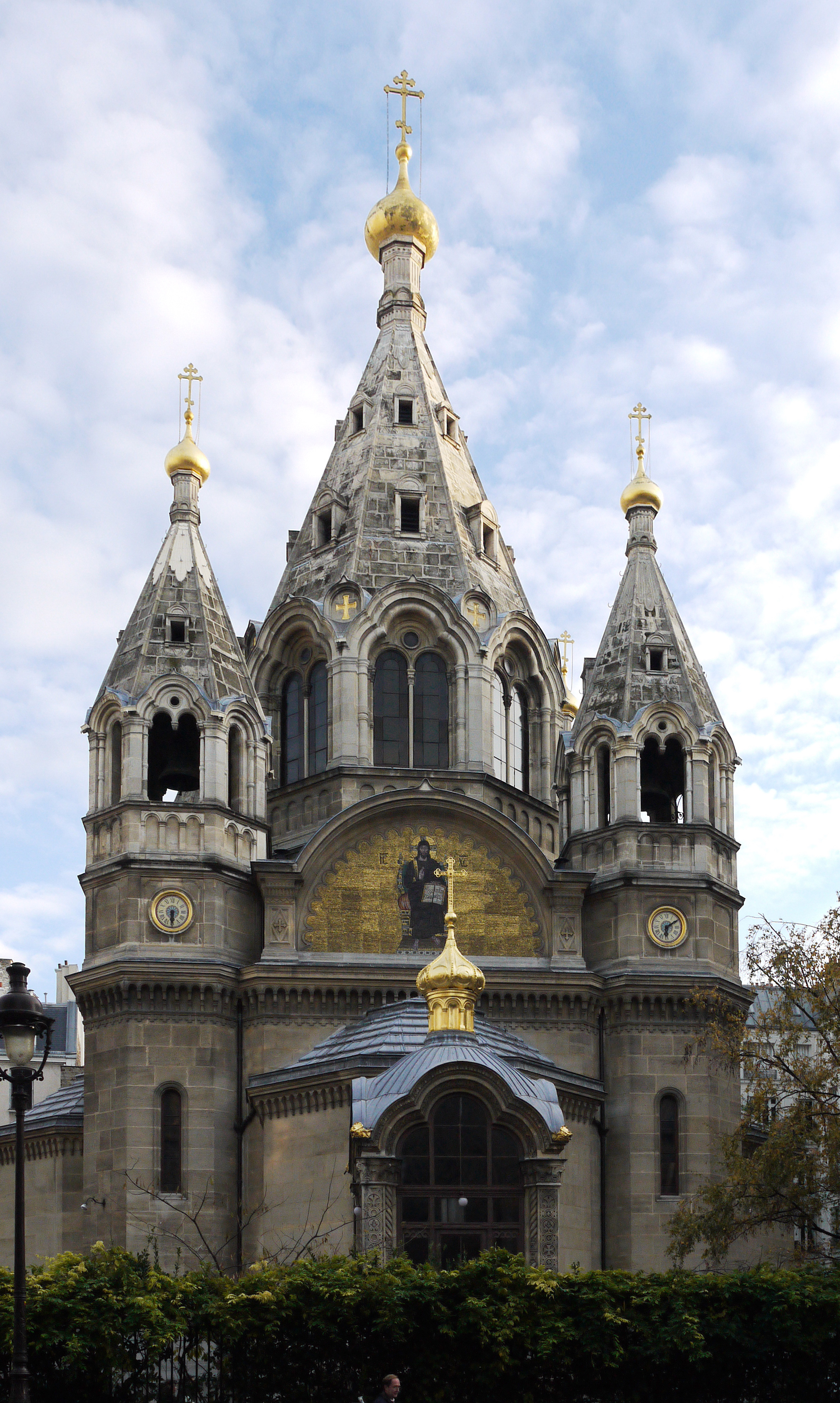
- Alexander Nevsky Cathedral, Paris, seat of the archdiocese

Location
- Country: France, Great Britain, Ireland, Germany, Italy, Belgium, Netherlands, Norway
- Headquarters: Paris

Statistics
- Parishes: 69 (2021)

Information
- Denomination: Eastern Orthodox Church
- Rite: Byzantine
- Established: 1921
- Dissolved: c. 2018–2020
- Cathedral: Alexander Nevsky Cathedral, Paris

Leadership
- Bishop: John (Renneteau)

Website
- archeveche.eu

The Archdiocese of Russian Orthodox Churches in Western Europe (Note: Russian: Архиепископия православных русских церквей в Западной Европе, romanized: Arhiěpiskopija pravoslavnyh russkih cerkvej v Zapadnoj Ěvropye) is an autonomous archdiocese of the Russian Orthodox Church (but before 2018 an Archdiocese of the Ecumenical Patriarchate of Constantinople), headquartered in Paris. It comprises various Russian Orthodox parishes located throughout Western Europe. In a complex sequence of events in c. 2018–2020, the Archdiocese split in two because of the 2018 Moscow–Constantinople schism. More than half (67 of 115) of the jurisdictions joined the Moscow Patriarchate as "Archeparchy of the Parishes of Russian tradition in Western Europe" (not part of the new Patriarchal Exarchate in Western Europe), while the remaining jurisdictions joined various other patriarchates aligned with the Ecumenical Patriarchate of Constantinople, such as the Greek Orthodox Metropolis of France, or other jurisdictions (the Russian Orthodox Church outside Russia, the Romanian Orthodox Church or the Bulgarian Orthodox Church).

The diocese was initially composed of parishes that were under the administration of the Russian émigré bishop Eulogius Georgiyevsky and was known as the Patriarchal Exarchate for Orthodox Parishes of Russian Tradition in Western Europe. Georgiyevsky had decided to place the exarchate under the jurisdiction of the Ecumenical Patriarchate instead of allowing its continued subordination to the Moscow Patriarchate, which was by then under the full control of the Soviet state. He was also unwilling to recognize the authority of the Russian Orthodox Church Outside Russia, then based in Yugoslavia and headed by Metropolitan Anthony Khrapovitsky.

In 1931, Metropolitan Eulogius and his supporters in the clergy and laity were admitted to the Ecumenical Patriarchate of Constantinople. These parishes received a temporary exarchate status within Western Europe, which was later abolished in 1965. Afterwards, this Association existed as the "Orthodox Archdiocese of France and Western Europe and Russian Western European churches of diaspora". In 1971, the archdiocese was again accepted into the Ecumenical Patriarchate. A new reorganization was implemented on 19 June 1999, when Patriarch Bartholomew of Constantinople recreated the exarchate by granting it a tomos. This tomos was later abolished by the Holy Synod of the Patriarchate of Constantinople on 27 November 2018, and the former parishes of the exarchate were instructed to join the relevant dioceses under the Patriarchate of Constantinople. While Article 11 of the archdiocese's statute expressly states that its primate must be a bishop under the Ecumenical Patriarchate, it continues to exist as a legal entity nevertheless.

The archdiocese voted to continue as a legal entity in February 2019, but failed to pass a resolution to join the jurisdiction of the Patriarchate of Moscow in September of that year as was proposed by its primate Archbishop John (Renneteau), who had personally joined the Moscow Patriarchate. On 7 October 2019, the Holy Synod of the Patriarchate of Moscow confirmed the acceptance of clerics and parishes "who expressed such a desire". Many parishes and clerics of the former Exarchate followed Archbishop John, while others joined various jurisdictions, such as the Greek Orthodox Metropolis of France under the Ecumenical Patriarchate, the Romanian Orthodox Church, the Bulgarian Orthodox Church, or the Serbian Orthodox Church.

== History ==
During the 19th century, several parishes were created for the Russian diaspora in various countries of Western Europe, under the jurisdiction of the Russian Orthodox Church. In 1861, Alexander Nevsky Church was built in Paris, and soon became the main regional center of Russian Orthodoxy. Within the Russian Orthodox Church, jurisdiction over parishes in Western Europe was granted to the Metropolitan of Saint Petersburg.

After the onset of the Bolshevik Revolution in 1917, Russian Orthodox Christians based outside Russia, and those who fled there from the communist regime, found themselves in a very difficult situation. In 1920, Metropolitan Eulogius (Georgiyevsky) was sent to Western Europe in order to organize provisional administration. His jurisdiction was confirmed on 8 April 1921, by Patriarch Tikhon of Moscow and Metropolitan Benjamin of Petersburg, who issued a decree creating the Provisional Administration of Russian Parishes in Western Europe, centered in Paris, and appointing Metropolitan Eulogius as its first hierarch.

Faced with new political realities in Russia, and severe restrictions imposed by the Soviet regime upon the Moscow Patriarchate, Metropolitan Eulogius and other exiled Russian hierarchs found a temporary solution in the formation of the Russian Orthodox Church Outside Russia (ROCOR). During the early 1920s, the vast majority of Russian Orthodox Christians in diaspora supported ROCOR, united in their opposition to the Soviet government.

At first, Metropolitan Eulogius was member of the ROCOR Synod, but in 1927 he came into conflict with the majority of ROCOR hierarchs and was subsequently suspended by them. In order to remove Metropolitan Eulogius from his office, ROCOR hierarchs decided to replace him with Metropolitan Seraphim (Lukyanov), but great majority of parishes in Western Europe remained loyal to Metropolitan Eulogius. Thus a split was created within the Russian community in Western Europe, between those who continued to follow Metropolitan Eulogius and those who recognized Metropolitan Seraphim as their new hierarch. Faced with those challenges, Metropolitan Eulogius appealed the Moscow Patriarchate, and received confirmation of his jurisdiction in Western Europe.

In 1930, Metropolitan Sergius (Stragorodsky), acting as locum tenens of the Russian Patriarchal Throne, initiated proceedings against Metropolitan Eulogius because of his public support for Christians suffering under the Soviet regime. On 10 June 1930, a decree was issued, intended to remove Metropolitan Eulogius from his office, and replace him with Metropolitan Vladimir (Tikhonicky). the decree failed, on both accounts, since both hierarchs decided not to obey it. Moscow responded by sending another hierarch, Metropolitan Eleutherius (Bogoyavlensky), who arrived in Paris at the beginning of 1931. Faced with the new jurisdictional crisis, the majority of parishes decided to remain loyal to Metropolitan Eulogius, while a minority recognized Metropolitan Eleutherius. Along with ROCOR under Metropolitan Seraphim, the Russian diaspora in Western Europe found itself divided into three fractions: Moscow under Eleutherius, ROCOR under Seraphim, and the independent parishes led by Eulogius.

=== Under the Church of Constantinople ===
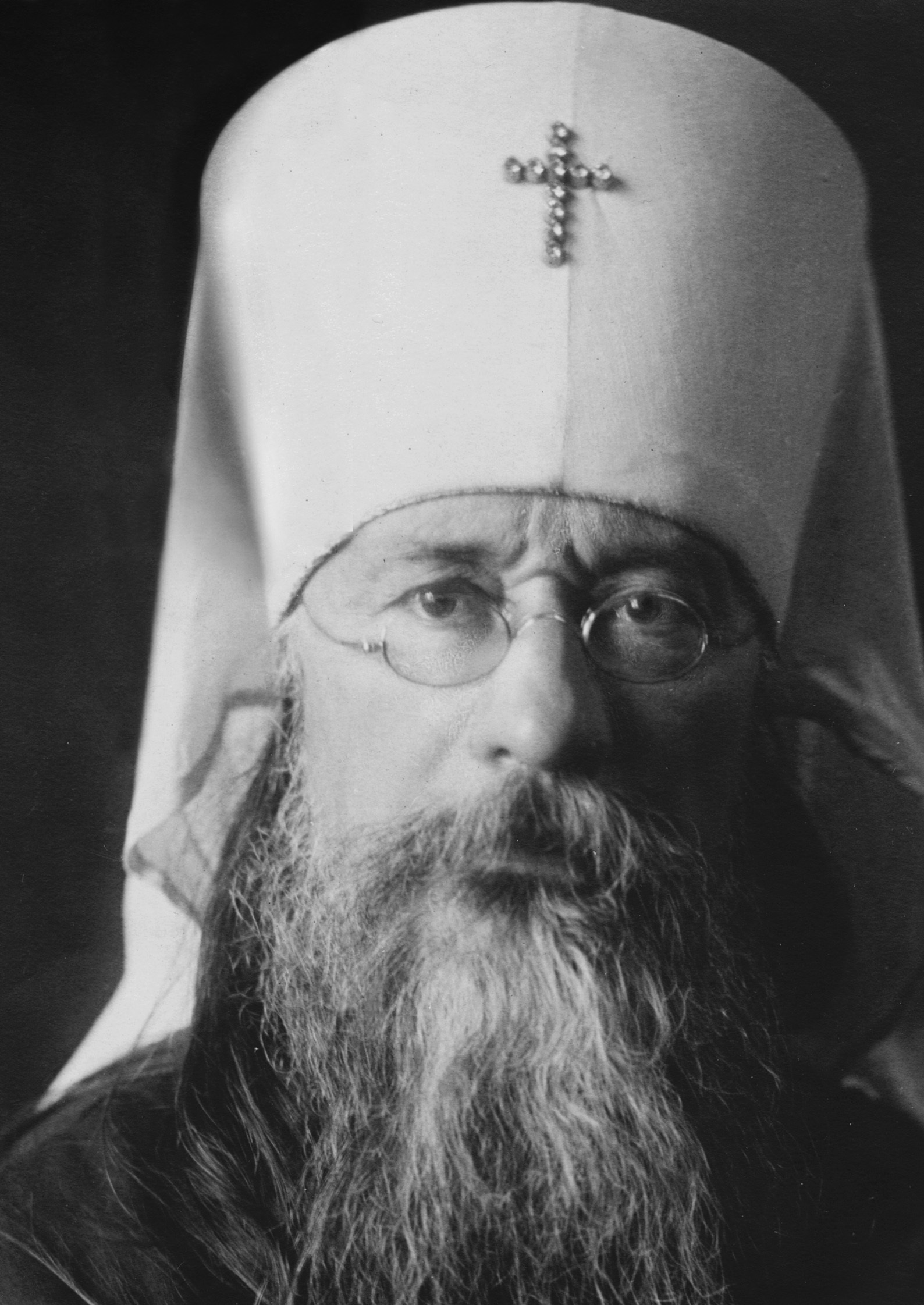
Russian Orthodox Metropolitan Eulogius (Georgiyevsky)

In order to regulate his canonical position, Metropolitan Eulogius petitioned Patriarch Photios II of Constantinople, asking to be received under his canonical care. On 17 February 1931, he was appointed an exarch, with provisional jurisdiction over Russian parishes in Western Europe, and thus a provisional exarchate of the Ecumenical Patriarchate was created. That action caused a direct conflict between two Patriarchates (Constantinople and Moscow), leading to exchange of protests and accusations, without resolution.

Metropolitan Eulogius remained under the jurisdiction of Constantinople until 1944, when he decided to lead his community back into the Moscow Patriarchate. Reunion was formalized in 1945, but many important questions remained unsolved. After his death in 1946, a further break occurred in 1947, with a large number of parishes once again entering the Patriarchate of Constantinople.

The Provisional Exarchate was closed by Patriarch Athenagoras I through a letter dated 22 November 1965, with an assembly meeting 16–18 February 1966 noting that such provisional ethnic structures were no longer necessary, given that the passage of several generations had allowed immigrants to become accustomed to their new lands, which were now increasingly made up of converts to the faith. The implementation of those decisions was challenged, and subsequently reconsidered. On 22 January 1971, Patriarch Athenagoras I regulated the position of the archdiocese, under the Ecumenical Patriarchate, while recognising its internal autonomy.

New reorganization was implemented on 19 June 1999, when Patriarch Bartholomew I of Constantinople created the exarchate by granting it a tomos. According to the Exarchate's own account, Patriarch Bartholomew "recognised the full autonomy of the Archdiocese in administrative, pastoral and material terms".

On 8 June 2006 the Holy Synod of the Patriarchate of Constantinople received Bishop Basil (Osborne) along with a number of parishes and clergy in the United Kingdom from Moscow Patriarchate's Diocese of Sourozh. This act was caused substantial controversy, as he had not been released from the Moscow Patriarchate. The same statement gave Bishop Basil the new title, Bishop of Amphipolis (taken from an ancient see in Greece that no longer has a bishop), and charged him with the care of parishes in Great Britain and Ireland, as auxiliary bishop under Archbishop Gabriel of Komana in Paris. On 9 June 2006, the council of the archdiocese created the Episcopal Vicariate of Great Britain and Ireland during an extraordinary meeting. At that time, no such parishes existed. After his appointment, a number of parishes and communities, as well as some of the clergy and laity of the Diocese of Sourozh, followed Bishop Basil into the archdiocese and came to constitute the Episcopal Vicariate. Other parishes and communities were formed later, where none had previously existed, for example in Cumbria and Northampton. Since the retirement of Bishop Basil on 12 October 2009, it has become a deanery within the archdiocese. The formal name has become the Deanery of Great Britain and Ireland within the Archdiocese of Orthodox Parishes of Russian Tradition in Western Europe.

=== Revocation of Tomos by Ecumenical Patriarchate and aftermath ===
On 27 November 2018, the Synod of the Ecumenical Patriarchate decided unanimously to dissolve its exarchate of the Archdiocese of Russian Orthodox churches in Western Europe. According to communiqué, the Ecumenical Patriarchate "decided to revoke the patriarchal tomos of 1999 by which it granted pastoral care and administration of orthodox parishes of Russian tradition in Western Europe to His Archbishop-Exarch. [...] [T]he ecumenical patriarchate has decided to integrate and connect parishes to the various holy Metropolises of the ecumenical patriarchate in the countries where they are located."

On 23 February, the archdiocese held its Extraordinary General Assembly (EGA). 191 out of the 206 voters voted against the dissolution, 15 voted in favor of the dissolution. A new assembly may possibly be held in June to choose a jurisdiction. After the vote, Archbishop John of Charioupolis read a letter that Archbishop Anthony of Vienna and Budapest, head of the Moscow Patriarchate's Synodal Department for the Administration of Institutions Abroad, had written. In his letter, Anthony wrote that the Russian Orthodox Church was ready to receive the archdiocese under its jurisdiction. Following the assembly, the archdiocese published a communiqué that said: "For the moment, the life of the Archdiocese continues as on the eve of the EGA. In celebrations, the Archbishop commemorates the Ecumenical Patriarch and the parish clergy commemorate the Archbishop according to the canonical rule."

On 14 September, Archbishop John (Renneteau) personally joined the jurisdiction of the Moscow Patriarchate, and the ROC granted him the title of Archbishop of Dubna. According to the Russian media, the change of jurisdiction also applied to the clergymen subordinated to him and parishes that were willing to join the Moscow Patriarchate. Since 4 December 2020, the parishes and communities that remained in the archdiocese have been a part of the Patriarchate of Moscow, as direct continuation of the Diocesan Union of Russian Orthodox Associations in Western Europe.

== Structure and composition ==
As of December 2019, the archdiocese comprised 67 monasteries, parishes, and communities. The archdiocese is financially independent.

Perhaps the best known institution of the archdiocese is the St. Sergius Orthodox Theological Institute, founded in 1925 by Metropolitan Eulogius and sometime home of several well-known Orthodox theologians and writers of the twentieth century, including Georges Florovsky, Alexander Schmemann and John Meyendorff.

== Episcopal ordinaries ==
- Eulogius (Georgievsky) (1921–1946)
- Vladimir (Tikhonicky) (1946–1959)
- George (Tarassov) of Syracuse (1960–1981)
- George (Wagner) of Evdokia (1981–1993)
- Sergius (Konovalov) of Evkarpia (1993–2003)
- Gabriel (de Vylder) of Komana (2003–2013)
- Job (Getcha) of Telmessos (2013–2015), dismissed
- John (Renneteau) (2016–) removed from functions by the Holy Synod of the Ecumenical Patriarchate on 31 August 2019 This removal is disputed by the archdiocese. Received into the Moscow Patriarchate 14 September 2019

== See also ==
- Alexander Nevsky Cathedral, Paris
- Patriarchal Exarchate in Western Europe — An exarchate created by the Russian Orthodox Church in December 2018
- St. Sergius Orthodox Theological Institute (Paris, France)
- Assembly of Canonical Orthodox Bishops of Great Britain and Ireland
- Assembly of Canonical Orthodox Bishops of France
- Assembly of Canonical Orthodox Bishops of Belgium, Holland, and Luxembourg
- Assembly of Canonical Orthodox Bishops of Italy and Malta
- Assembly of Canonical Orthodox Bishops of Germany
- Assembly of Canonical Orthodox Bishops of Scandinavia

== Sources ==
- Kalkandjieva, Daniela (2015). The Russian Orthodox Church, 1917-1948: From Decline to Resurrection. New York: Routledge. ISBN 9781317657767.
- Kiminas, Demetrius (2009). The Ecumenical Patriarchate: A History of Its Metropolitanates with Annotated Hierarch Catalogs. Wildside Press. ISBN 9781434458766.
