= Gabriel of Komana =

- Patriarchal Exarchate for Orthodox Parishes of Russian Tradition in Western Europe
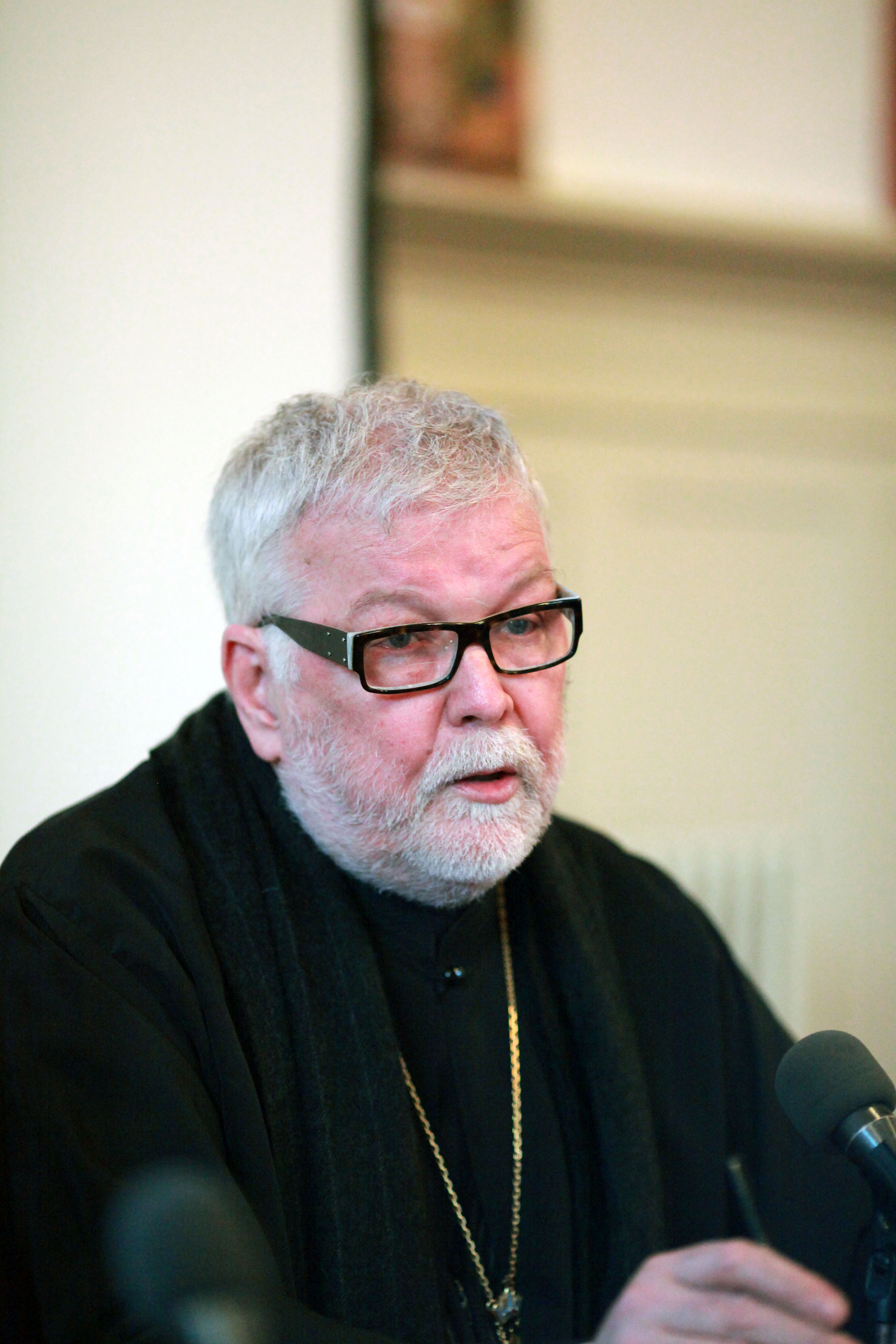
- Gabriel of Komana
- Installed: 2003
- Term ended: 2013
- Predecessor: Serge Konovalov
- Successor: Job Getcha

Orders
- Ordination: 27 June 1976
- Consecration: 24 June 2001

Personal details
- Born: Guido de Vylder; 13 June 1946 Lokeren, Belgium
- Died: 26 October 2013 (aged 67) Maastricht, Netherlands

Gabriel of Komana (born Guido de Vylder, 13 June 1946 – 26 October 2013) was an Eastern Orthodox archbishop of the Ecumenical Patriarchate who led the Patriarchal Exarchate for Orthodox Parishes of Russian Tradition in Western Europe from 2003 to 2013.

Born in Lokeren, Belgium, to a Catholic Flemish family, he studied philosophy and theology until 1974, afterwards obtaining his diploma in moral and religious studies at the University of Leuven. During this time he was introduced to Orthodox Christianity at the parish of St. Andrew in Ghent, becoming Orthodox in January 1974.

Ordained deacon on 5 October 1975 by Archbishop George Tarassov at the Alexander Nevsky Cathedral, Paris, he was ordained a celibate priest on 27 June 1976 at the same cathedral. In 1977 he was assigned as priest of the parish in Maastricht. He was also active in the foundation of Orthodox communities at Deventer, Breda and Antwerp. In 1992 he was appointed rector of the parish in Liege, Belgium. In 1998 he was additionally appointed rector of the parish of Maastricht.

Having taken monastic vows in 1994, he was elected and consecrated an auxiliary bishop of the exarchate in 2001. From December 2002 he acted as administrator of the exarchate during the final illness of his predecessor Archbishop Serge (Konovaloff). On 1 May 2003 he was elected to lead the exarchate. His election was formally confirmed on May 3 the same year. His enthronement took place in the Cathedral of St. Alexander Nevsky in Paris on 1 June 2004.

On 8 June 2006 the Holy Synod of the Patriarchate of Constantinople had met and issued a statement receiving Bishop Basil of Sergievo into the Patriarchate of Constantinople - an act that caused substantial controversy, as he had not been released from the Moscow Patriarchate. The same statement gave Bishop Basil the new title, Bishop of Amphipolis (taken from an ancient see in Greece that no longer has a bishop), and charged him with the care of parishes in Great Britain and Ireland, as auxiliary bishop under Archbishop Gabriel of Komana in Paris. One day after the Council of the Archdiocese during an extraordinary meeting created the Vicariate. At that time, no such parishes existed. After his appointment a number of parishes and communities, as well as some of the clergy and laity of the Diocese of Sourozh, followed Bishop Basil into the Archdiocese and came to constitute the Episcopal Vicariate. Other parishes and communities were formed later, where none had previously existed, for example in Cumbria, and Northampton.. Bishop Basil's first liturgical service as a member of the Archdiocese was a concelebration of the Divine Liturgy with Archbishop Gabriel in the Alexander Nevsky Cathedral in Paris on 18 June 2006. Statutes were adopted by the Episcopal Vicariate on 23 June 2007, and the Vicariate was registered as a charity (registration number 1124252) on 29 May 2008. Since Bishop Basil retired (on 12 October 2009) the Vicariate has become a deanery within the Archdiocese.

In January 2013 Archbishop Gabriel retired for health reasons, having been suffering from cancer, and returned to Maastricht. He died there on 26 October 2013.
