= Sergius (Konovalov) =

Eastern Orthodox archbishop (1941–2003)

Serge Konovalov
- Patriarchal Exarchate for Orthodox Parishes of Russian Tradition in Western Europe
- Installed: 27 June 1993
- Term ended: 22 January 2003
- Predecessor: George (Wagner)
- Successor: Gabriel of Comane

Orders
- Consecration: 27 June 1993

Personal details
- Born: 8 July 1941 Leuven, Belgium
- Died: 22 January 2003 (aged 61) Paris, France

Sergius of Evkarpia (born Sergey Alexeyevich Konovalov, Russian: Сергей Алексеевич Коновалов, French: Serge Konovaloff; 8 July 1941 in Leuven, Belgium – 22 January 2003 in Paris, France) was an Eastern Orthodox archbishop of the Ecumenical Patriarchate who led the Patriarchal Exarchate for Orthodox Parishes of Russian Tradition in Western Europe from 1993 to 2003.

== Biography ==
He studied Germanic languages at the University of Louvain. Serge had a brother, Alexander Konovaloff, who currently lives in Belgium.

He was married fathered three children, and was ordained a deacon in 1968 by Archbishop George (Tarassov) of Syracuse in Brussels and was elevated to the rank of protodeacon in 1976. He was ordained to the priesthood in 1980 by bishop George (Wagner) of Evdokia and was elevated to archpriest in 1985.

Following the death of his wife, by whom he had three children, he became a monk in 1990. In the same year he was elected to be the successor of the late Archbishop George (Wagner) as head of the exarchate. He was consecrated bishop in Paris on 27 June 1993. He died in Paris on 22 January 2003.

== Sources ==
- Вестник Русского христианского движения. — Париж, 1993. — № 167. — С. 245—246.
- Evêque Gabriel de Comane Archevêque Serge (Konovalov) Evêque diocésain de 1993 à 2003. // Messager Diocésain, n° 16, juin 2003, pp. 11–13
- Париж прощается с владыкой Сергием // «Русская мысль». Париж. — 2003. — № 4441, 30 января
- Крикорьян С. Н. Архиепископ Сергий (Коновалов) из личных воспоминаний / Подг. текста, публикация и примечания Д. А. Агеева // Церковь и время. — 2005. — № 4(33). — С. 235—244.
- архимандрит Савва (Тутунов), епископ Корсунский Нестор Ходатай о русском единстве — памяти архипастыря русских приходов в Западной Европе // prichod.ru, 22.01.2013
