= 2019 in religion =

This is a timeline of events during the year 2019 which relate to religion.

== Events ==
- 5 January – The Orthodox Church of Ukraine is granted independence from the Russian Orthodox Church by the Ecumenical Patriarchate of Constantinople.
- 22 January – The Catholic World Youth Day 2019 event begins in Panama City.
- 27 January – The Jolo Cathedral in Jolo, Philippines is bombed by Islamist terrorists associated with Abu Sayyaf.
- 10 February – Widespread sexual abuse cases in Southern Baptist churches were reported by the media
- 21 February – The Catholic Church holds the Meeting on the Protection of Minors in the Church.
- 15 March – A white supremacist gunman attacks two mosques in Christchurch, New Zealand.
- 26 March – An arsonist in St. Landry Parish, Louisiana burns down three Black churches over several days.
- 15 April – A structure fire breaks out in the Notre-Dame de Paris.
- 21 April – Churches, among other targets, are attacked in Sri Lanka on Easter in coordinated bombings carried out by ISIS.
- 27 April – A gunman attacks the Chabad of Poway synagogue in Poway, California on the final day of Passover.
- May – British neo-charismatic organization Jesus Army announces its closure after years of sexual abuse scandals.
- 3 May – The Çamlıca Mosque, the largest mosque in Turkey, is inaugurated.
- 6 May – Riots break out in Sri Lanka in which rioters randomly attack Muslims and mosques.
- 10 June – American Jewish conversion therapy provider JIFGA is ordered to dissolve after it is found to be a fraudulent continuation of JONAH.
- June 17 – In Canada, Quebec passed Bill 21, a law which bars public servants from wearing religious symbols while on duty.
- July 9 – In Canada, The Crucifix in the National Assembly of Quebec that Quebec Premier Maurice Duplessis hung there in 1936 (83 years), is removed.
- 16 August – The Sri Lankan Buddhist orders Amarapura Nikāya and Rāmañña Nikāya merge to form the Amarapura–Rāmañña Nikāya.
- 6 October – The Synod of Bishops for the Pan-Amazon region meets in Rome.

=== Undated ===
- Joining of the Archdiocese of Russian Orthodox churches in Western Europe to the Moscow Patriarchate
- Mary 2.0
