= George Wagner (bishop) =

- Patriarchal Exarchate for Orthodox Parishes of Russian Tradition in Western Europe
- Installed: 1981
- Term ended: 1993
- Predecessor: George Tarassov
- Successor: Serge Konovalov

Orders
- Ordination: 1955
- Consecration: October 3, 1971

Personal details
- Born: March 10, 1930 Berlin
- Died: April 6, 1993 (aged 63) Paris

George of Evdokias (born Georg Wagner; March 10, 1930 in Berlin, Germany – April 6, 1993 in Paris) was an Eastern Orthodox archbishop who led the Patriarchal Exarchate for Orthodox Parishes of Russian Tradition in Western Europe from 1981 to 1993, under the jurisdiction of the Ecumenical Patriarchate of Constantinople.

Having studied theology at the St. Sergius Orthodox Theological Institute in Paris (where he later served as a professor), he was ordained in 1955 into the Russian Orthodox Church for service in that city.

He became a monk, and archimandrite. In October 1971 he was consecrated as Bishop of Evdokias (titular see), and appointed assistant bishop to Archbishop George Tarassov. In May 1981, he was elected to be the successor of Archbishop George as head of the exarchate, and was granted the title of Archbishop.

Рainful illness that occurred during the summer of 1992, a varicose vein, did not allow him to resume the courses of his last academic year. Bishop George who was no longer able to stand, went through the most difficult tests for the bishop, the theologian and the liturgist, for he could no longer celebrate the liturgy. Overcoming the pain, of which he never complained, he had to preside over the Eucharistic liturgy in the cathedral on the feast of the Holy Encounter on February 15, 1993. He died April 6, 1993.

== Sources ==
- Kiminas, Demetrius (2009). The Ecumenical Patriarchate: A History of Its Metropolitanates with Annotated Hierarch Catalogs. Wildside Press. ISBN 9781434458766.
