= Job Getcha =

Orthodox Metropolitan of Pisidia

His Eminence Job
- Metropolitan of Pisidia
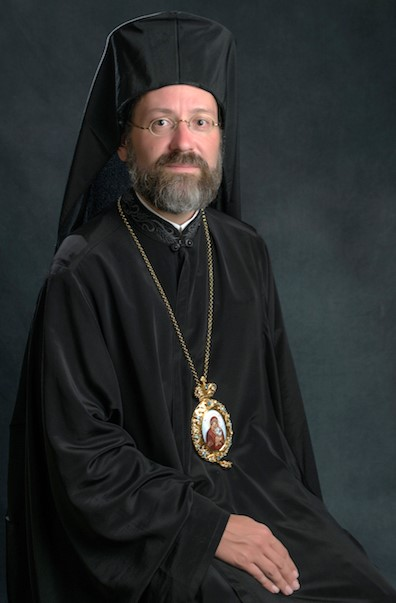
- Installed: 17 September 2022
- Predecessor: Sotiros (Trambas)
- Other post: Permanent Representative of the Ecumencical Patriarchate to the World Council of Churches (2015-
- Previous post: Patriarchal Exarch for Orthodox Parishes of Russian Tradition in Western Europe (2013-2015)

Orders
- Ordination: June 20, 2003
- Consecration: November 30, 2013

Personal details
- Born: Ihor Wladimir Getcha; 31 January 1974 (age 52) Montreal, Quebec, Canada
- Denomination: Eastern Orthodox
- Education: University of Manitoba

Job of Pisidia (born Ihor Wladimir Getcha, Ukrainian: Ігор Володимирович Геча, romanized: Ihor Volodymyrovych Hecha, Russian: Игорь Владимирович Геча; January 31, 1974) is an Eastern Orthodox Metropolitan of the Ecumenical Patriarchate who is the Permanent Representative of the Ecumenical Patriarchate to the World Council of Churches and the Dean of the Institute for Orthodox Theology Higher Studies at Chambésy, Switzerland. He was the Archbishop of Telmessos and was elected on July 22, 2022, as the new metropolitan of Pisidia.

== Biography ==
Born in Montreal, Quebec, Canada, a Canadian of Ukrainian descent, Ihor Getcha was educated at Collège Français (Montreal) and the University of Manitoba, Winnipeg. He studied theology at St. Andrew's College, Manitoba, and then he received in Paris a doctorate, jointly with the Institut Catholique de Paris, in 2003.

Upon completing his secondary education, he completed post-secondary studies in humanities at the University of Manitoba and theology at St. Andrew's College in Winnipeg and at St. Sergius Orthodox Theological Institute in Paris, where, in 1998 he received his master's diploma. In 2003, he received his doctorate diploma from the above institute in cooperation with the Catholic University of Paris and in 2012 he got his habilitation in theology at the University of Lorraine in Metz. He was tonsured a monk and ordained deacon of the Ukrainian Orthodox Church of Canada at Saint Sophia Cathedral, Montreal in 1996 by Metropolitan Wasyly of Winnipeg, subsequently serving in Paris. In 1998, he was tonsured in the Small Schema at the Monastery of St. Anthony the Great in Saint-Laurent-en-Royans, France and in 2003, in Paris, Archbishop Gabriel of Comana ordained him as Presbyter, eventually receiving the title of Archimandrite. Between 2001 and 2008 he lectured at St. Sergius Institute, where he has also served as Dean (2005–2008). Since 2003, he teaches liturgical theology at the Catholic University of Paris. In 2009 he was elected Professor of Liturgical and of Dogmatic Theology at the Institute of Graduate Studies of Orthodox Theology in Chambésy, Geneva, Switzerland.

The Archbishop has published a plethora of studies and articles related to liturgical theology and Orthodox spirituality. He speaks French, English, Ukrainian, Russian and Greek.

== Election as Exarch of Russian Tradition in Western Europe and criticism ==
His election as Patriarchal Exarch for Orthodox Parishes of Russian Tradition in Western Europe in November 2013 was heavily influenced by the Ecumenical Patriarch, Bartholomew I of Constantinople, his consecration taking place on 30 November of the same year in the Patriarchal Church, by the Patriarch and by Synodal Hierarchs. As a consequence, the election of Archbishop Job was achieved after two unknown names were placed on the ballot at a late stage in the election process, inducing the electors to vote for Job Getcha. Job Getcha's tenure as archbishop was marked by deep divisions within the archdiocese concerning the manner in which he has discharged his pastoral responsibilities.

== Promotion to Patriarchate's representative ==
On 28 November 2015, the Holy Synod of the Ecumenical Patriarchate appointed Archbishop Job as the Patriarchate's representative to the World Council of Churches in Geneva and removed him from the office of Exarch, leaving him an Archbishop without pastoral or administrative responsibility over the Archdiocese he had previously overseen. Job Getcha has been described as representing a new generation of ecumenical dialogue among the Christian Churches, and has been characterized by his Latin Catholic counterparts on the Commission for Theological Dialogue as a discreet and serious theologian.

On February 20, 2019, Archbishop Job was appointed Dean of the Institute for Orthodox Theology Higher Studies at Chambésy (Geneva).

Archbishop Job was elected Metropolitan of Pisidia after the passing of late Metropolitan Sotiros and was enthroned 17 September 2022.

He is a patron of the Fellowship of Saint Alban and Saint Sergius.
