= Alexander Schmemann =

Christian theologian (1921–1983)

The Reverend Alexander Schmemann
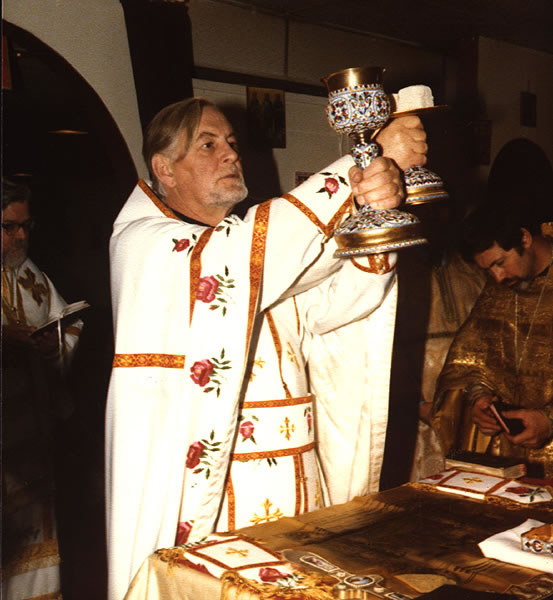
- Schmemann at a 1982 liturgy

Dean of Saint Vladimir's Orthodox Theological Seminary
- In office 1962–1983
- Preceded by: Leontius Turkevich
- Succeeded by: John Meyendorff

Personal details
- Born: 13 September 1921 Tallinn, Estonia
- Died: 13 December 1983 (aged 62) Yonkers, New York, U.S.
- Resting place: St. Tikhon Cemetery, South Canaan, Wayne County (PA), U.S.
- Children: 3, including Serge
- Church: Orthodox Church in America
- Ordained: 22 October 1946
- Title: Protopresbyter

Alexander Dmitrievich Schmemann (also Shmeman; Russian: Александр Дмитриевич Шмеман; 13 September 1921 – 13 December 1983) was an influential Orthodox priest, theologian, and author who spent most of his career in the United States.

Born in Estonia to émigrés from the Russian Revolution, he grew up primarily in France, where there was a large émigré community in Paris. After being educated there in both Russian and French schools and universities from 1946 to 1951, he taught in Paris. That year he immigrated with his family to New York City to teach at Saint Vladimir's Orthodox Theological Seminary. In 1962, he was selected as dean of the Seminary, serving in this position until his death. For 30 years, his sermons in Russian were broadcast by Radio Liberty into the Soviet Union, where they were influential as a voice from beyond the Iron Curtain.

Schmemann was among the leaders in forming the Orthodox Church in America as an autocephalous institution, which status it gained from the Russian Orthodox Church in 1970. While identifying strongly as Russian, Schmemann sought to make the OCA independent of any ethnic or national group and open to all peoples. He believed the Orthodox Church had a mission to the West. In his teachings and writings, he explored the many ways that Christian liturgy was an expression of Christian theology.

== Early life and studies ==
Alexander Schmemann was born as one of twin boys in 1921 in Tallinn, Estonia, into a family of Russian émigrés from St. Petersburg. His twin brother was named Andrei. Their grandfather Nikolai Schmemann had been a Lutheran of Baltic German ancestry, who served as a senator and a member of the State Council in St. Petersburg, along with numerous other foreigners. After Schmemann married a Russian Orthodox woman, their children were raised in that tradition, as required by the state. His father Dmitry, was studying law when interrupted by the First World War. He served as an officer of the Imperial Life-Guards, also in St. Petersburg. After the Revolution broke out, Schmemann fought with the Life-Guards and other anti-Bolshevik forces, but they were ultimately pushed into Estonia, where they disbanded.

When Schmemann was a child, his family moved to Paris, France, where, like most children of the large émigré community, he was first educated in Russian-language schools. There were tens of thousands of Russians in Paris, generally gathered in St. Petersburg and Moscow-affiliated communities. But Schmemann also chose to go to a French lycée. During this period, he served as an altar boy and subdeacon at Saint Alexander Nevsky Cathedral, participating in the liturgy and building his life in the church. In college, he studied the Orthodox church and Christian history related to the Byzantine and Roman churches more deeply. At the University of Paris (1940–1945), he wrote a thesis on theocracy and the Eastern Roman Empire. He began graduate studies at St. Sergius Orthodox Theological Institute, also in Paris.

In 1943, Schmemann married Juliana Osorguine (also spelled as Osorgina) (1923–2017), whose family after the Revolution had been expelled from their estate, which included the village of Sergiyevskoye (now Koltsovo) south of Moscow. Her family was also émigrés in Paris, where Russians gathered in St. Petersburg and Moscow-related communities. The Osorguines attended a small Russian Orthodox Church in Clamart near Paris, known as Saints Constantine and Helen Church. After their marriage, Schmemann completed his five-year program of theological studies in 1945 at the St. Sergius Institute. He studied with the noted Russian theologian, Archpriest Sergei Bulgakov, among others. He was also influenced by major thinkers involved in the theological revival of French Roman Catholicism, such as Jean Daniélou, Louis Bouyer, and several others.

The couple had three children together in France: a daughter born in 1944, a son Serge Schmemann born in 1945, and another daughter, born in 1948. All grew up speaking and identifying as Russian, although they also drew from French and American cultures. They moved to the United States in 1951. Serge Schmemann later became a journalist. His assignments included working for the Associated Press (AP) and The New York Times in the Soviet Union and, after the dissolution, in Russia for several years.

== Career ==
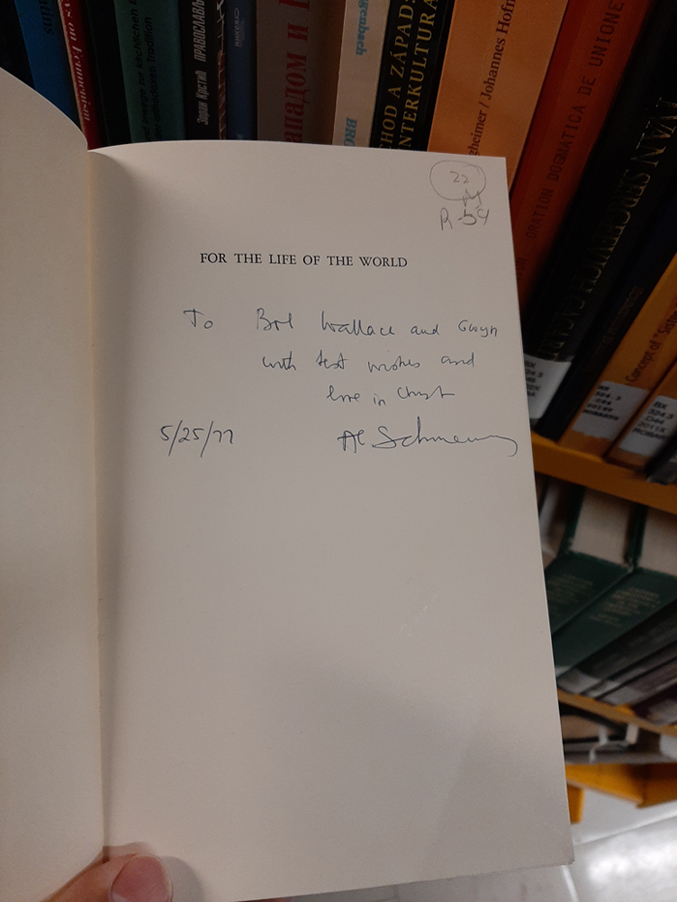
A signed copy of For the Life of the World by Fr. Alexander Schmemann (located in Robarts Library)

On 22 October 1946, Schmemann was ordained to the presbyterate of the Orthodox Church by Metropolitan Vladimir (Tikhonicky). From 1946 to 1951, he taught church history at St. Sergius Institute in Paris. After moving to the United States (see below), he completed his doctorate at St. Sergius Institute in 1959, with Fr. Nicholas Afanassieff and Fr. John Meyendorff acting as examiners.

Schmemann was invited by Father Georges Florovsky, who had briefly taught in Paris after being rescued in 1947 from Soviet-dominated Czechoslovakia, to join the faculty of Saint Vladimir's Orthodox Theological Seminary, which had been established in 1938 in New York City. He and his family immigrated to the United States in 1951. This postwar period was one of considerable immigration of Russian émigrés to the US. Many settled in and around New York, including in towns on Long Island, such as Sea Cliff, Glen Cove, and Oyster Bay.

When the seminary moved to its present campus in Crestwood, New York in 1962, Father Alexander was selected for the post of dean, which he would hold until his death. He also served as adjunct professor at Columbia University, New York University, Union Theological Seminary, and General Theological Seminary in New York, extending the connections of the Orthodox Church in America. Much of his focus at St Vladimir's was on liturgical theology, which emphasizes the liturgical tradition of the Church as a major sign and expression of the Christian faith.

He was invited as an Orthodox observer to the Second Vatican Council of the Catholic Church, held from 1962 to 1965.

Teaching generations of future clergy at St. Vladimir's, Schmemann was active in the establishment of the Orthodox Church in America. From its beginnings related to colonial Russian missionaries in Alaska, it had expanded through the 20th century to incorporate new immigrant Orthodox populations from Greece and southeastern Europe. By the mid-20th century, it was known as the Russian Orthodox Greek Catholic Orthodox Church, reflecting these congregations. In 1970, the OCA was granted autocephaly by the Russian Orthodox Church. The Churches of Constantinople, Antioch, and most of the remaining Orthodox churches remained in communion with the OCA, but did not recognize it as autocephalous, saying it was not a unified church.

Since 1970, the OCA has become largely an American church: Metropolitan Theodosius was the first American-born primate of the church, serving from 1974 to his retirement in 2002. By that time, the church had 900,000 members in 725 parishes, and in many churches, the services were in English. The original Metropolia had ten dioceses, and there were also dioceses for Bulgarian, Romanian, and Albanian congregations. There are also several parishes in Mexico, organized as what is known as the Exarchate of Mexico.

Thousands of Schmemann's Russian-language sermons were broadcast into the Soviet Union on Radio Liberty over a period of 30 years. He gained a broad following of listeners across the Soviet Union, although the government tried to block these broadcasts. Among them was the writer Aleksandr Solzhenitsyn; the two men became friends after Solzhenitsyn immigrated to the West.

At the time of his death, Schmemann was the dean of the Saint Vladimir's Orthodox Theological Seminary, a position he had held since 1962. Schmemann died of cancer in 1983 in Crestwood, New York, where the seminary was located in Westchester County just north of the city.

== Legacy ==
Fr Schmemann was accorded the title of protopresbyter, the highest honor that can be bestowed on a married Orthodox priest. He was awarded honorary degrees from Butler University, General Theological Seminary, Lafayette College, Iona College, and Holy Cross Greek Orthodox School of Theology.

Schmemann's work, including entire courses on his theology, are taught at theological schools. In 2018, the Metropolitan Andrey Sheptytsky Institute of Eastern Christian Studies at St. Michael's College in Toronto offered a course titled The Liturgical Theology of Alexander Schmemann (1921-1983).

In 1984, soon after his death, CBS network produced a documentary about him and his work, The Spirit of St. Vladimir's.

== Works ==
Fr. Schmemann published many books and articles, some directed at general readers. For the Life of the World, a popular volume on Christian faith as reflected in liturgy, has been translated into eleven languages. Originally prepared as a study guide for the National Student Christian Federation in 1963, it was published anonymously by the underground samizdat in the Soviet Union.

The Eucharist was finished just before Schmemann's death. This and several collections of his writings were published posthumously.

- Introduction to Liturgical Theology (1961)
- The Historical Road of Eastern Orthodoxy (1963)
  - (Françoise Lhoest and Daniel Struve, translators) Le Chemin Historique de l'Orthodoxie (Paris: YMCA-Press, 1995)
- Great Lent: Journey to Pascha (1969; revised ed. 1974)
  - Le Grand Carême : ascèse et liturgie dans l'Église orthodoxe (Abbaye de Bellefontaine, 1999) ISBN 9782855890135
- For the Life of the World: Sacraments and Orthodoxy (1970)
  - Pour la vie du monde (Paris: Desclée)
- Liturgy and Life: Christian Development Through Liturgical Experience (1974)
- Of Water and the Spirit: A Liturgical Study of Baptism (1974)
- Ultimate Questions: An Anthology of Modern Russian Religious Thought (1977)
- Church, World, Mission: Reflections on Orthodoxy in the West (1979)
- The Eucharist: Sacrament of the Kingdom (1988)
  - L'Eucharistie, sacrement du Royaume (Paris: YMCA-Press)
- Celebration of Faith: I Believe... (1991)
- Celebration of Faith: The Church Year (1994)
- Celebration of Faith: The Virgin Mary (1995)
- The Journals of Father Alexander Schmemann 1973–1983 (St. Vladimir's Seminary Press, 2000) ISBN 9780881412000
- Our Father Translated by Alexis Vinogradov (St. Vladimir's Seminary Press, 2001) ISBN 9780881412345
- Liturgy and Tradition: Theological Reflections of Alexander Schmemann Edited by Thomas Fisch (2003) ISBN 9780881410822
- O Death, Where Is Thy Sting? Translated by Alexis Vinogradov (St. Vladimir's Seminary Press, 2003) ISBN 9780881412383
- The Liturgy of Death: Four Previously Unpublished Talks Edited by Alexis Vinogradov (St. Vladimir's Seminary Press, 2017) ISBN 9780881415568
- A Voice For Our Time: Radio Liberty Talks, Volume 1 Translated by Alexis Vinogradov and Nathan Williams (2021) ISBN 9780881416794
- Foundations of Russian Culture. Translated by Nathan Williams (Holy Trinity Seminary Press, 2023) ISBN 9781942699507

== See also ==
- Sergei Bulgakov
- Divine Liturgy
- Eastern Orthodox Christian theology
- Eucharistic theology
- Pavel Florensky
- Georges Florovsky
- Thomas Hopko
- Vladimir Lossky
- John Meyendorff
- Michael Pomazansky
- John Romanides

Academic offices
| Preceded by Leontius (Turkevich) | Dean of Saint Vladimir's Orthodox Theological Seminary; 1962–1983 | Succeeded by John Meyendorff |
