= Michel Evdokimov =

French theologian and priest (1930–2025)

- Михаил Евдокимов
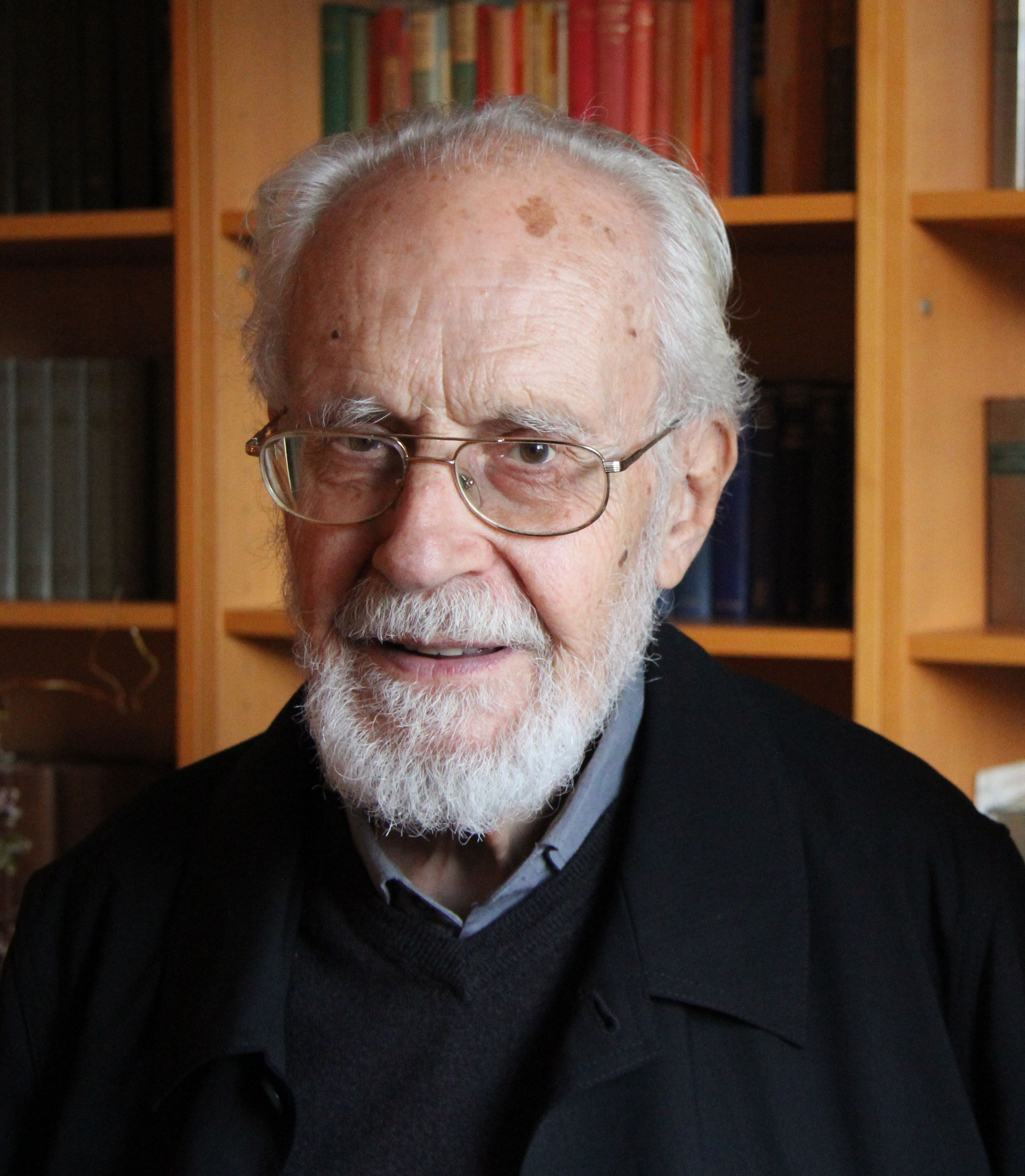
- Evdokimov in 2012
- Born: Michel Pavlovich Evdokimov; 19 September 1930; Menton, France
- Died: 1 July 2025 (aged 94); Sainte-Geneviève-des-Bois, France
- Occupation(s): Theologian; Priest

Michel Evdokimov (Mikhail Pavlovich Evdokimov, Russian: Михаил Павлович Евдокимов; 19 September 1930 – 1 July 2025) was a French theologian and priest of the Russian Orthodox Church.

== Biography ==
Born in Menton on 19 September 1930, Evdokimov was the son of Paul Evdokimov and Nathalie Brunel. He earned an agrégation in English and taught at the École alsacienne before earning his doctorate in 1979. He was then a professor of comparative literature at the University of Poitiers and specialized in French, English, and Russian literature, notably the works of Fyodor Dostoevsky. He also taught at the Collège des Bernardins and was president of the Inter-Church Relations Committee at the Assembly of Canonical Orthodox Bishops of France. He was engaged in ecumenism with his father, with whom he founded an Orthodox church in Châtenay-Malabry. He was also a choirmaster at the Paroisse de la Très Sainte Trinité before becoming a priest.

Evdokimov died in Sainte-Geneviève-des-Bois on 1 July 2025, at the age of 94.

== Essays ==
- Lumières d'Orient (1981)
- Pèlerins russes et vagabonds mystiques (1987)
- L’Orthodoxie (1990)
- Le Christ dans la tradition et la littérature russes (1996)
- Une voix chez les orthodoxes (1996)
- Les Chrétiens orthodoxes (2000)
- Ouvrir son cœur - Un chemin spirituel (2004)
- Petite vie du père Men (2005)
- La Prière des chrétiens de Russie (2007)
- Prier 15 jours avec Saint Séraphim de Sarov (2008)
- Prier 15 jours avec Alexandre Men (2010)
- Huit saints pour notre temps (2012)
- Deux martyrs dans un monde sans Dieu - Dietrich Bonhoeffer et Alexandre Men (2015)
