= Paul Evdokimov =

Russian-French philosopher and theologian

Paul Nikolaevich Evdokimov (Russian: Павел Николаевич Евдокимов) (August 2 [O.S. July 20], 1901 – September 16, 1970) was an Orthodox Christian theologian, professor at the St. Sergius Orthodox Theological Institute, and émigré.

Paul Evdokimov's theological thought is marked by the attempt to synthesise two important currents in 20th century Orthodox thought, namely the "neo-patristic" renewal and the insights of the Russian religious philosophers.

== Life ==
Born in Saint Petersburg to a noble family, Evdokimov was forced to leave Russia in the wake of the October Revolution. Fleeing first to Constantinople (now Istanbul), the family then moved to Paris, where a large community of Russian émigrés had found refuge. In this milieu, Evdokimov met and collaborated with leading émigré thinkers such as Sergei Bulgakov and Nikolai Berdyaev.

In 1927, Paul Evdokimov married Natasha Brunel, a French teacher of Russian origin, and moved to Menton, Provence. They had two children, Nina (1928) and Michel (1930–2025). With the advent of World War II and the Italian occupation of Menton, the family moved to Valence, Drôme. In 1942, Evdokimov defended his PhD thesis on Dostoyevsky and the problem of evil.

The end of the war coincided with Brunel's death from cancer, and the family relocated to Paris. There Evdokimov became involved in the French Resistance via the Cimade refugee aid group. This work continued after the end of the war, and in 1953, Paul became a professor in the St. Sergius Orthodox Theological Institute in Paris.

Paul Evdokimov remarried in 1954, to Tomoko Sakai, an English-Japanese interpreter. From 1958 to 1961, he published several books on Orthodox theology. Evdokimov continued to participate in ecumenical organisations throughout the 1960s, and received a doctorate honoris causa from the University of Thessaloniki. He died in his sleep on September 16, 1970.

== Influences ==
Evdokimov was influenced by the following: Sergei Bulgakov, Nikolai Berdyaev, Nicholas Afanasiev, Lev Gillet, Anton Kartashev, Georgy Fedotov, Carl Jung, Fyodor Dostoevsky, Simone Weil, Dietrich Bonhoeffer, Simone de Beauvoir and Sigmund Freud.

== Works ==
- Dostoïevski et le problème du mal (1942)
  - (de Corlevour Editions, 2014) ISBN 9782915831825
- Le Mariage, sacrement de l'amour (1944)
- La Femme et le salut du monde: Étude d'Anthropologie chrétienne sur les charismes de la femme (Casterman, 1958)
  - Femeia și mântuirea lumii (1995)
  - Die Frau und das Heil der Welt (1989)
  - Woman and the Salvation of the World: A Christian Anthropology on the Charisms of Women (St. Vladimir's Seminary Press, 1997)
  - Женщина и спасение мира (2015)
- L'Orthodoxie (1959), for which Evdokimov received a doctorate from the St. Sergius Institute.
  - Православие (2012)
- Gogol et Dostoïevski ou la descente aux enfers (1961)
  - Der Abstieg in der Hölle, Gogol und Dostojewski (Salzburg: Müller, 1965)
  - (Corlevour, 2011) ISBN 9782915831399
- Le Sacrement de l'amour: Le mystère conjugal à la lumière de la tradition orthodoxe (1962)
  - (1977) ISBN 9782704500567
  - The Sacrament of Love: The Nuptial Mystery in the Light of the Orthodox Tradition (1985)
  - Таинство любви: тайна супружества в свете православного Предания (2011)
- Les Âges de la vie spirituelle: Des pères du desert à nos jours (1964)
  - The Struggle with God (Paulist, 1966)
  - Vârstele vieții spirituale (1993)
  - Ages of the Spiritual Life (1998)
  - Этапы духовной жизни: От отцов-пустынников до наших дней (2003)
- La Connaissance de Dieu selon la tradition orientale: l'enseignement patristique, liturgique et iconographique (1968)
- L'Esprit-Saint dans la tradition orthodoxe (1969)
- Le Christ dans la pensée russe (1970) ISBN 9782204026185
  - Christus im russischen Denken (Trier: Paulinus-Verlag, 1977)
  - (Editions du Cerf, 1986)
- L'Art de l'icône: Théologie de la beauté (Desclée de Brouwer, 1972)
  - The Art of the Icon: A Theology of Beauty (1990)
  - El Arte Del Icono: Teología De La Belleza (Madrid, 1991)
  - Искусство иконы: Богословие красоты (2005)
- L'Amour fou de Dieu (1973) ISBN 9782020032018
- La Nouveauté de l'Esprit (Abbaye de Bellefontaine, 1977) ISBN 9782855890203
- Le Buisson Ardent (Editions P. Lethielleux, 1981) ISBN 9782249610073
