= Saint-Laurent-en-Royans =

- Commune
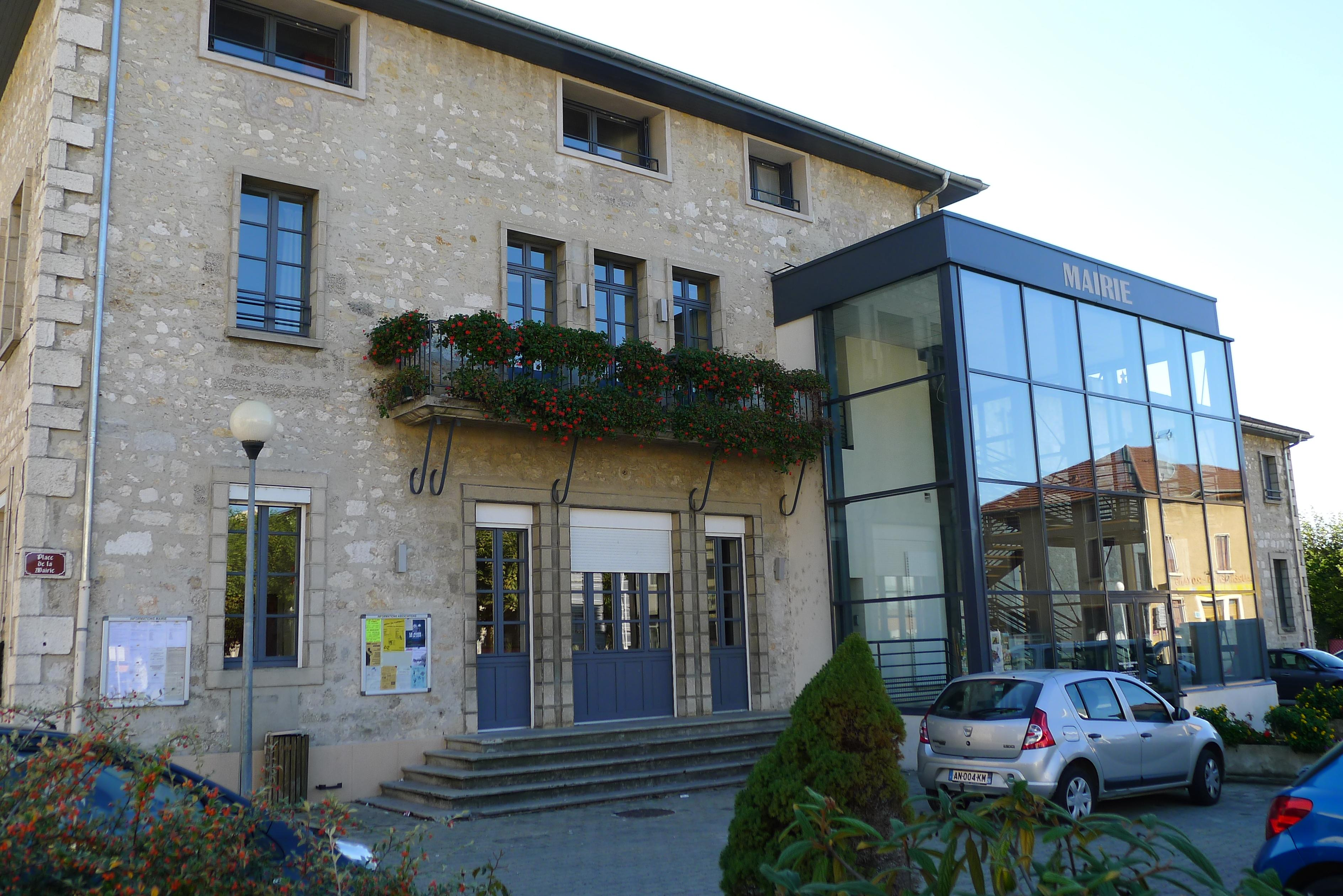
- The town hall of Saint-Laurent-en-Royans
- Location of Saint-Laurent-en-Royans
- Location within France Location within Auvergne-Rhône-Alpes
- Coordinates: 45°01′41″N 5°19′37″E
- Country: France
- Region: Auvergne-Rhône-Alpes
- Department: Drôme
- Arrondissement: Die
- Canton: Vercors-Monts du Matin

Government
  - Mayor (2020–2026): Olivier Beraldin
- Area^{1}: 27.39 km^{2} (10.58 sq mi)
- Elevation: 311 m (1,020 ft)
- Highest elevation: 1,400 m (4,600 ft)
- Lowest elevation: 171 m (561 ft)
- Population (2023): 1,377
  - Density: 50.27/km^{2} (130.2/sq mi)
- Time zone: UTC+01:00 (CET)
  - Summer (DST): UTC+02:00 (CEST)
- INSEE/Postal code: 26311 /26190
- ^{1} French Land Register data, which excludes lakes, ponds, glaciers > 1 km^{2} (0.386 sq mi or 247 acres) and river estuaries.

Saint-Laurent-en-Royans (French pronunciation: [sɛ̃ lɔʁɑ̃ ɑ̃ ʁwajɑ̃]; Occitan: Sant Laurenç de Roians) is a commune in the Drôme department in southeastern France. It is situated to the north of Saint-Jean-en-Royans, and to the west of Combe Laval.

== Population ==
Historical population
Year	Pop.	±% p.a.
1968	1,032	—
1975	1,110	+1.05%
1982	1,137	+0.34%
1990	1,330	+1.98%
1999	1,218	−0.97%
2007	1,306	+0.88%
2012	1,307	+0.02%
2017	1,419	+1.66%
2023	1,377	−0.50%
Source: INSEE

== See also ==
- Communes of the Drôme department
- Parc naturel régional du Vercors
