= George Tarassov =

- Patriarchal Exarchate for Orthodox Parishes of Russian Tradition in Western Europe
- Installed: 1960
- Term ended: 1981
- Predecessor: Vladimir Tikhonicky
- Successor: George Wagner

Orders
- Ordination: 3 February 1930
- Consecration: 4 October 1953

Personal details
- Born: 14 April 1893 Voronezh, Russia
- Died: 22 March 1981 (aged 87) Paris, France

George of Syracuse (born Georgy Vasilyevich Tarassov, Russian: Георгий Васильевич Тарасов 14 April 1893 in Voronezh, Russia – 22 March 1981 in Paris, France) was an Eastern Orthodox archbishop of the Ecumenical Patriarchate who led the Patriarchal Exarchate for Orthodox Parishes of Russian Tradition in Western Europe from 1960 to 1981.

A chemical engineer by training, Tarassov settled in Belgium in 1919. He was ordained deacon in 1928 by Metropolitan Eulogius (Georgiyevsky) of Paris, and priest in 1930. He served as rector of various parishes in Belgium, including Brussels from 1940. In 1953 he was consecrated as auxiliary bishop under Metropolitan. Vladimir (Tikhonicky), with responsibility for parishes in Benelux and Germany. Archbishop George was elected to lead the exarchate after the death of Vladimir in 1959.
