= Vladimir Tikhonicky =

Russian archbishop and metropolitan of Orthodox churches

- metropolitan of the Russian Orthodox church in Western Europe
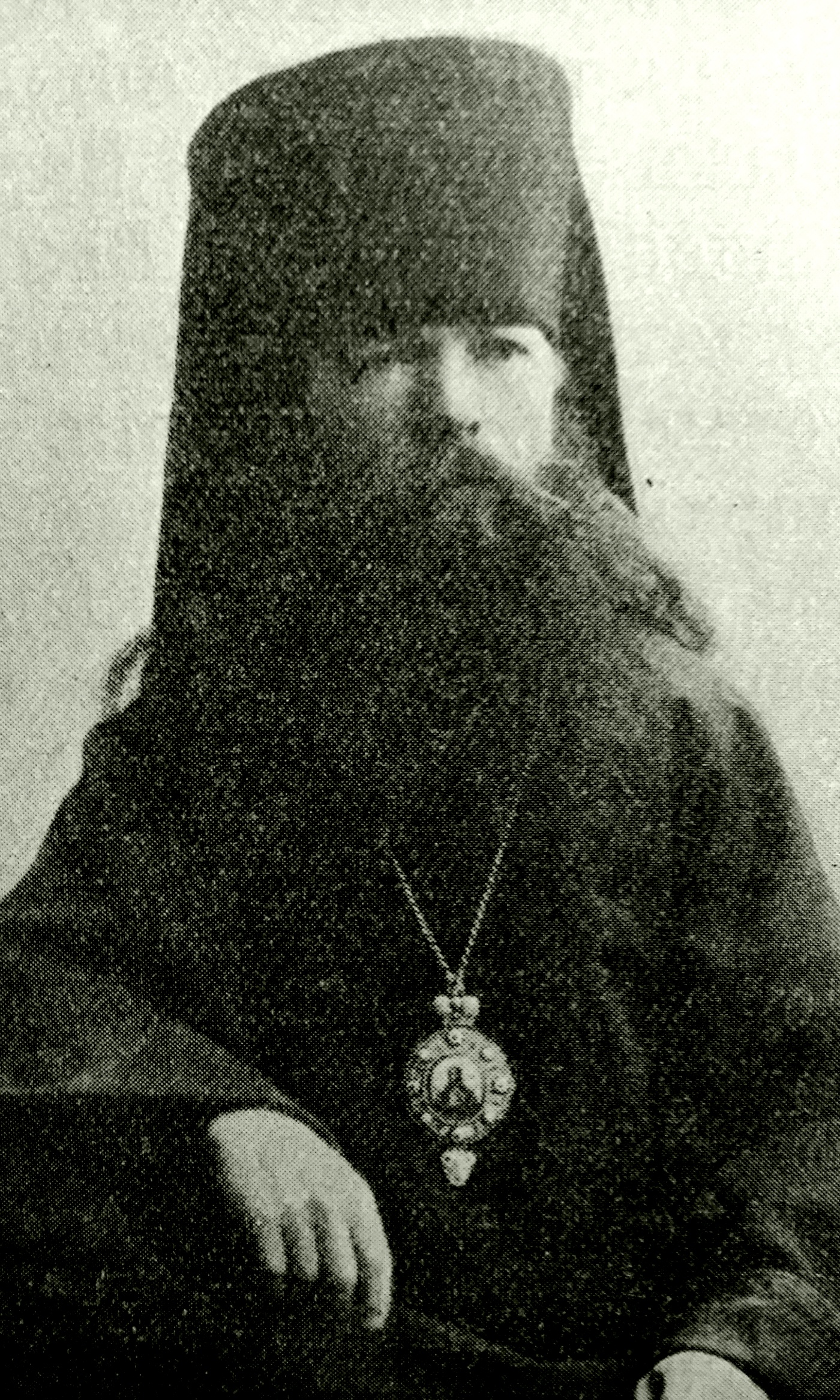
- Installed: 1946
- Term ended: 1959
- Predecessor: Evlogy Georgievsky
- Successor: George Tarassov

Orders
- Consecration: 3 June 1907

Personal details
- Born: 22 March 1873 Russia
- Died: 18 December 1959 (aged 86) Paris, France

Metropolitan Vladimir (born Vyacheslav Mikhaylovich Tikhonitsky, Вячеслав Михайлович Тихони́цкий; 22 March 1873 – 18 December 1959 in Paris) was an Eastern Orthodox archbishop and metropolitan of, successively, the Moscow Patriarchate, Russian Orthodox Church Outside Russia and the Ecumenical Patriarchate. He was head of the Patriarchal Exarchate for Orthodox Parishes of Russian Tradition in Western Europe from 1946 to 1959.

Born in the village of Orlov in Viatka, Russia he was educated at the local diocesan seminary and at the Kazan Theological Academy, taking monastic vows there in 1897.

Vladimir was consecrated as an auxiliary bishop of the Diocese of Grodno on 3 June 1907. He attended the All-Russian Church Council of 1917-1918 after which he returned to Grodno which had become part of the new Republic of Poland. In 1923, he was expelled by the Polish government. Traveling to Czechoslovakia, Bishop Vladimir joined the Western European exarchate of the Russian Church under Metropolitan Eulogius (Georgiyevsky) who installed him as rector of St. Nicholas Church in Nice, France in February 1925.

Vladimir remained with Eulogius as the exarchate accepted the jurisdiction of the Ecumenical Patriarchate in 1931, before returning in 1945 as an exarchate of the Moscow Patriarchate.

After Eulogius died in 1946, Archbishop Vladimir became locum tenens. However, with the appointment of Metropolitan Seraphim (Lukyanov) by the Moscow Patriarchate as Exarch, most of the parishes, under Vladimir, once again broke away and rejoined the Ecumenical Patriarchate. Metropolitan Vladimir died on 18 December 1959 in Paris.
