= St. Sergius Institute =

University in Paris

Coordinates: 48°53′02″N 2°23′04″E

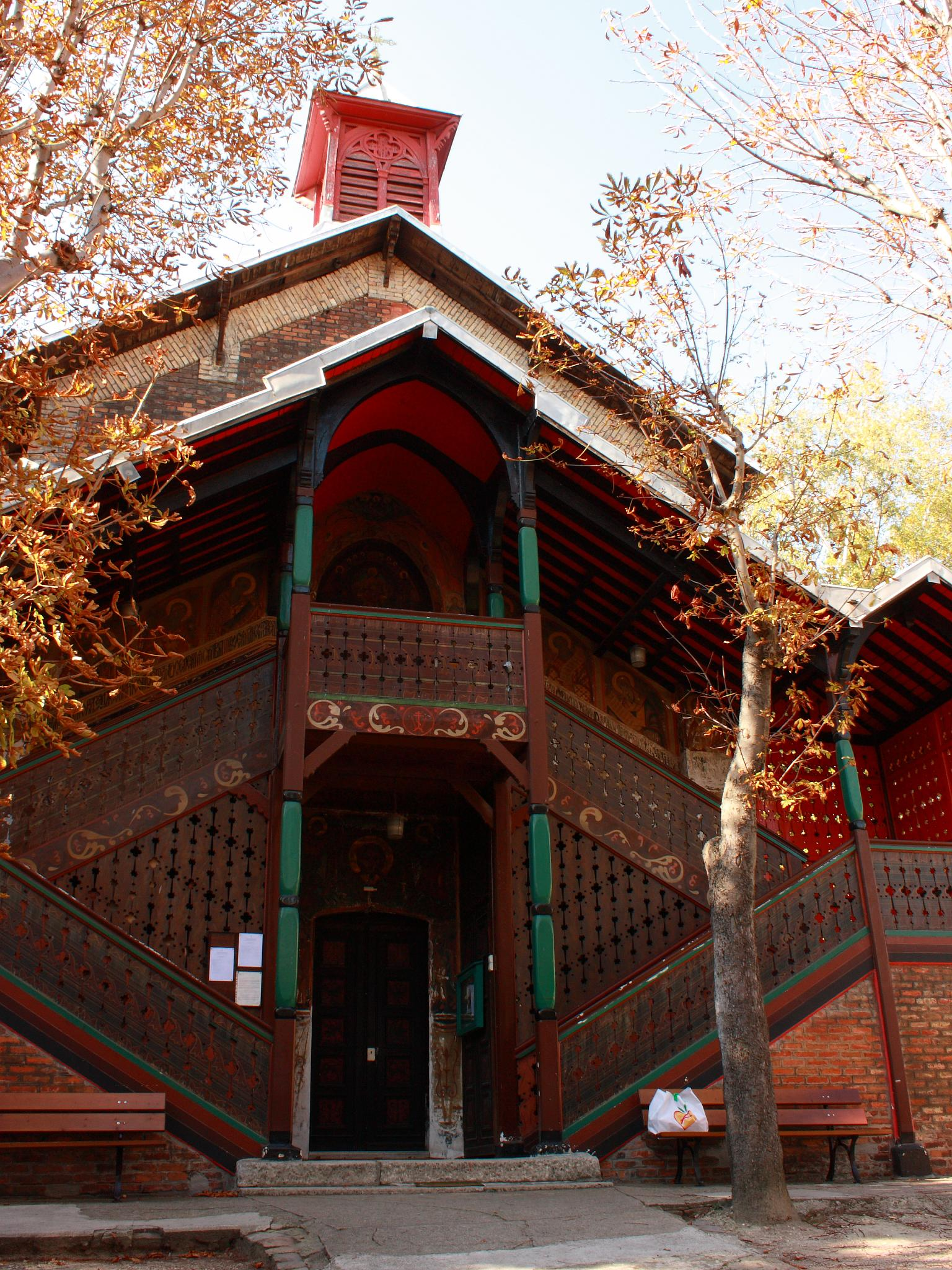
- The St. Sergius Institute in 2008
- Type: Private
- Established: 1925
- Affiliations: Institut supérieur d'études œcuméniques
- Religious affiliation: Eastern Orthodox
- Chancellor: Jean Renneteau
- Dean: Michel Stavrou
- Location: Paris, France
- Campus: 93, rue de Crimée Paris, France
- Website: saint-serge.net

The St. Sergius Orthodox Theological Institute (French: Institut de théologie orthodoxe Saint-Serge) in Paris, France, is a private university of higher education in Orthodox theology. Founded in 1925 by a group led by Metropolitan Eulogius Georgiyevsky, Anton Kartashev (historian, theologian, and last Minister of Religious Affairs of the Russian Provisional Government), Lev Liperovsky, and Mikhail Ossorguine, with the active support of Nobel Peace Prize recipient John Mott. It is under the canonical jurisdiction of the Archdiocese of Russian Orthodox churches in Western Europe under the omophorion of the Russian Orthodox Church.

The institute has been in conformity with French legislation and the norms of European university education since its earliest years and is accredited by the Académie de Paris to deliver bachelor, masters and doctoral degrees. The mission of the institute is to form educated priests and laypeople, intending them to serve actively the Orthodox Church and representing it in ecumenical dialogue as well as in the religious and cultural life of their own country. Its faculty and graduate students conduct scholarly activities that have become world famous — research, publications, organizing international conferences (including, since the 1950s, the annual "liturgical week") and interfaith dialog.

== History ==
The institute's building was originally a German Protestant church. Friedrich von Bodelschwingh bought the site to construct a church, a school and other facilities to help German workers in Paris.

The institute began its operations in 1925. The original faculty and their immediate successors included some of the most notable names in Russian intellectual history: economist, philosopher and theologian Sergei Bulgakov who became the dean; Anton Kartashev; Georgy Fedotov; Boris Vysheslavtsev; Archpriest Basil Zenkovsky; Archpriest Georges Florovsky, pioneer of Orthodox neopatristics and of the ecumenical movement; Archimandrite Cyprian Kern, patrologist and liturgist; Archpriest Nicolas Afanassieff, professor of canon law; New Testament scholar Bishop Cassian Bézobrazov; Léon Zander, another pioneer of the ecumenical movement; Alexander Schmemann; John Meyendorff; and diplomat Constantin Andronikof, personal interpreter for several French presidents and prolific translator of Russian-language theological classics.

== Education ==
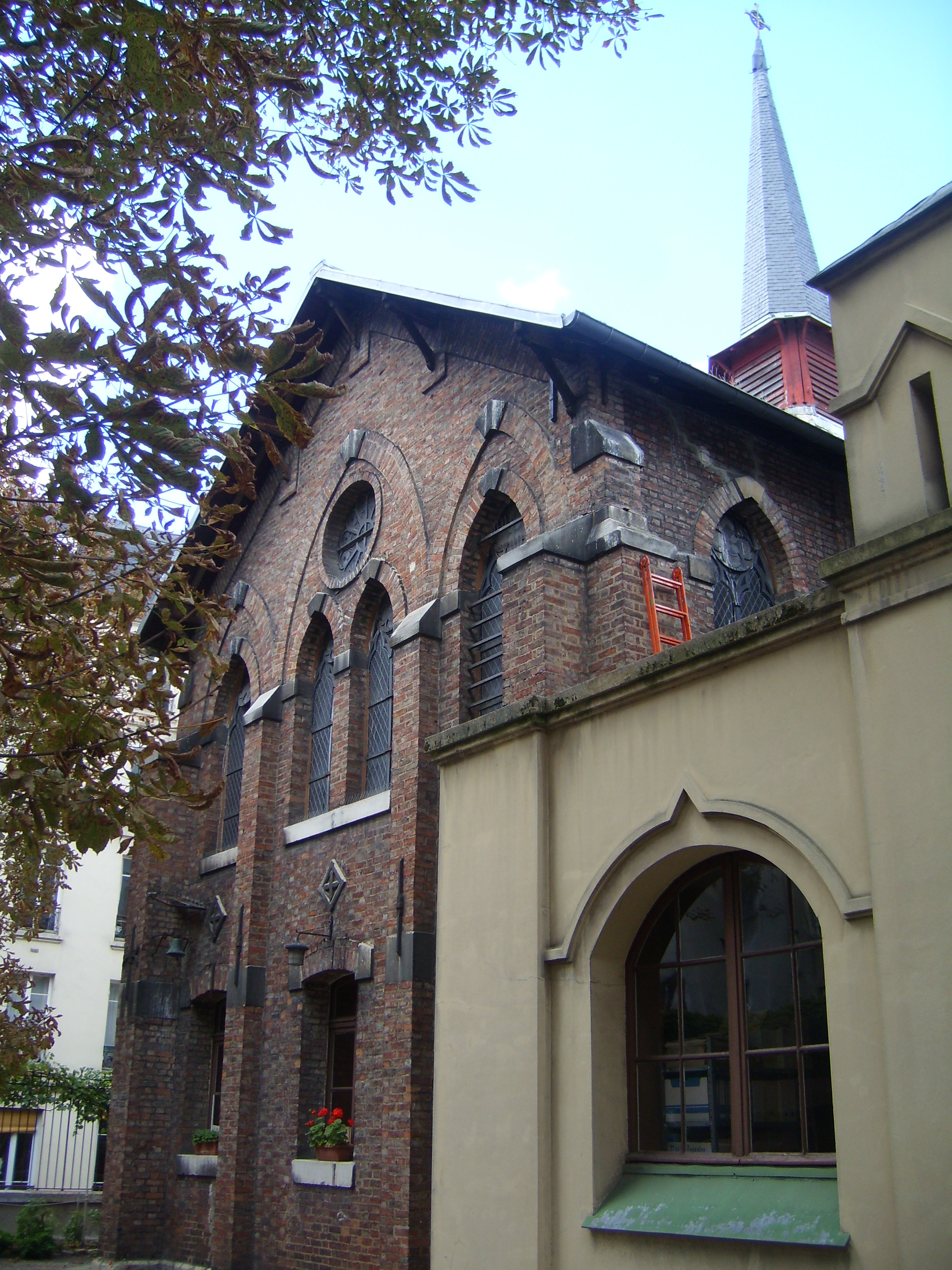
St. Sergius Institute in 2010

The St. Sergius Institute offers a program which includes licentiate, masters and doctoral degrees. It serves as a centre of theological education by correspondence. It is a centre of pastoral training, and provides teaching in the sacred arts, iconography and liturgical singing. The institute also serves as a laboratory for research in religious history and science.

The institute hosts a library which contains more than 35,000 books and rare journals. It is a place of meeting and colloquia, including the annual "Liturgical Week" sessions. Teaching is done in the French language.

== Notable alumni and professors ==
Alumni

- Ignatius IV (Hazim) - Greek Orthodox Patriarch of Antioch and All the East
- John Meyendorff
- Alexander Schmemann
- Hyacinthe Destivelle

Professors

- Nicholas Afanasiev
- Élisabeth Behr-Sigel
- Sergei Bulgakov
- Olivier Clément
- Sophie Deicha
- Paul Evdokimov
- Georges Florovsky
- Anton Kartashov
- John Meyendorff
- Alexander Schmemann
- Atanasije Jevtić

== See also ==
- Saint Vladimir's Orthodox Theological Seminary
