= Eulogius Georgiyevsky =

Eastern Orthodox bishop (1868–1946)

Yevlogy Georgiyevsky
- Metropolitan of Western Europe of the Russian Orthodox Church
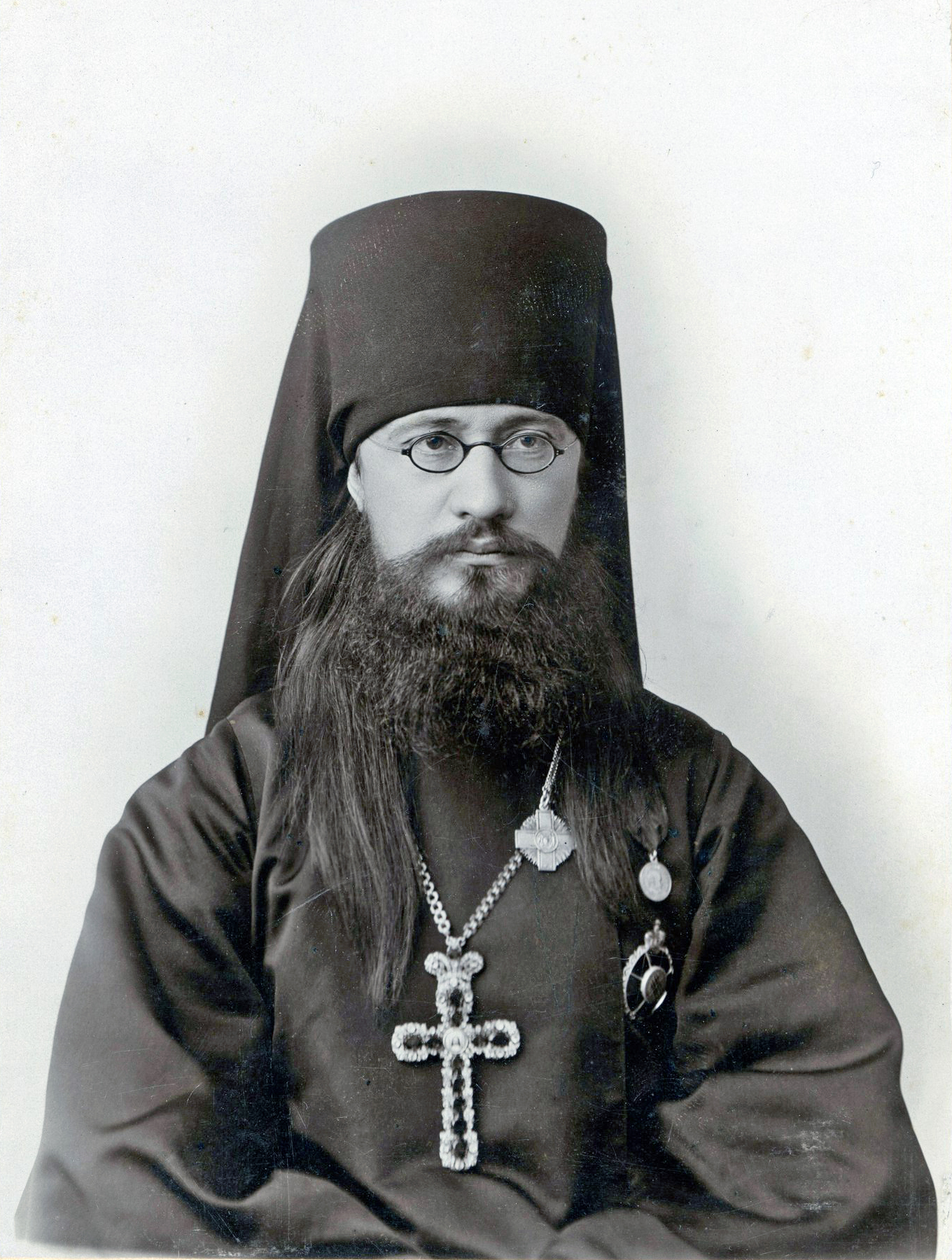
- Successor: Vladimir Tikhonicky

Personal details
- Born: 10 April 1868 Russia
- Died: 8 April 1946 (aged 77) Paris, France

Eulogius (Russian: Евло́гий, born Vasily Semyonovich Georgiyevsky, Russian: Васи́лий Семёнович Гео́ргиевский; 10 April 1868 – 8 April 1946 in Paris) was an Orthodox Christian bishop, who led elements of the Russian Orthodox diaspora in Western Europe from 1921 until his death. From 1931 he was head of the Patriarchal Exarchate for Orthodox Parishes of Russian Tradition in Western Europe. He was at various times archbishop and metropolitan bishop of the Moscow Patriarchate, the Russian Orthodox Church Outside Russia and the Ecumenical Patriarchate.

He served as metropolitan for two of the most influential Orthodox theologians of the twentieth century, Georges Florovsky and Sergius Bulgakov, which included serving as a mediator between them at several points.

== Biography ==
Vasili Semyonovitch Georgiyevskiy was born on 10 April 1868. He graduated from the Moscow Theological Academy in 1892.

In 1903 he was consecrated as a bishop of the Orthodox Church.

From 1907 to 1912 he was a member of the State Duma of the Russian Empire, representing the Orthodox population of the Lublin and Siedlce Governorates. In the Duma, he belonged to the Russian national fraction.

From 1912 to 1914 he was bishop of Kholm with the title of archbishop, and from 1914 to 1919 he was archbishop of Volhynia. During his tenure in Kholm Eulogius supported the education of locals in Ukrainian ("Little Russian) language as an attempt to oppose Polish cultural influences. In order to preserve the adherence of the local population, he even allowed the use of certain practices formerly used by the Uniates during processions and singing of prayers.

After the Russian Revolution of 1917 Russian Orthodox Christians based outside Russia or who fled there from the communist regime found themselves in a difficult situation; and in 1921 Eulogius was appointed by Tikhon, Patriarch of Moscow to head the ‘Provisional administration of the Russian parishes in Western Europe’.

During the early 1920s the majority of Russian Orthodox abroad, united by their opposition to the Soviet government, were members of the Russian Orthodox Church Outside Russia (ROCOR), in whose synod Eulogius sat. In 1927 Eulogius broke with the ROCOR (along with Metropolitan Platon (Rozhdestvensky) of New York, leader of the Russian Metropolia in America) and was subsequently condemned by them, splitting the Russian émigré community in western Europe.

In 1928 Metropolitan Sergius (Stragorodsky), then locum tenens of the Patriarchate of Moscow, demanded declarations of loyalty to the Soviet regime, a proposition which Eulogius initially supported but subsequently repudiated. In 1930, after taking part in a prayer service in London in supplication for Christians suffering under the Soviets, Eulogius was removed from office by Sergius and replaced. Most of Eulogius' parishes remained loyal to him, however, as they were generally against the Soviet government. Eulogius then petitioned Patriarch Photios II of Constantinople to be received under his canonical care by virtue of the canons of the Council of Chalcedon. He and his community were received in 1931, becoming an exarchate of the Ecumenical Patriarchate.

In 1945, shortly before his death, Eulogius led the exarchate in a return to the Moscow patriarchate. After Eulogius's death (8 April 1946), Metropolitan Seraphim (Lukyanov) of Western Europe was appointed the new exarch by the Moscow Patriarchate. A large number of parishes, opposed to Seraphim, once again entered the Patriarchate of Constantinople, forming the basis of the exarchate which continued to 2018.
