= History of Eastern Orthodox theology =

Eastern Orthodox Christian theology originated with the life of Jesus and the establishment the Christianity in the 1st century AD. Major events include the Chalcedonian schism of 451 with the Oriental Orthodox miaphysites, the Iconoclast controversy of the 8th and 9th centuries, the Photian schism (863-867), the Great Schism (culminating in 1054) between East and West, and the Hesychast controversy (c. 1337-1351). The period after the end of the Second World War in 1945 saw a re-engagement with the Greek, and more recently Syriac Fathers that included a rediscovery of the theological works of St. Gregory Palamas, which has resulted in a renewal of Orthodox theology in the 20th and 21st centuries.

== Tradition ==
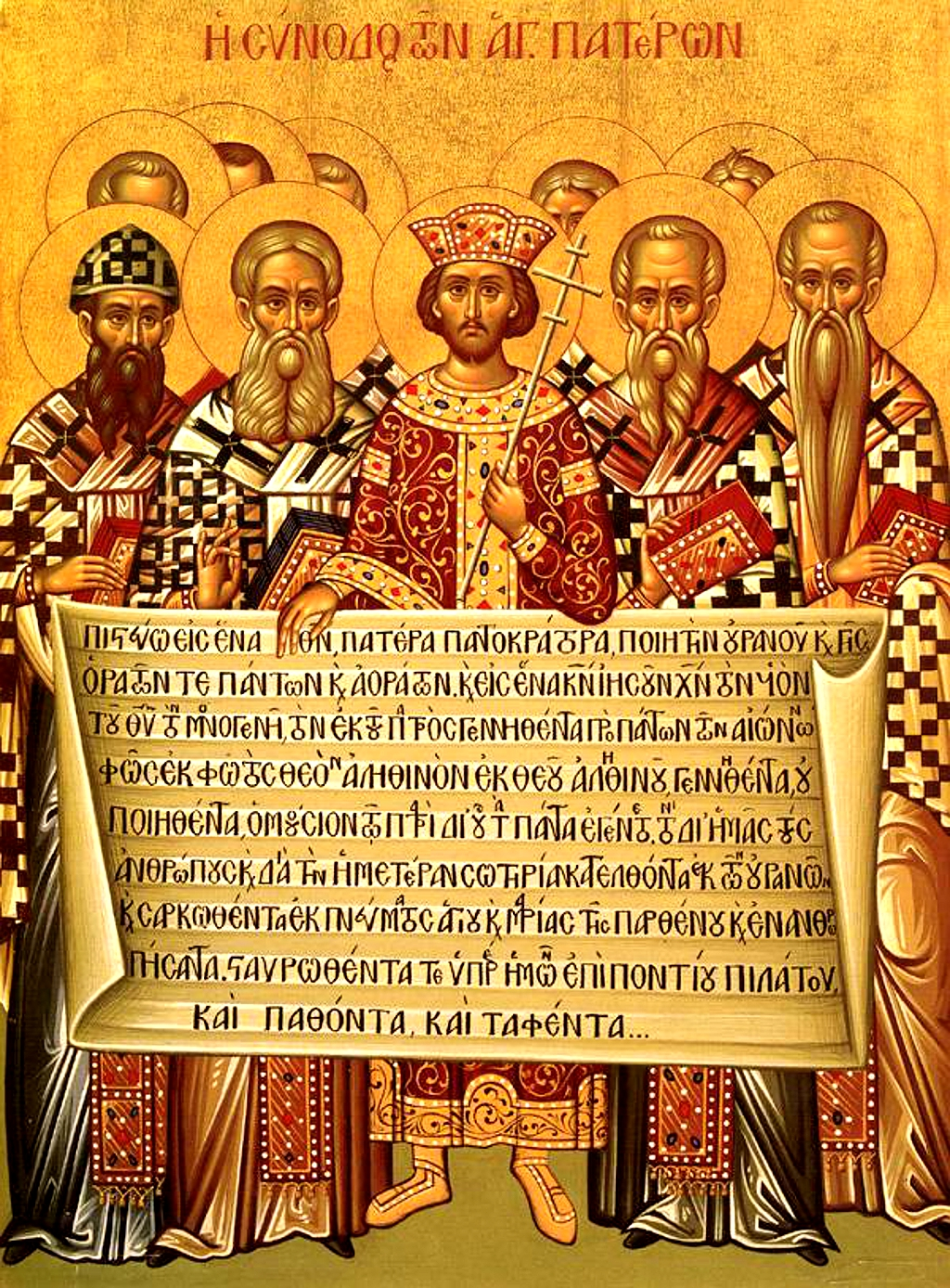
Icon depicting the Emperor Constantine (centre) and the bishops of the First Council of Nicaea (325) holding the Niceno–Constantinopolitan Creed of 381.

The Orthodox Church considers itself to be the original church started by Christ and his apostles. For the early years of the church, much of what was conveyed to its members was in the form of oral teachings. Within a very short period of time traditions were established to reinforce these teachings. The Orthodox Church asserts to have been very careful in preserving these traditions. When questions of belief or new concepts arise, the Church always refers back to the primitive faith. They see the Bible as a collection of inspired texts that sprang out of this tradition, not the other way around; and the choices made in forming the New Testament as having come from comparison with already firmly established faith. The Bible has come to be a very important part of "Tradition", but not the only part.

Likewise, the Orthodox Church has always recognized the gradual development in the complexity of the articulation of the Church's teachings. It does not, however, believe that truth changes and therefore always supports its previous beliefs all the way back to the direct teachings from the Apostles. The Church also understands that not everything is perfectly clear; therefore, it has always accepted a fair amount of contention about certain issues, arguments about certain points, as something that will always be present within the Church. It is this contention which, through time, clarifies the truth. The Church sees this as the action of the Holy Spirit on history to manifest truth to man.

The Church is unwavering in upholding its dogmatic teachings, but does not insist upon those matters of faith which have not been specifically defined. The Orthodox believe that there must always be room for mystery when speaking of God. Individuals are permitted to hold theologoumena (private theological opinions) so long as they do not contradict traditional Orthodox teaching. Sometimes, various Holy Fathers may have contradictory opinions about a certain question, and where no consensus exists, the individual is free to follow his conscience.

Tradition also includes the Nicene Creed, the decrees of the Seven Ecumenical Councils, the writings the Church Fathers, as well as Orthodox laws (canons), liturgical books and icons, etc. In defense of the extra-biblical tradition, the Orthodox Church quotes Paul: "Therefore, brethren, stand fast, and hold the traditions which ye have been taught, whether by our spoken word, or by our epistle." (2 Thessalonians 2:15). The Orthodox Church also believes that the Holy Spirit works through history to manifest truth to the Church, and that He weeds out falsehood in order that the Truth may be recognised more fully.

Eastern Orthodox Church

== Consensus of the Fathers ==
Orthodoxy interprets truth based on three witnesses: the consensus of the Holy Fathers of the Church; the ongoing teaching of the Holy Spirit guiding the life of the Church through the nous, or mind of the Church (also called the "Catholic Consciousness of the Church"), which is believed to be the Mind of Christ (1 Corinthians 2:16); and the praxis of the church (including among other things asceticism, liturgy, hymnography and iconography).

The consensus of the Church over time defines its catholicity—that which is believed at all times by the entire Church. Those who disagree with that consensus are not accepted as authentic "Fathers." All theological concepts must be in agreement with that consensus. Even those considered to be authentic "Fathers" may have some theological opinions that are not universally shared, but are not thereby considered heretical. Some Holy Fathers have even made statements that were later defined as heretical, but their mistakes do not exclude them from position of authority (heresy is a sin of pride; unintended error does not make one a heretic, only the refusal to accept a dogma which has been defined by the church). Thus an Orthodox Christian is not bound to agree with every opinion of every Father, but rather with the consensus of the Fathers, and then only on those matters about which the church is dogmatic.

Some of the greatest theologians in the history of the church come from the fourth century, including the Cappadocian Fathers and the Three Hierarchs. However, the Orthodox do not consider the "Patristic era" to be a thing of the past, but that it continues in an unbroken succession of enlightened teachers (i.e., the saints, especially those who have left us theological writings) from the Apostles to the present day.

== Apostolic era ==
Christianity first spread in the predominantly Greek-speaking eastern half of the Roman Empire. The Apostles traveled extensively throughout the Empire, establishing communities in major cities and regions, see Early centers of Christianity, with the first community appearing in Jerusalem, and then Antioch, Alexandria and others, and then the two political centers of Rome and Greece and then later Byzantium which became Constantinople. Orthodoxy believes in the apostolic succession that was established by the Apostles in the New Testament; this played a key role in the communities' view of itself as the preserver of the original Christian tradition. Originally, the word "church" did not mean a building (which would be a "basilica"), but a community or gathering of like-minded people (an "ekklesia").

The earliest forms of Christianity were Greek as contemporary ecclesiastical historian Henry Hart Milman writes: "For some considerable (it cannot but be an undefinable) part of three first centuries, the Church of Rome, and most, if not all the Churches of the West, were, if we may so speak, Greek religious colonies. Their language was Greek, their organization Greek, their writers Greek, their scriptures Greek; and many vestiges and traditions show that their ritual, their Liturgy, was Greek."

The original church or community of the East before the schisms, is the Greek communities founded by Saint Paul and the Antiochian, Asia Minor (Byzantine) churches founded by Saint Peter, the Coptic (or Egyptian) churches founded by Saint Mark (including the Ethiopian of Africa or Abyssinia), the Syrian (or Assyrian), along with the Georgian and Russian churches founded by Saint Andrew. By tradition, the Armenian church, as well as the churches of Samaria and Judea were founded by Saint Jude and Saint Bartholomew, while the church of Israel was founded by Saint James.

== Patristic era ==
=== Biblical Canon ===
The Biblical canon began with the officially accepted books of the Koine Greek Old Testament (which predates Christianity). This canon is called the Septuagint or seventy and is accepted as the foundation of the Christian faith along with the Good news (gospels), Revelations and Letters of the Apostles (including Acts of the Apostles and the Epistle to the Hebrews). The earliest text of the New Testament was written in common or Koine Greek, according to Greek primacy. The many texts in the many tribal dialects of the Old Testament were all translated into a single language, Koine Greek, in the time of Ptolemy II Philadelphus in 200 BC.

The early Christians had no way to have a copy of the works that later became the canon and other church works accepted but not canonized (see Church Fathers and Patristics). Much of the original church liturgical services functioned as a means of learning these works. Orthodox Church services today continue to serve this educational function. The issue of collecting the various works of the eastern churches and compiling them into a canon, each being confirmed as authentic text was a long protracted process. Much of this process was motivated by a need to address various heresies. In many instances, heretical groups had themselves begun compiling and disseminating text that they used to validate their positions, positions that were not consistent with the text, history and traditions of the Orthodox faith.

Much of the official organizing of the ecclesiastical structure, clarifying true from false teachings was done by the bishops of the church. Their works are referred to as Patristics. This tradition of clarification can be seen as established in the saints of the Orthodox church referred to as the Apostolic Fathers, bishops themselves established by apostolic succession. This also continued into the age when the practice of the religion of Christianity became legal (see the Ecumenical Councils).

Unlike Protestantism which posits the Bible as either the sole or the primary infallible authority, Orthodoxy believes the Bible is a part of Sacred Tradition, representing those texts approved by the Church for the purpose of conveying the most important parts of what it already believed. The oldest list of books for the canon is the Muratorian fragment dating to ca. 170 (see also Chester Beatty Papyri). The oldest complete canon of the Christian Bible was found at Saint Catherine's Monastery (see Codex Sinaiticus) and later sold to the British by the Soviets in 1933. These texts (as a whole) were not universally considered canonical until the church reviewed, edited, accepted and ratified them in 368 (also see the Council of Laodicea). Salvation or soteriology from the Orthodox perspective is achieved not by mere knowledge of scripture but by cultivating phronema and theosis through participation in the life of the Church.

== The Eastern Monastic or Ascetic tradition ==
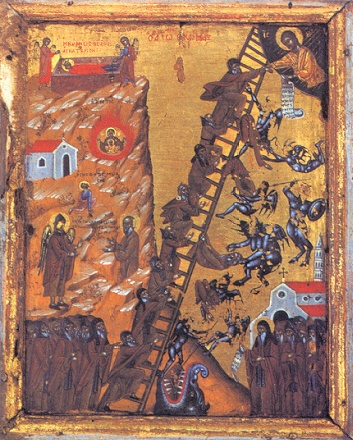
Icon Depicting Souls Ascent to Heaven

Christian monasticism started in Egypt. The first monks lived in cities and villages, but only received great renown as they left for the wilderness and became hermits (eremitic monks). By the end of the early Christian era, Saint Pachomius was organizing his followers into a community and founding the tradition of monasticism in community (cenobitic monks).

With the elevation of Christianity to the status of a legal religion within the Roman Empire by Constantine the Great, with the edict of Milan (313), many Orthodox felt a new decline in the ethical life of Christians. In reaction to this decline, many refused to accept any compromises and fled the world or societies of mankind, to become monastics. Monasticism thrived, especially in Egypt, with two important monastic centers, one in the desert of Wadi Natroun, by the Western Bank of the Nile, with Abba Ammoun (d. 356) as its founder, and one called Scetis in the desert of Skete, south of Nitria, with Saint Makarios of Egypt (d. ca. Egypt 330) as its founder. These monks were anchorites, following the monastic ideal of St. Anthony the Great, Paul of Thebes and Saint Pachomius. They lived by themselves, gathering together for common worship on Saturdays and Sundays only. This is not to say that Monasticism or Orthodox Asceticism was created whole cloth at the time of legalization but rather at the time it blossomed into a mass movement. Charismatics, as the ascetic movement was considered, had no clerical status as such. Later history developed around the Greek (Mount Athos) and Syrian (Cappadocia) forms of monastic life, along with the formation of Monastic Orders or monastic organization. The three main forms of Ascetics' traditions being Skete, Cenobite and Hermit respectively.

== Ecumenical councils ==
Several doctrinal disputes from the 4th century onwards led to the calling of ecumenical councils which from a traditional perspective, are the culmination and also a continuation of previous church synods. These pre-ecumenical councils include the Council of Jerusalem c. 50, Council of Rome (155), Second Council of Rome 193, Council of Ephesus (193), Council of Carthage (251), Council of Iconium 258, Council of Antioch (264), Councils of Arabia 246–247, Council of Elvira 306, Council of Carthage (311), Synod of Neo-Caesarea c.314 Council of Ancyra 314, Council of Arles (314). The first ecumenical council in part was a continuation of Trinitarian doctrinal issues addressed in pre-legalization of Christianity councils or synods (for examples see Synods of Antioch between 264–26 and Synod of Elvira). These ecumenical councils with their doctrinal formulations are pivotal in the history of Christianity in general and to the history of the Orthodox Church in particular. Specifically, these assemblies were responsible for the formulation of Christian doctrine. As such, they constitute a permanent standard for an Orthodox understanding of the Trinity, the person or hypostasis of Christ, the incarnation.

The tradition of councils within the church started with the apostolic council of Jerusalem, but this council is not numbered as an ecumenical council. It was convened to address the Abrahamic tradition of circumcision and its relation to converted Gentiles (Acts 15). Its decisions are accepted by all Christians, and later definitions of an ecumenical council to conform to this sole Biblical council.

The First seven Ecumenical Councils were held between 325 (the First Council of Nicaea) and 787 (the Second Council of Nicaea), which the Orthodox recognize as the definitive interpretation of Christian dogma.

1. The first of the Seven Ecumenical Councils was that convoked by the Roman Emperor Constantine at Nicaea in 325, condemning the view of Arius that the Son is a created being inferior to the Father.
2. The Second Ecumenical Council was held at Constantinople in 381, defining the nature of the Holy Spirit against those asserting His inequality with the other persons of the Trinity. Under Theodosius I this council marks the end of the Arian conflict in the Eastern Roman Empire..
3. The Third Ecumenical Council is that of Ephesus in 431, which affirmed that Mary is truly "Birth giver" or "Mother" of God (Theotokos), contrary to the teachings of Nestorius.
4. The Fourth Ecumenical Council is that of Chalcedon in 451, which affirmed that Jesus is truly God and truly man, without mixture of the two natures, contrary to Monophysite teaching.
5. The Fifth Ecumenical Council is the second of Constantinople in 553, interpreting the decrees of Chalcedon and further explaining the relationship of the two natures of Jesus; it also condemned the teachings of Origen on the pre-existence of the soul, and Apocatastasis, etc.
6. The Sixth Ecumenical Council is the third of Constantinople in 681; it declared that Christ has two wills of his two natures, human and divine, contrary to the teachings of the Monothelites.
7. The Seventh Ecumenical Council was called under the Empress Regnant Irene in 787, known as the second of Nicea. It affirmed the making and veneration of icons, while also forbidding the worship of icons and the making of three-dimensional statuary. It reversed the declaration of an earlier council that had called itself the Seventh Ecumenical Council and also nullified its status (see separate article on Iconoclasm). That earlier council had been held under the iconoclast Emperor Constantine V. It met with more than 330 bishops at Constantinople and Hieria in 754, although the Pentarchy had no participation in it. It declared the making of icons of Jesus or the saints an error.

The Orthodox Church also universally accepts the theological decrees of both the Fourth Council of Constantinople and the Fifth Council of Constantinople, and recognizes them as universally binding. Their teachings are dogma in the Orthodox Church. Orthodox thinking differs on whether these two Councils can be called Ecumenical Councils. However, the apparent disagreement is mainly semantic and whether one should put them in the list of the Ecumenical Councils rather than to question their authority and dogmatic teachings.

=== Confronting Arianism ===
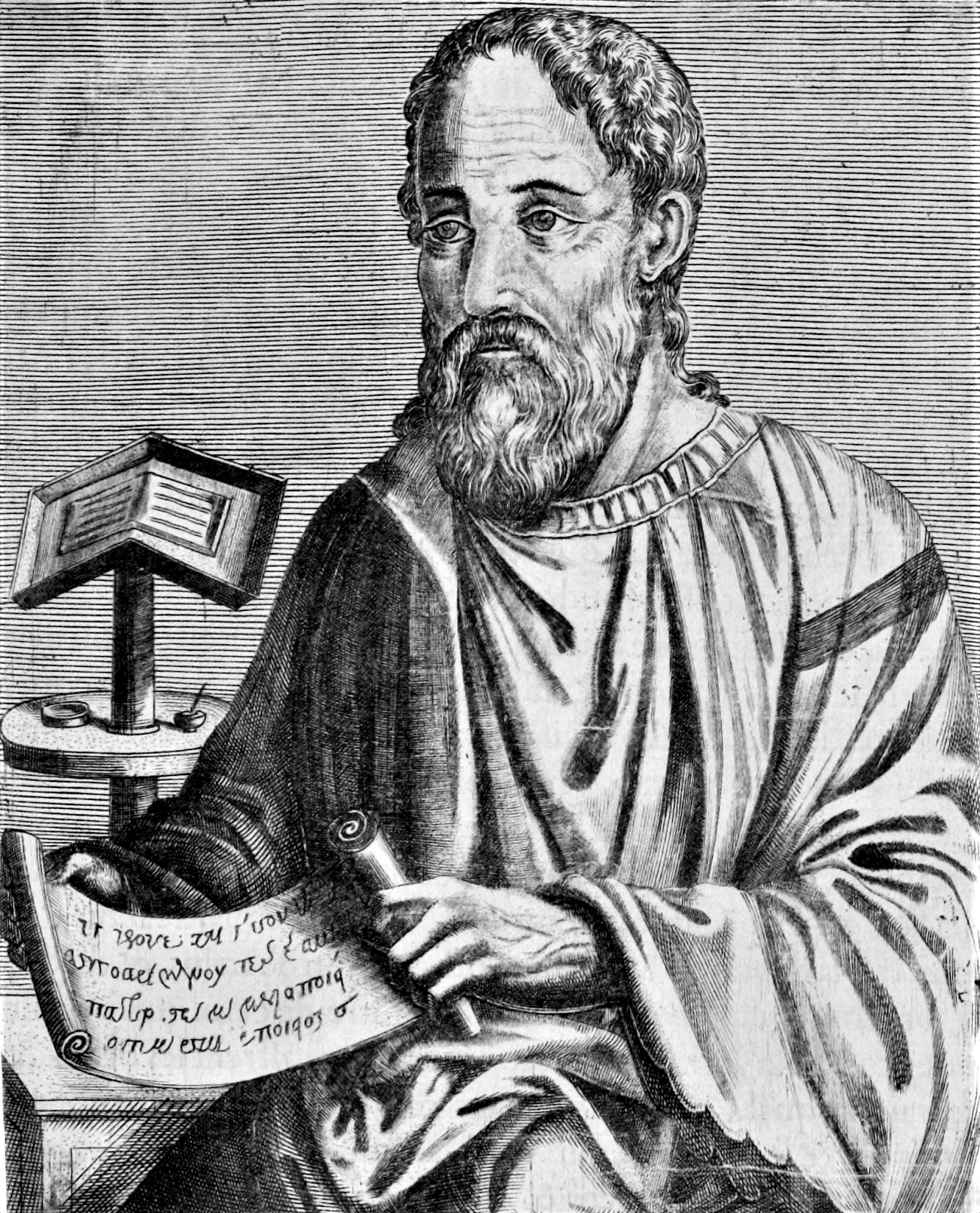
Eusebius of Caesarea

The first ecumenical council was convened to address again the divinity of Christ (see Paul of Samosata and the Synods of Antioch) but this time through the teachings of Arius, an Egyptian presbyter from Alexandria. Arius taught that Jesus Christ was divine but created, both sides likened Jesus to the Angel of the Lord. Arius taught that Jesus was sent to earth for the salvation of mankind but was not uncreated and not God in essence. It was this teaching, that Jesus Christ was not God in Essence (the uncreated logos) from the Father (infinite, primordial origin) and uncreated just as the Holy Spirit (giver of life), that came to be known as Arianism. Under Arianism, Christ was instead not consubstantial with God the Father. Since both the Father and the Son under Arius where of "like" essence or being (see homoiousia) but not of the same essence or being (see homoousia). Much of the distinction between the differing factions was over the kenotic phrasing that Christ expressed in the New Testament to express submission to God the Father. This Ecumenical council declared that Jesus Christ was a distinct being of God in existence or reality (hypostasis). Hypostasis was translated as persona by the Latin fathers. Jesus was God in essence, being and or nature (ousia). Ousia was translated as substantia by the Latin fathers.

The first council did not end the conflict, for when Emperor Constantine I was baptized, the baptism was performed by an Arian bishop and relative, Eusebius of Nicomedia. Also the charges of Christian corruption by Constantine (see the Constantinian shift) ignore the fact that Constantine deposed Athanasius of Alexandria and later restored Arius, who had been branded a heresiarch by the Nicene Council.

Constantine I after his death was succeeded by two Arian Emperors Constantius II (son of Constantine I) and Valens. The Eastern Empire also saw its last Pagan Emperor in Julian the Apostate after the death of Constantine I. Even after Constantine I, in the Eastern Mediterranean and Middle East Christians remained persecuted. Though to a much lesser degree than when Christianity was an illegal community (see Persecution of early Christians by the Romans, Shapur II and Basil of Ancyra). Constantine I by making Christianity legal, did not make Christianity the official religion of the Empire. It was not until Emperor Gratian (West) and Spaniard Emperor Theodosius I (East), as Orthodox Emperors both East and West, that Christianity was made so. It was not until the co-reigns of Gratian and Theodosius that Arianism was effectively wiped out among the ruling class and elite of the Eastern Empire. Theodosius' wife St Flacilla was instrumental in his campaign to end Arianism. This later culminated into the killing of some 300,000 Orthodox Christians at the hands of Arians in Milan in 538.

=== Oriental Orthodoxy ===
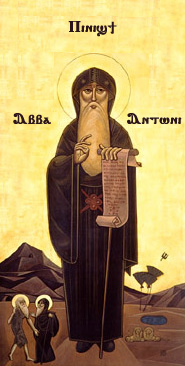
Coptic icon of St. Anthony the Great

The schism between the Oriental Orthodox and the rest of Christendom occurred in the 5th century. The separation resulted in part from the refusal of Pope Dioscorus, the Patriarch of Alexandria, and the other 13 Egyptian Bishops, to accept the Christological dogmas promulgated by the Council of Chalcedon, which held that Jesus is in two natures: one divine and one human. They would accept only "of or from two natures" but not "in two natures." To the hierarchs who would lead the Oriental Orthodox, the latter phrase was tantamount to accepting Nestorianism, which expressed itself in a terminology incompatible with their understanding of Christology. Founded in the Alexandrine School of Theology it advocated a formula ("one nature of the Incarnate Word of God") stressing the unity of the Incarnation over all other considerations.

The Oriental Orthodox churches were therefore often called Monophysite, although they reject this label, as it is associated with Eutychian Monophysitism; they prefer the term "Miaphysite" churches. Oriental Orthodox Churches reject what they consider to be the heretical Monophysite teachings of Apollinaris of Laodicea and Eutyches, the Dyophysite definition of the Council of Chalcedon, and the Antiochene Christology of Theodore of Mopsuestia, Nestorius of Constantinople, Theodoret of Cyrus, and Ibas of Edessa.

Christology, although important, was not the only reason for the Alexandrian Church's refusal to accept the declarations of the Council of Chalcedon; political, ecclesiastical and imperial issues were hotly debated during that period.

In the years following Chalcedon the patriarchs of Constantinople intermittently remained in communion with the non-Chalcedonian patriarchs of Alexandria, Antioch, Jerusalem, (see Henotikon) while Rome remained out of communion with the latter and in unstable communion with Constantinople. It was not until 518 that the new Byzantine Emperor, Justin I (who accepted Chalcedon), demanded that the Church in the Roman Empire accept the Council's decisions. Justin ordered the replacement of all non-Chalcedonian bishops, including the patriarchs of Antioch and Alexandria. The extent of the influence of the Bishop of Rome in this demand has been a matter of debate. Justinian I also attempted to bring those monks who still rejected the decision of the Council of Chalcedon into communion with the greater church. The exact time of this event is unknown, but it is believed to have been between 535 and 548. St Abraham of Farshut was summoned to Constantinople and he chose to bring with him four monks. Upon arrival, Justinian summoned them and informed them that they would either accept the decision of the Council or lose their positions. Abraham refused to entertain the idea. Theodora tried to persuade Justinian to change his mind, seemingly to no avail. Abraham himself stated in a letter to his monks that he preferred to remain in exile rather than subscribe to a faith contrary to that of Athanasius.

The Church of Caucasian Albania existed as an autocephalous Oriental Orthodox church from 313 to 705. Located in Caucasian Albania in what is now Azerbaijan, the church was absorbed by the Armenian Apostolic Church following the Muslim conquest of the region.

By the 20th century the Chalcedonian schism was not seen with the same importance, and from several meetings between the authorities of the Holy See and the Oriental Orthodoxy, reconciling declarations emerged in the common statement of the Syriac Patriarch (Mar Ignatius Zakka I Iwas) and the Pope (John Paul II) in 1984.

The confusions and schisms that occurred between their Churches in the later centuries, they realize today, in no way affect or touch the substance of their faith, since these arose only because of differences in terminology and culture and in the various formulae adopted by different theological schools to express the same matter. Accordingly, we find today no real basis for the sad divisions and schisms that subsequently arose between us concerning the doctrine of Incarnation. In words and life we confess the true doctrine concerning Christ our Lord, notwithstanding the differences in interpretation of such a doctrine which arose at the time of the Council of Chalcedon.

According to the canons of the Oriental Orthodox Churches, the four bishops of Rome, Alexandria, Ephesus (later transferred to Constantinople) and Antioch were all given status as Patriarchs; in other words, the ancient apostolic centres of Christianity, by the First Council of Nicaea (predating the schism) — each of the four patriarchs was responsible for those bishops and churches within his own area of the Universal Church, (with the exception of the Patriarch of Jerusalem, who was independent of the rest). Thus, the Bishop of Rome has always been held by the others to be fully sovereign within his own area, as well as "First-Among-Equals", due to the traditional belief that the Apostles Saint Peter and Saint Paul were martyred in Rome.

The technical reason for the schism was that the bishops of Rome and Constantinople excommunicated the non-Chalcedonian bishops in 451 for refusing to accept the "in two natures" teaching, thus declaring them to be out of communion. Recent declarations indicate that the Holy See now regards itself as being in a state of partial communion with the other patriarchates.

== Iconoclasm ==
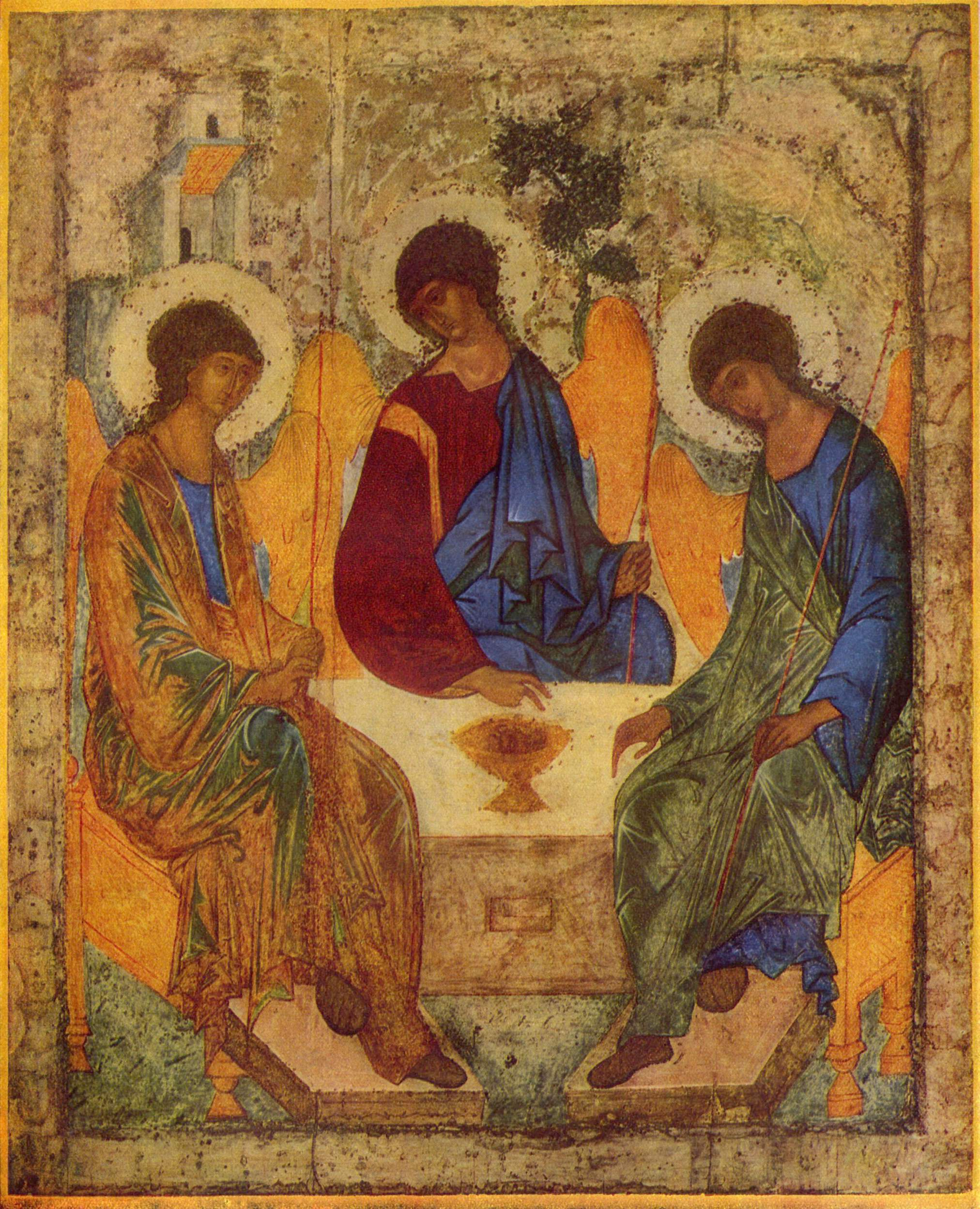
Andrei Rublev's Trinity

Resolved under the Seventh Ecumenical Council, Iconoclasm was a movement within the Eastern Christian Byzantine church to establish that the Christian culture of portraits (see icon) of the family of Christ and subsequent Christians and biblical scenes were not of a Christian origin and therefore heretical. There were two periods of Iconoclasm 730-787 and 813-843. This movement itself was later defined as heretical under the Seventh Ecumenical council. The group destroyed much of the Christian churches' art history, which is needed in addressing the traditional interruptions of the Christian faith and the artistic works that in the early church were devoted to Jesus Christ or God. Many Glorious works were destroyed during this period. Two prototypes of icons would be the Christ Pantocrator and the Icon of the Hodegetria. In the West the tradition of icons have been seen as the veneration of "graven images" or against "no graven images." From the Orthodox point of view graven then would be engraved or carved. Thus this restriction would include many of the ornaments that Moses was commanded to create in the passages right after the commandment was given, i.e., the carving of cherubim. The commandment as understood by such out of context interpretation would mean "no carved images". This would include the cross and other holy artifacts. The commandment in the East is understand that the people of God are not to create idols and then worship them. It is "right worship" to worship which is of God, which is Holy and that alone.

== Tensions between the East and the West ==
The cracks and fissures in Christian unity which led to the East–West Schism started to become evident as early as the 4th century. Although 1054 is the date usually given for the beginning of the Great Schism, there is, in fact, no specific date on which the schism occurred. What really happened was a complex chain of events whose climax culminated with the sacking of Constantinople by the Fourth Crusade in 1204 .

The events leading to schism were not exclusively theological in nature. Cultural, political, and linguistic differences were often mixed with the theological. Any narrative of the schism which emphasizes one at the expense of the other will be fragmentary. Unlike the Coptics or Armenians who broke from the Church in the 5th century and established ethnic churches at the cost of their universality and catholicity, the eastern and western parts of the Church remained loyal to the faith and authority of the seven ecumenical councils. They were united, by virtue of their common faith and tradition, in one Church.

Nonetheless, the transfer of the Roman capital to Constantinople inevitably brought mistrust, rivalry, and even jealousy to the relations of the two great sees, Rome and Constantinople. It was easy for Rome to be jealous of Constantinople at a time when it was rapidly losing its political prominence. In fact, Rome refused to recognize the conciliar legislation which promoted Constantinople to second rank. But the estrangement was also helped along by the German invasions in the West, which effectively weakened contacts. The rise of Islam with its conquest of most of the Mediterranean coastline (not to mention the arrival of the pagan Slavs in the Balkans at the same time) further intensified this separation by driving a physical wedge between the two worlds. The once homogeneous unified world of the Mediterranean was fast vanishing. Communication between the Greek East and Latin West by the 7th century had become dangerous and practically ceased.

Two basic problems—the primacy of the bishop of Rome and the procession of the Holy Spirit—were involved. These doctrinal novelties were first openly discussed during the patriarchate of Photius I.

By the 5th century, Christendom was divided into a pentarchy of five sees with Rome holding the primacy. This was determined by canonical decision and did not entail hegemony of any one local church or patriarchate over the others. However, Rome began to interpret her primacy in terms of sovereignty, as a God-given right involving universal jurisdiction in the Church. The collegial and conciliar nature of the Church, in effect, was gradually abandoned in favor of a supremacy of unlimited papal power over the entire Church. These ideas were finally given systematic expression in the West during the Gregorian Reform movement of the 11th century. The Eastern churches viewed Rome's understanding of the nature of episcopal power as being in direct opposition to the Church's essentially conciliar structure and thus saw the two ecclesiologies as mutually antithetical.

This fundamental difference in ecclesiology would cause all attempts to heal the schism and bridge the divisions to fail. Rome bases her claims to "true and proper jurisdiction" (as the Vatican Council of 1870 put it) on St. Peter. This "Roman" exegesis of Mathew 16:18, however, has been unacceptable for the Orthodox Church. For them, specifically, St. Peter's primacy could never be the exclusive prerogative of any one bishop. All bishops must, like St. Peter, confess Jesus as the Christ and, as such, all are St. Peter's successors. The churches of the East gave the Roman See, primacy but not supremacy. The Pope being the first among equals, but not infallible and not with absolute authority.

The other major irritant to Orthodoxy was the Western interpretation of the procession of the Holy Spirit. Like the primacy, this too developed gradually and entered the Creed in the West almost unnoticed. This theologically complex issue involved the addition by the West of the Latin phrase filioque ("and from the Son") to the Creed. The original Creed sanctioned by the councils and still used today by the Orthodox Church did not contain this phrase; the text simply states "the Holy Spirit, the Lord and Giver of Life, who proceeds from the Father." Theologically, the Latin interpolation was unacceptable to Orthodoxy since it implied that the Spirit now had two sources of origin and procession, the Father and the Son, rather than the Father alone. In short, the balance between the three persons of the Trinity was altered and the understanding of the Trinity and God confused. The result, the Orthodox Church believed, then and now, was theologically indefensible. But in addition to the dogmatic issue raised by the filioque, the Byzantines argued that the phrase had been added unilaterally and, therefore, illegitimately, since the East had never been consulted.

In the final analysis, only another ecumenical council could introduce such an alteration. Indeed, the councils, which drew up the original Creed, had expressly forbidden any subtraction or addition to the text.

=== The Filioque controversy ===
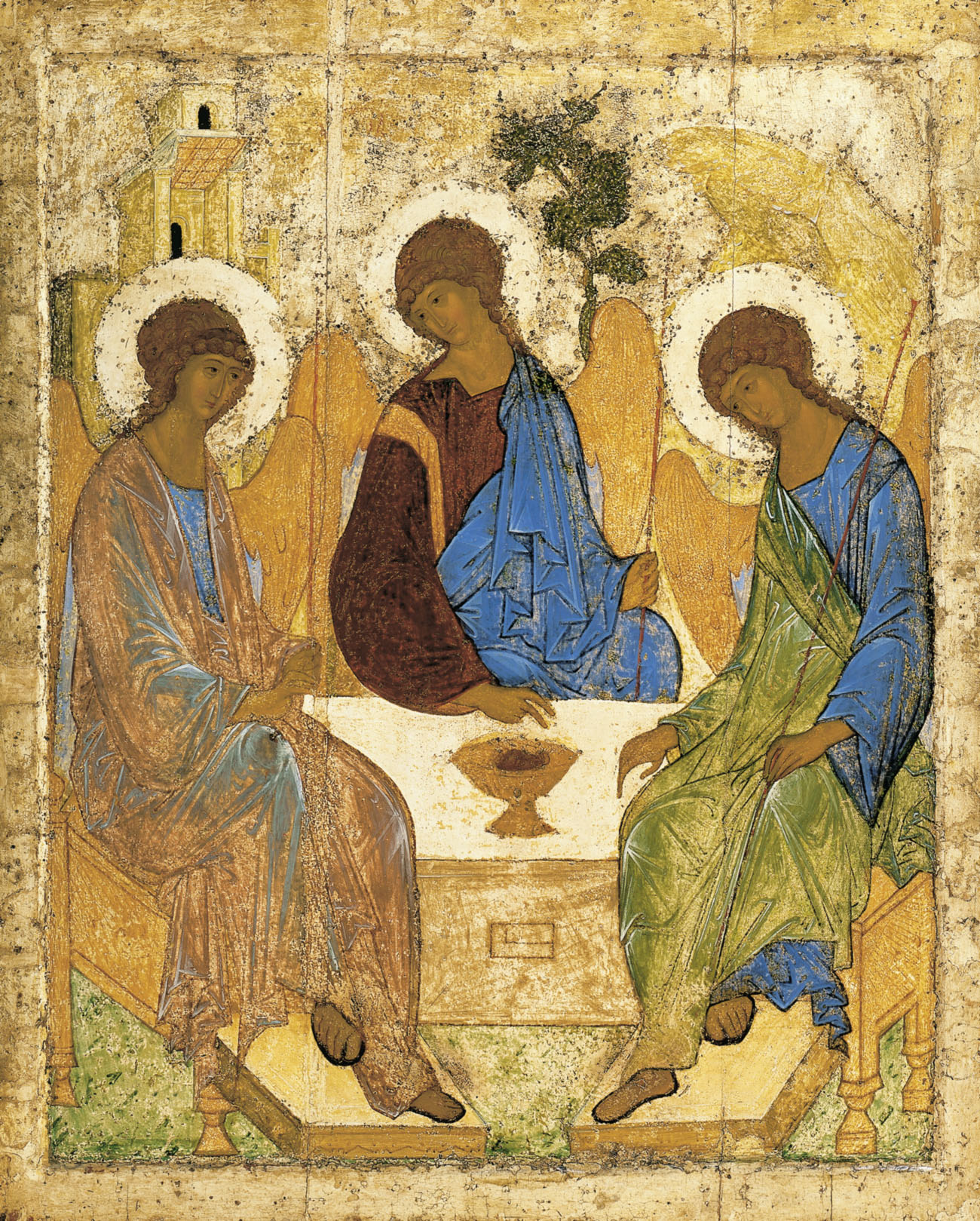
Icon by Andrei Rublev depicting the Holy Trinity.

The phrase Filioque, Latin for "and the Son", was added in 589 to the Catholic Church's Nicene Creed. This creed, foundational to Christian belief since the 4th century, defines the three persons of the Trinity: the Father, the Son, and the Holy Spirit. In its original Greek form, the creed says that the Holy Spirit proceeds "from the Father". The Latin text speaks of the Holy Spirit as proceeding "from the Father and the Son".

Et in Spiritum Sanctum, Dominum, et vivificantem: qui ex Patre Filioque procedit.
(And in the Holy Spirit, the Lord, and giver of life, who from the Father and the Son proceeds.)

The word Filioque was first added to the Creed at the Third Council of Toledo (589) and its inclusion spread later throughout the Frankish Empire. In the 9th century, Pope Leo III, while accepting, like his predecessor Pope Leo I, the doctrine, tried to suppress the singing of the Filioque in the Mass of the Roman rite. In 1014, however, inclusion of Filioque in the Creed was adopted in Rome. Since its denunciation by Photios I of Constantinople, it has been an ongoing source of conflict between the East and West, contributing to the East–West Schism of 1054 and proving an obstacle to attempts to reunify the two sides.

=== Photian schism ===
In the 9th-century, a controversy arose between Eastern (Byzantine, later Orthodox) and Western (Latin, Roman Catholic) Christianity that was precipitated by the opposition of the Roman Pope John VII to the appointment by the Byzantine Emperor Michael III of Photius I to the position of patriarch of Constantinople. Photios was refused an apology by the pope for previous points of dispute between the East and West. Photius refused to accept the supremacy of the pope in Eastern matters or accept the filioque clause, which the Latin delegation at his council of his consecration pressed him to accept in order to secure their support.

The controversy also involved Eastern and Western ecclesiastical jurisdictional rights in the Bulgarian church, as well as a doctrinal dispute over the Filioque ("and from the Son") clause. That had been added to the Nicene Creed by the Latin church, which was later the theological breaking point in the ultimate Great East–West Schism in the 11th century.

Photius did provide concession on the issue of jurisdictional rights concerning Bulgaria and the papal legates made do with his return of Bulgaria to Rome. This concession, however, was purely nominal, as Bulgaria's return to the Byzantine rite in 870 had already secured for it an autocephalous church. Without the consent of Boris I of Bulgaria, the papacy was unable to enforce any its claims.

=== The East–West Schism ===
In the 11th century the East–West Schism took place between Rome and Constantinople, which led to separation of the Church of the West, the Roman Catholic Church, and the Orthodox Church. There were doctrinal issues like the filioque clause and the authority of the Pope involved in the split, but these were exacerbated by cultural and linguistic differences between Latins and Greeks. Prior to that, the Eastern and Western halves of the Church had frequently been in conflict, particularly during the periods of iconoclasm and the Photian schism. The Orthodox East perceived the papacy as taking on monarch-type characteristics that were not inline with the Church's historical tradition as can be seen in the words of Archbishop Nicetas of Nicomedia of the 12th century:

My dearest brother, we do not deny to the Roman Church the primacy among the five sister patriachates and we recognize her right to the most honorable seat at the Ecumenical Council. But she has separated herself from us by her own deeds when through pride she assumed a monarchy which does not belong to her office... How shall we accept decrees from her that have been issued without consulting us and even without our knowledge? If the Roman pontiff seated on the lofty throne of his glory wished to thunder at us and, so to speak, hurl his mandates at us from on high and if he wishes to judge us and even to rule us and our churches, not by taking counsel with us but at his own arbitrary pleasure what kind of brotherhood, or even what kind of parenthood can this be? We should be the slaves not the sons, of such a church and the Roman see would not be the pious mother of sons but a hard and imperious mistress of slaves

— Archbishop Nicetas of Nicomedia of the Twelfth Century

== Hesychast Controversy ==
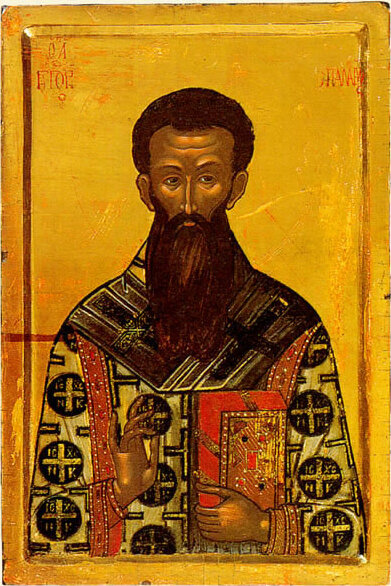
Gregory Palamas

Under church tradition the practice of Hesychasm has it beginnings in the bible, Matthew 6:6 and the Philokalia. The tradition of contemplation with inner silence or tranquility is shared by all Eastern ascenticism having its roots in the Egyptian traditions of monasticism exemplified by such Orthodox monastics as St. Anthony of Egypt. About the year 1337 Hesychasm attracted the attention of a learned member of the Orthodox Church, Barlaam, a Calabrian monk who at that time held the office of abbot in the Monastery of Holy Saviour's in Constantinople and who visited Mount Athos. There, Barlaam encountered Hesychasts and heard descriptions of their practices, also reading the writings of the teacher in Hesychasm of St. Gregory Palamas, himself an Athonite monk. Hesychasm is a form of constant purposeful prayer or experiential prayer, explicitly referred to as contemplation. It is to focus one's mind on God and pray to God unceasingly. The hesychasts stated that at higher stages of their prayer practice they reached the actualcontemplation-union with the Tabor Light, i.e., Uncreated Divine Light or photomos seen by the apostles in the event of the Transfiguration of Christ and Saint Paul while on the road to Damascus. It is depicted in icons and theological discourse also as tongues of fire.

Trained in Western Scholastic theology, Barlaam was scandalized by Hesychasm and began to campaign against it. As a teacher of theology in the Western Scholastic mode, Barlaam propounded a more intellectual and propositional approach to the knowledge of God than the Hesychasts taught. In particular, Barlaam took exception to, as heretical and blasphemous, the doctrine entertained by the Hesychasts as to the nature of the uncreated light, the experience of which was said to be the goal of Hesychast practice. It was maintained by the Hesychasts to be of divine origin and to be identical to that light which had been manifested to Jesus' disciples on Mount Tabor at the Transfiguration. Barlaam held this concept to be polytheistic, inasmuch as it postulated two eternal substances, a visible (immanent) and an invisible God (transcendent).

On the Hesychast side, the controversy was taken up by Athonite St. Gregory Palamas, afterwards Archbishop of Thessalonica, who was asked by his fellow monks on Mt Athos to defend Hesychasm from Barlaam's attacks. St. Gregory was well-educated in Greek philosophy (dialectical method) and thus able to defend Hesychasm using Western precepts. In the 1340s, he defended Hesychasm at three different synods in Constantinople, and also wrote a number of works in its defense.

In 1341 the dispute came before a synod held at Constantinople and was presided over by the Emperor Andronicus; the synod, taking into account the regard in which the writings of the pseudo-Dionysius were held, condemned Barlaam, who recanted and returned to Calabria, afterwards becoming a bishop in the Roman Catholic Church. Three other synods on the subject were held, at the second of which the followers of Barlaam gained a brief victory. But in 1351 at a synod under the presidency of the Emperor John VI Cantacuzenus, Hesychast doctrine and Palamas' Essence-Energies distinction was established as the doctrine of the Orthodox Church.

One of Barlaam's friends, Gregory Akindynos, who originally was also a friend of Gregory's, later took up the controversy. Another opponent of Palamism was Manuel Kalekas who sought to reconcile the Eastern and Western Churches. Following the decision of 1351, there was strong repression against anti-Palamist thinkers. Kalekas reports on this repression as late as 1397, and for theologians in disagreement with Palamas, there was ultimately no choice but to emigrate and convert to Catholicism, a path taken by Kalekas as well as Demetrios Kydones and Ioannes Kypariossiotes. This exodus of highly educated Greek scholars, later reinforced by refugees following the Fall of Constantinople of 1453, had a significant influence on the first generation (that of Petrarca and Boccaccio) of the incipient Italian Renaissance.

== The "Western Captivity" ==
According to John Binns, Western influence is "generally seen as destructive, introducing non-Orthodox ways of thinking into the Church". Georges Florovsky characterized Orthodox theology as having gone through a "pseudomorphosis" during the "Western Captivity" of the seventeenth, eighteenth and early nineteenth centuries. He argued that Orthodox theologians of this period were trapped in the paradigms of Western thought and were unable to fully appreciate the teachings of the Church Fathers.

John Binns describes the relocation of Greek scholarship to Italy after the fall of the Byzantine Empire to the Ottoman Turks. The lack of Christian educational institutions within the Ottoman Empire led to a decline of education among the clergy. According to Binns, it was estimated that, when Greece won its independence from the Ottoman Empire, only ten out of the thousand priests could write their own names.

== Hesychast renewal movements ==
The Hesychast traditions survived throughout Ottoman period, particularly in the monastic centres on Mount Athos. During the eighteenth century, an important spiritual revival (whose effects are still felt today) began and spread to many Orthodox regions. Central to this renewal was the Philokalia, an anthology of spiritual writings compiled by Saint Nicodemus of the Holy Mountain ("the Hagiorite", 1748–1809), with the aid of Saint Macarius (Notaras), the Metropolitan of Corinth (1731–1805). The anthology was also printed at Venice, in 1782, and it contained the works of authors from the fourth century to the fifteenth, dealing mainly with the theory and practice of prayer (especially the Jesus Prayer). It has proven to be one of the most influential publications in Orthodox history, being widely read not only by monks, but also by many living in the world.

This spiritual movement was also expanded to other regions, by the efforts of Saint Paissy Velichkovsky (1722–1794), who after being disappointed by the secular tones used at the theological academy of Kiev, became a monk and travelled to Mount Athos, to learn about Hesychasm. In 1763, he moved to the Romanian principality of Moldavia, where he was chosen abbot of the Neamț Monastery, which soon became a great spiritual centre, gathering more than 500 brethren. Under his guidance, the community translated the Philokalia into Slavonic, which was published at Moscow, in 1793. Paissy himself din not return to Russia, but many of his disciples travelled there, from Romania, and established many new monastic centres, dedicated to the Hesychast tradition (such as the Optina Monastery). Important Russian Hesychasts of the 19th century, included Saint Seraphim of Sarov (1759–1833), and the Optino elders, Leonid (1768–1860), Macarius (1788–1860) and Ambrose (1812–1891). During the period 1876–1890, Saint Theophan the Recluse (1815–1894) also completed an expanded translation of the Philokalia, in Russian. This spiritual renewal contributed heavily to the flowering of Orthodox theology in the 20th century.

== Slavophile movement ==
The Slavophiles promoted Orthodox Christianity as Russia's defining feature, hoping to make the Orthodox Church synonymous with Russian native culture. Starting with Vladimir Soloviev, sobornost was put forth as the basis for the ecumenical movement within the Russian Orthodox Church. Sergei Bulgakov, Nikolai Berdyaev, Pavel Florensky were notable proponents for the spirit of sobornost between different Christian factions.

== 20th century ==
John Behr characterizes Orthodox theology as having been "reborn in the twentieth century." Norman Russell describes Orthodox theology as having been dominated by an "arid scholasticism" for several centuries after the fall of Constantinople. Russell describes the postwar re-engagement of modern Greek theologians with the Greek Fathers with the help of diaspora theologians and Western patristic scholars. A significant component of this re-engagement with the Greek Fathers has been a rediscovery of Palamas by Greek theologians who had previously been given less attention than the other Fathers.

According to Michael Angold, the "rediscovery of [Palamas'] writings by theologians of the last century has played a crucial role in the construction of present-day Orthodoxy. Bishop Kallistos (Ware) has predicted that "the twentieth century will be remembered as the century of Palamas".

=== Russian émigré theologians ===
After the Russian Revolution, many Orthodox theologians fled Russia and founded centers of Orthodox theology in the West. The most notable of these were the Orthodox Theological Institute of St. Serguis in Paris and Orthodox Seminary of St. Vladimir in New York. Daniel Payne asserts that, in the 1940s, "Russian émigré theologians rediscovered the ascetic-theology of St. Gregory Palamas." From this rediscovery, according to Payne, "Palamas' theology became the basis for an articulation of an Orthodox theological identity apart from Roman Catholic and Protestant influences. Florovsky and Lossky opposed the efforts of the Slavophile movement to identify a uniquely Russian approach to Orthodox theology. They advocated instead a return to the Greek fathers in what Florovsky called a "Neo-Patristic Synthesis". Payne characterizes the work of Georges Florovsky and Vladimir Lossky as having "set the course for Orthodox theology in the twentieth century."

Metropolitan Hilarion Alfayev identifies five main streams within the theology of the "Paris school".

The first, associated with the names of Archimandrite Cyprian (Kern), Fr. Georges Florovsky, Vladimir Lossky, Archbishop Basil (Krivocheine) and Fr. John Meyendorff, was dedicated to the cause of "Patristic revival."

The second stream, represented in particular by Fr. Sergius Bulgakov, is rooted in the Russian religious renaissance of the late nineteenth and early twentieth century; here, the influence of Eastern patristics was interwoven with German idealism and the religious views of Vladimir Soloviev stream.

The third prepared the ground for the "liturgical revival" in the Orthodox Church and is related to the names of Fr. Nicholas Afanassieff and Fr. Alexander Schmemann.

Characteristic of the fourth stream was an interest in Russian history, literature, culture and spirituality; to this stream belong G. Fedotov, K. Mochulsky, I. Kontzevich, Fr. Sergius Tchetverikoff, A. Kartashev and N. Zernov, to name but a few.

The fifth stream developed the traditions of Russian religious philosophical thought and was represented by N. Lossky, S. Frank, L. Shestoff and Fr. Basil Zenkovsky.

One of the central figures of "Russian Paris" was Nicholas Berdyaev, who belonged to none of these...

According to Michael Gibson, "Lossky's paradigm pivots on a double-sided narrative that posits a theological failure of the West characterized as 'rationalist' and 'philosophical,' the antithesis of which is the unbroken Eastern theological tradition of pure apophaticism and mystico-ecclesial experience."

=== Postwar Greek theologians ===
As the first generation of Russian emigre theologians died out, the torch was taken up by Greek theologians in the postwar period. Until the 1950s, Greek theology had tended towards a scholastic approach. David Ford characterizes it as "doctrinal 'capita' with patristic catenae added". The impact of Florovsky and Lossky began to spread beyond the Slavic Orthodoxy.

According to Daniel Payne, "Romanides and Yannaras want(ed) to remove the Western and pagan elements from the Hellenic identity and replace it with the Orthodox identity rooted in Hesychast spirituality based on the teachings of Gregory Palamas."

John Romanides developed a theology which was vehemently anti-Augustinian. His work had a significant influence on theological dialogue between the Eastern Orthodox Church and the Oriental Orthodox Churches.

Christos Yannaras argues that the introduction of Western Scholasticism into Orthodox theology inevitably led to the confusion present in the modern Hellenic identity. The adverse effects of this corruption of Greek Orthodox thought for the rise of Greek nationalism, the acceptance and formation of the modern Hellenic nation-state, and the establishment of the Greek Orthodox Church as an autocephalous national church separate from the patriarchate of Constantinople.

John Zizioulas is arguably the most widely read Orthodox theologian in the West.

== Modern ecumenism ==
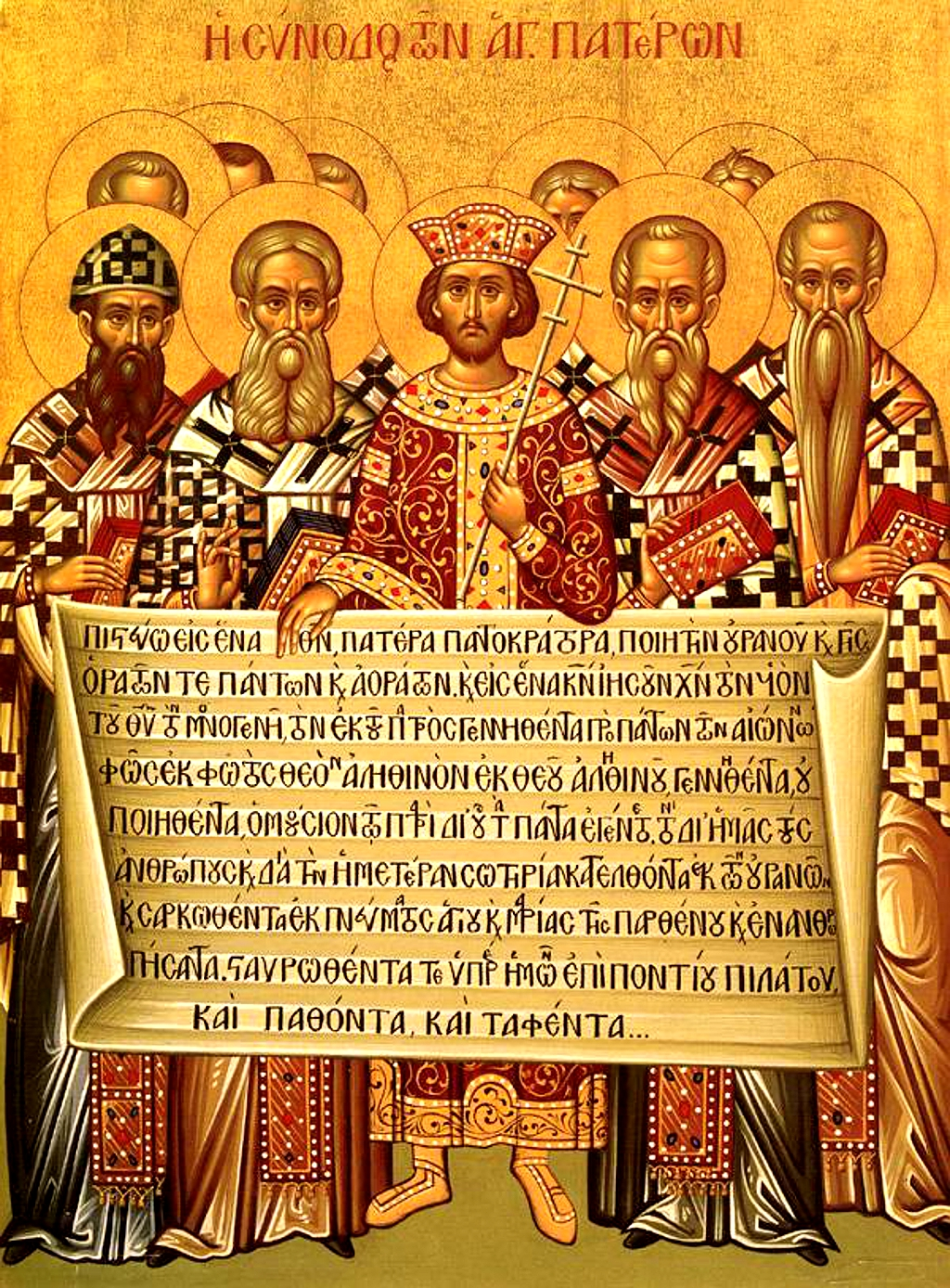
Icon depicting the Emperor Constantine (centre) and the bishops of the First Council of Nicaea (325) holding the Niceno–Constantinopolitan Creed of 381.

Modern Ecumenism between different Orthodox groups of the Mideast is a long and evolving process, as evidenced by the active ecumenical movement between the Oriental Orthodox and the Eastern Orthodox, as well as the recent reconciliation between the Patriarch of Moscow and ROCOR (see Act of Canonical Communion with the Moscow Patriarchate), and the active communication between the Catholic Church and the Eastern Orthodox and Oriental Orthodox communities.

=== Catholic-Orthodox dialogue ===
Over the last century, a number of moves have been made to reconcile the schism between the Catholic Church and the Eastern Orthodox churches. Although progress has been made, concerns over papal primacy and the independence of the smaller Orthodox churches has blocked a final resolution of the schism. Some of the most difficult questions in relations with the ancient Eastern Churches concern some doctrine (i.e. Filioque, Scholasticism, functional purposes of asceticism, the essence of God, Hesychasm, Fourth Crusade, establishment of the Latin Empire, Uniatism to note but a few) as well as practical matters such as the concrete exercise of the claim to papal primacy and how to ensure that ecclesiastical union would not mean mere absorption of the smaller Churches by the Latin component of the much larger Catholic Church (the most numerous single religious denomination in the world), and the stifling or abandonment of their own rich theological, liturgical and cultural heritage.

On 7 December 1965, a Joint Catholic–Orthodox Declaration of Pope Paul VI and the Ecumenical Patriarch Athenagoras I was issued lifting the mutual excommunications of 1054.

In June 2004 the Ecumenical Patriarch Bartholomew I's visit to Rome for the Feast of Saints Peter and Paul (29 June) afforded him the opportunity for another personal meeting with Pope John Paul II, for conversations with the Pontifical Council for Promoting Christian Unity and for taking part in the celebration for the feast day in St. Peter's Basilica.

The Patriarch's partial participation in the Eucharistic liturgy at which the Pope presided followed the program of the past visits of Patriarch Dimitrios (1987) and Patriarch Bartholomew I himself: full participation in the Liturgy of the Word, joint proclamation by the Pope and by the Patriarch of the profession of faith according to the Nicene-Constantinopolitan Creed in Greek and as the conclusion, the final Blessing imparted by both the Pope and the Patriarch at the Altar of the Confessio. The Patriarch did not fully participate in the Liturgy of the Eucharist involving the consecration and distribution of the Eucharist itself.

In accordance with the Roman Catholic Church's practice of including the clause when reciting the Creed in Latin, but not when reciting the Creed in Greek, Popes John Paul II and Benedict XVI have recited the Nicene Creed jointly with Patriarchs Demetrius I and Bartholomew I in Greek without the Filioque clause. The action of these Patriarchs in reciting the Creed together with the Popes has been strongly criticized by some elements of Eastern Orthodoxy, such as the Metropolitan of Kalavryta, Greece, in November 2008.

The declaration of Ravenna in 2007 re-asserted these beliefs, and re-stated the notion that the bishop of Rome is indeed the protos, although future discussions are to be held on the concrete ecclesiological exercise of papal primacy.

== See also ==
- Eastern Orthodox – Roman Catholic theological differences
- Eastern Orthodox – Roman Catholic ecclesiastical differences
- Chalcedonian Christianity
- Christian Church
- Eastern Catholic Churches (Uniatism)
- Eastern Orthodox Christian theology
- Four Marks of the Church
- Great Church
- History of Christian theology
- History of Eastern Christianity
- History of the Eastern Orthodox Church
- History of the papacy
- History of Roman Catholic Mariology
- Lex orandi, lex credendi
- Eastern Orthodox opposition to papal supremacy
- Eastern Orthodox teaching regarding the Filioque
- Seven Ecumenical Councils

== Sources ==
- The Orthodox Church. Ware, Timothy. Penguin Books, 1997. (ISBN 0-14-014656-3)
- The Orthodox Church; 455 Questions and Answers. Harakas, Stanley H. Light and Life Publishing Company, 1988. (ISBN 0-937032-56-5)
- The Spirituallity of the Christian East: A systematic handbook by Tomas Spidlik, Cistercian Publications Inc Kalamazoo Michigan 1986 ISBN 0-87907-879-0
- Orthodox Dogmatic Theology: A Concise Exposition Protopresbyter Michael Pomazansky St Herman of Alaska Brotherhood press 1994 (ISBN 0-938635-69-7)
- The Mystical Theology of the Eastern Church, Vladimir Lossky SVS Press, 1997. (ISBN 0-913836-31-1) James Clarke & Co Ltd, 1991. (ISBN 0-227-67919-9)
- Orthodox Theology: An Introduction, Vladimir Lossky SVS Press, 2001. (ISBN 0-913836-43-5)
- In the Image and Likeness of God, Vladimir Lossky SVS Press, 1997. (ISBN 0-913836-13-3)
- The Vision of God, Vladimir Lossky SVS Press, 1997. (ISBN 0-913836-19-2)
- The Orthodox Way (St Vladimir's Seminary Press, 1995, ISBN 0-913836-58-3)
- The Inner Kingdom: Collected Works, Vol. 1 (St Vladimir's Seminary Press, 2000, ISBN 0-88141-209-0)
- In the Image of the Trinity: Collected Works, Vol. 2 (St Vladimir's Seminary Press, 2006, ISBN 0-88141-225-2)
- Communion and Intercommunion (Light & Life, 1980, ISBN 0-937032-20-4)
- How Are We Saved?: The Understanding of Salvation in the Orthodox Tradition (Light & Life, 1996, ISBN 1-880971-22-4)
- Orthodox Dogmatic Theology: A Concise Exposition Protopresbyter Michael Pomazansky St Herman of Alaska Brotherhood press 1994 (ISBN 0-938635-69-7) Online version
- Let There Be Light: An Orthodox Christian Theory of Human Evolution For the 21st Century (Theandros, Summer 2008, ISSN 1555-936X)
