= History of Eastern Orthodox theology in the 20th century =

20th century Eastern Orthodox theology has been dominated by neo-Palamism, the revival of St. Palamas and hesychasm. John Behr characterizes Eastern Orthodox theology as having been "reborn in the twentieth century." Norman Russell describes Eastern Orthodox theology as having been dominated by an "arid scholasticism" for several centuries after the fall of Constantinople. Russell describes the postwar re-engagement of modern Greek theologians with the Greek Fathers, which occurred with the help of diaspora theologians and Western patristic scholars. A significant component of this re-engagement with the Greek Fathers has been a rediscovery of Palamas by Greek theologians; Palamas had previously been given less attention than the other Fathers.

According to Michael Angold, the "rediscovery of [Palamas'] writings by theologians of the last century has played a crucial role in the construction of present-day [Eastern] Orthodoxy.

== Russian émigré theologians ==
After the Russian Revolution, many Orthodox theologians fled Russia and founded centers of Orthodox theology in the West. The most notable of these were the St. Sergius Orthodox Theological Institute in Paris and Saint Vladimir's Orthodox Theological Seminary in New York. Daniel Payne asserts that, in the 1940s, "Russian émigré theologians rediscovered the ascetic-theology of St. Gregory Palamas." From this rediscovery, according to Payne, "Palamas' theology became the basis for an articulation of an Orthodox theological identity apart from Roman Catholic and Protestant influences. Florovsky and Lossky opposed the efforts of the Slavophile movement to identify a uniquely Russian approach to Orthodox theology. They advocated instead a return to the Greek fathers in what Florovsky called a "Neo-Patristic Synthesis". Payne characterizes the work of Georges Florovsky and Vladimir Lossky as having "set the course for Orthodox theology in the twentieth century."

Metropolitan Hilarion Alfayev identifies five main streams within the theology of the "Paris school".

The first, associated with the names of Archimandrite Cyprian (Kern), Fr. Georges Florovsky, Vladimir Lossky, Archbishop Basil (Krivocheine) and Fr. John Meyendorff, was dedicated to the cause of "Patristic revival."

The second stream, represented in particular by Fr. Sergius Bulgakov, is rooted in the Russian religious renaissance of the late nineteenth and early twentieth century; here, the influence of Eastern patristics was interwoven with German idealism and the religious views of Vladimir Soloviev stream.

The third prepared the ground for the "liturgical revival" in the Orthodox Church and is related to the names of Fr. Nicholas Afanassieff and Fr. Alexander Schmemann.

Characteristic of the fourth stream was an interest in Russian history, literature, culture and spirituality; to this stream belong G. Fedotov, K. Mochulsky, I. Kontzevich, Fr. Sergius Tchetverikoff, A. Kartashev and N. Zernov, to name but a few.

The fifth stream developed the traditions of Russian religious philosophical thought and was represented by N. Lossky, S. Frank, L. Shestoff and Fr. Basil Zenkovsky.

One of the central figures of "Russian Paris" was Nicholas Berdyaev, who belonged to none of these...

According to Michael Gibson, "Lossky's paradigm pivots on a double-sided narrative that posits a theological failure of the West characterized as 'rationalist' and 'philosophical,' the antithesis of which is the unbroken Eastern theological tradition of pure apophaticism and mystico-ecclesial experience."

=== Vladimir Lossky ===
Vladimir Lossky's main theological concern was exegesis on mysticism in the Orthodox tradition. He stated in The Mystical Theology of the Eastern Church that the Orthodox maintained their mystical tenets while the West lost them after the East-West Schism. A loss of these tenets by the West was due to a misunderstanding of Greek terms such as ousia, hypostasis, theosis, and theoria. He cites much of the mysticism of the Eastern Orthodox Church as expressed in such works as the Philokalia, St John Climacus's Ladder of Divine Ascent, and various others by Pseudo-Dionysius the Areopagite, St Gregory of Nyssa, St Basil the Great, St Gregory Nazianzus, and St Gregory Palamas. Father Georges Florovsky termed V Lossky's Mystical Theology of the Eastern Church as a "neopatristic synthesis".

Lossky's main tenet of the Mystical Theology was to show through reference to the Greek Fathers works of the ancient Church that their theosis was above knowledge (gnosis). This was further clarified in his work Vision of God (or theoria). In both works Lossky shows some of the differences between Eastern Orthodoxy i.e. Saint Dionysius the Areopagite's work and Plotinus and the tenets of Neoplatonism. Asserting that Eastern Orthodoxy and Neoplatonism, though they share common culture and concepts, are not the same thing and have very different understandings of God and ontology.

Lossky, like his close friend Father Georges Florovsky, was opposed to the sophiological theories of Father Sergei Bulgakov and Vladimir Soloviev. In the words of Lossky's own father N. O. Lossky, "One characteristic of his theology that should be underscored, is that he was not, and always refused to be, a direct descendant of the famous Russian "religious philosophy"1. The term Russian religious philosophy being Neoplatonic as such, having its origin in the works of the slavophile movement and its core concept of sobornost, which was later used and developed by Vladimir Soloviev.

=== Georges Florovsky ===
During the 1930s, Georges Florovsky undertook extensive researches in European libraries and wrote his most important works in the area of patristics as well as his magnum opus, Ways of Russian Theology. In this massive work, he questioned the Western influences of scholasticism, pietism, and idealism on Russian theology and called for a re-evaluation of Russian theology in the light of patristic writings. One of his most prominent critics was Nikolai Berdyaev, the religious philosopher and social critic.

=== John Meyendorff ===
John Meyendorff's doctoral dissertation on Palamas is considered to have transformed the opinion of the Western Church regarding Palamism. Before his study of Palamas, Palamism was considered to be a "curious and sui generis example of medieval Byzantium's intellectual decline". Meyendorff's landmark study of Palamas however, "set Palamas firmly within the context of Greek patristic thought and spirituality" with the result that Palamism is now generally understood to be "a faithful witness to the long-standing Eastern Christian emphasis on deification (theosis) as the purpose of the divine economy in Christ."

Roman Catholic Jean-Yves Lacoste describes Meyendorff's characterization of Palamas' theology and the reception of Meyendorff's thesis by the Orthodox world of the latter half of the 20th century:

For J. Meyendorff, Gregory Palamas has perfected the patristic and concilar heritage, against the secularizing tide that heralds the Renaissance and the Reformation, by correcting its Platonizing excesses along biblical and personalist lines. Palamitism, which is impossible to compress into a system, is then viewed as the apophatic expression of a mystical existentialism. Accepted by the Orthodox world (with the exception of Romanides), this thesis justifies the Palamite character of contemporary research devoted to ontotheological criticism (Yannaras), to the metaphysics of the person (Clement), and to phenomenology of ecclesiality (Zizioulas) or of the Holy Spirit (Bobrinskoy).

A number of notable Orthodox theologians, such as John Romanides have criticized Meyendorff's understanding of Palamas as flawed. Romanides argued that Meyendorff's entire characterization of Palamas' teachings was erroneous, criticizing what he called Meyendorff's "imaginative theories concerning Palamite monistic prayer and anthropology, and Incarnational and sacramental heart mysticism." According to Duncan Reid, the theme of the debate between Meyendorff and Romanides centered on the relationship between nominalism and Palamite theology. Romanides characterized Meyendorff as engaged in an "obsessed struggle to depict Palamas as an heroic Biblical theologian putting to the sword of Christological Correctives the last remnants of Greek Patristic Platonic Aphophaticism and its supposed linear descendants, the Byzantine Platonic-nominalistic humanists." Orthodox theologians such as John Romanides, Alexander Golitzin, and Andrew Louth have argued against Meyendorff's interpretation of the works of Pseudo-Dionysius the Areopagite and have strenuously asserted the Orthodoxy of the Dionysian corpus.

== Postwar Greek theologians ==
As the first generation of Russian emigre theologians died out, the torch was taken up by Greek theologians in the postwar period. Until the 1950s, Greek theology had tended towards a scholastic approach. David Ford characterizes it as "doctrinal 'capita' with patristic catenae added". The impact of Florovsky and Lossky began to spread beyond the Slavic Orthodoxy.

According to Daniel Payne, "Romanides and Yannaras want(ed) to remove the Western and pagan elements from the Hellenic identity and replace it with the Orthodox identity rooted in Hesychast spirituality based on the teachings of Gregory Palamas."

John Romanides developed a theology which was vehemently anti-Augustinian. His work had a significant influence on theological dialogue between the Eastern Orthodox Church and the Oriental Orthodox Churches.

Christos Yannaras argues that the introduction of Western Scholasticism into Orthodox theology inevitably led to the confusion present in modern Hellenic identity. The adverse effects of this corruption of Greek Orthodox thought for the rise of Greek nationalism, the acceptance and formation of the modern Hellenic nation-state, and the establishment of the Church of Greece as an autocephalous national Church separate from the Patriarchate of Constantinople.

John Zizioulas is arguably the most widely read Orthodox theologian in the West.

=== John Romanides ===
John Romanides contributed many speculations, some controversial, about the cultural and religious differences between Eastern and Western Christianity, and how these divergences have impacted the Church's development and influenced the Christian cultures of East and West. He was especially concerned about ways in which Western intellectual culture had, in his view, compromised Greek national identity.

His theological works emphasize the empirical basis of theology called theoria, or vision of God, as the essence of Orthodox theology. He identified hesychasmas the core of Christian practice and studied extensively the works of 14th-century hesychast and theologian St. Gregory Palamas.

His research on dogmatic theology led him to examine the close links between doctrinal differences and historical developments. Thus, in his later years, he concentrated on historical research, mostly of the Middle Ages but also of the 18th and 19th centuries.

Romanides criticized Meyendorff's understanding of Palamas as flawed. Romanides described Myendorff as engaged in an "obsessed struggle to depict Palamas as an heroic Biblical theologian putting to the sword of Christological Correctives the last remnants of Greek Patristic Platonic Aphophaticism and its supposed linear descendants, the Byzantine Platonic-nominalistic humanists."

=== Christos Yannaras ===
The main volume of Yannaras' work represents a long course on study and research of the differences between the Greek and Western European philosophy and tradition. Differences that are not limited at the level of theory only, but also define a mode (praxis) of life.

== Sources ==
- The Orthodox Church. Ware, Timothy. Penguin Books, 1997. (ISBN 0-14-014656-3)
- The Orthodox Church; 455 Questions and Answers. Harakas, Stanley H. Light and Life Publishing Company, 1988. (ISBN 0-937032-56-5)
- The Spirituallity of the Christian East: A systematic handbook by Tomas Spidlik, Cistercian Publications Inc Kalamazoo Michigan 1986 ISBN 0-87907-879-0
- Orthodox Dogmatic Theology: A Concise Exposition Protopresbyter Michael Pomazansky St Herman of Alaska Brotherhood press 1994 (ISBN 0-938635-69-7)
- The Mystical Theology of the Eastern Church, Vladimir Lossky SVS Press, 1997. (ISBN 0-913836-31-1) James Clarke & Co Ltd, 1991. (ISBN 0-227-67919-9)
- Orthodox Theology: An Introduction, Vladimir Lossky SVS Press, 2001. (ISBN 0-913836-43-5)
- In the Image and Likeness of God, Vladimir Lossky SVS Press, 1997. (ISBN 0-913836-13-3)
- The Vision of God, Vladimir Lossky SVS Press, 1997. (ISBN 0-913836-19-2)
- The Orthodox Way (St Vladimir's Seminary Press, 1995, ISBN 0-913836-58-3)
- The Inner Kingdom: Collected Works, Vol. 1 (St Vladimir's Seminary Press, 2000, ISBN 0-88141-209-0)
- In the Image of the Trinity: Collected Works, Vol. 2 (St Vladimir's Seminary Press, 2006, ISBN 0-88141-225-2)
- Communion and Intercommunion (Light & Life, 1980, ISBN 0-937032-20-4)
- How Are We Saved?: The Understanding of Salvation in the Orthodox Tradition (Light & Life, 1996, ISBN 1-880971-22-4)
- Orthodox Dogmatic Theology: A Concise Exposition Protopresbyter Michael Pomazansky St Herman of Alaska Brotherhood press 1994 (ISBN 0-938635-69-7) Online version
- Let There Be Light: An Orthodox Christian Theory of Human Evolution For the 21st Century (Theandros, Summer 2008, ISSN 1555-936X)
