= John Meyendorff =

Eastern Orthodox Priest and scholar

- Born: Ivan Feofilovich Meyendorf; 17 February 1926; Neuilly-sur-Seine, France
- Died: 22 July 1992 (aged 66); Montreal, Canada
- Occupations: Eastern Orthodox priest, theologian
- Relatives: Feofil Egorovich Meyendorf (grandfather)

John Meyendorff (French: Jean Meyendorff; Russian: Иоанн Мейендорф; February 17, 1926 – July 22, 1992) was a leading theologian of the Orthodox Church of America as well as a writer and teacher. He served as the dean of St. Vladimir's Orthodox Theological Seminary in the United States until June 30, 1992.

== Life ==
=== Early life ===
Meyendorff was born on February 17, 1926, in Neuilly-sur-Seine, France, into the émigré Russian nobility as Ivan Feofilovich Meyendorf (Иван Феофилович Мейендорф). He was the grandson of Baron General Feofil Egorovich Meyendorff.

Meyendorff completed his secondary education in France and his theological education at the St. Sergius Orthodox Theological Institute in Paris in 1949. In 1948, he also received a licentiate at the Sorbonne, and later earned a Diplôme d'Études Supérieures (1949) and a Diplôme de l'école pratique des Hautes Études (1954). He earned the degree of Doctor of Theology in 1958 with a groundbreaking doctoral thesis on the teachings of St. Gregory Palamas.

=== Theological career ===
In France, Meyendorff was an assistant professor of church history at the St. Sergius Institute, and a Fellow at the Centre National de la Recherche Scientifique.

After his ordination to the priesthood in the Orthodox Church in 1959, Meyendorff and his family moved to the United States. There he joined the faculty of Saint Vladimir's Seminary, first located in New York City then in Crestwood, Yonkers, New York, as a professor of Church history and patristics. Additionally, he held successive joint appointments as a lecturer in Byzantine theology at Harvard University, Dumbarton Oaks (to which he returned for a semester as acting director of studies in 1977), and as professor of Byzantine history at Fordham University (from 1967). He also was adjunct professor at Columbia University and Union Theological Seminary, both in New York City, and lectured widely on university campuses and at church events. He held the position of dean of St. Vladimir's Seminary from March 1984 until June 1992.

Meyendorff was a major voice in the Orthodox community and worked for the reunion of the three splinter groups into which the Russian Orthodox Church broke up after the Russian Revolution. He was instrumental in the establishment of the Orthodox Church in America as an independent entity in 1970, and urged the various Orthodox Churches in the United States, which were ethnically based, to grow closer together in their shared faith. He frequently represented the Orthodox tradition in ecumenical gatherings, such as the Uppsala Assembly held in 1968 by the World Council of Churches, during his tenure as chairman of its Faith and Order Commission (1967–1975).

=== Death and legacy ===
While on vacation at the family's summer home in Quebec following his resignation, Meyendorff took ill and was taken to St. Mary's Hospital in Montreal. He died there on 22 July as the result of pancreatic cancer.

His son, Paul Meyendorff (born 1950), also taught at St. Vladimir's Seminary holding the position of Professor of Liturgical Theology.

In memory of John Meyendorff, the Fordham University instituted the Father John Meyendorff & Patterson Family Chair of Orthodox Christian Studies, thanks to a contribution given by the philanthropers Solon and Marianna Patterson.

== Publications and courses ==
Meyendorff's publications include the critical text and translation of Byzantine theologian Gregory Palamas (1959), as well as a number of books in the fields of theology and history, such as A Study of Gregory Palamas (French ed., 1959; Engl. 1964); The Orthodox Church (1963); Orthodoxy and Catholicity (1966); Christ in Eastern Christian Thought (1969); Byzantine Theology (1973); Marriage, an Orthodox Perspective (1975); Living Tradition (1978); Byzantium and the Rise of Russia (1980); The Byzantine Legacy in the Orthodox Church (1981); Catholicity and the Church (1983); and Imperial unity and Christian divisions. The Church 450–680 A.D. (1989); Rome, Constantinople, Moscow: Historical and Theological Studies (1996). His books have been published in a number of languages, including French, German, Italian, Russian, Greek, English, Finnish, Spanish, Dutch, Korean, Japanese, Serbian, Romanian, Polish, Hungarian and Chinese.

== Study of Gregory Palamas ==
Meyendorff's doctoral dissertation on Palamas is considered to have transformed the opinion of some in the Western Church regarding Palamism. Before his study of Palamas, Palamite theology was considered to be a "curious and sui generis example of medieval Byzantium's intellectual decline." Meyendorff's landmark study of Palamas however, "set Palamas firmly within the context of Greek patristic thought and spirituality" with the result that Palamism is now generally understood to be "a faithful witness to the long-standing Eastern Christian emphasis on deification (theosis) as the purpose of the divine economy in Christ."

== Affiliations ==
A member of several professional associations, Meyendorff served during different periods as President of the Orthodox Theological Society in America, President of the American Patristic Association, and a member of the executive committee, U.S. Committee for Byzantine Studies. He was a Fellow of the National Endowment for the Humanities (1976–77), and a Guggenheim Fellow (1981).

During his service at the seminary, he held the positions of librarian, director of studies, and was long-time editor of St Vladimir's Theological Quarterly. His service to the church included positions as chairman of the Department of External Affairs of the Orthodox Church in America, as advisor to the Holy Synod, and as editor of the monthly newspaper The Orthodox Church.

As a representative of the Orthodox Church, he participated in the activities of the World Council of Churches, having been Chairman of the Commission on Faith and Order (1967–75) and a member of the Central Committee. Committed particularly to inter-Orthodox unity and cooperation, he was one of the founders and the first general secretary of Syndesmos (World Fellowship of Orthodox Youth Organizations), and served later as its president.

== Awards ==
Meyendorff held honorary doctorates from the University of Notre Dame and General Theological Seminary, and was a Corresponding Fellow of the British Academy.

Meyendorff was a Senior Fellow at Dumbarton Oaks. The Diploma of Honorary Member of the Leningrad Theological Academy was given to Meyendorff in May 1990. In June 1991, Fr John was awarded the Order of St Vladimir, 2nd Class, by Aleksy II, Patriarch of Moscow and All Russia.

== Legacy ==
From 9–11 February 2012, an International Conference "The Legacy of Fr John Meyendorff, Scholar and Churchman (1926-1992)" was held at the St. Sergius Institute in Paris, to honour the 20th anniversary of the death of Protopresbyter John Meyendorff. (Note: For a complete description of the international conference, including the detailed program and official report, visit the Website of St. Sergius Orthodox Theological Institute and the Conference blog.)

== Bibliography ==
- Meyendorff, John (1983) [1974]. Byzantine Theology: Historical Trends and Doctrinal Themes (Revised 2nd ed.). New York: Fordham University Press. ISBN 0-8232-0967-9. (2nd ed., 2nd printing with revisions)
  - Мейендорф, Иоанн (1983). Byzantine Theology: Historical Trends and Doctrinal Themes (2nd ed.). Fordham University Press. ISBN 0-8232-0967-9. Archived from the original on 7 March 2019 – via Православная энциклопедия Азбука веры | православный сайт. (transl. Orthodox Encyclopedia ABC of Faith | Orthodox website). — "Excerpts from 'Byzantine Theology: Historical Trends and Doctrinal Themes'" (2nd ed.). Holy Trinity Orthodox School | ROCA (descending from the ROCOR). 1983. Archived from the original on 10 December 2016.
  - Older editions on Google Books:
  1. Meyendorff, John (1979) [1974]. Byzantine Theology: Historical Trends and Doctrinal Themes (2nd ed.). New York: Fordham University Press.
  2. Meyendorff, John (1976) [1974]. Byzantine Theology: Historical Trends and Doctrinal Themes (Corrected 1st ed.). New York: Fordham University Press. ISBN 9780823209668.
  3. Meyendorff, John (1975) [1974]. Byzantine Theology: Historical Trends and Doctrinal Themes (British 1st ed.). London: Mowbrays. ISBN 9780264663067.
  4. Meyendorff, John (1974). Byzantine Theology: Historical Trends and Doctrinal Themes (1st ed.). New York: Fordham University Press. ISBN 9780823209651.
  - Other Translations:
  1. Vizantijsko Bogoslovlje, Kragujevac, 1985; tr. of Byzantine Theology: Historical Trends and Doctrinal Themes.
  2. Teologla bizantyjska. historia i doktiyna. Warsaw: Instytut Wydawn. Pax., 1984; tr. of Byzantine Theology: Historical Trends and Doctrinal Themes.
  3. La Teologia Bizantina: Sviluppi storid e temi dottrinali. Casale Monfeirate: Casa Editrice Marietti, 1984; tr. of Byzantine Theology: Historical Trends and Doctrinal Themes.
  4. Initiation a la théologie Byzantine: L'histoire et la doctrine. Paris: Cerf, 1975; tr. of Byzantine Theology: Historical Trends and Doctrinal Themes.
- Meyendorff, John (1996). Rome, Constantinople, Moscow: Historical and Theological Studies. Crestwood, NY: St. Vladimir's Seminary Press. ISBN 978-0-88141-134-8. (new edition in 2003)
- Meyendorff, John (1996) [1962]. The Orthodox Church: Its Past and Its Role in the World Today (Revised 4th ed.). Crestwood, NY: St. Vladimir's Seminary Press. ISBN 9780913836811.
- Unité de l'Empire et divisions des chrétiens, Paris: Éditions du Cerf, 1992; tr. of Imperial unity and Christian divisions.
- Meyendorff, John, ed. (1992) [1963]. The Primacy of Peter: Essays in Ecclesiology and the Early Church (3rd ed.). Crestwood, NY: St. Vladimir's Seminary Press. ISBN 9780881411256.
- The Legacy of St Vladimir, ed., with Fr. John Breck and Eleana Silk. Crestwood, NY: SVS Press, 1990.
- Vizantiia i Moskovskaia Rus': ocherk po istorii tserkovnykh i kul'turnykh sviazei v XIV veke. Paris: YMCA Press, 1990; tr. of Byzantium and the Rise of Russia.
- Christian Spirituality: Post-Reformation and Modern, ed., with L. Dupe, Don E. Saliers, ed. New York: Crossroad, 1989.
- Chrystus Zwyciezyl: Wokol Chryta Rusi Kijowskiej. Warsaw: Verbinum, 1989.
- Meyendorff, John (1989). Imperial unity and Christian divisions: The Church 450-680 A.D. The Church in history. Vol. 2. Crestwood, NY: St. Vladimir's Seminary Press. ISBN 9780881410563.
- Meyendorff, John (1989) [1981]. Byzantium and the Rise of Russia: A Study of Byzantino-Russian Relations in the Fourteenth Century (2nd ed.). Crestwood, NY: St. Vladimir's Seminary Press. ISBN 9780881410792.
- A Legacy of Excellence, ed., with Vladimir Borichevsky and William Schneirla. Crestwood, NY: SVS Press, 1988.
- Vyzantio kai Rosia: Meleton Vizantino-Rosikon Scheseon kata to 14 Aiona. Athens: Ekdoseis Domos, 1988; tr. of Byzantium and the Rise of Russia: A Study of Byzantine-Russian Relations in the Fourteenth Century.
- Christian Spirituality: High Middle Ages and Reformation, ed., with J. Raitt and B. McGinn. New York: Crossroad, 1987.
- Meyendorff, John (1987). The Vision of Unity. Crestwood, NY: St. Vladimir's Seminary Press. ISBN 9780881410686.
- Meyendorff, John (1987). Witness to the World. Crestwood, NY: St. Vladimir's Seminary Press. ISBN 9780881410693.
- Le Mariage dans la Perspective Orthodoxe. Paris: YMCA Press, 1986; tr. of Marriage, an Orthodox Perspective.
- "Christian Spirituality: Origins to the Twelfth Century," ed., with Bernard McGinn, World Spirituality, v. 16. New York: Crossroad, 1985.
- Vvedenie v sviatootecheskoe bogoslovie: konspekty lektsii. New York: Religious Books for Russia, 1985. 2nd ed.
- Marriage: An Orthodox Perspective, 3rd rev. ed. Crestwood, NY: SVS Press, 1984.
- Meyendorff, John (1983). Catholicity and the Church. Crestwood, NY: St. Vladimir's Seminary Press. ISBN 9780881410068.
- Gamos: mia Orthodoxe Prooptike. Athens: Ekdose Hieras Metropoleos Thevon kai Levadeias, 1983; tr. of Marriage: An Orthodox Perspective.
- Ho Hapos Gregorios ho Palamas kai he Orthodoxe Mystike paradose. Athens: Ekdoseis "Akritas," 1983; tr. of St Grégoire Palamas et la mystique orthodoxe.
- Sveti Grigorije Palama i pravoslavna mistika. Beograd, 1983; tr. of St Grégoire Palamas et la mystique orthodoxe.
- Ho Christos soterias semena Homilia-sychetese? Athens: Synaxe, 1985.
- The Triads: Gregory Palamas, ed., with introduction. New York: Paulist Press, 1983.
- Vvedenie v sviatootecheshoe bogoslovie: konspekfy lektsu. New York: Religious Books for Russia, 1982.
- Meyendorff, John (1982). The Byzantine Legacy in the Orthodox Church. Crestwood, NY: St. Vladimir's Seminary Press. ISBN 9780913836903.
- Meyendorff, John (1981). Byzantium and the Rise of Russia: A Study of Byzantino-Russian Relations in the Fourteenth Century (1st ed.). Cambridge: Cambridge University Press. ISBN 9780521135337.
- Meyendorff, John (1981) [1962]. The Orthodox Church: Its Past and Its Role in the World Today (Revised 3rd ed.). Crestwood, NY: St. Vladimir's Seminary Press.
- Pravoslavie v sovremennom mire, added title page: "Orthodoxy in the Contemporary World." New York: Chalidze Publications, 1981.
- Meyendorff, John (1978). Living Tradition: Orthodox Witness in the Contemporary World. Crestwood, NY: St. Vladimir's Seminary Press. ISBN 9780913836279.
- The Sacrament of Holy Matrimony. New York: Dept. of Religious Education, Orthodox Church in America, 1978; reprint of 1975 ed.
- Trinitarian Theology East and West: St Thomas Aquinas-St Gregory Palamas, with Michael Fahey. Brookline, MA: Holy Cross Orthodox Press, 1977.
- S. Gregorio Palamas e la mistica ortodossa. Torino: Piero Gribaudi Editore, 1976; tr. of St Grégoire Palamas et la mystique orthodoxe.
- St Grégoire Palamas et la mystique orthodoxe. Paris: Éditions du Seuil, 1976.
- Meyendorff, John (1975) [1969]. Christ in Eastern Christian Thought (2nd ed.). Crestwood, NY: St. Vladimir's Seminary Press. ISBN 9780913836279.
- Marriage, an Orthodox Perspective. Crestwood, NY: SVS Press, 1975; 2nd expanded ed.
- Byzantine Hesychasm: Historical, Theological and Social Problems: Collected Studies. London: Variorum Reprints, 1974.
- Cristologia Ortodossa. Roma: An. Veritas Editrice, 1974; tr. of Christ in Eastern Christian Thought
- St Gregory Palamas and Orthodox Spirituality. Crestwood, NY: SVS Press & Bedfordshire: Faith Press, 1974.
- A Study of Gregory Palamas, 2nd ed. Bedfordshire: Faith Press & Crestwood, NY: SVS Press, 1974.
- Defense des saints hesychastes, 2nd ed. Louvain: Spicilegium sacrum lovaniense, 1973. 2 v.
- The New Man: An Orthodox and Reformed Dialogue, ed., with Joseph McLelland. New Brunswick: Agora Books, 1973.
- Meyendorff, John, ed. (1973) [1963]. The Primacy of Peter (2nd ed.). Leighton Buzzard: Faith Press. ISBN 9780716403258.
- Marriage: An Orthodox Perspective. Crestwood, NY: SVS Press, 1970.
- "Le Christ dans la théologie byzantine," Bibliothèque oeumenique, 2. Serie orthodoxe. Paris: Éditions du Cerf, 1969.
- Meyendorff, John (1969). Christ in Eastern Christian Thought (1st ed.). Washington, DC: Corpus Books.; tr. of Le Christ dans la theologie Byzantine.
- L'Église Orthodoxe : hier et aujourd'hui, 2nd ed., rev. Paris: Éditions du Seuil, 1969.
- La Iglesia Ortodoxa: ayery hoy. Paris: Desclée de Brouwer, 1969; tr. of: L'Église Orthodoxe : hier et aujourd'hui.
- Sv. Grigorije Palama i pravoslavna mistika, 1969; tr. of St Grégoire Palamas et la mystique orthodoxe.
- "The Orthodox," Ecumenical Series. New York: Paulist Press, 1966.
- "The Orthodox," reprint. Minneapolis, MN: Light and Life, 1966. Originally published: New York: Paulist Press, 1966.
- Meyendorff, John (1966). Orthodoxy and Catholicity. New York: Sheed & Ward.; tr. of Orthodoxie et Catholicité.
- Orthodoxie et Catholicité. Paris: Éditions du Seuil, 1965.
- The Orthodox Church: Yesterday and Today. London: Darton-Longman, 1964.
- De Orthodoxe Kerk, roermond-maaseik, J.J. Romen & Zonan Vitgevers, 1964; tr. of L'Église Orthodoxe, hier et aujourd'hui.
- A Study of Gregory Palamas. London: Faith Press, 1964; tr. of Introduction a l'etude de Grégoire Palamas.
- Die Orthodoxe Kirchegestem undheute. Salzburg: Otto Muller Verlag, 1963; tr. of L'Église Orthodoxe, hier et aujourd'hui.
- Meyendorff, John, ed. (1963). The Primacy of Peter (1st ed.). London: Faith Press. ISBN 9780913836200.; tr. of La primauté de Pierre dans l'Église Orthodoxe.
- La Chiesa Ortodossa, hieri e oggi. Brescia: Morcelliana, 1962; tr. of L'Église Orthodoxe, hier et aujourd'hui.
- Meyendorff, John (1962). The Orthodox Church: Its Past and Its Role in the World Today (British 1st ed.). London: Darton, Longman & Todd.; tr. of L'Église Orthodoxe : hier et aujourd'hui.
- Meyendorff, John (1962). The Orthodox Church: Its Past and Its Role in the World Today (USA 1st ed.). New York: Pantheon Books.; tr. of L'Église Orthodoxe : hier et aujourd'hui.
- Syggrammata, ed., with B. Bobrinsky, P. Papaeuaggelou, and P. Christou. Thessaloniki: Endidetai syndromi tou basilieou Idrimatos, 1962.
- Der Primat des Petrus in der Orthodoxen Kirche, with N. Afanassief, et al. Zurich: EVZ-Verlag, 1961; tr. of La primauté de Pierre dans l'Église Orthodoxe.
- L'Église Orthodoxe, hier et aujourd'hui. Paris: Éditions du Seuil, 1960.
- Die Orthodox Kirche: gestern und heute. Salzburg: Muller, 1960; tr. of L'Église Orthodoxe : hier et aujourd'hui.
- "Grégoire Palamas. Défense des saints hesychastes : Introduction, texte critique, traduction, et notes." Louvain: "Spicilegium sacrum lovaniense," 1959; administration, ed. and tr., v. l, 383, v. 2, 383–767.
- "Introduction a l'étude de Grégoire Palamas," Patristica Sorbonensia, v. 3. Paris: Éditions du Seuil, 1959.
- "St Grégoire Palamas et la mystique orthodoxe," Maitres spirituels, n. 20. Paris: Éditions du Seuil, 1959.

== See also ==
- Hesychasm
- Essence-Energies distinction
- Pseudo-Dionysius the Areopagite
- Neoplatonism
- Apotheosis
- Theophany
- Michael Pomazansky
- John S. Romanides
- Vladimir Lossky
- sobornost
- Philokalia
- Phronema
- Uniatism
- Olivier Clement
- Archimandrite Sophrony
- Symeon the New Theologian
- Dumitru Stăniloae
- Hilarion Alfeyev

== Notes ==
Academic offices
Preceded by Alexander Schmemann	Dean of Saint Vladimir's Orthodox Theological Seminary; 1984-1992	Succeeded by Thomas Hopko
