= New orthodoxy =

New orthodoxy may refer to:

- Neo-orthodoxy
- Neo-orthodox Jews
- Neo-Orthodox Movement (Eastern Orthodox Churches)
