= Phronema =

Greek theological term

Phronema is a transliteration of the Greek word φρόνημα, which has the meanings of "mind", "spirit", "thought", "purpose", "will", and can have either a positive meaning ("high spirit", "resolution", "pride") or a bad sense ("presumption", "arrogance").

In the New Testament, the word is used four times in Saint Paul's Letter to the Romans: twice with "τῆς σαρκός" (of the flesh) and twice with "τοῦ πνεύματος" (of the spirit): "for the mind of the flesh [is] death, and the mind of the Spirit – life and peace; because the mind of the flesh [is] enmity to God [...] and He who is searching the hearts hath known what [is] the mind of the Spirit" (Romans 8:6- 27).

== Eastern Orthodox theology ==
The term phronema is used in Eastern Orthodox theology for one particular mindset or outlook – the Eastern Orthodox mind. The attaining of phronema in this sense is a matter of practicing the correct faith (orthodoxia) in the correct manner (orthopraxis). Attaining phronema is regarded as the first step toward theosis, the state of glorification.

Phronema is also the name of the official annual review of St Andrew's Greek Orthodox Theological College, Sydney, Australia. It presents articles and book reviews from Orthodox and non-Orthodox on topics with central reference to theology, Church history and Orthodoxy.

== Use by John Henry Newman ==
The term was used by John Henry Newman in an article published in 1859 under the title "On Consulting the Faithful in Matters of Doctrine". He said that the consensus of the faithful is to be regarded as "a sort of instinct, or phronēma, deep in the bosom of the mystical body of Christ".

== Use by Ernst Haeckel ==
The term was used by Ernst Haeckel in his book The Wonders of Life where (p. 342) the phronema is the name given to a part of the cortex, as “the real organ of mind”.

== See also ==
- Hesychasm
- Praxis (Orthodox)
- Theoria
- Theosis (Eastern Orthodox theology)

People

- Alexander Schmemann
- Georges Florovsky
- John Meyendorff
- Vladimir Lossky
