= St. Dionysius Institute in Paris =

French Christian theological institute

St. Dionysius Theological Institute (St. Denys Theological Institute) is an Orthodox Christian theological institute in Paris, France. The institute functions under the auspices of the Orthodox Church of France, which is independent of the autocephalous Orthodox churches.

== Foundation ==
The institute was founded in 1945 by members of the Cathedral of St. Irenaeus in Paris (of the Orthodox Church of France) and by a number of French intellectuals who were not themselves Orthodox Christians - the first registrar, for example, was the French Roman Catholic philosopher, Gabriel Marcel. The institute was placed under the patronage of Saint Denys or Dionysius the Areopagite. The institute was founded with the assistance of the Brotherhood of St. Photius and with the blessing of Metropolitan Sergius (Stragorodsky) of Moscow.

The first dean of the institute was Vladimir Lossky.

One purpose of the institute was to provide theological education in the French language, as all classes at the St. Sergius Orthodox Theological Institute in Paris were, at the time, taught only in Russian. During the academic year 1945-1946, two members of the St. Sergius faculty, Alexander Schmemann and Constantine Andronikoff, taught at St. Denys, but the political climate of the Russian Church in Paris at the time caused them to withdraw the next year.

== Orientation ==
Although steeped in the Russian tradition from which it sprang, the institute was oriented toward the West. It has remained close to the French academic world, drawing a number of its faculty from the University of Paris, including the Sorbonne.

The first graduate of the institute to be ordained to the priesthood was Peter L'Huillier. After lecturing at the Institute for a year, he went on to later become Archbishop of New York in the Orthodox Church in America.
