= Olivier Clément =

French Eastern Orthodox theologian (1921–2009)

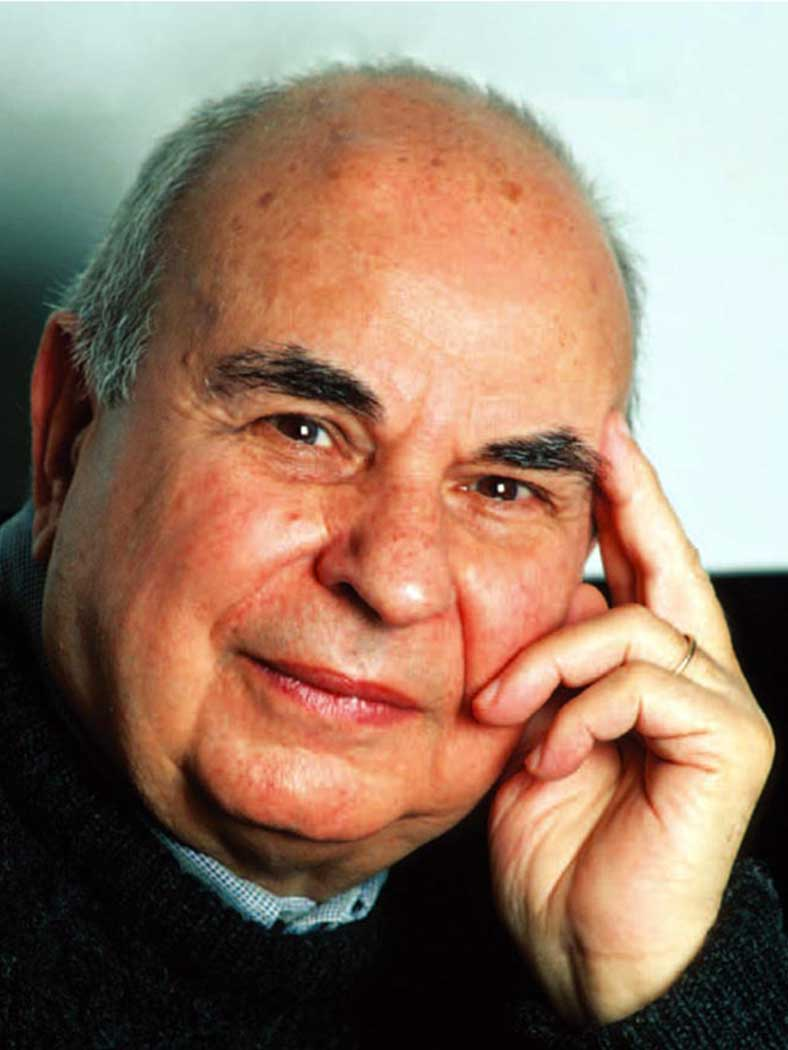
Olivier Clément

Olivier-Maurice Clément (17 November 1921 – 15 January 2009) was a French Eastern Orthodox theologian who taught at St. Sergius Orthodox Theological Institute in Paris. A friend of Pope John Paul II, he actively promoted the reunification of Christians. dialogue between Christians and people of other beliefs, and the engagement of Christian thinkers with modern thought and society.

== Biography ==
Olivier-Maurice Clement was born on 17 November 1921, into an agnostic family from the Cevennes.

He became a Christian at the age of thirty, after exploring secular beliefs as well as asian philosophy, religion, and spirituality. He had discovered, through reading the Christian philosophers Nicholas Berdyaev and Vladimir Lossky (of whom he would become a student and a friend), the thinking of the Fathers of the ancient, undivided Church, and he received baptism in the Orthodox Church, within the French-speaking diocese of the Moscow Patriarchate in Paris. He described his childhood, spiritual wanderings and conversion in his autobiography, L'Autre Soleil (The Other Sun) (ed. Stock 1986).

As a history professor, he taught at the Louis-le-Grand lyceum in Paris for a long time. As a professor of the St. Sergius Orthodox Theological Institute (Institut Saint-Serge) he became one of the most highly regarded witnesses to Orthodox Christianity, as well as one of the most prolific. He was a founder of the Orthodox Fellowship in Western Europe, and was the author of thirty books on the life, thought and history of the Orthodox Church, and their meeting with other Christians, the non-Christian religions and modernity. He was responsible for the theological journal, Contacts, and became a Doctor honoris causa at the Institute for theology in Bucharest and at the Catholic University in Louvain.

Within the scope of his teaching activities, Olivier Clement was particularly engaged in the life and testimony of the Orthodox Church in France. He also inspired the work of the Orthodox Fellowship in Western Europe from its founding in the early 1960s and participated in Orthodox Christian conferences in western Europe from 1971, when every third year Orthodox Christians from the four corners the continent would meet to pray and reflect together.

Among contemporary Orthodox theologians he was one who gave most attention to questions of modernity; which he sought to answer through a powerful and poetic reflection, rooted in the tradition of the Church as well as creative and renewing. He was an interlocutor with several great spiritual leaders of his time - Saint Sophrony of Maldon monastery in Britain, Patriarch Athenagoras, Pope John Paul II, theologian and saint Dumitru Staniloae, Brother Roger of Taizé, Andrea Riccardi, founder of the Sant'Egidio community - with all of whom he formed a relationship of trust and friendship.

Clément was also an advocate of the meta-historical fall and wrote that "holy fathers, delving into the biblical texts, showed that the Fall represented a cosmic catastrophe, an eclipse of the paradisiacal mode of being and emergence of a new mode of existence in the whole universe".

He died on 15 January 2009.

== Bibliography ==
- (Autobiography) L'autre soleil: Quelques notes d'autobiographie spirituelle (Desclée De Brouwer, 2010) ISBN 9782220061658
- Transfigurer le Temps (Delachaux & Niestlé, Paris, 1959)
  - Jeremy N. Ingpen (translator), Transfiguring Time: Understanding Time in the Light of the Orthodox Tradition (New City Press, 2019) ISBN 9781565486805
- Roots of Christian Mysticism: Texts from Patristic Era with Commentary (with Jean-Claude Barreau) (1995) ISBN 1-56548-029-5 ISBN 978-1565480292
- You Are Peter: An Orthodox Reflection on the Exercise of Papal Primacy (2003. New City Press) ISBN 1-56548-189-5 ISBN 978-1565481893
- Taizé: A Meaning to Life (Paperback) (1997. GIA publications) ISBN 1-57999-007-X ISBN 978-1579990077
- Three Prayers: The Lord's Prayer, O Heavenly King, the Prayer of Saint (2000. St. Vladimir's Seminary Press) ISBN 0-88141-197-3 ISBN 978-0881411973
- On Human Being: A Spiritual Anthropology (Theology and Faith) (2000. New City Press) ISBN 1-56548-143-7 ISBN 978-1565481435
- Dialogues Avec Le Patriarche Athenagoras (1969. Fayard) ASIN: B0010ED7ZA
- Le Chemin de Croix à Rome (O.clement) (Paperback) (1998. Desclée de Brouwer) ISBN 2-220-04252-9 ISBN 978-2220042527
- The Church of Orthodoxy (Religions of Humanity) (2002. Chelsea House Publications) ISBN 0-7910-6628-2 ISBN 978-0791066287
- Conversations With Ecumenical Patriarch Bartholomew I (1997. St. Vladimir's Seminary Press) ISBN 0-88141-178-7 ISBN 978-0881411782
- Berdiaev, un philosophe russe en France (Collection DDB) (1991. Desclee de Brouwer) ISBN 978-2-220-03236-8
- The Spirit of Solzhenitsyn (1976. Barnes & Noble Books) ISBN 0-06-491212-4 ISBN 978-0064912129
- Joie de la résurrection (Salvator, 2015) ISBN 9782706712272
- The Song of Tears: An Essay on Repentance Based on the Great Canon of St Andrew of Crete (St. Vladimir's Seminary Press, 2021) ISBN 9780881416831
- La Révolte de l'esprit (Stock, 2022) ISBN 9782234010475

== Online works ==
- Noesis The Glory of God Hidden in His Creatures
- Jesus, terre de vivants
