= Praxis (Byzantine Rite) =

Practice of the faith

Praxis, a transliteration of the Greek word πρᾶξις (derived from the stem of the verb πράσσειν, prassein "to do, to act"), means "practice, action, doing". More particularly, it means either:

1. practice, as distinguished from theory, of an art, science, etc.; or practical application or exercise of a branch of learning;
2. habitual or established practice; custom.

== Orthodoxy and orthopraxis ==
Eastern Christian writers, especially those in the Byzantine tradition, use the term "praxis" to refer to what others, using an English rather than a Greek word, call 'practice of the faith', especially with regard to ascetic and liturgical life.

Praxis is a key to understanding the Byzantine tradition, which is observed by the Eastern Orthodox Church and some Eastern Catholic Churches. This is because praxis is the basis of the understanding of faith and works as conjoint, without separating the two. The importance of praxis, in the sense of action, is indicated in the dictum of Saint Maximus the Confessor: "Theology without action is the theology of demons."

Union with God, to which Eastern Christians hold that Jesus invites mankind, requires not just faith, but correct practice of faith. This idea is found in the Scriptures (1 Cor 11:2, 2 Thes 2:14) and the Church Fathers, and is linked with the term 'praxis' in Byzantine theology and vocabulary. In the context of Orthodoxy, praxis is not mentioned opposite theology, in the sense of 'theory and practice'. Rather, it comprehends all that Orthodox do, and is considered to be 'living Orthodoxy'.

Praxis is perhaps most strongly associated with worship. "Orthopraxis" is said to mean "right glory" or "right worship", and is then synonymous with orthodoxy; only correct (or proper) practice, particularly correct worship, is understood as establishing the fulness of glory given to God. This is one of the primary purposes of liturgy (divine labor), the work of the people. Some Byzantine sources maintain that in the West, Christianity has been reduced "to intellectual, ethical or social categories," whereas right worship is fundamentally important in our relationship to God, forming the faithful into the Body of Christ and providing the path to "true religious education." A "symbiosis of worship and work" is considered to be inherent in Byzantine praxis.

Fasting, another key part of the practice of the Christian faith, is mentioned as part of Byzantine praxis, in connection with the Sermon on the Mount (Mt 6), and in comparison with the history and commemorations of Lenten fasts.

Praxis may also refer to proper religious etiquette.

== Corresponding terminology in Latin Christianity ==
In the Latin Church, parallel ideas of asceticism and worship exist. The word used in this regard is the regular English word "practice", since in English the term "praxis" is not normally used in this sense.

The simplest and most common understanding of the term "practising Catholic", a minimal interpretation of the phrase, is that the person has been baptized (or canonically received into full communion with the Catholic Church) and strives to observe the Church's precept of attending celebration of the Mass or Divine Liturgy on Sundays and holy days of obligation. Someone who does not fulfil even this minimum requirement for being considered "practising" is referred to as a lapsed Catholic.

A more ample indication of what practice involves is given in a statement by Bishop Luc Matthys of Armidale, New South Wales, Australia. Living the Catholic faith involves much more than the minimum requirements referred to above.

Matters such as fasting have applications that vary according to place and according to the autonomous particular Church to which a person belongs. In each of the Eastern Catholic Churches, practice is generally the same as in the associated Eastern Church with which it is not in full communion. Thus, practice in the Eastern Catholic Churches of Byzantine Rite is identical with that described above for the Churches that constitute the Eastern Orthodox Church, but differs from that of, for instance, the Syro-Malabar Catholic Church. Within the Latin Church too, there are variations in such matters in accordance with rules laid down by the episcopal conferences in view of local conditions and traditions.

== Modern meaning of "praxis" ==
In English, the word "praxis" is more commonly used in the sense not of practice but with the meaning given to it by Immanuel Kant, namely application of a theory to cases encountered in experience or reasoning about what there should be as opposed to what there is: this meaning Karl Marx made central to his philosophical ideal of transforming the world through revolutionary activity. Proponents of Latin American liberation theology have used the word "praxis" with specific reference to human activity directed towards transforming the conditions and causes of poverty. Their "liberation theology" consists then in applying the Gospel to that praxis to guide and govern it.

== See also ==
- Christian theological praxis
- Phronema
- Theosis (Eastern Orthodox theology)
- Theoria
