= Orthodox Theological Society in America =

The Orthodox Theological Society in America (OTSA), was organized in 1966 with the help of the Standing Conference of Canonical Orthodox Bishops in the Americas (SCOBA) as a way to promote Orthodox theology, fellowship and cooperation among Orthodox Christians. It also serves as a means to coordinate the work of Orthodox theologians in the Americas.

== Sources ==
- The Orthodox Theological Society in America - OTSA Website
