= Georges Florovsky =

Russian Orthodox theologian and historian (1893–1979)

The Reverend Georges Florovsky
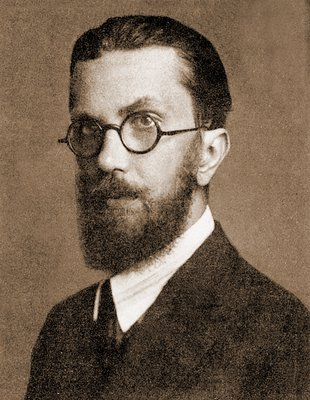
- Florovsky, c. 1920s
- Church: Eastern Orthodox Church

Personal details
- Born: Georgi Vasilievich Florovsky; September 9, 1893 Yelisavetgrad, Russian Empire (now Kropyvnytskyi, Ukraine)
- Died: August 11, 1979 (aged 85) Princeton, New Jersey, U.S.

Georges Vasilievich Florovsky (Russian: Гео́ргий Васи́льевич Флоро́вский; 9 September [O.S. 28 August] 1893 – August 11, 1979) was a Russian Orthodox priest, theologian, and historian.

Born in the Russian Empire, he spent his working life in Paris (1920–1949) and New York (1949–1979). With Sergei Bulgakov, Vladimir Lossky, Justin Popović and Dumitru Stăniloae he was one of the more influential Eastern Orthodox Christian theologians of the mid-20th century. He was particularly concerned that modern Christian theology might receive inspiration from the lively intellectual debates of the patristic traditions of the undivided Church rather than from later Scholastic or Reformation categories of thought.

== Early life ==
Georgiy Vasilievich Florovsky was born in Yelisavetgrad in the Kherson Governorate of the Russian Empire (now Kropyvnytskyi, Ukraine) on 9 September 1893, the fourth child of an Orthodox priest. He grew up in Odesa. Raised in an erudite environment, he learned English, German, French, Latin, Greek, and Hebrew while a schoolboy, and at eighteen he started to study philosophy and history. He graduated from the University of Odesa in 1916.

== Career ==
=== Career in Russia ===
After his first graduation, he taught for three years at high schools in Odesa, and then made his full graduation including the licentia docendi at all universities in the Russian Empire.

In 1919, Florovsky began to teach at the University of Odessa, but, in 1920, his family was forced to leave Russia for Sofia, Bulgaria. Florovsky realized at that time that there would be no return for him, because Marxism did not accept the history and philosophy he taught. He was part of the emigration of Russian intelligentsia, which also included Nikolai Berdyaev, Sergei Bulgakov, Nicholas Lossky and his son Vladimir Lossky, Alexander Schmemann, and John Meyendorff, the last two of whom would follow him in the United States as Dean of Saint Vladimir's Orthodox Theological Seminary in New York.

=== Work in Europe ===
In the 1920s, Florovsky had a personal and vocational friendship with the existentialist philosopher Nikolai Berdyaev, but the two became distanced later, through Berdyaev's not understanding Florovsky's ordination to the presbyterate in 1932 and because of the critical attitude to Berdyaev's philosophy of religion expressed in Florovsky's Ways of Russian Theology (1937).

In 1924, Florovsky received his M.A. in Prague. In 1925, he became professor of patristics at the St. Serge Institute of Orthodox Theology in Paris. In this subject, he found his vocation. The lively debates of the thinkers of the early Church became for him a benchmark for Christian theology and exegesis, as well as a base for his critique of the ecumenical movement, and despite his not having earned an academic degree in theology (he was later awarded several honorary degrees), he would spend the rest of his life teaching at theological institutions. In 1932, Florovsky was ordained a priest of the Eastern Orthodox Church. During the 1930s, he undertook extensive research in European libraries and published valuable patristic studies in Russian, such as his book on Eastern Fathers of the Fourth Century (1931) and The Byzantine Fathers Fifth to Eighth Centuries (1933). These were followed by his magnum opus, Ways of Russian Theology (1937). In this work, he questioned the Western Christian influences of scholasticism, pietism, and idealism on Orthodox, and especially Russian, Christian theology and called for its reformulation in the light of patristic writings. The work was received with both enthusiasm and condemnation—there was no neutral attitude to it among Russian émigrés. One of his most prominent critics was Nikolai Berdyaev. Florovsky remained professor of patristics at the Institute until 1939, and from 1939 to 1948 taught there as professor of dogmatics.

=== Dean of Saint Vladimir's seminary ===
In 1949, Florovsky moved to the United States to take a position as Dean of Saint Vladimir's Orthodox Theological Seminary in New York City. There, his development of the curriculum led to the Board of Regents of the University of the State of New York granting the Seminary an Absolute Charter in 1953.

In 1955, Florovsky was asked by his synod overseers to "lay down the deanship."

=== Later career ===
In 1956, Florovsky began teaching at Harvard Divinity School, continuing there until 1964. Then he moved to Princeton University, where he taught from 1964 to 1972. From 1962 until his death, he worked as a visiting Lecturer at Princeton Theological Seminary.

He also served as a lecturer on Eastern Orthodox thought at Columbia University, and was an adjunct professor at Union Theological Seminary.

== Death ==
He died on 11 August 1979 in Princeton due to illness. He is buried in St. Vladimir’s Orthodox Church in Trenton, New Jersey.

== Works ==
- Достоевский и Европа (Sofia, 1922)
- Россия и латинство (Berlin, 1923)
- Eastern Fathers of the Fourth Century (1931. Paris)
- Переселение душ: Проблема бессмертия в оккультизме и христианстве: Сборник статей (Paris: YMCA-Press, 1935)
- The Ways of Russian Theology (online)
  - Les Voies de la théologie russe (Paris, 1937)
  - Les voies de la théologie russe (Lausanne, L'Âge d'Homme, coll. "Sophia"), 2001
- The Catholicity of the Church online
- The Lost Scriptural Mind online
- On Church and Tradition: An Eastern Orthodox View online
- St. John Chrysostom. The Prophet of Charity online
- The Ascetic Ideal and the New Testament. Reflections on the Critique of the Theology of the Reformation online
- "The Limits of the Church," Church Quarterly Review, 1933 (online)
  - "Les limites de l’Eglise" in Вестник Русского Западно-Европейского Патриаршего Экзархата 1961.
- Following the Holy Fathers (Excerpt of The Collected Works of Georges Florovsky Vol. IV, "Patristic Theology and the Ethos of the Orthodox Church," Part II, p. 15–22) online
- St Gregory Palamas and the Tradition of the Fathers, 1961 online
- Revelation and Interpretation online
- Scripture and Tradition: an Orthodox View online
- The Work of the Holy Spirit in Revelation online
- Holy Icons online
- Collected works published 1972–1979 (vol. 1–5) in Belmont, Mass. by Nordland Pub., and 1987–1989 (vol. 6–14) in Vaduz, Europa by Büchervertriebsanstalt.
  - Collected Works. Volume 1: Bible, Church, Tradition
  - Collected Works. Volume 2: Christianity and Culture (1974) excerpts online ISBN 9780913124048
  - Collected Works. Volume 3: Creation and Redemption [excerpts online]
  - Collected Works. Volume 4: Aspects of Church History excerpts online
  - Collected Works. Volume 5: Ways of Russian Theology, Part I
  - Collected Works. Volume 6: Ways of Russian Theology, Part II
  - Collected Works. Volume 7: Eastern Fathers of the Fourth Century
    - Восточные отцы IV-го века (Paris: YMCA-press, 1990)
  - Collected Works. Volume 8: Byzantine Fathers of the Fifth Century
  - Collected Works. Volume 9: Byzantine Fathers of the Sixth to Eight Centuries
    - Восточные отцы V—VIII веков (Paris: YMCA-press, 1990)
  - Collected Works. Volume 10: Byzantine Ascetic and Spiritual Fathers
  - Collected Works. Volume 11: Theology and Literature
  - Collected Works. Volume 12: Philosophy
  - Collected Works. Volume 13: Ecumenism I: A Doctrinal Approach
  - Collected Works. Volume 14: Ecumenism II: An Historical Approach
- The Patristic Witness of Georges Florovsky: Essential Theological Writings (T&T Clark, 2020) ISBN 9780567697714
- The Cross of Loneliness: The Correspondence of Saint Sophrony & Archpriest Georges Florovsky (STM Press, 2021) ISBN 9781736172315
- Dion McLaren, editor, Bible, Church, Tradition: An Eastern Orthodox View (Crux Press, 2023) ISBN 9780473635909

== See also ==
- List of Russian philosophers
- Eastern Orthodox Christian theology
- Philosophers' ships

Academic offices
Preceded by John (Shahovskoy)	Dean of Saint Vladimir's Orthodox Theological Seminary; 1950–1955	Succeeded by Leontius (Turkevich)
