= Vladimir Lossky =

Russian Orthodox theologian (1903–1958)

- Владимир Лосский
- Born: Vladimir Nikolayevich Lossky; 8 June 1903; Göttingen, German Empire
- Died: 7 February 1958 (aged 54); Paris, France
- Spouse: Madeleine Shapiro (m. 1928)
- Children: 4
- Father: Nikolay Lossky
- Relatives: Olga Lossky (great-granddaughter)

Academic background
- Education: University of Paris (B.A., 1927)
- Academic advisor: Étienne Gilson
- Influences: Dionysius the Areopagite; Pavel Florensky; Étienne Gilson; Lev Karsavin

Academic work
- Discipline: Theology
- Sub-discipline: Dogmatic theology; mystical theology
- School or tradition: Eastern Orthodox theology
- Institutions: St. Dionysius Institute in Paris
- Notable works: The Mystical Theology of the Eastern Church (1944)
- Influenced: Rowan Williams; Christos Yannaras; John Zizioulas; John Romanides

Vladimir Nikolaievich Lossky (Note: Pronounced /ˌnɪkəˈlaɪ.əvɪtʃ ˈlɒski/.) (Russian: Владимир Николаевич Лосский; 1903–1958) was a Russian Orthodox theologian exiled in Paris. He emphasized theosis as the main principle of Eastern Orthodox Christianity.

== Biography ==
Vladimir Nikolaievich Lossky was born on 8 June (OS 26 May) 1903 in Göttingen, Germany. His father, Nikolai Lossky, was professor of philosophy in Saint Petersburg. Vladimir Nikolaievich Lossky enrolled as a student at the faculty of Arts at Petrograd University in 1919, and, in the spring of 1922, was profoundly struck when he witnessed the trial which led to the execution of Metropolitan Benjamin of St. Petersburg by the Soviets. Metropolitan Benjamin was later canonized by the Russian Orthodox Church.

In November 1922, Lossky was expelled from Soviet Russia with his entire family. From 1922 to 1926, he continued his studies in Prague, and, subsequently, at the Sorbonne in Paris, where in 1927, he graduated in medieval philosophy. He married Madeleine Shapiro on 4 June 1928.

Lossky settled in Paris in 1924. From 1942 until 1958, he was a member of the Centre National de la Recherche Scientifique. He served as the first dean of the St. Dionysius Institute in Paris. He taught dogmatic theology and ecclesiastical history in this institute until 1953, and, from 1953 to 1958, in the diocese of the patriarchate of Moscow, "rue Pétel" in Paris. He was a member of the Brotherhood Saint Photius and the ecumenical Fellowship of Saint Alban and Saint Sergius.

His best-known work is Essai sur la theologie mystique de l'Église d'orient (1944) (English translation, The Mystical Theology of the Eastern Church (1957).

Lossky died of a heart attack on 7 February 1958 in Paris.

== Personal life ==
Lossky has a great-granddaughter named Olga Lossky, who was born on 5 December 1980. She is a contemporary French writer of Russian origin.

== Theology ==
Lossky's main theological concern was exegesis of mystical theology in Christian traditions. He argued in The Mystical Theology of the Eastern Church (1944) that theologians of the Orthodox tradition maintained the mystical dimension of theology in a more integrated way than those of the Catholic and Reformed traditions after the East–West Schism because the latter misunderstood such Greek terms as ousia, hypostasis, theosis, and theoria. In illustration of his argument he cites the collection known as the Philokalia and John Climacus's Ladder of Divine Ascent, as well as works by Pseudo-Dionysius the Areopagite, Gregory of Nyssa, Basil of Caesarea, Gregory Nazianzen, and Gregory Palamas. Georges Florovsky termed Lossky's Mystical Theology of the Eastern Church a "neopatristic synthesis".

The genius of Eastern mystical theology lay, he contended, in its apophatic character, which he defined as the understanding that God is radically unknowable in human, thus philosophical, terms. Consequently, God's special revelation in Scripture must be preserved in all of its integrity by means of the distinction between the ineffable divine essence and the inaccessible nature of the Holy Trinity, on the one hand, and the positive revelation of the Trinitarian energies, on the other. "When we speak of the Trinity in itself," said Lossky, "we are confessing, in our poor and always defective human language, the mode of existence of the Father, Son, and Holy Spirit, one sole God who cannot but be Trinity, because He is the living God of Revelation, Who, though unknowable, has made Himself known, through the incarnation of the Son, to all who have received the Holy Spirit, Who proceeds from the Father and is sent into the world in the name of the incarnate Son." The Trinitarian processions in revelation thus produce the energies which human beings experience as grace and by which they are sanctified or "deified". In his Mystical Theology he argued that the theologians of the undivided Church understood that theosis was above knowledge (gnosis).

This was further clarified in his work, Vision of God (or theoria). In both works Lossky also stresses the differences between Christian thinkers such as Pseudo-Dionysius and such thinkers as Plotinus and the Neoplatonists, asserting that Christianity and Neoplatonism, though they share common culture and concepts, have very different understandings of God and ontology.

Vladimir Lossky, like his close friend Georges Florovsky, was opposed to the sophiological theories of Sergei Bulgakov and Vladimir Solovyov. In the words of Nicholas Lossky, "One characteristic of his theology that should be underscored, is that he was not, and always refused to be, a direct descendant of the famous Russian 'religious philosophy'." The term Russian religious philosophy had its origin in the works of the slavophile movement and its core concept of sobornost, which was later used and developed by Vladimir Solovyov.

=== The Economy of the Holy Spirit ===
Lossky articulates a distincte role of the Holy Spirit post-Pentecost, the Economy of the Holy Spirit (cf. ch. 8, The Mystical Theology of the Eastern Church). He interprets Ephesians 1:22ff (the church is [Jesus'] body; the fullness of him who fills everything in every way) stating that "if Christ is 'head of the church which is his body,' the Holy Spirit is He 'that filleth all in all'" meaning that while particular believers of Jesus are members of the corporate Christ which relating only to portions of the entire Christ, instead touching and relating only to particular 'parts of the body,' they however receive the Holy Spirit in fullness as opposed to part. Simultaneously, humans find themselves "reunited in the hypostasis of Christ, if it is an 'enhypostatized' nature - one existing in an hypostasis [in this case Jesus'] - the human persons who form the hypostasis of this unified nature are not suppressed."

== Eastern theological definitions ==
Lossky argued in The Mystical Theology of the Eastern Church that the technical terms of the Trinity doctrine are rooted in Hebrew hermeneutics, Greek Platonic philosophy and Neoplatonic philosophy. In his theology, God is triune but has only one essence, which is reflective of mankind hypostatically, inside out. In much Eastern Orthodox theology, ousia, as essence or being, is the aspect of God that is completely incomprehensible to mankind and human perception, since it is understood to be beyond the created world, i.e. uncreated. The essence of God, being in the Father (primordial origin) and then given to the Son (begotten of the Father not made) and the Holy Spirit (which proceeds from the Father) both as the hands of God. Ousia as essence or being, defined as "all that subsists by itself and which has not its being in another." God and experience enter into a person from the external world and into the soul by the influence of the Holy Spirit. The free will of man functions as a means to choose God or reject God, which would amount, in many Christian views, to blasphemy against the Holy Spirit.

=== Triune God in essence is the only uncreated being ===
The concept of the Triune God being a single God in essence or Ousia (as uncreated). A single God who as Father or infinite origin is an existence, as Son or flesh is an existence and as Spirit is an existence. One God in one Father.

=== God the Father ===
The Father of the Trinity is uncreated hyper-being (beyond being) in essence or ousia as such is the truly infinite, primordial or original, uncreated origin, the reality of which all things and beings originate from, as the Father Hypostasis. The Father hypostasis in using the term God is used primarily as the name for God. As the term God is interchangeable with the term Father. As Jesus Christ is the Son of God, Son of the Father and the Holy Spirit is the Spirit of God, the Spirit of the Father.

=== God the Son ===
The Son of God or Jesus Christ expressing the logos or perfection as the highest ideal, in the material world and God in the flesh. Christ as well, representing mankind, which he inherited from the Theotokos. Christ manifest as generated and or begotten (not made) in essence uncreated, by and from God the Father (Note: John of Damascus wrote: Whatsoever the Son has from the Father, the Spirit also has, including His very being. And if the Father does not exist, then neither does the Son and the Spirit; and if the Father does not have something, then neither has the Son or the Spirit. Furthermore, because of the Father, that is, because the Father is, the Son and the Spirit are; and because of the Father, the Son and the Spirit have everything that they have.) as another reality, Hypostasis of God.

=== God the Holy Spirit ===
The Holy Spirit himself being light, life, animation and the source of the uncreated light photomos or divine illumination, who proceeds or is manifest by procession from God the Father as another Hypostasis of God. The Holy Spirit and the Christ being the hands of God the Father, reaching in from the infinite into the finite (Note: Irenaeus wrote: "Now man is a mixed organization of soul and flesh, who was formed after the likeness of God, and moulded by His hands, that is, by the Son and Holy Spirit, to whom also He said, 'Let Us make man.'") (see Irenaeus).

=== Created being ===
All things that are not God are created beings or are created in their essence. Mankind possesses free will in his finite nature, mankind exists in an indeterminate world. Things as such in their subsistence, are dependent upon something other than themselves. As such divine beings (such as Angels) are created beings the origin of their being is ex nihilo. All things that are not God, are created in essence or being. God as hyper-being, and or in essence uncreated can be, by way of his existences, the infinite while generating himself as a man and also be the spirit, that by procession (from him God, Father), animates life.

=== Energies of God ===
All three hypostasis sharing a common essence or ousia or being, which is referred to as God. The ousia of God being completely unknowable or incomprehensible to mankind since it is uncreated whereas nothingness as well as mankind are created (see Nikolai Berdyaev). The energies of God the Father having the same hyper-being in that they are without cause and or uncreated (see Gregory Palamas). God's energies as uncreated and indestructible. God the Father (the Father as the monarchos) in his being is not self generated, nor generated from any other, hence the incomprehensibility of God. The Trinity having existences (hypostasis) that are comprehensible, but a being that is not created and beyond all things (including nothingness) therefore God's hyper-being (ousia) is incomprehensible. Lossky points out that God's existences can be spoken of but not his being. If one then speaks of God's essence or being as anything outside of incomprehensible, one speaks in direct contradiction to the theoria of Christianity and as such are not true theologians and are instead speaking of God through speculations, rather than experience.

== Mysticism and theology ==
For Lossky, Christian mysticism and dogmatic theology were one and the same. According to Lossky mysticism is Orthodox dogma par excellence. The Christian life of prayer and worship is the foundation for dogmatic theology, and the dogma of the church help Christians in their struggle for sanctification and deification. Without dogma future generations lose the specific orthodoxy (right mind) and orthopraxis (right practice) of the Eastern Orthodox path to salvation (see soteriology).

== Bibliography ==
- "The Dispute about Sophia" [Споръ о Софіи : "Докладная записка" прот. С. Булгакова и смыслъ Указа Московской патриархіи] (1936)
- Sept jours sur les routes de France: Juin 1940 Cerf (1998) ISBN 2-204-06041-0
- Essai sur la théologie mystique de l'Église d'Orient (1944) (English translation, The Mystical Theology of the Eastern Church; 1957, reprinted many times) ISBN 0-913836-31-1; ISBN 0-227-67919-9
  - Lossky, Vladimir (1957). The Mystical Theology of the Eastern Church (1. ed.). London: James Clarke and Co Ltd. ISBN 9780227675366.
  - Lossky, Vladimir (1976) [1957]. The Mystical Theology of the Eastern Church. Crestwood: Saint Vladimir's Seminary Press. ISBN 9780913836316.
  - Lossky, Vladimir (2005) [1957]. The Mystical Theology of the Eastern Church. Cambridge: James Clarke and Co Ltd. ISBN 9780227905098.
- Theologie Negative et Connaissance de Dieu Chez Maitre Eckhart (1960; Vrin, 2002) ISBN 2-7116-0507-8
- La Vision de Dieu (1961) (English translation, The Vision of God; 1964, repr. several times) ISBN 0-913836-19-2
  - Lossky, Vladimir (1964). The Vision of God. London: Faith Press.
- Lossky, Vladimir (1974). In the Image and Likeness of God. Crestwood: Saint Vladimir's Seminary Press. ISBN 9780913836132.
- Lossky, Vladimir (1978). Orthodox Theology: An Introduction. Crestwood: Saint Vladimir's Seminary Press. ISBN 9780913836439.
- (with Leonid Ouspensky) The Meaning of Icons (1947; 2nd. ed. 1999 Saint Vladimir's Seminary Press) ISBN 0-913836-99-0
- Seven Days on the Roads of France, June 1940 (Saint Vladimir's Seminary Press, 2012) ISBN 9780881414189
- Orthodox Dogmatic Theology: Creation, God's Image in Man, & the Redeeming Work of the Trinity (Saint Vladimir's Seminary Press, 2017) ISBN 0881415421
- Eckhart's Apophatic Theology: Knowing the Unknowable God (James Clarke and Co Ltd, 2024) ISBN 9780227179758

== See also ==
- Hesychasm
- Apotheosis
- John Behr
- John of Saint-Denis
- Theophany
- Michael Pomazansky
- John S. Romanides
- Phronema
- Uniatism
- Archimandrite Sophrony
- John Meyendorff
- Dumitru Stăniloae
- Olivier Clément
- Henri Bergson
- Rowan Williams
- Fellowship of Saint Alban and Saint Sergius
