= Theosis (Eastern Christian theology) =

Likeness to or union with God

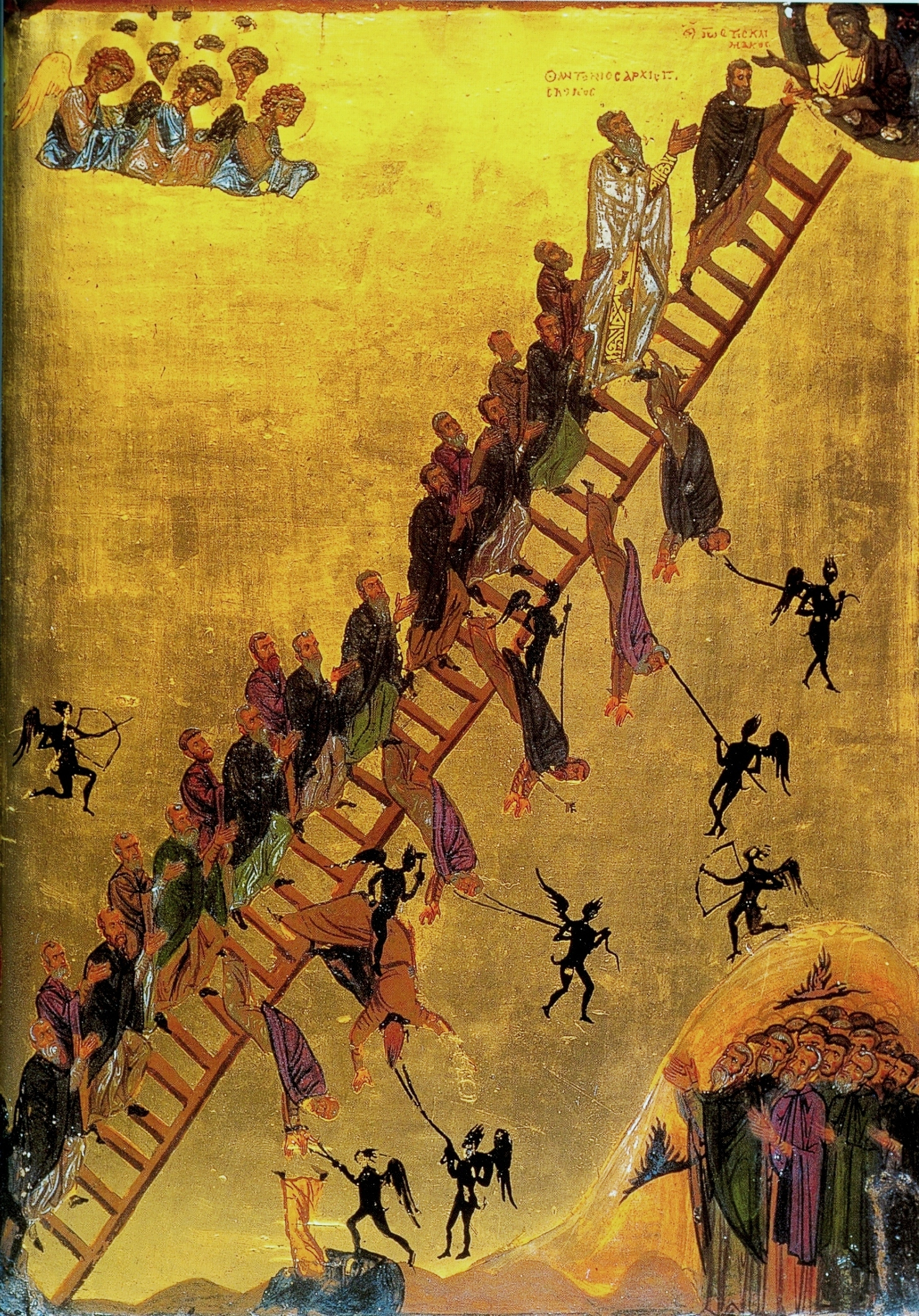
Eastern Orthodox icon of The Ladder of Divine Ascent (the steps toward theosis as described by John Climacus), showing Christian monks ascending to Jesus Christ and falling from the ladder. Currently preserved in the Monastery of Saint Catherine, Mount Sinai, Egypt.

Theosis (Ancient Greek: θέωσις), or deification (deification may also refer to apotheosis, lit. "making divine"), is a transformative process whose aim is likeness to or union with God, as taught by the Eastern Orthodox Church and the Eastern Catholic Churches; a similar concept is also found in the Latin Church of the Catholic Church, where it is termed "divinization". As a process of transformation, theosis is brought about by the effects of catharsis (purification of mind and body) and theoria ('illumination' with the 'vision' of God). According to Eastern Christian teachings, theosis is very much the purpose of human life. It is considered achievable only through synergy (or cooperation) of human activity and God's uncreated energies (or operations).

According to Metropolitan Hierotheos (Vlachos), the primacy of theosis in Eastern Orthodox Christian theology is directly related to the fact that Byzantine theology (as historically conceived by its principal exponents) is based to a greater extent than Latin Catholic theology on the direct spiritual insights of the saints or mystics of the church, in contrast to the traditions of the West which place a greater emphasis on perceived rationality. Byzantine Christians consider that "no one who does not follow the path of union with God can be a theologian" in the proper sense. Thus theology in Byzantine Christianity is not treated primarily as an academic pursuit. Instead it is based on applied revelation (see gnosiology), and the primary validation of a theologian is understood to be a holy and ascetical life rather than intellectual training or academic credentials (see scholasticism).

== Deification ==
Athanasius of Alexandria wrote, "He was incarnate that we might be made god" (Αὐτὸς γὰρ ἐνηνθρώπησεν, ἵνα ἡμεῖς θεοποιηθῶμεν). What would otherwise seem absurd—that fallen, sinful man may become holy as God is holy—has been made possible through Jesus Christ, who is God incarnate. However, every being and reality itself is considered as composed of the immanent energy, or energeia, of God. As energy is the actuality of God, i.e. his immanence, from God's being, it is also the energeia or activity of God. Thus the doctrine avoids pantheism while partially accepting Neoplatonism's terms and general concepts, its substance (see Plotinus).

Maximus the Confessor wrote:

A sure warrant for looking forward with hope to deification of human nature is provided by the Incarnation of God, which makes man God to the same degree as God Himself became man. ...Let us become the image of the one whole God, bearing nothing earthly in ourselves, so that we may consort with God and become gods, receiving from God our existence as gods. For it is clear that He Who became man without sin (cf. Heb. 4:15) will divinize human nature without changing it into the Divine Nature, and will raise it up for His Own sake to the same degree as He lowered Himself for man's sake. This is what St[.] Paul teaches mystically when he says, "that in the ages to come he might display the overflowing richness of His grace". (Eph. 2:7)

== Theoria ==
Through theoria (illumination with or direct experience of the Triune God), human beings come to know and experience what it means to be fully human, i.e., the created image of God; through their communion with Jesus Christ, God shares himself with the human race, in order to conform them to all that he is in knowledge, righteousness, and holiness. As God became human, in all ways except sin, he will also make humans "God", i.e., "holy" or "saintly", in all ways except his Divine Essence, which is uncaused and uncreated. Irenaeus explained this doctrine in the work Against Heresies, Book 5, Preface: "the Word of God, our Lord Jesus Christ, Who, through His transcendent love, became what we are, that He might bring us to be even what He is Himself."

== As a patristic and historical teaching ==
For many Church Fathers, theosis goes beyond simply restoring people to their state before the fall of Adam and Eve, teaching that because Christ united the human and divine natures in Jesus' person, it is now possible for someone to experience closer fellowship with God than Adam and Eve initially experienced in the Garden of Eden, and that people can become more like God than Adam and Eve were at that time. Some Byzantine Christian theologians say that Jesus would have become incarnate for this reason alone, even if Adam and Eve had never sinned.

All of humanity is fully restored to its full potential because the Son of God took to himself a human nature to be born of a woman, and takes to himself also the sufferings due to sin (yet is not himself sinful, and is God unchanged in being). In Christ the two natures of God and man are not two persons but one; thus a union is effected in Christ between all of humanity in principle and God. So the holy God and sinful humanity are reconciled in principle in the one sinless man, Jesus Christ. (See Jesus' prayer as recorded in John 17.)

This reconciliation is made actual through the struggle to conform to the image of Christ. Without the struggle, the praxis, there is no real faith; faith leads to action, without which it is dead. One must unite one’s will, thought, and action to the will, thoughts, and actions of God. Christians must fashion their lives to be a mirror, a true likeness of God. More than that, since God and man are more than a similarity in Christ but rather a true union, Christians’ lives are more than mere imitation and are rather a union with the life of God himself:

"If then there is any encouragement in Christ, any consolation from love, any sharing in the Spirit, any compassion and sympathy, for it is God who is at work in you, enabling you both to will and to work for his good pleasure." (Philippians 2:13)

A common analogy for theosis, given by the Greek fathers, is that of a metal which is put into the fire. The metal obtains all the properties of the fire (heat, light), while its essence remains that of a metal. Using the head-body analogy from Paul the Apostle, everyone in whom Christ lives partakes of the glory of Christ. As John Chrysostom observes, “where the head is, there is the body also. There is no interval to separate between the Head and the body; for were there a separation, then were it no longer a body, then were it no longer a head.”

== Stages ==
Theosis is understood to have three stages: first, the purgative way, purification, or katharsis; second, illumination, the illuminative way, the vision of God, or theoria; and third, sainthood, the unitive way, or theosis. Thus the term “theosis” describes the whole process and its objective. By means of purification a person comes to theoria and then to theosis. Theosis is the participation of the person in the life of God. According to this doctrine, the holy life of God, given in Jesus Christ to the believer through the Holy Spirit, is expressed through the three stages of theosis, beginning in the struggles of this life, increasing in the experience of knowledge of God, and consummated in the resurrection of the believer, when the victory of God over fear, sin, and death, accomplished in the crucifixion and resurrection of Jesus Christ, is made manifest in the believer forever.

== Ascetic practice ==
The journey toward theosis includes many forms of praxis, the most obvious are monasticism and the liturgical and sacramental life of the Church. Of the monastic tradition, the practice of hesychasm is most important as a way to establish a direct relationship with God. Living in the community of the church and partaking regularly of the sacraments, especially the Eucharist, is taken for granted. Also important is cultivating “prayer of the heart,” and prayer that never ceases, as Paul exhorts in 1 Thessalonians 5:17. This unceasing prayer of the heart is a dominant theme in the writings of the Fathers, especially in those collected in the Philokalia. It is considered that no one can reach theosis without an impeccable Christian living, crowned by faithful, warm, and ultimately silent, continuous Prayer of the Heart.

The "doer" in deification is the Holy Spirit, with whom the human being joins his will to receive this transforming grace by praxis and prayer, and as Gregory Palamas teaches, the Christian mystics are deified as they become filled with the Light of Tabor of the Holy Spirit in the degree that they make themselves open to it by asceticism (divinization being not a one-sided act of God, but a loving cooperation between God and the advanced Christian, which Palamas considers a synergy).

This synergeia or co-operation between God and man does not lead to mankind being absorbed into the Godhead as was taught in earlier pagan forms of deification like henosis. Rather it expresses unity, in the complementary nature between the created and the Creator. Acquisition of the Holy Spirit is key as the acquisition of the Spirit leads to self-realization.

== Western attitudes ==
Western attitudes have traditionally been negative, not towards divinization itself (which is also part of the doctrine of the Roman Catholic Church), but towards the ways in which divinization is supposed to happen according to Byzantine theology. In his article, Bloor highlights various Western theologians who have contributed to what he calls a "stigma" towards theosis. Yet, recent theological discourse has seen a reversal of this, with Bloor drawing upon Western theologians from an array of traditions, who, he claims, embrace theosis/deification.

The practice of ascetic prayer, called Hesychasm in the Eastern Orthodox Church and Byzantine Catholic Churches, “is centered on the enlightenment or deification (... or theosis, in Greek) of man”.

Hesychasm is directed to a goal that is not limited to natural life alone and goes beyond this to deification (theosis).

In the past, Roman Catholic theologians generally expressed a negative view of Hesychasm. The doctrine of Gregory Palamas won almost no following in the West, and the distrustful attitude of Barlaam in its regard prevailed among Western theologians, surviving into the early 20th century, as shown in Adrian Fortescue's article on hesychasm in the 1910 Catholic Encyclopedia. Fortescue translated the Greek words ἥσυχος and ἡσυχαστής as "quiet" and "quietist".

In the same period, Edward Pace's article on quietism indicated that, while in the strictest sense quietism is a 17th-century doctrine proposed by Miguel de Molinos, the term is also used more broadly to cover both Indian religions and what Edward Pace called "the vagaries of Hesychasm", thus betraying the same prejudices as Fortescue with regard to hesychasm; and, again in the same period, Siméon Vailhé described some aspects of the teaching of Palamas as "monstrous errors", "heresies" and "a resurrection of polytheism", and called the hesychast method for arriving at perfect contemplation "no more than a crude form of auto-suggestion".

Different concepts of "natural contemplation" existed in the East and in the medieval West. (Note: John Meyendorff wrote: The debate between Barlaam and the hesychasts can probably be best understood in the light of their different interpretations of what St. Maximus the Confessor used to call "natural contemplation" (physikē theōria) or the new state of creative being in Christ. Barlaam – and also medieval Latin tradition – tends to understand this created habitus as a condition for and not a consequence of grace. Palamas, on the contrary, proclaims the overwhelming novelty of the Kingdom of God revealed in Christ, and the gratuitous nature of the divine and saving acts of God. Hence, for him, vision of God cannot depend on human "knowledge".)

The twentieth century saw a remarkable change in the attitude of Roman Catholic theologians to Palamas, a "rehabilitation" of him that has led to increasing parts of the Western Church considering him a saint, even if uncanonized. Some Western scholars maintain that there is no conflict between Palamas's teaching and Roman Catholic thought. According to G. Philips, the essence–energies distinction is "a typical example of a perfectly admissible theological pluralism" that is compatible with the Roman Catholic magisterium. Jeffrey D. Finch claims that "the future of East–West rapprochement appears to be overcoming the modern polemics of neo-scholasticism and neo-Palamism". Some Western theologians have incorporated the theology of Palamas into their own thinking.

Pope John Paul II said Catholics should be familiar with "the venerable and ancient tradition of the Eastern Churches", so as to be nourished by it. Among the treasures of that tradition he mentioned in particular:

the teaching of the Cappadocian Fathers on divinization [which] passed into the tradition of all the Byzantine Churches and is part of their common heritage. This can be summarized in the thought already expressed by Saint Irenaeus at the end of the second century: God passed into man so that man might pass over to God. This theology of divinization remains one of the achievements particularly dear to Byzantine Christian thought.

Some Lutherans argue that theosis is compatible with Lutheran theology.

== See also ==
- Apotheosis
- Beatific vision
- Christian perfection
- Christian universalism
- Consecration
- Divine filiation
- Eastern Orthodox Christian theology
- Exaltation (Mormonism)
- Glorification
- Hermit
- Holiness movement
- John of the Cross
- Vladimir Lossky
- Mysticism
- Poustinia
- Sanctification
- Soteriology
