= Michael Pomazansky =

Russian theologian

- Title: Protopresbyter

Personal life
- Born: November 19 [O.S. November 7] 1888 Koryst, Volhynia, Russian Empire
- Died: November 4, 1988 (aged 99) Jordanville, New York, United States of America
- Notable work: Orthodox Dogmatic Theology (1983)

Religious life
- Religion: Eastern Orthodoxy
- Church: Russian Orthodox Church Outside of Russia
- Ordination: 1936

Protopresbyter Michael Ivanovich Pomazansky (Russian: Михаи́л Ива́нович Помаза́нский; November 19 [O.S. November 7] 1888 – November 4, 1988) was a Russian theologian of the Russian Orthodox Church.

== Biography ==
He was born in the village of Koryst, in the governorate of Volhynia. His father was Archpriest Ioann Pomazansky who was the son of Father Ioann Ambrosievich. Fr. Michael's mother, Vera Grigorievna, was the daughter of a protodeacon and later priest in the city of Zhitomir. From 1920 until 1934, Fr. Michael taught Russian philology, literature, philosophical dialectics, and Latin at the Russian lycée in Rivne.

In 1936, Fr. Michael was ordained a priest and moved to Warsaw where he was the first assistant to the rector, a position he held until June 1944.

Upon his arrival in America in 1949, Fr. Michael was appointed by Archbishop Vitaly (Maximenko) as an instructor at Holy Trinity Orthodox Seminary in Jordanville, New York. After the death of his wife, he moved into the monastery, where he remained until his death on November 4, 1988.

Father Michael Pomazansky was known for his adherence to the teaching of dogmatic theology as a way to maintain understanding and unity within the various Orthodox communities. The work that he is most remembered for indeed named after this percept: Orthodox Dogmatic Theology.

== Works ==
- Orthodox Dogmatic Theology: A Concise Exposition (1963).

== Bibliography ==
- Orthodox Dogmatic Theology: A Concise Exposition by Protopresbyter Michael Pomazansky, St Herman of Alaska Brotherhood Press, 1994 (ISBN 0938635-69-7)

== See also ==
- Glorification
- Seraphim Rose
- Vladimir Lossky
- Eucharistic theologies contrasted
- Consecration
- Canonization
- Dumitru Stăniloae
