= Lataste =

Lastaste is a surname. Notable people with the name include:

- Alcide-Vital Lataste (1832–1869), French Roman Catholic priest
- Fernand Lataste (1847–1934), French zoologist
- Jacques Lataste (1922–2011), French fencer
- Marie Lataste (1822–1847), French Roman Catholic nun and writer
- Thierry Lataste (b. 1954), senior French civil servant
