= Mimbaste =

- Commune
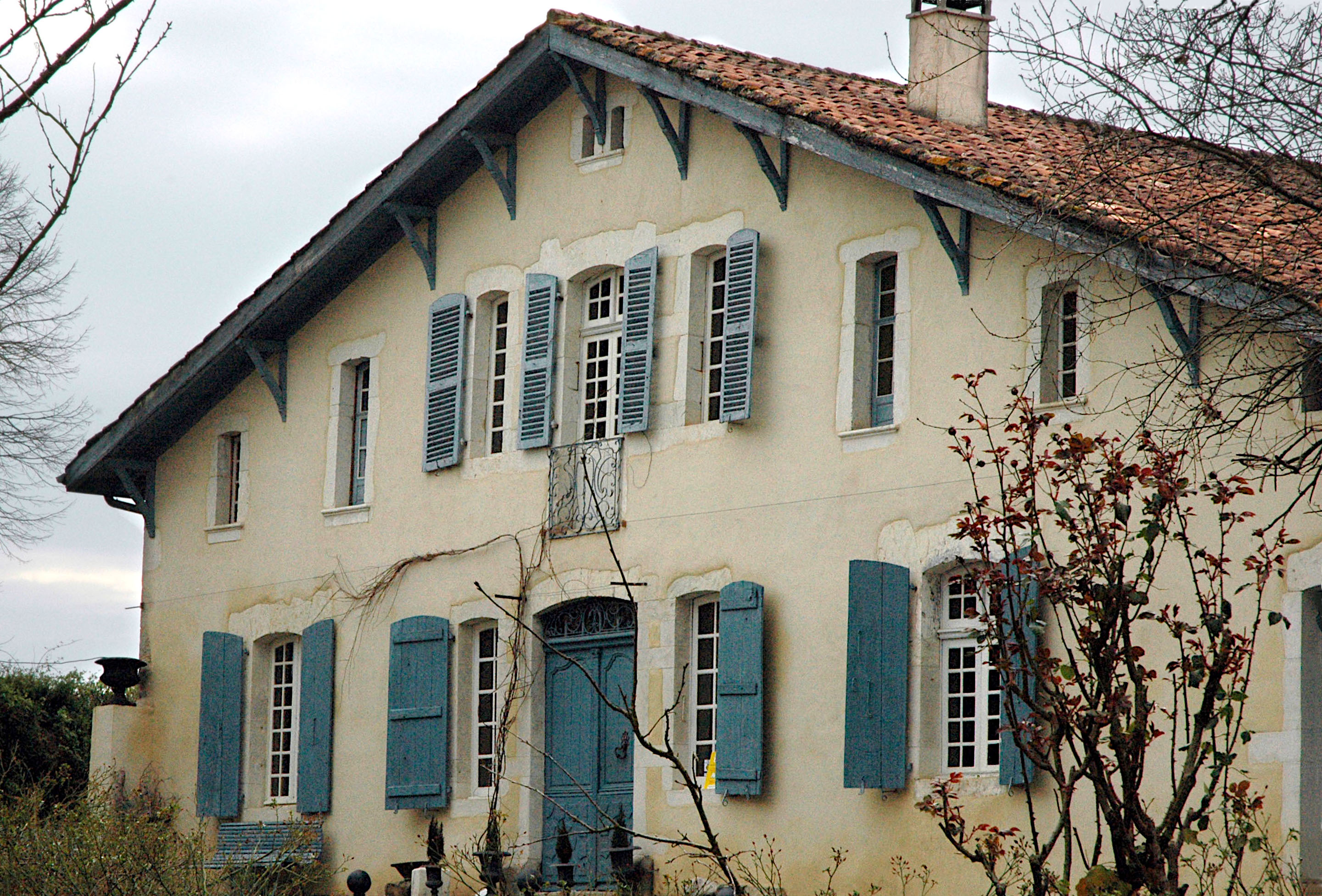
- A house in Mimbaste
- Location of Mimbaste
- Location within France Location within Nouvelle-Aquitaine
- Coordinates: 43°38′58″N 0°58′19″W
- Country: France
- Region: Nouvelle-Aquitaine
- Department: Landes
- Arrondissement: Dax
- Canton: Orthe et Arrigans
- Intercommunality: Pays d'Orthe et Arrigans

Government
  - Mayor (2020–2026): Lionel Bargeles
- Area^{1}: 20.6 km^{2} (8.0 sq mi)
- Elevation: 26 m (85 ft)
- Highest elevation: 72 m (236 ft)
- Lowest elevation: 5 m (16 ft)
- Population (2023): 1,001
  - Density: 48.6/km^{2} (126/sq mi)
- Time zone: UTC+01:00 (CET)
  - Summer (DST): UTC+02:00 (CEST)
- INSEE/Postal code: 40183 /40350
- ^{1} French Land Register data, which excludes lakes, ponds, glaciers > 1 km^{2} (0.386 sq mi or 247 acres) and river estuaries.

Mimbaste (French pronunciation: [mɛ̃bast]; Occitan: Mimbasta) is a commune in the Landes department in Nouvelle-Aquitaine in south-western France.

It was the birthplace of Catholic visionary Marie Lataste.

== See also ==
- Communes of the Landes department
