= Alcide-Vital Lataste =

French Catholic priest

Blessed Alcide-Vital Lataste OP
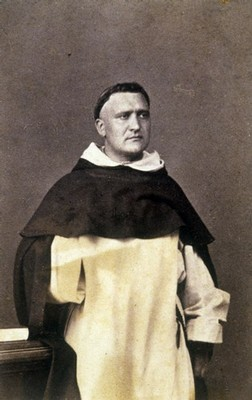
- Born: 5 September 1832; Cadillac-sur-Garonne, Gironde, French Kingdom
- Died: 10 March 1869 (aged 36); Frasne-le-Château, Haute-Saône, Second French Empire
- Venerated in: Roman Catholic Church
- Beatified: 3 June 2012, Besançon, France by Cardinal Angelo Amato
- Feast: 5 September

Alcide-Vital Lataste, OP (5 September 1832 – 10 March 1869), religious name Marie Jean Joseph Lataste, was a French Catholic priest of the Dominican Order. He established the Dominican Sisters of Bethany in 1867 in order to work with the women who were abused or were from prisons. They aimed to spread the merciful love of Jesus Christ to these women.

Pope Benedict XVI approved a healing determined to be a miracle attributed to his intercession and delegated Cardinal Angelo Amato to preside over the beatification in France.

== Life ==
Alcide-Vital Lataste was born on 5 September, 1832, in Gironde to his father Vital who lived during the French Revolution and his mother Jeanne. He had two siblings: Rosy and Onorato.

Lataste commenced his studies for the priesthood but grew fearful of such a life and exited. He met Cecilia de Saint-Germain and the two began to date each other. But, at the behest of his father, he stopped seeing her. The death of his former girlfriend not long after helped deepen his vocation to the consecrated life in the form of the Order of Preachers. He entered the order at the age of 25 and was ordained to the priesthood on 8 1863. He assumed the new name of "Jean-Joseph". It was around the time he entered the order that he decided to become a member of the Saint Vincent de Paul Society.

Following a sermon he delivered in a female prison in Cadillac, Gironde on 14 September 1864 he felt that the Lord called him to establish a religious congregation to cater to the needs of women who left prisons or who were abused. In 1865 he started to formulate ideas in order to begin this mammoth task and he recruited prospective members for this new institution on 14 August 1866. He established the order in 1867. He became aware on 19 March 1866 that the name of Saint Joseph was not included in the mass so he decided to petition Pope Pius IX to do so – the latter did this in 1870.

Lataste died on 10 March 1869 after singing the Salve Regina.

== Beatification ==
The beatification process commenced in Besançon and granted him the posthumous title of Servant of God. The first process spanned from 1937 until 1938 and a second was later held. Theologians approved Lataste's spiritual writings on 28 February 1940. Both processes were ratified on 3 April 1992. The Positio – documentation on his life of heroic virtue was submitted in two parts to the Congregation for the Causes of Saints in Rome in 1996 and 1998.

Pope Benedict XVI approved that he lived a virtuous life and proclaimed him to be Venerable on 1 June 2007.

The miracle required for beatification was investigated for two weeks in 1998 and was ratified on 28 October 2005. Benedict XVI approved it on 27 June 2011 thus allowing for his beatification to be celebrated. Cardinal Angelo Amato beatified him on 3 June 2012 on behalf of the pope.
