= Domenico da Cese =

Stigmatist friar who was a member of the Capuchin order

Domenico da Cese (27 March 1905 – 17 September 1978), born Emidio Petracca, was a priest and Cappuchin friar. His beatification process commenced on 3 March 2015 and the friar has been declared venerable.

== Life ==
Domenico da Cese was born as Emidio Petracca in Cese in the Kingdom of Italy as a son of peasants, Giovanni Petracca and Caterina Tuccere. At the age of 3, he was surprisingly cured from polio, after his parents prayed the Our Lady of Graces, to whom they consecrated him; the recovery was considered a miracle.

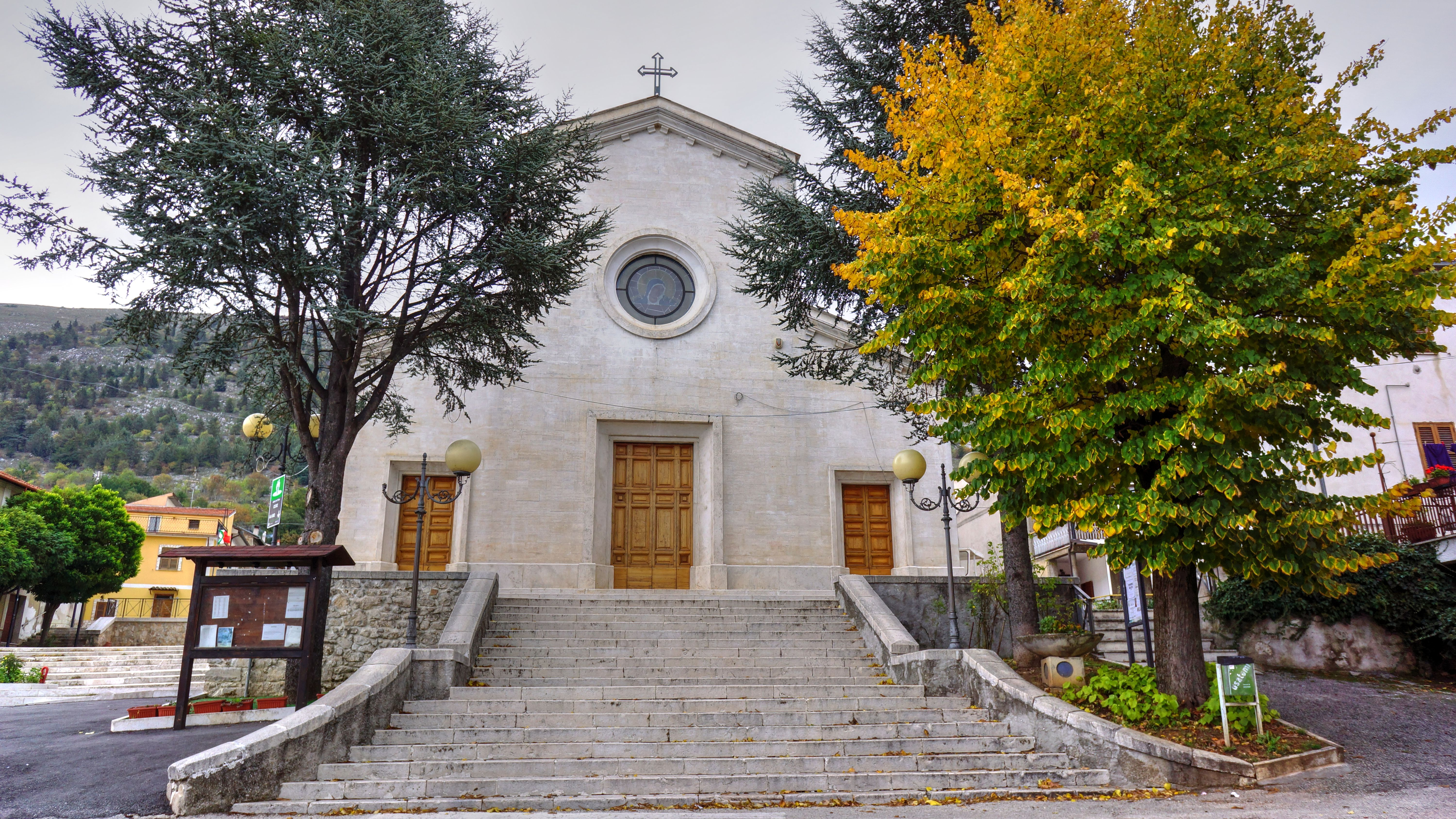
The rebuilt church of Cese, which was totally destroyed by the earthquake in 1915.

On 12 January 1915 at the age of nine while at school, he called out in class to his peers that there was going to be an earthquake that would strike that night; he was correct in this. He and his father were almost killed when their church collapsed on top of them. Of the 1300 inhabitants of Cese, only 230 survived.

In 1921, Emilio joined the Capuchin convent in Abruzzo, which he wanted to do since 1917. He studied at the Collegio Serafico. For his novitiate he was sent to Penne, where he took the religious name Domenico. According to the tradition of the Italian Capuchins the name of the place of birth is added to the names of the religious to distinguish them from other brothers of that name. Fr. Domenico da Cese made his solemn vows in 1928 and was ordained a priest in Sulmona on 11 October 1931.

The following decades he spent in the convents of Sulmona, L'Aquila, Avezzano, Luco dei Marsi, Trasacco, Campli and Caramanico. On November 19, 1940 he went to San Giovanni where he met Pio of Pietrelcina and became a close friend of him. Like Pio of Pietrelcina, Domenico da Cese was considered to have borne the stigmata.

On September 30, 1964 Father Domenico was transferred to the convent of Caramanico, in Pescara, and there he had his first contact with the shroud of the Holy Face of Manoppello. From that moment on, Father Domenico was committed to the devotion to the Holy Face of Manoppello. He succeeded practically alone in bringing to the attention of the world and of history to the veil preserved in the Sanctuary of Manoppello in Abruzzo, after centuries of oblivion. People from all over Italy traveled to receive the sacrament of penance and the Eucharist from Father Domenico, his apostolate reached thousands of faithful. Father Domenico became a believer and proponent of the Holy Face of Manoppello, eventually getting permission to live near the image in 1965.

On 12 September 1978, when in Turin to visit the Shroud of Turin, Father Domenico was hit by a young car driver and died due to his injuries on 17 September. He was buried in his hometown of Cese.

== Beatification process ==
In early 2009, the Archbishop of Chieti, Bruno Forte, initiated the beginning of a beatification process for Father Domenico, which opened on July 27, 2013. On March 3, 2015, after the diocesan proceedings in Turin and Chieti had been completed, the Congregation for the Causes of Saints announced that there was nothing to prevent the opening of the process of beatification at the Holy See (nihil obstat). In March 2016, Father Domenico was declared venerable after being awarded the heroic degree of virtue.
