= Marie Lataste =

Personal life
- Born: 21 February 1822 Mimbaste, France
- Died: 10 May 1847 (aged 25) Begasson, France
- Home town: Mimbaste
- Parents: François Lataste (father); Elisabeth Pourlet (mother)

Religious life
- Religion: Catholicism
- Order: Society of the Sacred Heart

Marie Lataste (21 February 1822 at Mimbaste near Dax, Landes, France – 10 May 1847 at Rennes) was a French Roman Catholic nun and visionary. A peasant girl with minimal formal education, she wrote two lengthy volumes describing teachings which she said Jesus had revealed to her in a vision, and which were published after heavy editing by her spiritual advisor. These books were briefly popular due to their apparent prediction of the 1870 fall of the Papal States, and influenced the writings of poet Gerard Manley Hopkins.

== Life ==
=== Childhood ===
Marie Lataste was the youngest child of François Lataste and Elisabeth Pourlet, Catholic peasants living in the village of Mimbaste. Her accounts of her own childhood describe her as intelligent and ambitious, but withdrawn and short-tempered. Her formal education was minimal, although her family owned a number of books, and she was able to borrow others from local priests.

Upon making her first Communion at the age of 11, Lataste experienced a strong impression of divine presence. About a year after, while attending Mass, she saw a bright light during the Elevation of the Host, and experienced intense love for God in the Eucharist.

During her teenage years, Lataste struggled with scrupulosity, frequently turning to her sister Marguerite for advice. She was more reluctant to speak to her sister about her struggles with lust, instead asking her spiritual director for permission to make a permanent vow of chastity. Due to her age, he refused, although he eventually allowed her to make yearly temporary vows.

At the same time, Lataste was cultivating an intense Eucharistic devotion and love for the tabernacle. Towards the end of 1839, when she was seventeen, she describes seeing Jesus appear to her on the altar, surrounded by angels. This experience was repeated intermittently until the feast of the Epiphany in 1840, and daily at the moment of the elevation for the three years following. Lataste reported that these visions instructed her both in Catholic theology and in mental prayer.

Lataste kept her experiences private, telling only her confessor, a Father Farbos. In 1841, Farbos was replaced as curé of Mimbaste by Pierre Darbins, whom Lataste also told of her visions. Darbins had her also inform the director of the seminary of Dax, Father Dupérier, and the two men became Lataste's spiritual advisors.

=== Society of the Sacred Heart ===
Lataste wished for many years to join the Society of the Sacred Heart, and expressed this desire to Darbins from 1841 onward. Her parents, who had struggled to afford the dowry for her older sister Quitterie to become a choir nun with the Sisters of Charity fourteen years before, had difficulty in raising the funds they expected her to need. Her spiritual directors were also concerned about whether Lataste, who had never left her home village, would be able to safely make the trip to Paris. Eventually, however, Lataste obtained their permission, and on 21 April 1844 she left for Paris.

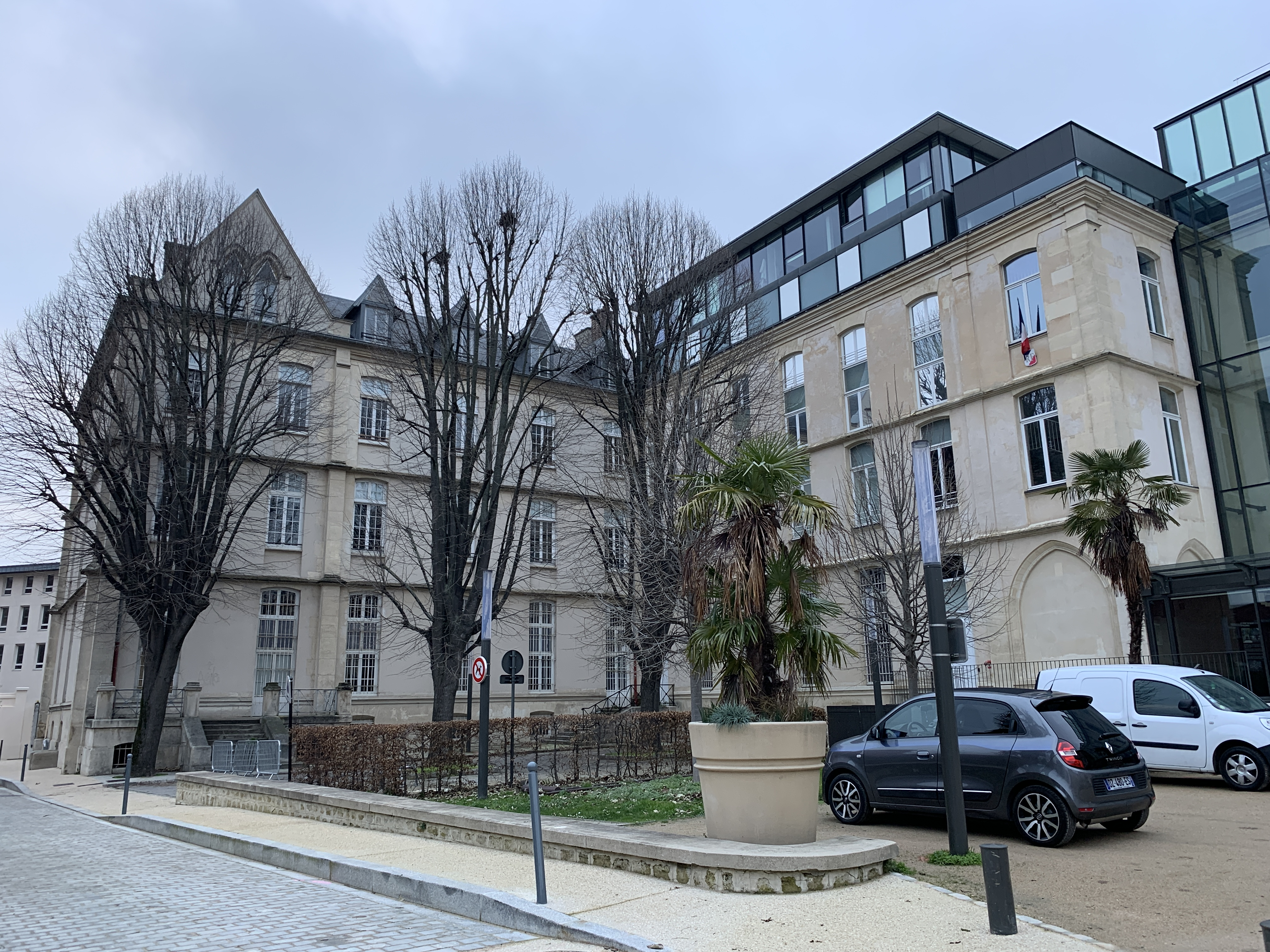
The building on Rue du Séminaire-de-Conflans which once held the novitiate of the Society of the Sacred Heart, now a library.

Having arrived in Paris by way of Bordeaux, Lataste visited Quitterie at the Hôpital des Enfants-Trouvés, before proceeding to seek entry to the Society of the Sacred Heart. She had a letter of recommendation from Darbins and Dupérier to Félix Dupanloup, Superior of the seminary of Saint-Nicolas-du-Chardonnet, but was unable to meet with Dupanloup, and received a discouraging reception from the Director of the seminary. Lataste therefore went directly to the convent of the Sacred Heart. The Mother Superior there, Eugénie de Gramont, being sick, Lataste was received by her assistant Madame de Boisbaudry, who asked her to obtain a recommendation from the Extraordinary Confessor of the Congregation, a Father Cagnard. Once Lataste succeeded in this, she was admitted to the order as a lay sister, on 15 May 1844.

After spending three weeks in the convent on the Rue de Varenne, Lataste was transferred to the main novitiate at Conflans, in Charenton-le-Pont. She remained there until 1845, when she fell ill and was sent as a founding member to a new convent near Rennes for the sake of her health. On 9 May, she and six other nuns arrived in the village of Begasson, and took up residence in their new home. Although three more nuns joined them shortly after, there was still more work than the small number could handle; Lataste managed the infirmary and refectory, as well as other miscellaneous tasks, and the heavy workload quickly became a strain on her health.

In September 1846, Lataste's illness became more severe, and medical treatment failed to improve her condition. Although her novitiate was complete, her vows were delayed in the hope that her health would improve enough to make the usual retreat. After a slight improvement in April, she took a sudden turn for the worse on Sunday the 9th of May. When it became clear that she was near death, she was allowed to make her vows, and then given the Last Rites. After about twelve hours of suffering, Lataste died around four AM on 10 May 1847.

Her remains were later taken to Roehampton, near London.

== Works ==
Under the orders of her spiritual advisors, Darbins and Dupérier, Lataste produced about 800 pages of writings on her spiritual experiences, describing her visions and what they told her. These, alongside a number of her letters, were compiled by Pierre Darbins's nephew, Pascal Darbins. Darbins edited them in the process, changing the order of the passages, correcting orthographical errors, and standardizing usage in places where Lataste wrote in the Gascon dialect, as well as omitting content he found repetitive. Some passages were later found to have been copied directly from the Summa Theologica, and the Catholic Encyclopedia considers the Works of Marie Lataste inauthentic due to the degree of editorial interpolation.

Edward Healy Thompson, in his biography of Lataste, describes her writings as displaying "precision and a familiar simplicity" but containing "nothing which may not be gathered from theological treatises or even catechetical instructions." He also argues that they should be considered miraculous, due to Lataste's lack of formal education and the exhaustive nature of their contents.

Lataste's writings influenced a number of later authors. Gerard Manley Hopkins was influenced by Lataste's writing, quoting from her extensively in his commentary on the Spiritual Exercises. Aldous Huxley, in his Ends and Means, cites her experiences as an example of the Dark Night of the Soul. And Coventry Patmore depicted her as Psyche in his poem The Unknown Eros.

=== Prophecy ===
Among the published Works of Marie Lataste was an account of a prophetic vision, dated sometime before 1843 and first published in 1862, which appeared to describe Pope Pius IX's 1854 proclamation of the Immaculate Conception. Jesus is described as saying to Lataste:

The day is drawing nigh when heaven and earth will unite together to accord to My Mother that which is her due in respect of her highest prerogative. Sin was never in her, and her conception was pure and without stain; it was immaculate, as was the rest of her life. It is My will that this truth should be proclaimed on earth, and acknowledged by all Christians. I have chosen to Myself a Pope, and I have inspired him with this resolution. He will ever have this thought in his mind from the time that he shall be Pope. He will gather together the Bishops of the whole world, that their voices may be heard proclaiming Mary Immaculate in her Conception, and the voices of all shall be united in his voice.

The prophecy later goes on to say:

Now affliction shall come upon the earth, oppression shall reign in the city which I love, and in which I have left My Heart. She shall be in sorrow and desolation, surrounded by enemies on all sides, like a bird taken in a net. This city will seem to succumb during [three years] (Note: The words "three years" here were inserted by Darbins.) and a little longer after these three years. But My Mother shall descend into the City; she will take the hands of the old man seated on a throne, and will say to him, "Behold the hour, arise: See thy enemies: I cause them to disappear one after another, and they disappear for ever. Thou hast rendered glory to me in heaven and on earth, and I will render glory to thee in heaven and on earth. Look at men — they venerate thy name, thy courage, thy power. Thou shalt live, and I will live with thee. Old man, dry thy tears; I bless thee." Peace shall return to the world, Mary shall breathe upon the tempests and appease them; her name shall be praised, blessed, and exalted for ever.

The "city which I love" was understood to refer to Rome, and after Victor Emmanuel II conquered the Papal States in 1870, the three years of oppression were widely believed to have begun. The Vicar General of Aire wrote that "the decisive test of the truth of her prophecies will be the triumph of the present Pope and the deliverance of Rome." Edward Healy argued in 1877 that "a little longer" might encompass an arbitrary number of years, but Herbert Thurston considered this test to have been unambiguously failed by 1915.
