= Timeline of Eastern Orthodoxy in Greece (1974–2008) =

This is a timeline of the presence of Eastern Orthodoxy in Greece from 1974 to 2008. The history of Greece traditionally encompasses the study of the Greek people, the areas they ruled historically, as well as the territory now composing the modern state of Greece.

== Third Hellenic Republic (from 1974) ==
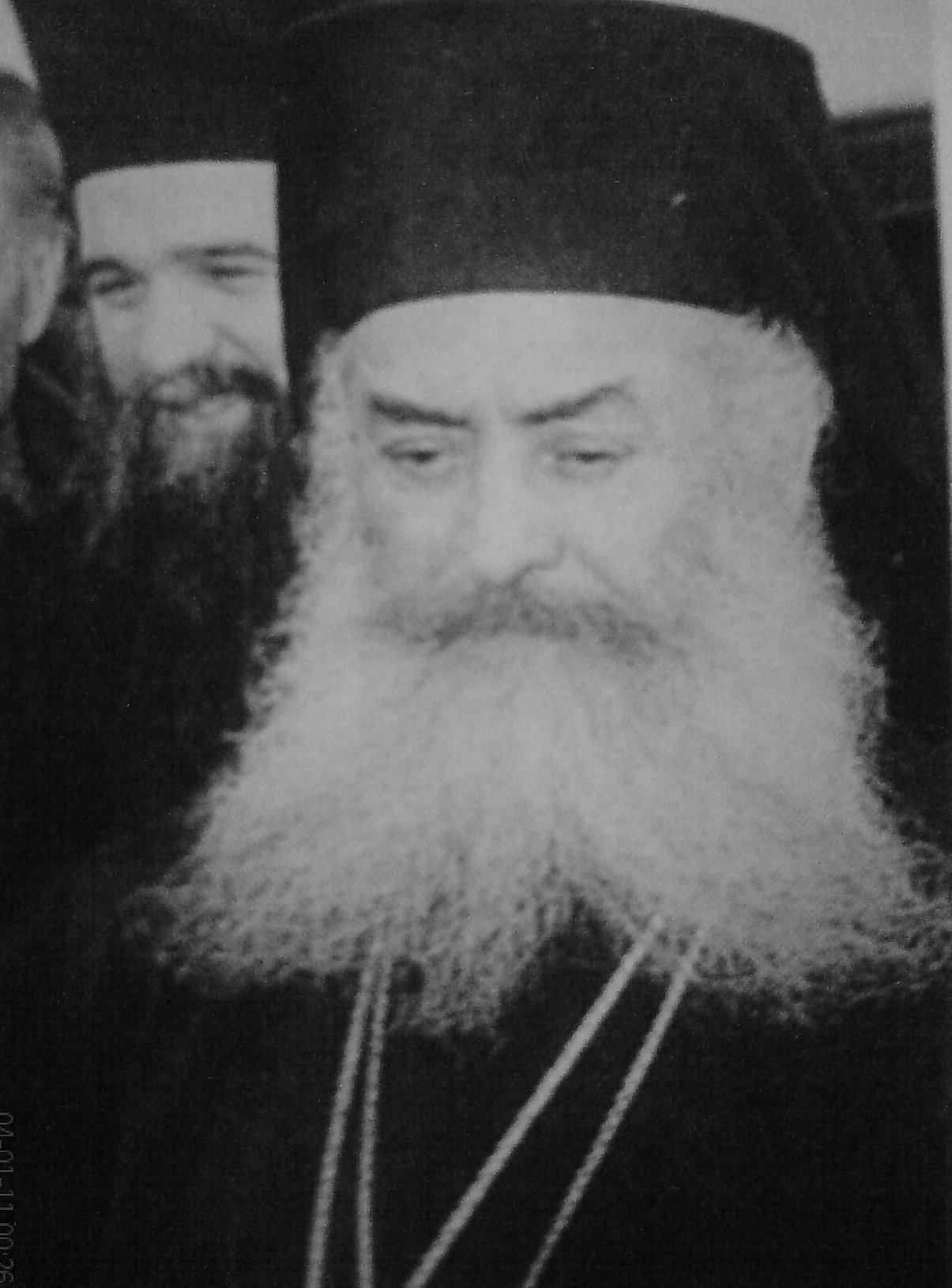
Archbishop Seraphim of Athens and All Greece (1974–1998).

- 1974 Metr. Seraphim of Ioannina is elected Archbishop of Athens and all Greece (1974–1998); the Cathedral of Saint Andrew in Patras is inaugurated, being the largest church in Greece, housing the relics of Saint Andrew the Apostle; Esphigmenou Monastery (Athos), a stronghold for the conservative Greek Old Calendarists, withdrew its representative from the common meetings of the Holy Community at Karyes (the administrative center of Mount Athos), accusing the Patriarchate of being ecumenist, and refusing to commemorate the Patriarch; (Note: "The Mt. Athos Community, led by Fr. Theokletos of Dionysiou and in cooperation with the Patriarchate, consented to the unjust and unethical resolution of the Ecumenical Patriarchate, condemning the Esphigmenou fathers moreover, ordered the exile of the Esphigmenou Abbot and 3 other leaders of the monastery. As a result, under the Military Junta, a Navy Warship enforced a sea blockade and Marines surrounded the monastery for weeks. Unwilling to be intimidated by this overwhelming military force the monastery unfurled a now famous banner over the monastery wall facing the battleship which read "Orthodoxy or Death".") death of Blessed Sophia of Kleisoura (Myrtidiotissa in Schema), the ascetic of Kleisoura, Fool-for-Christ. (Note: Also: Sophia (Chotokourídou née Saoulidi) of Kleisoura, or Sophia the Righteous. Saint Sophia lived as an ascetic in an abandoned monastery in Kleisoura, Western Macedonia, Greece. She died on 6 May 1974. On 4 October, 2011, she was canonized by the Ecumenical Patriarchate.)

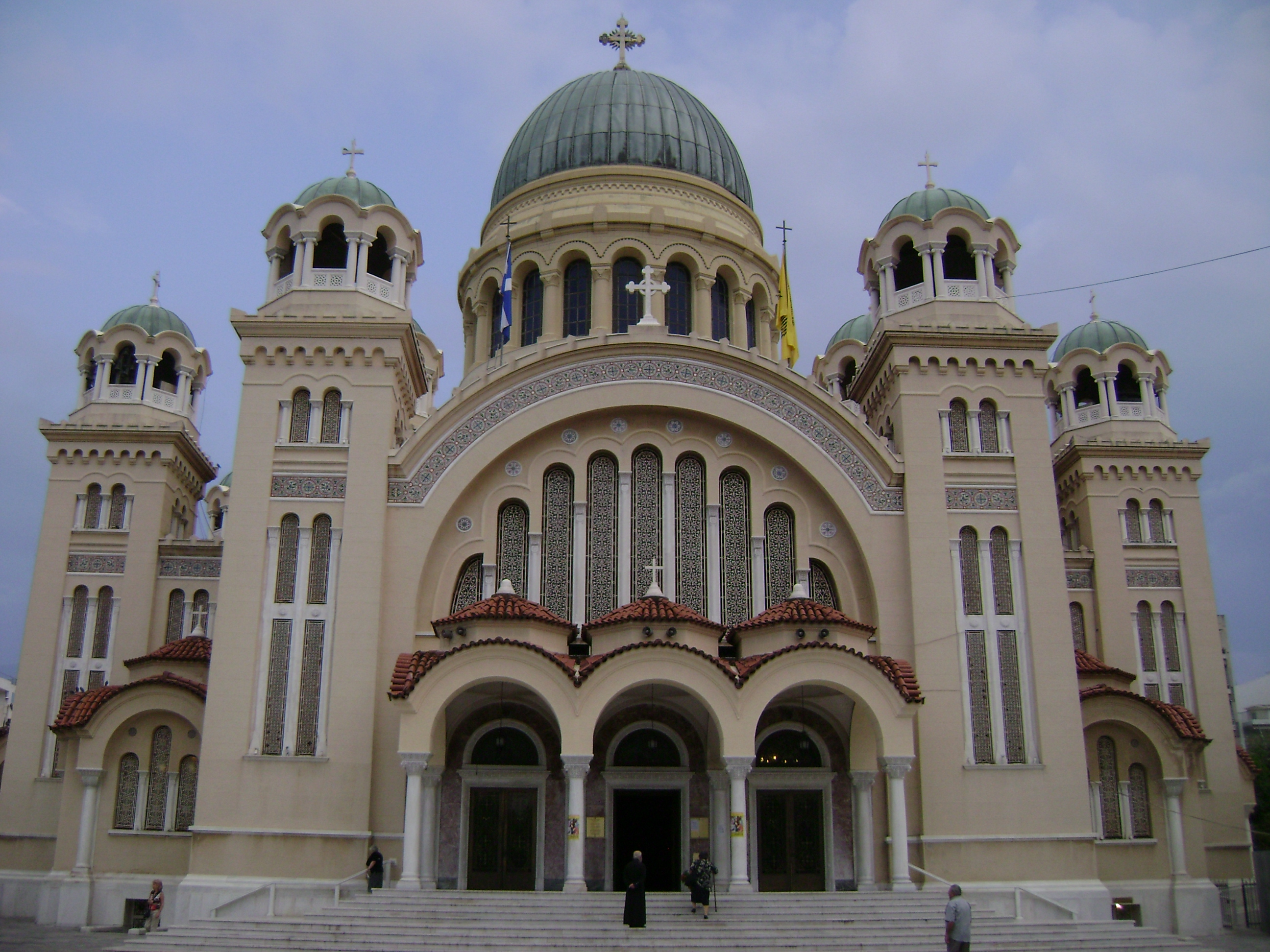
The Cathedral of Agios Andreas (Saint Andrew) in Patras, Achaea, Greece.

- 1975 Death of Papa-Dimitris (Gagastathis); Article 3 of the Greek Constitution officially declares the prevailing religion in Greece as Eastern Orthodoxy under the authority of the autocephalous Church of Greece, united in doctrine to the Ecumenical Patriarchate. (Note: Church and State The Orthodox Church in Greece has been considered historically as the protector of the so-called "Hellenic Orthodox Civilization." The actual role of the Orthodox Church since the creation of the Greek nation-state has been interpreted in many diverse and opposing ways; nevertheless, in all Greek Constitutions the Orthodox Church is accorded the status of the "prevailing religion". Article 3 of Greece's Constitution defines the relations between the Church and the State : "The prevailing religion in Greece is that of the Eastern Orthodox Church of Christ. The Orthodox Church of Greece, acknowledging our Lord Jesus Christ as its head, is inseparably united in doctrine with the Great Church of Christ in Constantinople and with every other Church of Christ of the same doctrine, observing unwaveringly, as they do, the holy apostolic and synodal canons and sacred traditions. It is autocephalous and is administered by the Holy Synod of serving Bishops and the Permanent Holy Synod originating thereof and assembled as specified by the Statutory Charter of the Church in compliance with the provisions of the Patriarchal Tome of 29 June 1850 and the Synodal Act of 4 September 1928." Greece is the only Orthodox state in the world. The relationship between the Church and the State can be characterized as sui generis, since there is no complete separation nor is there an established church. The Church is the State-Church. The role of the Orthodox Church in maintaining Greek ethnic and cultural identity during the 400 years of Ottoman rule has strengthened the bond between religion and government. Most Greeks, whether personally religious or not, revere and respect the Orthodox Christian faith, attend church and major feast days, and are emotionally attached to Orthodox Christianity as their "national" religion.)
- 1976 The Dimotiki (Demotic) language form of Modern Greek was made the official language, replacing the purified and formal Katharevousa language of Modern Greek which had been in use for nearly two centuries since foundation of the modern Greek state. (Note: The Greek language question was finally laid to rest on 30 April 1976, when Article 2 of Law 309 – still written in katharevousa – stipulated that Modern Greek should be the sole language of education at all levels, starting with the school year 1977–78. According to Professor Yannaras: "the "language question" which divided Greece for over a hundred and fifty years – the "katharevousa" versus "demotic" controversy – never troubled the theologians, who followed the state-imposed "official" language, which until 1976 was a precondition for an academic career. When the government changed the rules, theologians dutifully adopted a language which was equally artificial... ...exemplifying theology's isolation from the country's traditions and the problems of the laity. Living linguistic expression is theology's vital need. It is through language that the fundamental difference between ecclesiastical theology and religious teaching or dogmatic ideology is revealed.")
- 1977 Death of noted Greek theologian and professor Panagiotes N. Trembelas; (Note: "His 2,035 publications covered most aspects of academic theology. He wrote commentaries on all the books of the New Testament, with long extracts from patristic texts. He published critical editions of Three Liturgies and Small Euchologion on the basis of the liturgical manuscripts preserved in the libraries of Athens. He wrote books on homiletics and catechetics. He systematically refuted materialism, nihilism, and historical criticism of the Gospels. He also published studies on dogmatics, symbolics, and canon law. He translated the New Testament into the vernacular. His three-volume Dogmatics defended Christian doctrine with many patristics texts... [However] Trembelas' stature is sadly diminished by his entrapment in a Western theological outlook. He stands out from the spiritual environment of his time yet was also a part of it. From his youth he was an active member of a movement seeking to bring about a "spiritual renewal" in Greece on the model of Protestant pietism. He never questioned the movement's compatibility with his own spiritual roots.") conversion of French theologian and Cistercian monk Placide Deseille (fr), together with two other Cistercian monks, Séraphim (Pyotte) and Elie (Ragot), who received baptism from Igumen Emilian of Simonopetra on Mt. Athos, later accepting the schema and being ordained as hieromonks of the Simonopetra brotherhood, subsequently founding various Athonite Metochia of Simonopetra in France. (Note: In 1978 the Orthodox Monastère Orthodoxe Saint-Antoine-le-Grand (ru) was founded in Saint-Laurent-en-Royans in southeastern France, with the blessing of Metr. Meletios (Karabinis) of France and Schema Archimadrite Aimilianos (Vafeidis) of Simonopetra Monastery. In 1991 the Monastère de Solan (fr) was founded in La Bastide-d'Engras in southern France. And in 1995 the Monastère orthodoxe de Sainte-Marie de l’Egypte was founded on Porquerolles island by Père Seraphim.)
- 1978 Abortions are legalised in Greece but only under certain specific circumstances; (Note: "As a result of the efforts of various organizations, such as the Family Planning Association of Greece, the law on abortion in Greece was liberalized in 1978 (Law No. 821 of 14 October). Under the new law, abortion was thereafter permitted for reasons of serious foetal abnormalities during the first 20 weeks of pregnancy. It was also allowed in cases of a risk to the mental health of the mother, as determined by a psychiatrist on the staff of a public hospital, but only in the first 12 weeks of gestation.") through the efforts of Metr. Panteleimon (Chrysofakis) of Thessalonica, the sacred relics St. David of Thessalonica (David the Dendrite) were triumphantly returned to Thessaloniki from Milan, Italy, after having been taken by Crusaders in 1236 AD; (Note: The sacred relics were housed in the Basilica of Saint Demetrios the Great Martyr. To celebrate this feast a Service was written by the renowned hymnographer Elder Gerasimos Mikragiannanitis. Eventually the relics were transferred to the Katholikon of the Monastery of Saint Theodora in the middle of Thessaloniki in a chapel surrounded by icons of the Saint's life.) the Holy Synod of the Church of Greece founded the Integration Centre for Returning Migrants, Immigrants, Asylum Seekers and Refugees (KSPM). (Note: The Orthodox Church of Greece has played a very active role in the field of migration in Greece, by creating special services, aiming at the efficient management of migration-related issues, as well as the overall pastoral support of migrants and refugees. The KSPM started functioning as a common project of WCC ("Diakonisches Werk der EKD" and "Dienste in Ubersee", 1974-1990), and later on (1990) became a service of the Holy Synod, depending directly on the Office of the Inter-Church Aid and Foreign Relations Committee. In 1994, after the closing down of the "WCC Refugee Service in Greece", and following an agreement between the WCC and the Church of Greece, the continuation of the WCC-Greece work with asylum seekers and refugees was assigned to the KSPM. A new service was established under the name "Ecumenical Refugee Programme" (ERP, or KSPM-ERP).)
- 1979 Martyrdom of Archimandrite Philoumenos (Hasapis) of Jacob's Well.
- 1980 Greece and the Holy See formally established diplomatic relations; (Note: (in Greek) "Καταρχάς οι διπλωματικές σχέσεις συνάπτονται με την Αγία Έδρα κι όχι με το Κράτος της Πόλης του Βατικανού. Τις διπλωματικές σχέσεις δεν τις ζητά ποτέ η Αγία Έδρα αλλά τα κράτη προς αυτήν. Τέλος, πρέπει να σημειωθεί ότι η ιδιότητα του νούντσιου είναι διττή: εκκλησιαστική και διπλωματική. Για λόγους αρχής και για λόγους θεολογικούς, η Εκκλησία της Ελλάδος δεν αναγνώρισε ποτέ την παρουσία του Αποστολικού Αντινούντσιου στην Αθήνα. Σύμφωνα με την ορθόδοξη εκκλησιολογία είναι απαράδεκτο Προκαθήμενος Εκκλησίας (όπως ο Πάπας που είναι Προκαθήμενος της καθολικής Εκκλησίας) να έχει και κοσμική εξουσία ως Αρχηγός Κράτους και κατ’ επέκταση είναι αδιανόητο να έχει πρέσβεις. Βέβαια για λόγους αβρότητας ή ειδικούς λόγους, κατά περίπτωση, οι αντινούντσιοι επισκέφθηκαν τους Αρχιεπισκόπους Αθηνών και πάσης Ελλάδος, αλλά δεν είχαν ποτέ επίσημες επαφές με την Ορθόδοξη Εκκλησία της χώρας.") death of Elder Philotheos (Zervakos) of Paros; (Note: See: S. Kementzentzidis. The Blessed Elder Philotheos Zervakos. Transl. by Palis and Chalice. Thessaloniki, 1986.; C. Cavarnos. Blessed Elder Philotheos Zervakos. Institute for Byzantine and Modern Greek Studies, Belmont MA 1993. ISBN 0-914744-93-3) Orthodox-Roman Catholic Joint Commission for Theological Dialogue, 1st plenary, met in Patmos and Rhodes; Extraordinary Joint Conference of the Sacred Community of Mount Athos, 9–22 April, resolved publicly to state the opinion of the Athonite fathers on the subject of dialogue with the heterodox; (Note: "..."Orthodoxy is not one of the churches, but The Church herself. She has preserved precisely and authentically the teaching of Christ in its pristine splendor and in all its purity. Over and above a simple, unbroken historical continuity and consistency there exists in her a spiritual and ontological authenticity. The same Faith, the same Spirit, the same life. It is this which constitutes the distinguishing feature of Orthodoxy and which justifies her claim that she is and remains The Church" (Episkepsis, #227, 15 March 1980)...From the Orthodox point of view there is no justification for Optimism in regard to the dialogue, and for this reason no haste should be exhibited concerning it. The Roman Catholics are pressing the dialogue, hoping to strengthen themselves by annexing Orthodoxy to themselves, for they are confronted by very powerful internal disturbances and crises, as is well known. The number of former Roman Catholics who have converted to Orthodoxy also disturbs them. But Orthodoxy has no reason to hasten towards dialogue since the papists remain so obdurate and immovable as regards infallibility, uniatism, and the rest of their pernicious teachings. Hastening the dialogue under such conditions is equivalent to spiritual suicide for the Orthodox.") Greek priest-monk Fr. Athanasios Anthides travelled to India to begin a systematic Orthodox Mission in the rural area of Arambah, in West Bengal state, in eastern India; death of Patr. Benedict I of Jerusalem, who had actively pursued a rehabilitation of the Church of the Holy Sepulchre.

Member State of the European Community (European Union)

- 1981 Greece becomes the 10th member of the European Community, 1 January; conservatives of the Esphigmenou Monastery (Athos) refuse common market aid to Mt. Athos; Adultery is decriminalized in the penal code.
- 1982 Death of Archimandrite Haralambos Vasilopoulos, founder of the Pan-Hellenic Orthodox Union in 1959 («Πανελληνίου Ορθοδόξου Ενώσεως» (Π.Ο.Ε.)) and its organ Orthodoxos Typos, and a faithful defender of the Orthodox Faith, being the author of over 300 publications including books exposing occultism and anti-Christian sects; (Note: His books exposing occultism and anti-christian sects included the following titles in Greek: Τέρατα και σημεία των Σκοτεινών Δυνάμεων.; Υπάρχουν Μάγια; H Eβραιομασωνία ξεσκεπάζεται.; Ξεσκέπασμα των Xιλιαστών.; O Oικουμενισμός χωρίς μάσκα.; Ξεσκέπασμα της Θεοσοφίας.; Ξεσκέπασμα του Pόταρυ.) death of renowned lay preacher and Orthodox writer Dimitrios Panagopoulos (1916-1982); glorification of the Venerable Eugenios of Aetolia († 1682); monotonic orthography was imposed by law on the Greek language, (Note: "The five accents – three stress and two initial vowel aspirates – have been reduced, by a bill voted through parliament in mid-January, to just one, used to mark the stress on words of two syllables or more. According to Education Minister Eleftherios Veryvakis, the introduction of the monotonic system – already in use by most of Greece's newspapers – will "encourage a love of literature" and substantially reduce the printing costs of school books. At the same time, it will save students and teachers an estimated 6,000 grammar-lesson hours a year...The Government is also pressing ahead with legislation to introduce civil marriage in place of the compulsory religious marriage ceremony – a move which, along with changes in the family law code designed to give women equal rights, spells anathema to the conservative Greek Orthodox Church.") however the Greek Orthodox Church continues to use polytonic orthography; civil marriage is introduced in Greece in 1982, although the overwhelming majority still marries in church and Orthodox clergymen sometimes refuse burial rites and other rights to those not married in church.
- 1983 Death of Elder Arsenios the cave-dweller of Mt. Athos.
- 1984 Orthodox-Roman Catholic Joint Commission, 3rd plenary, meets in Khania, Crete; (Note: "A third round of talks between the Roman Catholic and Eastern Orthodox churches ended Friday in disagreement over the ways to resolve the disputes that have divided them for more than 900 years. The dialogue, started in 1980 and held once every two years, focused on theological differences over the nature of the Christian Church's holy mysteries, according to a spokesman for the Orthodox Academy of Kolymbari on this southern Greek island. The spokesman said Dutch Cardinal Johannes Willebrands of the Vatican and Greek Orthodox Archbishop Stylianos of Australia led the talks over the relative importance of baptism, anointment and the eucharist to Christianity.") professor Georgios Mantzaridis publishes "The Deification of Man" , setting forth the theological and anthropological basis for the doctrine of deification as expounded by St. Gregory Palamas (1296-1359). (Note: Greorgios I. Mantzaridis is one of the foremost Greek Orthodox theologians today. Born in Thessaloniki, Greece in 1935, he is Professor of Ethics and Sociology of Christianity at the Theological School of the Aristotelian University of Thessaloniki. Professor Mantzaridis is the author of numerous books, many of which have been translated into several languages. His main works available in English include "The Deification of Man" (1984) and "Orthodox Spiritual Life" (1994). His textbooks on "Christian Ethics" and "Sociology of Christianity" are considered by many Orthodox scholars to be classics in their fields.)
- 1986 Root of Jesse icon of the Mother of God in Andros (the "Myrovlytissa"), begins gushing myrrh; glorification of Arsenios the Cappadocian (†1924) by the Patriarchate of Constantinople; (Note: See: Elder Paisios of Mount Athos. Saint Arsenios the Cappadocian. Transl. by the Holy Monastery "Evangelist John the Theologian", Souroti, Thessaloniki, Greece. 2001.; (in Greek) Μοναχού Παϊσίου Αγιορείτου. Ὁ Ἂγιος Ἀρσένιος ὁ Καππαδόκης. Εκδόσεις Ιερού Ησυχαστηρίου Μοναζουσών «Ευαγγελιστής Ιωάννης ο Θεολόγος», Σουρωτή Θεσσαλονίκης, 1991.) the performance of abortions was further liberalized by Law No. 1609 of 28 June 1986."
- 1987 In April, parliament approved a law to expropriate monastic land in order to redistribute some to poor peasants, and to take over administration of urban church-owned assets, however Abp. Seraphim (Tikas) of Athens was victorious in preventing the government from expropriating church landholdings, by allowing some land redistribution while opposing nationalisation of church and monastery land; (Note: "His most dramatic clash came in the mid-1980s when late Socialist Premier Andreas Papandreou tried to expropriate the Church's vast land holdings. Seraphim eventually won the battle and in retaliation excommunicated seven government officials.") on August 19 Patr. Pimen of Moscow and All Russia, and Ec. Patr. Demetrios I of Constantinople co-celebrated the Divine Liturgy on the Feast of the Transfiguration at the Holy Trinity St. Sergius Monastery, being the first concelebration in 398 years (since January 1589).
- 1988 Canonization of Eustathius of Thessalonica (†1197); Mount Athos and the Meteora are designated as UNESCO World Heritage sites; radio station "Church of Piraeus 91.2 FM" begins transmitting in October, through the efforts of Metr. Kallinikos (Karousos) of Piraeus (1978-2006); death of Fr George Pirounakis, a turbulent cleric who opposed the right-wing dictatorship of 1967–1974, supported student uprisings against the junta, and later demanded that bishops who had succoured the tyrants should be held to account.
- 1989 Hellenic Bible Society publishes a translation of the New Testament into the modern vernacular (Demotic Greek), The New Testament diglot, containing both the Patriarchal edition of 1904, along with a parallel translation in Today's Greek Version, having the blessing, approval and endorsements of the Ecumenical Patriarchate of Constantinople, the Holy Synod of the Church of Greece, the Patriarchate of Alexandria, the Patriarchate of Jerusalem, and the Pedagogical Institute of the Greek Ministry for Education and Religion; Mystras is designated as a UNESCO World Heritage site;
- 1990 Bilateral declarations of both Greece and Israel are made on 21 May 1990 in which they normalized their diplomatic relations, essentially recognizing the special interest of the Greek Government in a Greek Orthodox presence in the Holy Places, as well as its right to have a say in any future arrangements concerning the religious status quo and the rights and privileges of the Patriarchate of Jerusalem; the monasteries of Daphni (Athens), Hosios Loukas (Beotia) and Nea Moni of Chios, are designated as UNESCO World Heritage sites; death of Fr. Athanasios Anthides, first Greek Orthodox Missionary to India, succeeded a year later by priest-monk Fr. Ignatios Sennis, who came to Calcutta to continue the mission; the Friends of Mount Athos society is formed, with Metr. Kallistos (Ware) of Diokleia as president, including Prince Philip (Duke of Edinburgh) and Prince Charles (The Prince of Wales) among its members.
- 1991 Death of Elder Porphyrios (Bairaktaris) the Kapsokalivite (Evangelos (Bairaktaris)) 7 February; Kyriopascha occurs; (Note: From antiquity the Orthodox Church has celebrated with special liturgical joy the occurrence when Pascha falls on 25 March (Old Style) - the Feast of the Annunciation, calling it "Kyriopascha," "the Lord's Pascha". It was precisely on the coincidence of the Feasts of the Annunciation and Pascha on 25 March 1821 (Old Style), that Greece challenged the Turkish Yoke. Kyriopascha has also manifested its miraculous Grace to our own generation by its most recent occurrence in 1991, the year of the demise of Communism in Russia, a demise which, furthermore, was finalized by a last, desperate gasp in the form of an abortive Communist coup thwarted on 6 August (Old Style)–the Feast of the Transfiguration. The last Kyriopascha on the Julian calendar was in 1991; the next will be in 2075, 2086 and 2159. The last Kyriopascha on the Gregorian Calendar was in 1951, and the next will be in 2035, 2046 and 2103.) Greek Orthodox Archdiocese of Italy is created; syncretistic synod of the Antiochian Patriarchate convened and presided over by Patriarch Ignatius IV of Antioch, and attended by the heretical Monophysite Jacobite Syrian Patriarch Ignatius Zakka, implements a series of measures aimed at achieving full union with the Monophysite Syriac Churches, declaring their patriarchates to be "sister churches" despite the Christological differences, and allowing joint prayer in the agreed statement. (Note: This action by the Patriarchate of Antioch was protested by the Sacred Community of Mount Athos, in a Letter to the Ecumenical Patriarch Concerning the Balamand Agreement, 8 December 1993, which was signed by all the Representatives and Presidents of the Twenty Sacred Monasteries of the Holy Mountain of Athos: "...we cite the case of the Patriarchate of Antioch, which, without a Pan-Orthodox decision, has proceeded to ecclesiastical communion with the Non-Chalcedonians [Monophysites]. This was done despite the fact that a most serious issue has not yet been resolved. It is the latter's non-acceptance of the Ecumenical Councils after the Third and, in particular, the Fourth, the Council of Chalcedon, which in fact constitutes an immovable basis of Orthodoxy. Unfortunately, in this case, too, we have not seen a single protest by other Orthodox Churches.")
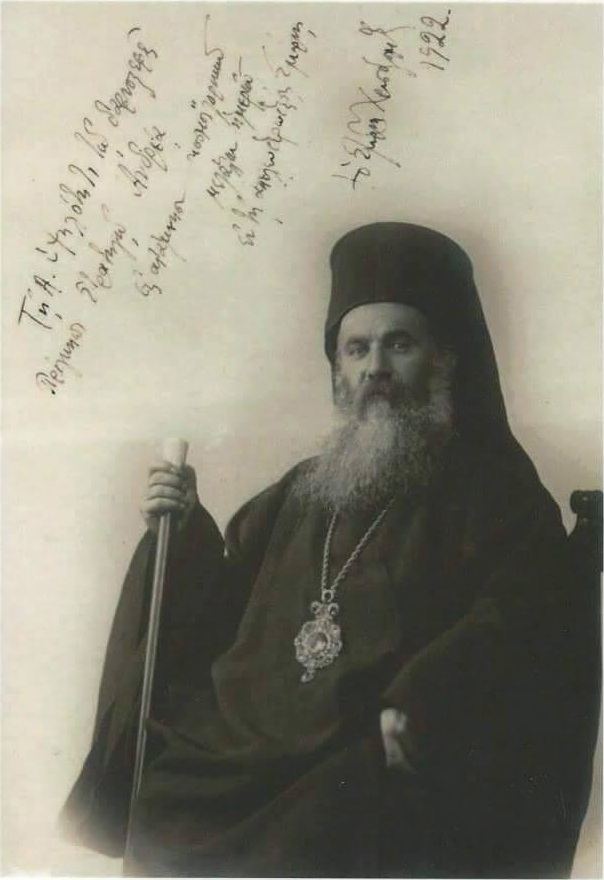
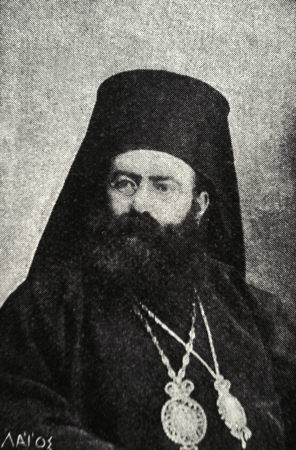
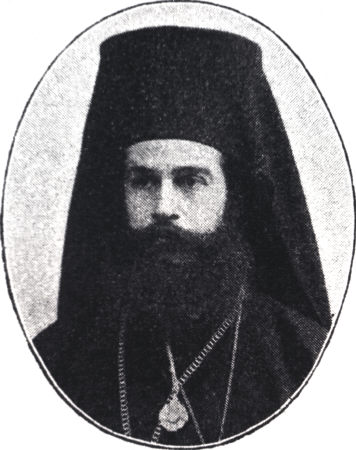
Among the victims of the atrocities committed by the Turkish nationalist Army (1922–23) were hundreds of Christian clergy in Anatolia, such as metropolitan bishops (from left): Chrysostomos of Smyrna (lynched), Prokopios of Iconium (imprisoned and poisoned) Gregory of Kydonies (executed), Ambrosios of Moschonisia (buried alive). These bishops were glorified by the Orthodox Church of Greece in 1992.
- 1992 Synaxis of primates of Orthodox churches in Constantinople; (Note: "AN unprecedented summit of world Orthodox leaders has ended with a strong attack on the Vatican, harming chances of an early improvement in the deeply troubled relations between the two Christian Church groups. Closing their meeting in Istanbul, the 12 spiritual heads of Eastern Christianity said attempts by Roman Catholics to proselytise in eastern Europe and the former Soviet Union had inflicted a "most severe wound on the dialogue between the Churches which will be difficult to heal". The leaders said: "Traditional Orthodox countries have been considered 'missionary territories' [by the Vatican] and proselytism is practised with all the methods that have been condemned and rejected for decades by all Christians".") Patr. Diodoros I of Jerusalem presented a list of firm declarations of Orthodox convictions of the Patriarchate of Jerusalem, which was entered into the minutes of the assembly of Orthodox leaders at the Phanar on the Sunday of Orthodoxy; on 4 November 1992, the Holy Synod of the Church of Greece unanimously declared Bp. Chrysostomos of Smyrna (†1922) an Ethnomartyr and a Saint of the Eastern Orthodox Church, to be jointly commemorated on the Sunday before the Feast of the Elevation of the Holy Cross, together with four other Holy Hierarchs of Asia Minor including: Bp. Ambrosios Moschonision, Bp. Euthymios (Agritellis) of Zela (†1921), Bp. Gregorios of Kidonion (†1922), and Bp. Prokopios of Iconium (†1923); (Note: Their ranking to the chorus of the Saints was formally announced in Encyclical 2556, of 5 July 1993, of the Holy Synod of the Church of Greece ((in Greek) Εγκύκλιος 2556 της 5ης Ιουλίου 1993 της Ιεράς Συνόδου της Εκκλησίας της Ελλάδος).) in June, Patr. Alexy II of Moscow visits Church of Greece; deaths of Eldress Gabrielia (Papayannis) (Note: Born in Constantinople 2/15 October 1897. Passed from this world on 28 March 1992. Spiritual daughter to Fr. Amphilochios Makris the Elder.) and Chrysanthi of Andros; the total congregation of the Patriarchate of Jerusalem in 1992 was estimated at 145,000 Greek Orthodox Palestinians in the Occupied Territories, Israel and Jordan, representing the largest Christian congregation in historic Palestine, and Jerusalem in particular.
- 1993 Church of Cyprus condemned Freemasonry as a religion incompatible with Christianity; Orthodox-Roman Catholic Joint Theological Commission meets in Balamand, Lebanon, issuing common document "Uniatism: Method of Union of the Past, and Present. Search for Full Communion" (the "Balamand declaration"), equating the Orthodox and Roman Catholics as "sister churches", and concluding that rebaptism should be avoided, while "'uniatism' can no longer be accepted either as a method to be followed nor as a model of the unity our Churches are seeking". (Note: This declaration was roundly criticized in Orthodox literature: THE BALAMAND UNION: A Victory of Vatican Diplomacy. CENTER FOR TRADITIONALIST ORTHODOX STUDIES, St. Gregory Palamas Monastery, Etna, CA. July–September, 1993. (pdf); Papism, the Hagiorite Fathers, and the Aftermath of the "Balamand Union". Transl. from the Greek by Patrick G. Barker. Hagios Kyprianos, no. 258 (January–February 1994), pp. 211-215. (pdf); Letter to the Ecumenical Patriarch Concerning the Balamand Agreement. Orthodox Christian Information Center. Retrieved: 20 August 2016. (From: Orthodox Life, Vol. 44, No. 4, July–August 1994, pp. 26-39).)
- 1994 Death of Elder Paisios (Eznepidis) of Mt. Athos, 12 July; Greek Parliament passes a resolution marking 19 May as "Pontus Genocide Remembrance Day"; the Liaison Office of the Orthodox Church to the European Union was established in Brussels by the Holy Synod of the Ecumenical Patriarchate; Museum of Byzantine Culture is inaugurated in Thessaloniki.
- 1995 Elder Ephraim of Philotheou begins founding Athonite-style monasteries in North America; (Note: St. Anthony's Greek Orthodox Monastery (Florence, Arizona) was founded in 1995 by six Athonite monks along with Elder Ephraim, former abbot of Philotheou monastery on Mount Athos, with the blessings of Metropolitan Anthony (Gergiannakis) of San Francisco.) death of Eldress Macrina of Portaria; Ecumenical Patr. Bartholomew I visits Patmos as part of the celebration of the 1,900th anniversary of the writing of the Book of Revelation by the Evangelist John.
- 1996 Greek Orthodox Archdiocese of North and South America is reorganized by the Ecumenical Patriarchate, dividing the administration of the two continents into four parts (America, Canada, Central America, and South America); in his thesis Clash of Civilizations professor Samuel P. Huntington argued that one geopolitical alliance in the post-Cold War world would be an Eastern-Christian bloc, linking Russia, Serbia and Greece. (Note: Somewhat similarly, in 1971 professor Dimitri Obolensky coined the phrase The Byzantine Commonwealth, to refer to the area where Byzantine liturgical tradition was spread during the Middle Ages by Byzantine missionaries. This area covers approximately the modern-day countries of Bulgaria, the Republic of Macedonia, Montenegro, Russia, Serbia, Romania, Ukraine, Georgia, Moldova and Belarus.)
- 1997 A bomb explodes at the Ecumenical Patriarchate of Constantinople, seriously injuring Orthodox deacon Nectarius Nikolou and damaging several buildings, being the third such attack in recent years, following the ones in 1994 and 1996; Thessaloniki is the cultural capital of Europe (1997); posthumous recognition by the State of Israel of Metr. Joachim (Alexopoulos) of Demetrias for saving the lives of 700 people during World War II who were hidden by the residents of the villages of Mount Pelion, having his name inscribed in the Holocaust Museum in Washington, and entered on the Righteous Honor Wall at Yad Vashem in Jerusalem; in the case of Canea Catholic Church v. Greece (143/1996/762/963), the European Court of Human Rights (ECtHR) held unanimously that the Greek courts had violated article 6 of the European Convention on Human Rights by refusing to acknowledge that the Canea Catholic Church in Crete had legal personality. (Note: "The Greek Government complied with decision No. 143/1996/762/963 of 16-12-1997 of the European Court of Human Rights about the legal entity of the Catholic establishments in Greece. Law 2731/5.7.1999 was amended with the addition of an article no. 33, which stipulates: "the legal entities that have been maintained in effect by virtue of article 13 of the Introductory Law of the Civil Code shall include those establishments of the Catholic Church of Greece that were created or have been in operation prior to 23/2/1946." 23 February 1946, was the date when the Greek Civil Code came into effect.")

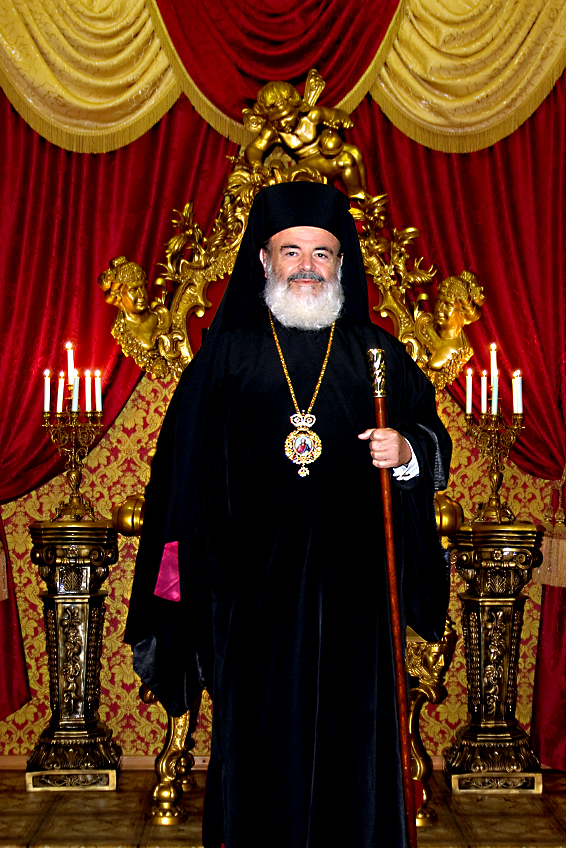
Archbishop Christodoulos of Athens and All Greece (1998–2008).

- 1998 Archbishop Christodoulos (Paraskevaides) was enthroned in Athens as the new head of the Greek Orthodox Church (1998–2008); Archbishop Christodoulos makes first official visit of a Greek Primate to the Ecumenical Patriarchate of Constantinople in 24 years (since 1974); (Note: The visit aimed at restoring ties between Athens and the Patriarchate, which had been marred by the refusal of Seraphim to let the Ecumenical Patriarchate open an office in Athens. The Primate of Greece, who replaced Seraphim after his death, was also due to ask the Patriarch's permission to install an office of the Greek Orthodox Church in Brussels.) establishment of the Office of the Representation of the Church of Greece to the European Union in Brussels; (Note: (in Greek) Το Γραφείο της Αντιπροσωπείας της Εκκλησίας της Ελλάδος βρίσκεται στις Βρυξέλλες και λειτουργεί από το έτος 1998, είναι υπηρεσία της Ιεράς Συνόδου της Αγιωτάτης Εκκλησίας της Ελλάδος στο εξωτερικό και στεγάζεται σε ιδιόκτητο κτήριο που εγκαινιάσθηκε στις 4 Οκτωβρίου 2003 από τον Μακαριώτατο Αρχιεπίσκοπο Αθηνών και Πάσης Ελλάδος κ.κ. Χριστόδουλο.) death of Elder Ephraim of Katounakia; death of missionary Archimandrite Chariton Pneumatikakis, having served the Orthodox mission in Kananga, Democratic Republic of the Congo, for 25 years (1973-1998); (Note: On Sunday 21 October 2012 the Pope and Patriarch of Alexandria and All Africa, Theodoros II, consecrated the Church of Saint Andrew in Kananga, Congo, being the largest Orthodox Church in Africa to date. During his homily, His Beatitude spoke about the vision of the late missionary Fr. Charitonas Pneumatikakis, about the construction of a large Orthodox Church in the region of Kananga, a project which began in 2004 and was completed in 2010 by the then Metropolitan of Central Africa and the current Metropolitan of Pentapoleos, Ignatios.) by an overwhelming parliamentary majority, including both major parties (PASOK and ND), the separation of church and state was excluded (in 1998) from the constitutional revision that was eventually completed in April 2001; Thessaloniki Summit held to discuss Orthodox participation in WCC; on 8 December the Bioethics Committee of the Church of Greece was created to study contemporary bioethical problems in depth from a scientific viewpoint based on Orthodox ethos and the theological perception of man, society and values; Greek parliament affirmed the genocide of Greeks in Asia Minor as a whole (Pontian and Anatolian Ottoman Greeks), and designated 14 September a day of commemoration.
- 20th century Notable Greek Orthodox modern writers include: Metr. John Zizioulas of Pergamon; Archimandrite Vasileios Gontikakis; (Note: The Archimandrite Vasileios Gontikakis, who was abbot of Stavronikita for twenty years and since 1990 has been abbot of Iveron, is generally recognized as the most representative spokesman of the monastic renewal on Mt. Athos. His books - Hymn of Entry, Abba Isaac the Syrian, The Parable of the Prodigal, Theological Commentary on the Iconography of the Monastery of Stavronikita - have been translated and reprinted many times. They are written in a theological style totally new in Greece, reflecting the immediacy of real experience. Gontikakis is the great witness to "Philokalian" spirituality.) Prof. Christos Yannaras; Prof. Fr. John S. Romanides (†2001); Bp. Hierotheos (Vlachos) of Nafpaktos; Protopresbyter Nikolaos Loudovikos; Protopresbyter George Metallinos; Protopresbyter Theodore Zisis; (Note: See: (in Greek) Πρωτοπρεσβύτερος Θεόδωρος Ζήσης. Βικιπαίδεια. (Greek Wikipedia).) Prof. Georgios Mantzaridis; and Panayiotis Nellas (†1986), among others.
- 2000–2001 Government of Greece orders removal of compulsory reference to religious affiliation on state identity cards, despite widespread campaigns against this from the Church of Greece and the majority of the public. (Note: The church took the unprecedented step of organizing the collection of signatures demanding that a referendum be held on the issue of the new identity cards and their mention of religion. The collection of signatures dragged on for several months, well into 2001. In the end, the church claimed to have collected over three million signatures.)
- 2001 Death of Elder Haralambos Dionysiatis, teacher of noetic prayer; on the first trip to Greece by a Pope since AD 710, Pope John Paul II of Rome apologizes to Orthodox Church for Fourth Crusade; a day earlier some 1,000 Orthodox conservatives took to the streets to denounce his visit; in March, Abp. Christodoulos (Paraskevaides) of Athens blessed the Hellenic Genocide Petition Effort, which urged that the government not violate Law 2675/98 by deleting the term "genocide" when explaining the destruction of Hellenism in Asia Minor; Abp. Christodoulos (Paraskevaides) of Athens visits the Patriarchate of Moscow, being also received by Russian president Vladimir Putin; pastoral agreement between the Coptic Orthodox Church and Greek Orthodox Patriarchate of Alexandria and all Africa, agreeing to accept the sacrament of marriage which is conducted in either Church, as well as performing all other sacraments to that new family of Mixed Christian Marriage; death of distinguished scholar Dimitri Obolensky, Russian-born historian who traced the influence of Byzantine civilisation in Eastern European identity.

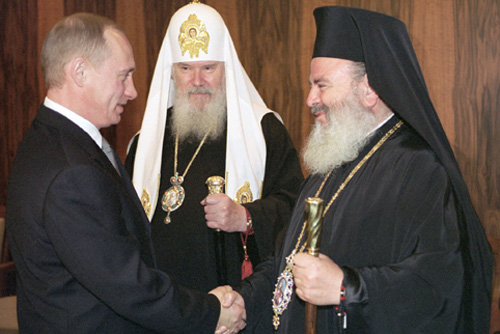
Russian president Vladimir Putin, Patriarch of Moscow and All Russia Alexii II, and head of the Greek Orthodox Church Archbishop Christodoulos of Athens and all Greece, at the Kremlin in Moscow.

- 2002 The Holy Synod of the Church of Greece rejected a proposal to introduce Modern Greek into the Divine Liturgy (similar to what the Second Vatican Council did for the Roman Catholic Church by allowing the use of the vernacular for the Mass), opting to keep Koine Greek as it was spoken 2,000 years ago and used in New Testament texts; Metropolis of Glyfada is established as a new metropolis separating from Metropolis of Nea Smyrni; Ecumenical Patriarch Bartholomew I of Constantinople declared the monks of Esphigmenou Monastery (Athos) as being in schism with the Eastern Orthodox Church; Patr. Bartholomew I (Archontonis) of Constantinople and Pope John Paul II co-sign Venice Declaration of Environmental Ethics.
- 2003 Abp. Christodoulos (Paraskevaides) of Athens inaugurated the Office of the Representation of the Church of Greece to the European Union in Brussels; (Note: "The emergence of an official office, the 'Representation of the Church of Greece' to the European Union, is a crucial landmark in the Europeanization process of the OCG, which reflects the aspiration of the latter to participate in the European process. It is a service abroad of the Holy Synod designed to represent the OCG in the EU.") Orthodox Churches in Europe commemorated the 550th anniversary of the Fall of Constantinople in May; (Note: "THE HORRIFIC event of the Fall itself falls into the domain of the unreachable judgments of the Wisdom of God, which transcend human understanding, represents the open wound of the Orthodox Christian conscience, but it is also a confirmation of the eternal truth, that the "image of this world" is passing, while at the same time a confirmation of the indestructibility of the One, Holy, Catholic and Apostolic Church, according to the promise of Christ. REMEMBERING, therefore, the Fall of Constantinople, we venerate the wounds of the Crucified Lord and confirm ourselves in the power of His Resurrection, witnessing before all peoples Him as the Stone, which the builders rejected and reject, and He has become the "Cornerstone, and this is marvelous in our eyes". In that name we offer brotherly veneration to Your Beatitude and to all the participants in the convocation marking the 550th Anniversary of the Fall of Constantinople, greeting you with the joyous Paschal greeting: "CHRIST IS RISEN!") the Greek Minister of Culture Evangelos Venizelos informs Europarliament session that the status of the monasteries on Holy Mount Athos and its way of life will remain unchanged, citing official recognition of this status fixed in Article 105 of the Greek Constitution and also legally confirmed in the special Athens Treaty clause specifying conditions on which Greece joined the European Union; (Note: "The Common Declaration on Mount Athos attached to the Treaty of entry of Greece to the EEC (1 January 1981) recognises the special status of Mount Athos as this is defined in article 105 of the Greek Constitution. Consequently, EU takes into consideration this status and particularly on matters of taxation exemption and rights of installation.") Abp. Christodoulos (Paraskevaides) of Athens has falling out with Ecumenical Patriarch Bartholomew over who should have the final say in the appointment of bishops in northern Greece, but rift is mended three weeks later; (Note: The Greek church has since 1928 had administrative, but not titular, control over several dioceses in northern Greece – including Thessaloniki.) in February, the Holy Synod of the Greek Orthodox Church issued a statement opposing the threat of war in Iraq; the Church of Greece sent more than 20 tons in humanitarian aid for the refugees of the war in Iraq to be distributed along the Jordanian-Iraqi border; the proposal to build a mosque outside Athens before the 2004 Olympics was blocked due to opposition from residents and Greece's Orthodox Church which disagreed with the location and plans for the funding for the multimillion-pound mosque to come from Saudi Arabia's King Fahd; the 5th Academic Meeting between Judaism And Orthodox Christianity was held in Thessaloniki, Greece, on 27–29 May; Inter-Orthodox Consultation on the Draft Constitutional Treaty of the European Union is held in Herakleion, Crete, from 18 to 19 March 2003; death of Elder Serapheim Savvaitis (8 January / 26 December), Hegumen of the Holy Lavra of Saint Sabbas the Sanctified (1957-2003). (Note: Schema-Archimandrite Serapheim (Travassaros) of the Holy Lavra of St. Sabbas the Sanctified (Bethlehem), also Serapheim Savvaitis the "Elder of the Desert", 1900 – 8 January 2003, was the Igumen and Spiritual Father of the Holy Lavra of Saint Sabbas the Sanctified in Palestine from 1957-2003, and the founder of the Holy Sanctuary of the Shepherds’ Field in Beit Sahour (a Metochion of the Holy Lavra of St. Sabbas, begun in 1971 and consecrated in 1989). He was buried in the Lavra of Saint Savvas which he served for more than 70 years. Elder Seraphim had been recently honored by Patriarch Irenaios of Jerusalem with the Order of the Grand Cross (Greek: Μεγαλόσταυρος).)
- 2004 In September, a helicopter carrying Patr. Petros VII (Papapetrou) of Alexandria along with 16 others (including 3 other bishops of the Church of Alexandria) crashed into the Aegean Sea while en route to the monastic community of Mount Athos with no survivors; on 8 October the Holy Synod of the Orthodox Church of Greece decided to restore the female diaconate for senior nuns in monasteries; (Note: The Holy Synod decided that women could be promoted to the diaconate only in remote monasteries and at the discretion of individual bishops...The document does not use the word ordination, but specifically allows bishops to consecrate (kathosiosi) senior nuns in monasteries of their eparchies. But bishops who choose to promote women to the diaconate have only the ancient Byzantine liturgy that performs the same cheirotonia, laying on of hands, for deaconesses as in each major order: bishop, priest and deacon. Even so, some (mostly Western) scholars have argued that the historical ordination of women deacons was not a cheirotonia, or ordination to major orders, but a cheirothesia, a blessing that signifies installation to a minor order.) more than two years after he was elected to the post, Israel stated that it would recognise Patr. Irineos I as the Greek Orthodox Patriarch of Jerusalem, after a long-standing refusal to endorse Irineos, describing him as the "candidate of the Palestinians." (Note: The church had accused Israel of violating religious freedom by rejecting its candidates and of "unacceptable interference" in the life of the Greek Orthodox Patriarchate of Jerusalem. Under an 1875 Ottoman law, as well as another passed in 1958 by the Jordanian authorities who ruled east Jerusalem, political authorities in the Holy Land have the right to oversee candidates for the position of patriarch.)

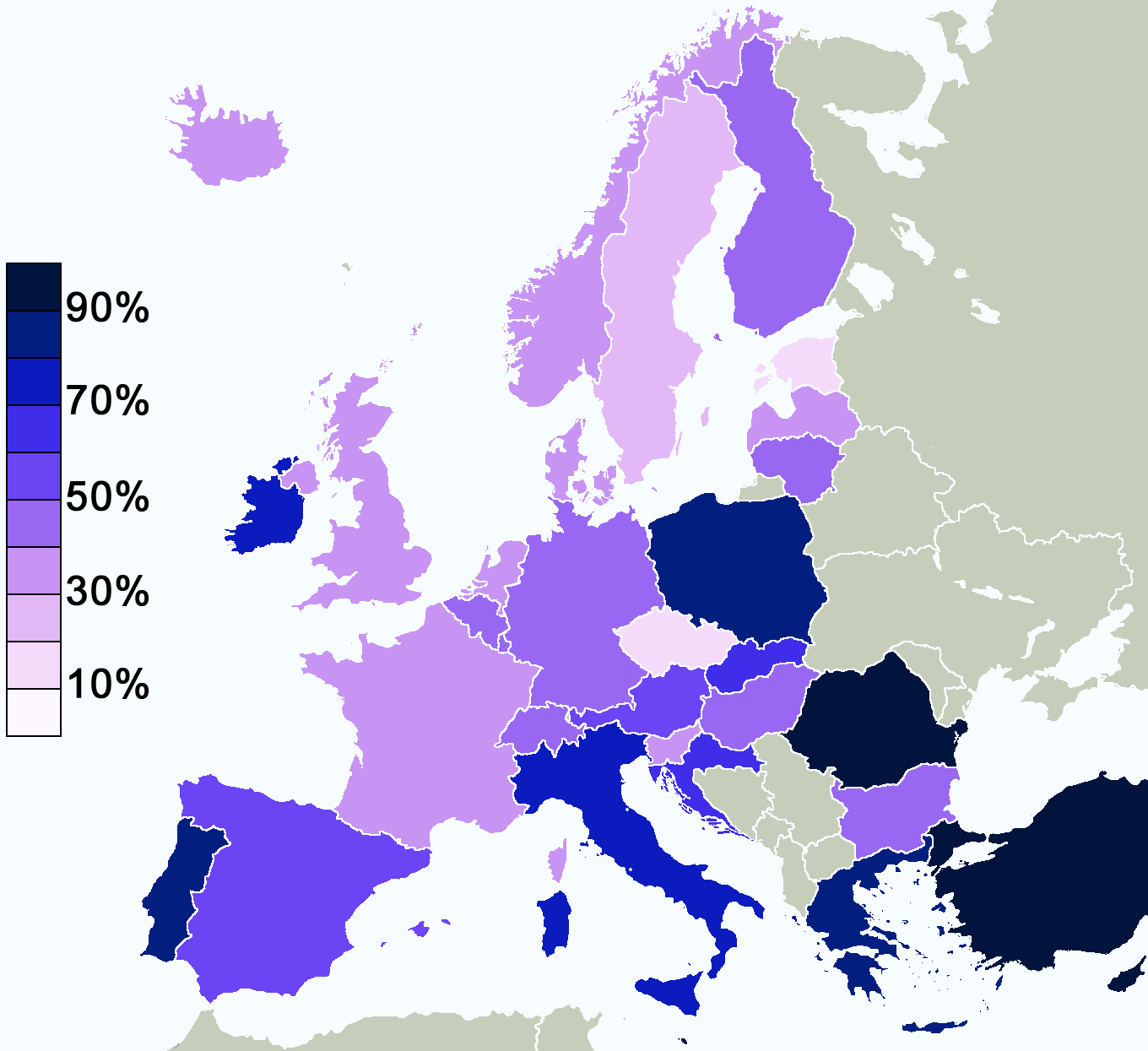
Belief in a God per country (Special Eurobarometer Report, 2005). Four in five respondents in Greece (81%) agreed with the statement "I believe there is a God".

- 2005 Church of Greece hosted the WCC World Conference on Mission and Evangelism in Athens, the first in an Orthodox country in the history of this body; the Ecumenical Patriarchate issued the "General Regulations for the Establishment and Operation of Holy Monasteries in the Greek Orthodox Archdiocese of America" [Protocol #95] on 16 February, regulating monasticism in America; Britain's Prince Charles arrived on the monastic community of Mount Athos for a three-day visit in May; Vladimir Putin becomes the first Russian state leader to visit Mount Athos; in October, the "Grey Wolves" Turkish terrorist group staged a rally outside the Ecumenical Patriarchate in Phanar, proceeding to the gate where they laid a black wreath, chanting "Patriarch Leave" and "Patriarchate to Greece", inaugurating the campaign for the collection of signatures to oust the Ecumenical Patriarchate from Istanbul. (Note: "Ecumenical Patriarch Bartholomew is a favorite target of the ultra-right Nationalist Movement Party (Milliyetci Hareket Partisi: MHP), also known as "Grey Wolves", and of other extreme Islamic organizations. The nationalist organization Noel Baba, a branch of the Grey Wolves, claims that it has accumulated more than five-million signatures for the withdrawal of the Ecumenical Patriarch from Constantinople. Further, Noel Baba Foundation and Peace Council Chairman, Muammer Karabulut, and the General Secretary of the Union of Public Office Employees in Turkey, who is a member of the organization, promoted the issue of the withdrawal of the Ecumenical Patriarch from Constantinople and continue to present the petition signatures to the President of Turkey, Ahmet Necdet Sezer (from May 2000).")
- 2006 Abp. Christodoulos (Paraskevaides) of Athens visits Vatican, the first head of the Church of Greece to visit the Vatican, reciprocating the Pope's visit to Greece in 2001, signing a Joint Declaration on the importance of the Christian roots of Europe and protecting fundamental human rights; (Note: After a private lunch with the pontiff, Christodoulos was expected later Thursday to receive a papal gift of two metal links from the chain believed to have bound the Apostle Paul prior to his execution by the Romans.) Abp. Christodoulos castigated globalisation as a "crime against humanity"; Abp. Christodoulos welcomed the imminent arrival of millions of Orthodox faithful from Bulgaria and Romania into the EU from 1 January 2007, saying the influx "will strengthen the voice of Orthodoxy" to address a perceived threat to national and religious identity posed by globalisation; foundation of the Special Synodic Committee for Migrants, Refugees and Returning Migrants (SCMRM) at the initiative of Abp. Christodoulos, following the approval of the Holy Synod in Nov. 2006; (Note: The role of this Committee, which is composed of university professors and jurists specialized in migration issues, consists primarily in studying and programming pastoral oriented policies aiming at the efficient social integration of migrants. It also has a counselling role towards the Holy Synod of the OCG, and is further in charge of commenting draft laws, and legal texts in the domains of immigration.) Prime Minister Costas Karamanlis took a three-day pilgrimage to Mount Athos; Pope Benedict XVI met with Greek Orthodox Seminarians from the Apostoliki Diakonia theology college in Greece who were visiting Rome, urging them to confront the challenges that threaten the faith by working to unify all Christians; the church reported that there were 216 men's monastic communities and 259 for women along with 66 sketes, with a total of 1,041 monks and 2,500 nuns, witnessing to a modern modest revival in monasticism; in September, barely 48 hours after a Somali Islamic cleric called for Muslims to kill the Pope, Abp. Christodoulos told a sermon in Athens that Christians in Africa were suffering at the hands of "fanatic Islamists", citing the example of Roman Catholic monks who were slaughtered the previous year "because they wore the cross and believed in our crucified Lord"; Abp. Christodoulos criticized the authors of a state issued elementary school sixth grade history textbook, as attempting to conceal the Church's role in defending Greek national identity during Ottoman occupation, the book being later removed in 2007; (Note: The infamous school history textbook for 11-year-olds was finally withdrawn by Greece's new education minister Evripides Stylianides in 2007. Supporters of the textbook denounced its withdrawal as being due to 'nationalism and religious fundamentalism', however Greece's Orthodox Church leader and academics correctly identified it as an attempt to rewrite Greek history to make it 'more inclusive', in which pivotal events in Greek history – such as the Greek War of Independence and the role of the Church in the uprising, the burning of Smyrna (1922), the Istanbul Pogrom (1955), the Cypriot campaign for enosis and the Turkish invasion and occupation of Cyprus – were omitted or glossed over. Abp. Christodoulos welcomed the news, stating: "The Church was first...to resist this distortion by the doubters of historical facts.") death of Elder Athanasios Mitilinaios, having authored thousands of recorded lectures in the spirit of patristic traditional Orthodoxy; a ruling by a first-instance court in Athens approved the formation of an association of people who worship the 12 gods of Mount Olympus, linked to New Age practises by the Church of Greece; government of Greece announces it will fund and build a €15 million (US$19 million) new mosque in Athens, to be the first working mosque in the Greek capital since the end of Ottoman rule over 170 years prior, welcomed by Abp. Christodoulos (Paraskevaides) of Athens and the Church of Greece in accordance with its established position.
- 2007 The 1600th anniversary celebration of the repose of John Chrysostom; Greek Minority Lyceum at the Phanar (Megali tou Genous Sxoli, today a middle and high school of the Greek minority) wins a judgement condemning Turkey at the European Court of Human Rights (ECHR), for violation of the European Convention On Human Rights (protection of property); (Note: "On 9 January 2007, the ECHR issued a judgement condemning Turkey for violation of article 1 of Additional Protocol 1 of the European Convention On Human Rights (protection of property), and called upon Turkey, within three months of the day on which the Courts judgement becomes final, either to return the property to its legitimate owners or pay damages in the amount of 890,000 and 20,000 for costs and expenses. The Court took its final decision on 9 April 2007, with which Turkey is under an obligation to comply by 9 July 2007. This decision is of particular importance, mainly because it condemns a decades-long Turkish practice and the relevant court decision of 1974, based on which minority religious foundations are not recognised as the owners of real estate obtained after 1936.") the International Association of Genocide Scholars (IAGS) passed a resolution affirming "that the Ottoman campaign against Christian minorities of the Empire between 1914 and 1923 constituted a genocide against Armenians, Assyrians, and Pontian and Anatolian Greeks"; (Note: In 2007, the International Association of Genocide Scholars passed a resolution that "The Ottoman campaign against Christian minorities of the Empire between 1914 and 1923 constituted a genocide against Armenians, Assyrians, and Pontian and Anatolian Greeks." The vote in favor was 83%. FULL TEXT OF THE IAGS RESOLUTION: "WHEREAS the denial of genocide is widely recognized as the final stage of genocide, enshrining impunity for the perpetrators of genocide, and demonstrably paving the way for future genocides; WHEREAS the Ottoman genocide against minority populations during and following the First World War is usually depicted as a genocide against Armenians alone, with little recognition of the qualitatively similar genocides against other Christian minorities of the Ottoman Empire; BE IT RESOLVED that it is the conviction of the International Association of Genocide Scholars that the Ottoman campaign against Christian minorities of the Empire between 1914 and 1923 constituted a genocide against Armenians, Assyrians, and Pontian and Anatolian Greeks. BE IT FURTHER RESOLVED that the Association calls upon the government of Turkey to acknowledge the genocides against these populations, to issue a formal apology, and to take prompt and meaningful steps toward restitution.") Representation of the Church of Cyprus to the European Union is established by decision of the Holy Synod of the Church of Cyprus; New English Translation of the Septuagint (NETS) is published by the International Organization for Septuagint and Cognate Studies (IOSCS), based on the best critical editions of the Septuagint, primarily the larger Göttingen Septuagint; a half-finished painting in the Church of the Holy Virgin in Axioupolis, northern Greece, of Russian communist leader Vladimir Lenin cutting off the beard of St Luke (Voino-Yasenetsky), painted as a symbol of communist oppression of the Church, offended traditionalists who wanted it removed.
- 2008 Death of Abp. Christodoulos (Paraskevaides) of Athens, proving to be one of the most popular archbishops in Greek history, reviving the appeal of the Church in a secular age, especially among young people; (Note: His death has been questioned. On 16 June 2013, on the Skai TV program «Ελεύθερος Σκοπευτής», Greek journalist and television and radio broadcaster George Tragas discussed the question of the murder of Abp. Christodoulos with a panel of guests. In addition, in February 2016, on the 8th anniversary of Abp. Christodoulos' death, one of his closest associates, Archimandrite Epiphanius Economou publicly stressed that "Christodoulos was not supposed to live and that is why he is not alive", implying that the Archbishop’s death was not accidental. "It is no coincidence that everything started (in Greece) from the day after his death. In the beginning I did not want to believe it, but now I believe it" he said.)

== See also ==
- Eastern Orthodoxy in Greece
- List of archbishops of Athens
- Greek Orthodox Church
- Eastern Orthodox Church organization

History

- History of the Eastern Orthodox Church
- History of Eastern Christianity
- History of the Eastern Orthodox Church under the Ottoman Empire
- History of Eastern Orthodox Churches in the 20th century
- Timeline of Eastern Orthodoxy in America

Church Fathers

- Apostolic Fathers
- Church Fathers
- Ante-Nicene Fathers (book)
- Desert Fathers
- Nicene and Post-Nicene Fathers
- List of Church Fathers

== Bibliography ==
- Giannēs Koliopoulos and Thanos Veremēs. Greece: The Modern Sequel, from 1831 to the Present. NYU Press, 2002. 407 pp. ISBN 9780814747674
- Anastasios Anastassiadis. Religion and Politics in Greece: The Greek Church's 'Conservative Modernization' in the 1990s. Research in Question, No.11, January 2004. (PDF).
- C.M. Woodhouse. Modern Greece. 4th ed. Boston : Faber and Faber, 1986.
- Charalambos K. Papastathis and Nikos Maghioros. "Greece: A Faithful Orthodox Christian State. THE ORTHODOX CHURCH IN THE HELLENIC REPUBLIC." In: Javier Martínez-Torrón and W. Cole Durham, Jr.. Religion and the Secular State: National Reports (Issued for the occasion of the XVIIIth International Congress of Comparative Law, Washington, D.C., July 2010). Published by: Complutense Universidad de Madrid, in cooperation with The International Center for Law and Religion Studies, Brigham Young University. July 2014. pp. 339–375.
- Demetrios J. Constantelos. Understanding the Greek Orthodox Church: Its Faith, History and Life. 4th Edition. Brookline, Mass.: Hellenic College Press, 2005. ISBN 9780917653506
- Dimitri E. Conomos, Graham Speake. Mount Athos, the Sacred Bridge: The Spirituality of the Holy Mountain. Oxford: Peter Lang, 2005.
- Dr. Daphne Halikiopoulou. Patterns of Secularization: Church, State and Nation in Greece and the Republic of Ireland. Ashgate Publishing, Ltd., 2011. ISBN 9781409403456
- Effie Fokas. Religion in the Greek Public Sphere: Nuancing the Account. Journal of Modern Greek Studies. Volume 27, Number 2, October 2009, pp. 349–374.
- Efthymios Nicolaidis. Science and Eastern Orthodoxy: From the Greek Fathers to the Age of Globalization. Transl. Susan Emanuel. Johns Hopkins University Press. 2011. 288 pp. ISBN 978-1421402987
- Herman A. Middleton. Precious Vessels of the Holy Spirit: The Lives & Counsels of Contemporary Elders of Greece. 2nd Ed. Protecting Veil Press, 2004.
- John Hadjinicolaou (Ed.). Synaxis: An Anthology of the Most Significant Orthodox Theology in Greece Appearing in the Journal Synaxē from 1982 to 2002. Montréal : Alexander Press, 2006.
- John L. Tomkinson. Between Heaven and Earth: The Greek Church. Anagnosis Books, Athens, 2004.
- Mother Nectaria McLees. EVLOGEITE! A Pilgrim's Guide to Greece. 1st Ed. St. Nicholas Press, Kansas City, MO, 2002. 927 pp.
- Norman Russell. Modern Greek Theologians and the Greek Fathers. Philosophy & Theology Volume 18, Issue 1. 2007.10.17. Pages 77–92. (ISSN 0890-2461)
- Rev. Dr. Nicon D. Patrinacos (M.A., D.Phil. (Oxon)). A Dictionary of Greek Orthodoxy – Λεξικον Ελληνικης Ορθοδοξιας. Light & Life Publishing, Minnesota, 1984.
- Rev. A. H. Hore. Eighteen centuries of the Orthodox Greek Church. London: James Parker & Co. 1899. 706pp. (Re-printed: Gorgias Press LLC, 2003.)
- Vasilios Makrides (Professor). Hellenic Temples and Christian Churches: A Concise History of the Religious Cultures of Greece from Antiquity to the Present. New York University Press, 2009. 345 pp. ISBN 9780814795682
- Victor Roudometof and Vasilios Makrides (Eds.). Orthodox Christianity in 21st Century Greece: The Role of Religion in Culture, Ethnicity, and Politics. Ashgate Publishing, Ltd., 2010. 258 pp. ISBN 9780754666967
