= John Romanides =

American Eastern Orthodox priest

The Reverend John Romanides
- Ιωάννης Ρωμανίδης
- Born: John Savvas Romanides; 2 March 1927; Piraeus, Greece
- Died: 1 November 2001 (aged 74); Athens, Greece

Academic background
- Education: Holy Cross Greek Orthodox School of Theology; Yale Divinity School; University of Athens (PhD)
- Thesis: The Ancestral Sin (1957)
- Influences: Georges Florovsky

Academic work
- Discipline: Theologian
- Institutions: See list: Holy Cross Greek Orthodox School of Theology (1956–1965); University of Thessaloniki (1968–1982); University of Balamand (from 1970)

Ordination history
History
Priestly ordination
- Date: 1951

John Savvas Romanides (Greek: Ιωάννης Σάββας Ρωμανίδης; 2 March 1927 – 1 November 2001) was a theologian, Eastern Orthodox priest, and scholar who had a distinctive influence on post-war Greek Orthodox theology.

== Biography ==
John Romanides was born in Piraeus, Greece, on 2 March 1927. He was born to a family of Cappadocian Greeks who had recently left Anatolia as refugees due to the Greek genocide there. He was named after John the Russian, an Orthodox saint associated with the family's village in Anatolia. His family emigrated to the United States when he was only two months old. He grew up in New York, and after completing high school he decided to attend seminary. He went to Holy Cross Greek Orthodox School of Theology, in Brookline, Massachusetts, and graduated in 1949.

Romanides was ordained an Orthodox priest in 1951, working at a parish in Connecticut until 1954. He enrolled in Yale Divinity School, earning a masters degree in theology there, but also studied at the St. Sergius School of Theology, Columbia University, and St. Vladimir's seminary. It was at the last institution where Romanides was taught by Georges Florovsky, who would become an academic mentor of his. In 1955, Romanides moved to Greece to pursue a PhD at the University of Athens. His thesis, titled The Ancestral Sin, was completed there in 1957.

From 1956 to 1965, Romanides was Professor of Dogmatic Theology at the Holy Cross Theological School in Brookline, Massachusetts. While teaching there, he helped establish both the Holy Transfiguration and Holy Nativity monasteries in Boston. In 1968 he was appointed as tenured professor of Dogmatic Theology at the University of Thessaloniki, Greece, a position he held until his retirement in 1982. From 1970, Romanaides was a Professor of Theology at the University of Balamand, in Lebanon.

Romanides died in Athens, Greece on 1 November 2001.

== Theology ==
Romanides belonged to the "theological generation of the 1960s", which pleaded for a "return to the Fathers", and led to "the acute polarization of the East-West divide and the cultivation of an anti-Western, anti-ecumenical sentiment." According to Kalaitzidis, his early theological interests are "wide and broad-minded", but narrowed with the publication of Romiosini in 1975, which postulates an absolute divide between the Eastern Churches and the Western Church: "[h]ereafter, the West is wholly demonized and proclaimed responsible for all the misfortunes of the Orthodox, both theological and historical/national."

Romanides contributed many speculations, some controversial, into the cultural and religious differences between Eastern and Western Christianity. According to Romanides, these divergences have impacted the ways in which Christianity has developed and been lived out in the Christian cultures of East and West. According to Romanides, these divergences were due to the influences of the Franks, who were culturally very different from the Romans. (Note: "The Filioque controversy was not a conflict between the Patriarchates of Old Rome and New Rome, but between the Franks and all Romans in the East and in the West.")

His theological works emphasize the empirical (experiential) (Note: Metropolitan Hierotheos Vlachos: "The vision of the uncreated light, which offers knowledge of God to man, is sensory and supra-sensory. The bodily eyes are reshaped, so they see the uncreated light, 'this mysterious light, inaccessible, immaterial, uncreated, deifying, eternal', this 'radiance of the Divine Nature, this glory of the divinity, this beauty of the heavenly kingdom' (3,1,22;CWS p.80). Palamas asks: 'Do you see that light is inaccessible to senses which are not transformed by the Spirit?' (2,3,22). St. Maximus, whose teaching is cited by St. Gregory, says that the Apostles saw the uncreated Light 'by a transformation of the activity of their senses, produced in them by the Spirit' (2.3.22).") basis of theology called theoria or vision of God, (as opposed to a rational or reasoned understanding of theory) as the essence of Orthodox theology, setting it "apart from all other religions and traditions", especially the Frankish-dominated western Church which distorted this true spiritual path. Studying extensively the works of 14th-century Byzantine theologian St. Gregory Palamas, he stated religion to be identical with sickness, and the so-called Jesus prayer (Note: "Romanidian theology" prefers Greek: νοερά προσευχή, romanized: noera prosefchi, lit. 'noetic prayer': "χρησιμοποιούμεν τους όρους 'νοερά ενέργεια' και 'νοερά προσευχή'", 'we use the terms "noetic faculty" and "noetic prayer"'. (Note: "To be travelling uphill to glorification on the vehicle of noetic prayer is the process of cure, and to reach glorification is the taste of the beginning of health and perfection. At the same time this glorification is the revelation of all truth by the Holy Spirit.")) of hesychasm to be both the cure of this sickness and the core of Christian tradition: (Note: "While the brain is the center of human adaptation to the environment, the noetic faculty in the heart is the primary organ for communion with God. The fall of man or the state of inherited sin is: a.) the failure of the noetic faculty to function properly, or to function at all; b.) its confusion with the functions of the brain and the body in general; and c.) its resulting enslavement to the environment. Each individual experiences the fall of his own noetic faculty. One can see why the Augustinian understanding of the fall of man as an inherited guilt for the sin of Adam and Eve is not, and cannot, be accepted by the Orthodox tradition. There are two known memory systems built into living beings, 1.) cell memory which determines the function and development of the individual in relation to itself, and 2.) brain cell memory which determines the function of the individual in relation to its environment. In addition to this, the patristic tradition is aware of the existence in human beings of a now normally non-functioning or sub-functioning memory in the heart, which when put into action via noetic prayer, includes unceasing memory of God, and therefore, the normalization of all other relations. When the noetic faculty is not functioning properly, man is enslaved to fear an anxiety and his relations to others are essentially utilitarian. Thus, the root cause of all abnormal relations between God and man and among me is that fallen man, i.e., man with a malfunctioning noetic faculty, uses God, his fellow man, and nature for his own understanding of security and happiness. Man outside of glorification imagines the existence of god or gods which are psychological projections of his need for security and happiness. That all men have this noetic faculty in the heart also means that all are in direct relation to God at various levels, depending on how much the individual personality resists enslavement to his physical and social surroundings and allows himself to be directed by God. Every individual is sustained by the uncreated glory of God and is the dwelling place of this uncreated glory of God and is the dwelling place of this uncreated creative and sustaining light, which is called the rule, power, grace, etc. of God. Human reaction to this direct relation or communion with God can range from the hardening of the heart (i.e., the snuffing out of the spark of grace) to the experience of glorification attained to by the prophets, apostles, and saints. This means that all men are equal in possession of the noetic faculty, but not in quality or degree of function. It is important to not the clear distinction between spirituality, which is rooted primarily in the heart's noetic faculty, and intellectuality, which is rooted in the brain. Thus: 1.) A person with little intellectual attainments can raise to the highest level of noetic perfection. 2..) On the other hand, a man of the highest intellectual attainments can fall to the lowest level of noetic imperfection. 3.) One may also reach both the highest intellectual attainments and noetic perfection. Or 4.) One may be of meager intellectual accomplishment with the hardening of the heart. The role of Christianity was originally more like that of the medical profession, especially that of today's psychologists and psychiatrists. Man has a malfunctioning or non-functioning noetic faculty in the heart, and it is the task especially of the clergy to apply the cure of unceasing memory of God, otherwise called unceasing prayer or illumination. Proper preparation for vision of God takes place in two stages: purification, and illumination of the noetic faculty.")

The leadership of the Roman Empire had come to realize that religion is a sickness whose cure was the heart and core of the Christian tradition they had been persecuting. [...] This very cure of fantasies is the core of the Orthodox tradition. These fantasies arise from a short circuit between the nervous system centered in the brain and the blood system centered in the heart. The cure of this short circuit is noetic prayer (noera proseuche) which functions in tandem with rational or intellectual prayer of the brain which frees one from fantasies which the devil uses to enslave his victims. Note: We are still searching the Fathers for the term 'Jesus prayer'. We would very much appreciate it if someone could come up with a patristic quote in Greek.

His research on dogmatic theology led him to the conclusion of a close link between doctrinal differences and historical developments. Thus, in his later years, he concentrated on historical research, mostly of the Middle Ages but also of the 18th and 19th centuries.

=== Augustine of Hippo ===
Romanides sees St Augustine as the great antagonist of Orthodox thought. Romanides claims that, although he was a saint, Augustine did not have theoria. Many of his theological conclusions, Romanides says, appear not to come from experiencing God and writing about his experiences of God; rather, they appear to be the result of philosophical or logical speculation and conjecture. (Note: "A basic characteristic of the Frankish scholastic method, mislead by Augustinian Platonism and Thomistic Aristotelianism, had been its naive confidence in the objective existence of things rationally speculated about. By following Augustine, the Franks substituted the patristic concern for spiritual observation, (which they had found firmly established in Gaul when they first conquered the area) with a fascination for metaphysics. They did not suspect that such speculations had foundations neither in created nor in spiritual reality. No one would today accept as true what is not empirically observable, or at least verifiable by inference, from an attested effect. So it is with patristic theology. Dialectical speculation about God and the Incarnation as such are rejected. Only those things which can be tested by the experience of the grace of God in the heart are to be accepted. 'Be not carried about by divers and strange teachings. For it is good that the heart be confirmed by grace', a passage from Hebrews 13.9, quoted by the Fathers to this effect." [Emphasis added.]) Hence, Augustine is still revered as a saint, but, according to Romanides, does not qualify as a theologian in the Eastern Orthodox church.

==== Original sin versus ancestral sin ====
Romanides rejects the Roman Catholic teachings on Original Sin. Orthodox theologians trace this position to having its roots in the works of Saint Augustine. Eastern Orthodoxy, Oriental Orthodoxy, and the Assyrian Church of the East, which together make up Eastern Christianity, contemplate that the introduction of ancestral sin into the human race affected the subsequent environment for humanity, but never accepted Augustine of Hippo's notions of original sin and hereditary guilt. It holds that original sin does not have the character of a personal fault in any of Adam's descendants.

==== Rejection of St. Augustine ====
Eastern Orthodox theologians John Romanides and George Papademetriou say that some of Augustine's teachings were actually condemned as those of Barlaam the Calabrian at the Hesychast or Fifth Council of Constantinople 1351. It is the vision or revelation of God (theoria) that gives one knowledge of God. (Note: "The Latins' weakness to comprehend and failure to express the dogma of the Trinity shows the non-existence of empirical theology. The three disciples of Christ (Peter, James and John) beheld the glory of Christ on Mount Tabor; they heard at once the voice of the Father: 'this is my beloved Son' and saw the coming of the Holy Spirit in a cloud — for, the cloud is the presence of the Holy Spirit, as St. Gregory Palamas says —. Thus the disciples of Christ acquired the knowledge of the Triune God in theoria (vision) and by revelation. It was revealed to them that God is one essence in three hypostases. This is what St. Symeon the New Theologian teaches. In his poems he proclaims over and over that while beholding the uncreated Light, the deified man acquires the Revelation of God the Trinity. Being in 'theoria' (vision of God), the Saints do not confuse the hypostatic attributes. The fact that the Latin tradition came to the point of confusing these hypostatic attributes and teach that the Holy Spirit proceeds from the Son also, shows the non-existence of empirical theology for them. Latin tradition speaks also of created grace, a fact which suggests that there is no experience of the grace of God. For, when man obtains the experience of God, then he comes to understand well that this grace is uncreated. Without this experience there can be no genuine 'therapeutic tradition'.") Theoria, contemplatio in Latin, as indicated by John Cassian, meaning vision of God, is closely connected with theosis (divinization). (Note: "Theoria: Theoria is the vision of the glory of God. Theoria is identified with the vision of the uncreated Light, the uncreated energy of God, with the union of man with God, with man's theosis (see note below). Thus, theoria, vision and theosis are closely connected. Theoria has various degrees. There is illumination, vision of God, and constant vision (for hours, days, weeks, even months). Noetic prayer is the first stage of theoria. Theoretical man is one who is at this stage. In Patristic theology, the theoretical man is characterised as the shepherd of the sheep.")

John Romanides reports that Augustinian theology is generally ignored in the Eastern Orthodox church. (Note: "The province of Gaul was the battleground between the followers of Augustine and of Saint John Cassian, when the Franks were taking over the province and transforming it into their Francia. Through his monastic movement and his writings in this field and on Christology, Saint John Cassian had a strong influence on the Church in Old Rome also. In his person, as in other persons such as Ambrose, Jerome, Rufinus, Leo the Great, and Gregory the Great, we have an identity in doctrine, theology, and spirituality between the East and West Roman Christians. Within this framework, Augustine in the West Roman area was subjected to general Roman theology. In the East Roman area, Augustine was simply ignored.") Romanides claims that the Roman Catholic Church, starting with Augustine, has removed the mystical experience (revelation) of God (theoria) from Christianity and replaced it with the conceptualization of revelation through the philosophical speculation of metaphysics. (Note: "18. Indeed, some centuries earlier, just after the Norman conquest, the second Lombard Archbishop of Canterbury Anselm (1093-1109) was not happy with Augustine's use of procession in his De Trinitate XV, 47, i.e. that the Holy Spirit proceeds principaliter from the Father or from the Father per Filium. (See Anselm's own De fide Trinitate chapters 15, 16 and 24). This West Roman Orthodox Filioque, which upset Anselm so much, could not be added to the creed of 381 where "procession" there means hypostatic individuality and not the communion of divine essence as in Augustine's Filioque just quoted. Augustine is indeed Orthodox by intention by his willingness to be corrected. The real problem is that he does not theologize from the vantage point of personal theosis or glorification, but as one who speculates philosophically on the Bible with no real basis in the Patristic tradition. Furthermore, his whole theological method is based on happiness as the destiny of man instead of biblical glorification. His resulting method of analogia entis and analogia fidei is not accepted by any Orthodox Father of the Church. In any case no Orthodox can accept positions of Augustine on which the Father's of Ecumenical Councils are in agreement 'against' him. This website is not concerned with whether Augustine is a saint or a Father of the Church. There is no doubt that he was Orthodox by intention and asked for correction. However, he can not be used in such a way that his opinions may be put on an equal footing with the Fathers of Ecumenical Councils.") Romanides does not consider the metaphysics of Augustine to be Orthodox but Pagan mysticism. (Note: "11. In sharp contrast to this Augustinian tradition is that of the Old and the New Testament as understood by the Fathers of the Roman Ecumenical Councils. The 'spirit' of man in the Old and New Testaments is that which is sick and which in the patristic tradition became also known as 'the noetic energy' or 'faculty'. By this adjustment in terminology this tradition of cure became more intelligible to the Hellenic mind. Now a further adjustment may be made by calling this sick human 'spirit' or 'noetic faculty' a 'neurobiological faculty or energy' grounded in the heart, but which has been short circuited by its attachment to the nervous system centered in the brain thus creating fantasies about things which either do not exist or else do exist but not as one imagines. This very cure of fantasies is the core of the Orthodox tradition. These fantasies arise from a short circuit between the nervous system centered in the brain and the blood system centered in the heart. The cure of this short circuit is noetic prayer (noera proseuche) which functions in tandem with rational or intellectual prayer of the brain which frees one from fantasies which the devil uses to enslave his victims. Note: We are still searching the Fathers for the term 'Jesus prayer'. We would very much appreciate it if someone could come up with a patristic quote in Greek. 12. In sharp contrast to this tradition is that of Augustinian Platonism which searches for mystical experiences within supposed transcendental realities by liberating the mind from the confines of the body and material reality for imaginary flights into a so-called metaphysical dimension of so-called divine ideas which do not exist. 14. Orthodox Fathers of the Church are those who practice the specific Old and New Testament cure of this sickness of religion. Those who do not practice this cure, but on the contrary have introduced such practices as pagan mysticism, are not Fathers within this tradition. Orthodox Theology is not 'mystical', but 'secret' (mystike). The reason for this name 'Secret' is that the glory of God in the experience of glorification (theosis) has no similarity whatsoever with anything created. On the contrary the Augustinians imagine that they are being united with uncreated original ideas of God of which creatures are supposedly copies and which simply do not exist." [Emphasis added.]) Romanides states that Augustine's Platonic mysticism was condemned by the Eastern Orthodox within the church condemnation of Barlaam of Calabria at the Hesychast councils in Constantinople. (Note: "9. The Ninth Ecumenical Council of 1341 condemned the Platonic mysticism of Barlaam the Calabrian who had come from the West as a convert to Orthodoxy. Of course the rejection of Platonic type of mysticism was traditional practice for the Fathers. But what the Fathers of this Council were completely shocked at was Barlaam's claim that God reveals His will by bringing into existence creatures to be seen and heard and which He passes back into non existence after His revelation has been received. One of these supposed creatures was the Angel of The Lord Himself Who appeared to Moses in the burning bush. For the Fathers of the Ecumenical Councils this Angel is the uncreated Logos Himself. This unbelievable nonsense of Barlaam turned out to be that of Augustine himself. (see e.g. his De Tinitate, Books A and B) and of the whole Franco-Latin tradition till today.")

==== Criticism ====
The Greek Old Calendarist, Archimandrite [later Archbishop] Chrysostomos González of Etna, CA, criticized Romanides' criticism of Augustine: (Note: Book review of Rose, 1997.)

In certain ultra-conservative Orthodox circles in the United States, there has developed an unfortunate bitter and harsh attitude toward one of the great Fathers of the Church, the blessed (Saint) Augustine of Hippo (354–430 A.D.). These circles, while clearly outside the mainstream of Orthodox thought and careful scholarship, have often been so vociferous and forceful in their statements that their views have touched and even affected more moderate and stable Orthodox believers and thinkers. Not a few writers and spiritual aspirants have been disturbed by this trend.

=== Heaven and Hell ===
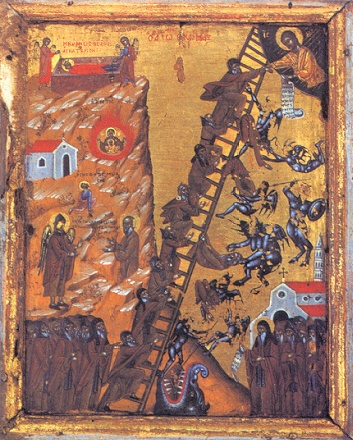
Icon of monks falling into the mouth of a dragon representing hell

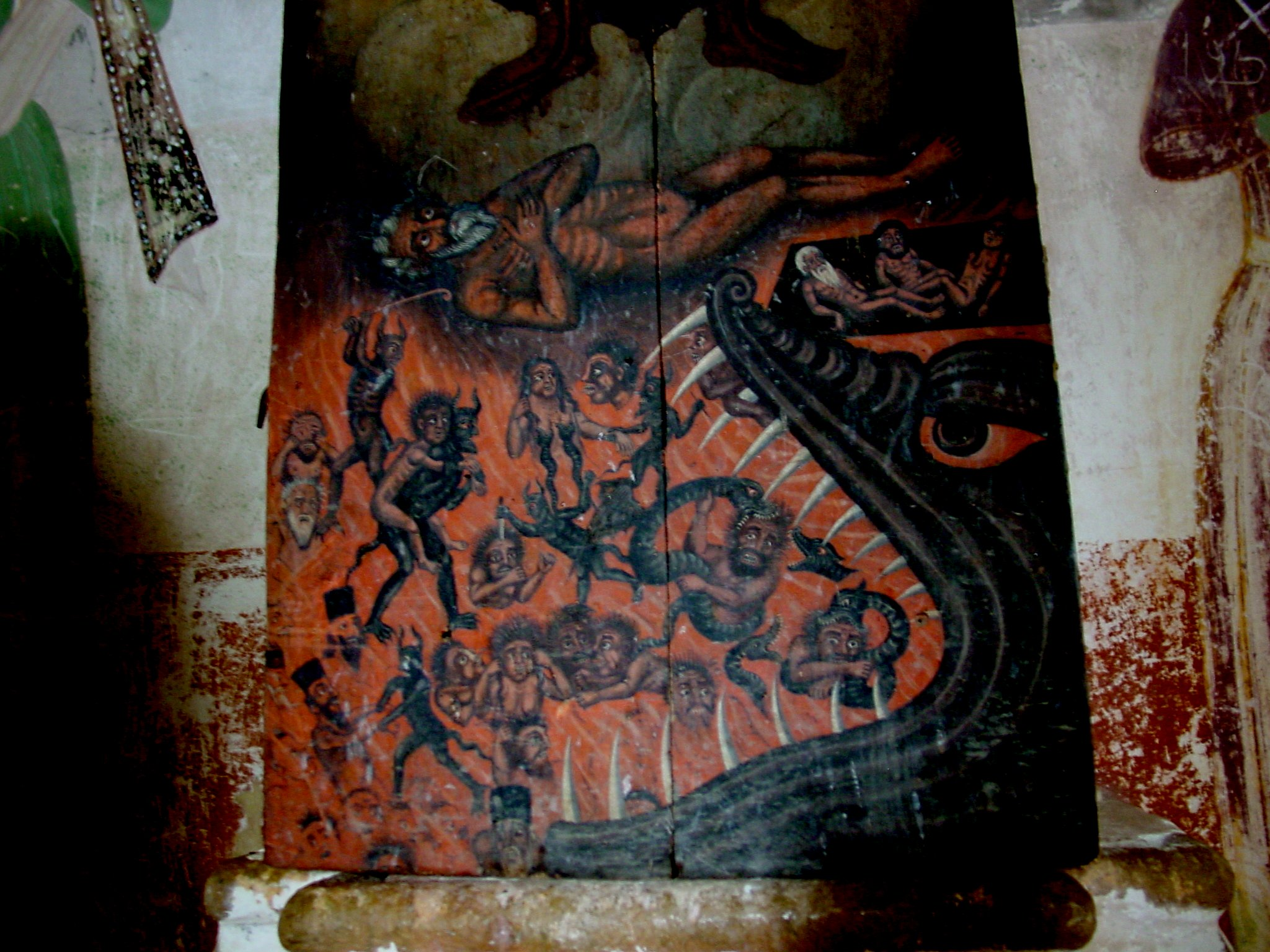
Icon of hell

According to Romanides, the theological concept of hell, or eternal damnation is expressed differently within Eastern and Western Christianity. According to John S. Romanides, "the Frankish [i.e. Western] understanding of heaven and hell" is "foreign to the Orthodox tradition". (Note: Romanides: "Having reached this point, we will turn our attention to those aspects of differences between Roman and Frankish theologies which have had a strong impact on the development of difference is the doctrine of the Church. The basic difference may be listed under diagnosis of spiritual ills and their therapy. Glorification is the vision of God in which the equality of all men and the absolute value of each man is experienced. God loves all men equally and indiscriminately, regardless of even their moral statues. God loves with the same love, both the saint and the devil. To teach otherwise, as Augustine and the Franks did, would be adequate proof that they did not have the slightest idea of what glorification was. God multiplies and divides himself in His uncreated energies undividedly among divided things, so that He is both present by act and absent by nature to each individual creature and everywhere present and absent at the same time. This is the fundamental mystery of the presence of God to His creatures and shows that universals do not exist in God and are, therefore, not part of the state of illumination as in the Augustinian tradition. God himself is both heaven and hell, reward and punishment. All men have been created to see God unceasingly in His uncreated glory. Whether God will be for each man heaven or hell, reward or punishment, depends on man's response to God's love and on man's transformation from the state of selfish and self-centered love, to Godlike love which does not seek its own ends. One can see how the Frankish understanding of heaven and hell, poetically described by Dante, John Milton, and James Joyce, are so foreign to the Orthodox tradition. This is another of the reasons why the so-called humanism of some East Romans (those who united with the Frankish papacy) was a serious regression and not an advance in culture. Since all men will see God, no religion can claim for itself the power to send people either to heaven or to hell. This means that true spiritual fathers prepare their spiritual charges so that vision of God's glory will be heaven, and not hell, reward and not punishment. The primary purpose of Orthodox Christianity then, is to prepare its members for an experience which every human being will sooner or later have." [Emphasis added.])

According to Romanides, the Orthodox Church teaches that both Heaven and Hell are being in God's presence, which is being with God and seeing God, and that there is no such place as where God is not, nor is Hell taught in the East as separation from God. One expression of the Eastern teaching is that hell and heaven are being in God's presence, as this presence is punishment and paradise depending on the person's spiritual state in that presence. (Note: "Man has a malfunctioning or non-functioning noetic faculty in the heart, and it is the task especially of the clergy to apply the cure of unceasing memory of God, otherwise called unceasing prayer or illumination." "Those who have selfless love and are friends of God see God 'in light - divine darkness', while the selfish and impure see God the judge as 'fire - darkness'.") For one who hates God, to be in the presence of God eternally would be the gravest suffering. Aristotle Papanikolaou and Elizabeth H. Prodromou wrote in their book Thinking Through Faith: New Perspectives from Orthodox Christian Scholars that for the Orthodox the theological symbols of heaven and hell are not crudely understood as spatial destinations but rather refer to the experience of God's presence according to two different modes.

The saved and the damned will both experience God's light, the Tabor light. However, the saved will experience this light as Heaven, while the damned will experience it as Hell. (Note: "Paradise and Hell exist not in the form of a threat and a punishment on the part of God but in the form of an illness and a cure. Those who are cured and those who are purified experience the illuminating energy of divine grace, while the uncured and ill experience the caustic energy of God. [...] Those who have selfless love and are friends of God see God in light - divine light, while the selfish and impure see God the judge as fire - darkness.") (Note: "God himself is both heaven and hell, reward and punishment. All men have been created to see God unceasingly in His uncreated glory. Whether God will be for each man heaven or hell, reward or punishment, depends on man's response to God's love and on man's transformation from the state of selfish and self-centered love, to Godlike love which does not seek its own ends. [...] Proper preparation for vision of God takes place in two stages: purification, and illumination of the noetic faculty. Without this, it is impossible for man's selfish love to be transformed into selfless love. This transformation takes place during the higher level of the stage of illumination called theoria, literally meaning vision-in this case vision by means of unceasing and uninterrupted memory of God. Those who remain selfish and self-centered with a hardened heart, closed to God's love, will not see the glory of God in this life. However, they will see God's glory eventually, but as an eternal and consuming fire and outer darkness.") (Note: "God himself is both heaven and hell, reward and punishment. All men have been created to see God unceasingly in His uncreated glory. Whether God will be for each man heaven or hell, reward or punishment, depends on man's response to God's love and on man's transformation from the state of selfish and self-centered love, to Godlike love which does not seek its own ends.") Theories explicitly identifying Hell with an experience of the divine light may go back as far as Theophanes of Nicea. According to Iōannēs Polemēs, Theophanes believed that, for sinners, "the divine light will be perceived as the punishing fire of hell".

Other Eastern Orthodox theologians describe hell as separation from God. Archimandrite Sophrony (Sakharov) speaks of "the hell of separation from God". "The circumstances that rise before us, the problems we encounter, the relationships we form, the choices we make, all ultimately concern our eternal union with or separation from God." "Hell is nothing else but separation of man from God, his autonomy excluding him from the place where God is present." "Hell is a spiritual state of separation from God and inability to experience the love of God, while being conscious of the ultimate deprivation of it as punishment." "Hell is none other than the state of separation from God, a condition into which humanity was plunged for having preferred the creature to the Creator. It is the human creature, therefore, and not God, who engenders hell. Created free for the sake of love, man possesses the incredible power to reject this love, to say 'no' to God. By refusing communion with God, he becomes a predator, condemning himself to a spiritual death (hell) more dreadful than the physical death that derives from it."

According to Iōannēs Polemēs, the important Orthodox theologian Gregory Palamas did not believe that sinners would experience the divine light: "Unlike Theophanes, Palamas did not believe that sinners could have an experience of the divine light [...] Nowhere in his works does Palamas seem to adopt Theophanes' view that the light of Tabor is identical with the fire of hell."

=== Theosis ===
The practice of ascetic prayer called hesychasm in the Eastern Orthodox Church is centered on the enlightenment, deification (theosis) of man. (Note: "Hesychasm, then, which is centered on the enlightenment or deification (θέωσις, or theosis, in Greek) of man, perfectly encapsulates the soteriological principles and full scope of the spiritual life of the Eastern Church. As Bishop Auxentios of Photiki writes: "[W]e must understand the Hesychastic notions of 'theosis' and the vision of Uncreated Light, the vision of God, in the context of human salvation. Thus, according to St. Nicodemos the Hagiorite (†1809): 'Know that if your mind is not deified by the Holy Spirit, it is impossible for you to be saved.' Before looking in detail at what it was that St. Gregory Palamas' opponents found objectionable in his Hesychastic theology and practices, let us briefly examine the history of the Hesychastic Controversy proper.") Theosis has also been referred to as "glorification", (Note: "14. Orthodox Fathers of the Church are those who practice the specific Old and New Testament cure of this sickness of religion. Those who do not practice this cure, but on the contrary have introduced such practices as pagan mysticism, are not Fathers within this tradition. Orthodox Theology is not 'mystical', but 'secret' (mystike). The reason for this name 'Secret' is that the glory of God in the experience of glorification (theosis) has no similarity whatsoever with anything created. On the contrary the Augustinians imagine that they are being united with uncreated original ideas of God of which creatures are supposedly copies and which simply do not exist.") "union with God", "becoming god by Grace", "self-realization", "the acquisition of the Holy Spirit", "experience of the uncreated light" (Tabor light). (Note: "The three disciples of Christ (Peter, James and John) beheld the glory of Christ on Mount Tabor [...]. Theosis-Divinisation: It is the participation in the uncreated grace of God. Theosis is identified and connected with the theoria (vision) of the uncreated Light (see note above). It is called theosis in grace because it is attained through the energy of the divine grace. It is a co-operation of God with man, since God is He Who operates and man is he who co-operates.")

Theosis (Greek for "making divine", "deification", "to become gods by Grace", and for "divinization", "reconciliation, union with God" and "glorification") (Note: "2. The leadership of the Roman Empire had come to realize that religion is a sickness whose cure was the heart and core of the Christian tradition they had been persecuting. These astute Roman leaders changed their policy having realized that this cure should be accepted by as many Roman citizens as possible. Led by Constantine the Great, Roman leaders adopted this cure in exactly the same way that today's governments adopt modern medicine in order to protect their citizens from quack doctors. But in this case what was probably as important as the cure was the possibility of enriching society with citizens who were replacing the morbid quest for happiness with the selfless love of glorification (theosis) dedicated to the common good.") is expressed as "Being, union with God" and having a relationship or synergy between God and man. God is Heaven, God is the Kingdom of Heaven, the uncreated is that which is infinite and unending, glory to glory. Since this synergy or union is without fusion it is based on free will and not the irresistibly of the divine (i.e. the monophysite). Since God is transcendent (incomprehensible in ousia, essence or being), the West has overemphasized its point through logical arguments that God cannot be experienced in this life.

According to Romanides, following Vladimir Lossky in his interpretation of St. Gregory Palamas, the teaching that God is transcendent (incomprehensible in ousia, essence or being), has led in the West to the (mis)understanding that God cannot be experienced in this life. (Note: www.monachos.net: "At the heart of Barlaam's teaching is the idea that God cannot truly be perceived by man; that God the Transcendent can never be wholly known by man, who is created and finite.") Romanides states that Western theology is more dependent upon logic and reason, culminating in scholasticism used to validate truth and the existence of God, than upon establishing a relationship with God (theosis and theoria). (Note: "And, indeed, the Franks believed that the prophets and apostles did not see God himself, with possibly the exception of Moses and Paul. What the prophets and apostles allegedly did see and hear were phantasmic symbols of God, whose purpose was to pass on concepts about God to human reason. Whereas these symbols passed into and out of existence, the human nature of Christ is a permanent reality and the best conveyor of concepts about God.") (Note: Romanides ideas have been very influential in the contemporary Greek Orthodox Churches, and are supported by men like Metropolitan Hierotheos (Vlachos) of Nafpaktos, Thomas Hopko, Professor George D. Metallinos (Note: We have a culture that creates saints, holy people. Our people's ideal is not to create wisemen. Nor was this the ideal of ancient Hellenic culture and civilization. Hellenic anthropocentric (human-centered) Humanism is transformed into Theanthropism (God-humanism) and its ideal is now the creation of Saints, Holy people who have reached the state of theosis (deification).) Nikolaos Loudovikos, Dumitru Stăniloae, Stanley S. Harakas and Archimandrite George, Abbot of the Holy Monastery of St. Gregorios of Mount Athos.)

== Influence ==
According to Kalaitzidis, Romanides had a strong influence on contemporary Greek Orthodoxy, to such an extent that some speak about "pre- and post-Romanidian theology". Kalaitzidis further notes that Romanides' post-1975 theology has "furnished a convenient and comforting conspiratorial explanation for the historical woes of Orthodoxy and Romiosyne", but is "devoid of the slightest traces of self-criticism, since blame is always placed upon others". James L. Kelley's recent article has argued that Kalaitzidis's concern that Orthodox theologians engage in "self-criticism" is a ploy to engineer a "development of Orthodox doctrine" so that, once the Orthodox place some of the blame on themselves for "divisions of Christian groups", they will adjust the teachings of Orthodoxy to suit the ecumenist agenda.

== Works ==
=== Articles ===
Several of his articles can be found at the website dedicated to him. Among his books are:

=== Books ===
- Dogmatic and Symbolic Theology of the Orthodox Catholic Church (in Greek; Thessaloniki: Pournaras, 1973).
- Romiosini, Romania, Roumeli (in Greek; Thessaloniki: Pournaras, 1975).
- Romanides, John S. (1981). Franks, Romans, Feudalism, and Doctrine: An Interplay Between Theology and Society. Brookline, MA: Holy Cross Orthodox Press. ISBN 9780916586546.
  1. An Interplay Between Theology and Society.
  2. Empirical Theology versus Speculative Theology.
  3. The Filioque.
- Romanides, John S. (2002). The Ancestral Sin. Ridgewood, New Jersey: Zephyr Publishing. ISBN 9780970730312.
- Romanides, John S. (2004). An Outline of Orthodox Patristic Dogmatics. Rollinsford, New Hampshire: Orthodox Research Institute. ISBN 9780974561844.
- Romanides, John S. (2008). Patristic Theology. Thessaloniki: Uncut Mountain Press.
- Romanides, John S. (2009). The Life in Christ. Dewdney: Synaxis Press.
- Patristic Theology: The University Lectures of Fr. John Romanides (Uncut Mountain Press, 2022) ISBN 9781639410026

== See also ==
- Vladimir Lossky
- Michael Pomazansky
- George Metallinos
- George Dragas
- Metropolitan Hierotheos (Vlachos) of Nafpaktos

== Sources ==
- Kalaitzidis, Pantelis (2013), "The Image of the West in Contemporary Greek Theology", in Demacopoulos, George E.; Papanikolaou, Aristotle (eds.), Orthodox Constructions of the West, Oxford University Press
- Louth, Andrew (2015), Modern Orthodox Thinkers: From the Philokalia to the Present, InterVarsity Press
- Metropolitan Hierotheos Vlachos (2005), "The Knowledge of God according to St. Gregory Palamas", Orthodox Psychotherapy, Birth of Theotokos Monastery, Greece, ISBN 978-960-7070-27-2
