= George Metallinos =

Greek theologian

The Very Reverend George Metallinos
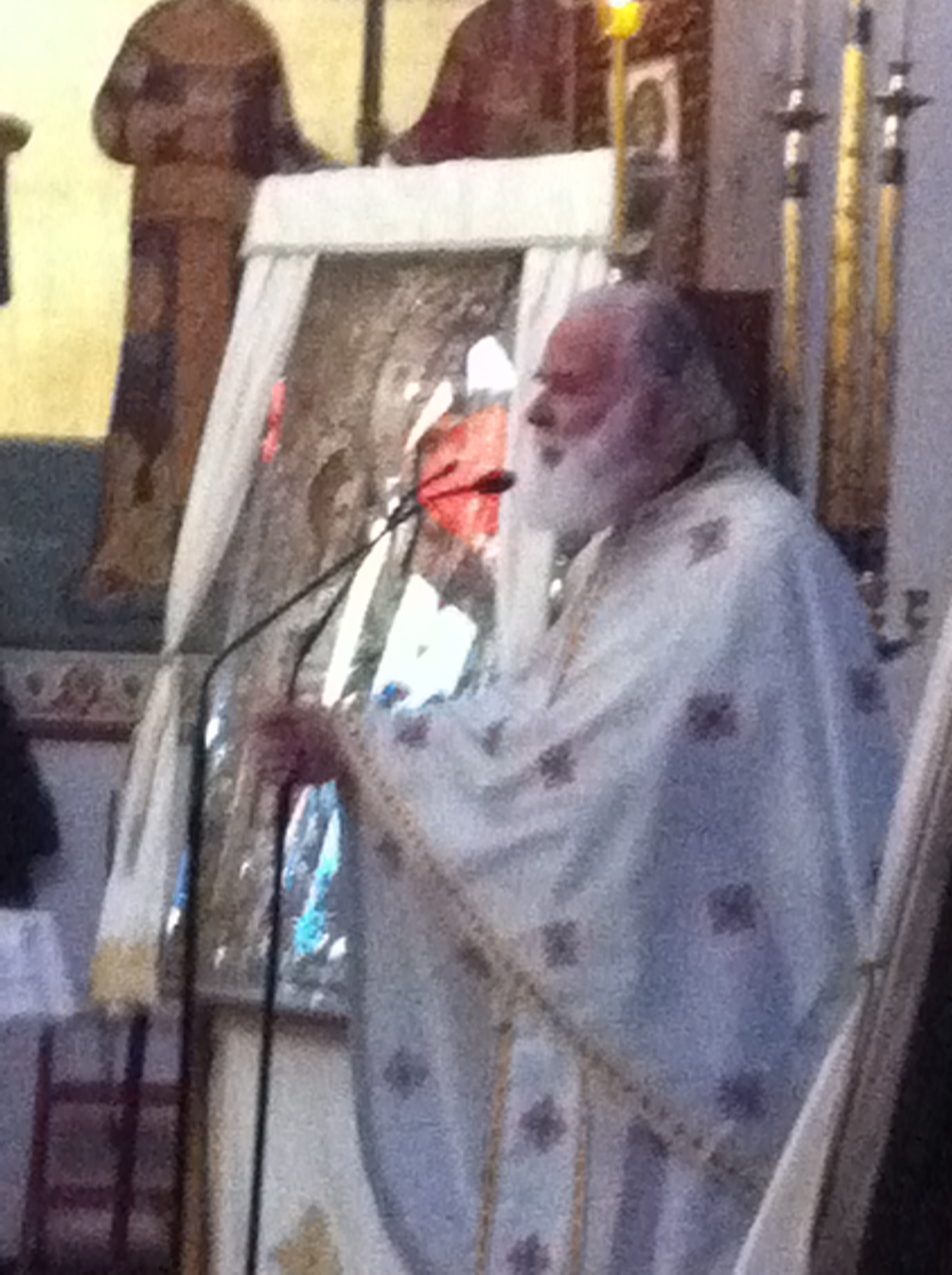
- George Metallinos in Kastoria
- Born: Georgios Metallinos; 11 March 1940; Corfu, Greece
- Died: 19 December 2019 (aged 79)
- Education: University of Athens

George Metallinos (Greek: Γεώργιος Μεταλληνός Georgios Metallinos; 11 March 1940 – 19 December 2019) was a Greek Orthodox theologian, priest (protopresbyter), historian, author and professor.

== Biography ==
He was born in Corfu, Greece on 11 March 1940, where he also completed his secondary education. He was a graduate of the University of Athens in theology (1962) and classical Literature (1967). After his military service (1963–1965) he became research assistant at the department of patrology and in 1969 he went to West Germany for postgraduate studies in Bonn and Cologne, where he resided until 1975. During this time he also conducted studies and archival research in England. In 1971, he was ordained a member of the clergy and became Doctor of Theology (University of Athens) and Doctor of Philosophy - History (University of Cologne).

In 1984 he became professor at the school of theology of the University of Athens, teaching History of Spirituality during the Post-Byzantine Period, History and Theology of Worship, and Byzantine History. He served as dean of the school of theology between 2004 and 2007, when he was emerited.

== Quotes ==
"The Resurrection of Christ is the most significant event to take place in History. It is the event that differentiates Christianity from every other religion. Other religions have mortal leaders, whereas the Head of the Church is the Resurrected Christ. “Resurrection of Christ” implies the deification and the resurrection of human nature, and the hope for deification and resurrection of our own hypostasis. Since the medicine has been discovered, there is hope for life.

Through Christ's Resurrection, both life and death take on a new meaning. “Life” now means communion with God; “Death” is no longer the end of this present lifetime, but the distancing of Man from Christ. The separation of the soul from the mortal body is no longer seen as “death”; it is only a temporary slumber."

From: The Resurrection of Christ is the Annihilation of Death

"Orthodoxy does not wish to be a religious community for charitable services, nor a human organization which strives only for peace on earth and coexistence among nations. Orthodoxy wishes to be, above all, Body of Christ, a salvation laboratory for healing human existence, which is basic prerequisite for man's formation at the limits of authentic communion with God and the world.

Moreover, there is no evolutionary process in Orthodoxy by the meaning of continuous change. Our course is Christ-centered with no changes. Christ remains the absolute center and reference point of Orthodox people in all times. He secures our unity throughout time, with His presence within ourselves. His uncreated action is uniting (in the horizontal, as well as vertical dimension) the faithful people throughout history and accomplishes their unity, not as subjection under fixed norms of living and acting, but as life resulting by His presence within themselves."

From: Orthodox Spirituality - Mutual Concession of Present and Future Life

== See also ==
- John Romanides
- Gnosiology
- Hierotheos (Vlachos)
- Nikolaos Loudovikos
- Vladimir Lossky
- Hesychasm
- Theoria
- Theosis (Eastern Orthodox theology)

== Sources ==
- Tribute to Fr. George Metallinos - Biographical Notes, Bibliography, and Collection of Articles (Website in Greek), retrieved on February 9, 2009
- About Theology. Personal Website of Pavlos Vatavalis (in Greek), retrieved on February 9, 2009
