= George Dragas =

Eastern Orthodox priest, theologian, and writer

The Reverend Father Protopresbyter George Dion Dragas (born 1944) is an Orthodox Christian priest, theologian, and writer. He is Professor Emeritus of Patristics at Holy Cross Greek Orthodox School of Theology in Brookline, Massachusetts.

== Life ==
Protopresbyter George Dion. Dragas, Ph.D., D.D. (Hon.), was born in Athens, Greece, where he received his first education and studied science. He studied theology at the University of Edinburgh (B.D.), Princeton Theological Seminary (M.Th.) and Durham University, England (Ph.D.).

He taught patristics at Durham University in England from 1974 to 1995; in 1995, he began teaching at Holy Cross in Brookline. He also worked as a visiting professor at Université de Sherbrooke in Quebec, Canada, and Visiting Professor of Eastern Orthodox Monasticism at Holy Trinity Orthodox Seminary in Jordanville, New York. He retired from Holy Cross in 2020.

He is a specialist on St. Athanasius and the Alexandrian theologians. He is responsible for updating with critical introductions the Athens reprint of Migne's Patrologia Graeca (about 80 volumes published so far). He is also the General Editor of the Patristic and Ecclesiastical Texts and Translations and the Orthodox Theological Library series published by the Orthodox Research Institute.

He is a member of the Academie Internationale des Science Religieuses (Brussels) and has been involved in Ecumenical Dialogues for many years as representative of the Ecumenical Patriarchate of Constantinople. In 2000, the Faculty of Theology of the St. Clement National University of Sofia, Bulgaria, conferred on him the degree of Doctor of Divinity (D.D.) honoris causa; in 2005, the Department of Pastoral and Social Theology of the Faculty of Theology of the Aristotle University of Thessaloniki conferred on him the degree of Doctor of Theology (D.Th.) honoris causa.

== Works ==
His publications include;

- Against Those Unwilling to Confess that the Holy Virgin Is Theotokos - Saint Cyril of Alexandria (2004) (editor and translator)
- An Outline of Orthodox Patristic Dogmatics (editor) (2004) (editor and translator) (written by John Romanides)
- On the Priesthood and the Holy Eucharist According to St. Symeon of Thessalonica, Patriarch Kallinikos of Constantinople and St. Mark Eugenikos of Ephesus (2004)
- St. Cyril of Alexandria's Teaching on the Priesthood (2004) ISBN 978-0-9745618-1-3
- Ecclesiasticus I: Introducing Eastern Orthodoxy (2004)
- Ecclesiasticus II: Orthodox Icons, Saints, Feasts and Prayer (2005)
- Greek Orthodox Patrology: An Introduction to the Study of the Church Fathers (2005) (editor and translator) (written by Panagiotes K. Chrestou)
- The Lord's Prayer according to Saint Makarios of Corinth (2005)
- Saint Athanasius of Alexandria: Original Research and New Perspectives (2005)
- Christian Philosophy in the Patristic and Byzantine Tradition (with Basil N. Tatakis) (2007) ISBN 978-1-933275-16-1
- Greek Orthodox Churches of New England (2010) ISBN 978-0-615-35470-5
