= Nikolaos Loudovikos =

Greek Orthodox theologian, priest and psychologist

The Very Reverend Nikolaos Loudovikos
- Born: 1959 (age 66–67); Volos, Greece
- Education: University of Athens; University of Thessaloniki; Paris IV; Catholic Institute of Paris; University of Cambridge

Nikolaos Loudovikos (Greek: Νικόλαος Λουδοβίκος; born 1959) is a Greek Orthodox theologian, philosopher, priest (protopresbyter), psychologist, author and Professor.

== Biography ==
Nikolaos Loudovikos was born in Volos, Greece, in 1959. He studied Psychology and Pedagogy at the University of Athens, Theology at the University of Thessaloniki, Philosophy and History of Religions at Sorbonne Paris IV, Philosophy and Roman Catholic Theology at the Catholic Institute of Paris, Philosophy and Protestant Theology at the University of Cambridge. He received a Ph.D. in 1989 from the Theological Faculty of Aristotle University of Thessaloniki. The title of his dissertation was: The Eucharistic Ontology in the Theological Thought of St. Maximus the Confessor.

He has worked as a researcher at the Tyndale House (Cambridge). He has taught and lectured at the Centre for Advanced Religious and Theological Studies (CARTS) of the Department of Theology at the University of Cambridge, at Durham University, as well as atsome 30 other Universities and Research Centres globally. Between 1994-2022 he was a Professor of Dogmatics and Philosophy at the University Ecclesiastical Academy of Thessaloniki. In 1999 he was appointed a Lecturer in Systematic Theology at the Institute for Orthodox Christian Studies and, since 2007, he is a Visiting Professor at the Institute. During 2006-2008 he was a Visiting Professor at the University of Wales, and during 2009-2020 he was a Teaching Research Fellow at the University of Winchester. Since 2018, he is a Visiting Professor at the Thological Faculty of the University Balamand (Lebanon). Since 2023, he is Professor of Religious Studies and Hermeneutics of Religion at the School of Education of the University of Ioannina. He is Senior Editor of Analogia Journal - The Pemptousia Journal of Theological Studies, a peer-reviewed academic journal dedicated to the scholarly exposition and discussion of the theological principles of the Christian faith.

Loudovikos is a member of the Saint Irenaeus Joint Orthodox-Catholic Working Group, where he has served as co-secretary (Orthodox) between the years 2004 and 2018.

== Thought ==
Loudovikos is considered to be an exceptionally creative thinker. He has created a series of new concepts of theological provenance, in dialogue with Philosophy, Psychology, political thought, inter-religious thought, and spirituality. In this way, he intends both an intervention to modern interdisciplinary thought, and at the same time, a modern reassessment of Christian anthropology, and cosmology. Loudovikos speaks clearly about a Christian Greek-Western world, which is to be rediscovered beyond sterile cultural separations of the past, and in view of a deeper communication and complementarity. We can group the main concepts into the following categories:

- a. Theology

Loudovikos has coined the terms 'Eucharistic Ontology', and 'Dialogical Reciprocity' in his interpretation of Maximus the Confessor, in his book A Eucharistic Ontology: Maximus the Confessor's Eschatological Ontology of Being as Dialogical Reciprocity, Translated by Elizabeth Theokritoff, revised and extended. Holy Cross Orthodox Press, Brookline, Mass, 2010. By the former term, he ventures to show that by speaking of Eucharist we do not refer just to a Sacrament, but to the prefiguration of an eschatological ontology, that is, the mode of existence God wills things to exist, which mode of existence starts from this age. By the latter term, he wants to show the active and not just passive way of human participation in the Ecclesial event. Another crucial term coined by Loudovikos is the term 'Ecclesiology of Consubstantiality' in his book Church in the Making: An Apophatic Ecclesiology of Consubstantiality, Translated by Norman Russell, revised and extended. St. Vladimir's Seminary Press, Crestwood, NY, 2016. With this term, which is extracted from Denys the Areopagite and Maximus the Confessor, he tries to describe the core of the Ecclesial being, as a Christological transferring of the Trinitarian Homoousion in Creation. Loudovikos has criticised sharply Yannaras's and Zizioulas's Orthodox personalism, concerning the latter's understanding of person in a dialectic antithesis with nature, both in man and God, where nature is supposed to be identified with necessity, while person is identified with freedom. He proposes the concept of personal or hypostatic nature in order to show that freedom has precisely to do equally with nature, which is a gift of God's loving will, rather than a burden of necessity. See his Analogical Identities: The Creation of the Christian Self: Beyond Spirituality and Mysticism in the Patristic Era (Studia Traditionis Theologiae) (English, Ancient Greek and Latin Edition), Brepols Publishers; Multilingual Edition, Belgium, 2019. In this book, he also proposes the term 'will-to-Consubstantiality' in order to explain the mode of the function of human will, according to nature.

- b. Philosophy

Loudovikos has proposed the term 'Existential Correlation', in order to explain the way Ancient Greek Philosophy came to dialogue with Early Christian thought. See his Unseen Harmony: A Metaphysical History of Ancient Greek Philosophy, Armos, Athens, 2021. By this he means a new way of an existential association of Ancient Philosophy with Christian Theology, which goes beyond the History of terms. In other works, he has proposed terms such as: 'Intermeaningfulness', by putting in dialogue Wittgenstein with Gregory Palamas and Thomas Aquinas; 'Inter-hypostatic Syn-energy', by putting in dialogue Gregory Palamas with modern personalism; 'Self-catholicization', by putting in dialogue the Evagrian tradition with modern transcendental subjectivism, in his Analogical Identities: The Creation of the Christian Self. Vol. 2: Intermeaningfulness: Self-catholicization, Meta-narcissism and Christian Theology (Studia Traditionis Theologiae) (English, Ancient Greek and Latin Edition), Brepols Publishers; Multilingual Edition, Belgium, 2024. His overall proposal is the concept of 'Analogical Identity', in the two volumes that bear this title, in order to show a new understanding of Analogy, never tried before, and coming mainly from the Greek Patristic Tradition, while some Western Theological trends seem also to be very close: it is the 'Analogy of Energy/Syn-ergy/Dialogue'. Another concept proposed, is the term 'Inter-linguality', in his book Church in the Making, above, where Wittgenstein is put in dialogue with Maximus the Confessor's ecclesiological understanding of language.

- c. Political Philosophy

Loudovikos has proposed the concept of 'Balanced or Dialogical Modernization' in order to explain how the Byzantine understanding of individuality, state, and history, can be put in dialogue with modern Western political Philosophy, in his book Orthodoxy and Modernization - Byzantine Individualization, State and History in the Perspective of the European Future, Armos, Athens, 2006. In his book The Open History and its Enemies: The Rise of the Velvet Totalitarianism, Armos, Athens, 2020, he speaks of the concept of 'Open History', that is the concept of History which is open to metaphysical justification, against the modern self-justification of History in terms of power. He also speaks of the coming 'Third or Velvet Totalitarianism', which highlights a new and most dangerous form of totalitarianism that seems to be coming slowly.

- d. Psychology

Loudovikos has proposed to psychologists a series of concepts of theological provenance that can help modern Psychology understand better today's psyche. These terms are mainly proposed in his Analogical Identities: The Creation of the Christian Self. Vol. 2: Intermeaningfulness: Self-catholicization, Meta-narcissism and Christian Theology (Studia Traditionis Theologiae) (English, Ancient Greek and Latin Edition), Brepols Publishers; Multilingual Edition, Belgium, 2024. These terms are: 'Meta-narcissism', which, for Loudovikos, signifies the modern state of narcissism; 'Inter-intra-co-being', that is the way modern subjectivity can combine selfhood, interiority, and communion; 'Consubstantial Selves', that is a modern understanding of selfhood that can be derived from the Denys the Areopagite in dialogue with Heinz Kohut, Karl Rogers, Irvin Yallom and Jean-Luc Marion; this understanding of selfhood is formed through the formula 'so much distribution - that much participation', which can be traced in the Areopagitic work. Recently, Loudovikos worked upon the 'Neurobiology of the Unconscious', in dialogue with modern Neuropsychology.

- e. Inter-Religious Dialogue

In his book Technopithecus and Truth: Hermeneutics of Religion in the Times of Artificial Intelligence, Armos, Athens, 2024, Loudovikos initiates a dialogue between Muslim Mystical Theology and Orthodox Hesychasm, Baghavat Ghita and Philokalia, the Buddhist concept of person and Christian Personalism, and Taoism and the Christian concept of ascesis.

- f. Spirituality

In his book A History of God's Love, The Holy Monastery of Vatopedi, Holy Mountain, 2015, Loudovikos tries to show how the Christian 'life in Christ' goes far beyond what has been called 'spirituality' in the history of Religions and Philosophies, towards a new ontology of participation.

== Bibliography ==
Loudovikos has authored the following books in Greek (titles translated):

- Eucharistic Ontology, Domos, Athens, 1992, ISBN 960-7217-72-1
- Closed Spirituality and the Meaning of Self, Ellinika Grammata, Athens, 1999, ISBN 960-344-663-7
- The Apophatic Ecclesiology of Consubstantiality: The Ancient Church Today, Armos, Athens 2002, ISBN 960-527-249-0
- Theopoiia - The Postmodern Theological Quest, Armos, Athens, 2007, ISBN 960-527-427-2
- Psychoanalysis and Orthodox Theology - About Desire, Catholicity and Eschatology, Armos, Athens, 2006, ISBN 960-527-283-0
- Orthodoxy and Modernization - Byzantine Individualization, State and History in the Perspective of the European Future, Armos, Athens, 2006, 960-527-337-3
- Theological History of Ancient Hellenic Philosophy - Presocratics, Socrates, Plato, Pournaras Publishing, Athens, 2003, ISBN 960-242-296-3
- Interpretation in Psychiatry and Psychotherapy, Stanghellini Giovanni, Vasilakos Georgios, Gemenetzis Kostas, Didaskalou Thanos, Loudovikos Nikolaos, Begzos Marios P., Papageorgiou Thanos, Pentzopoulou-Valala Teresa, Chartokollis Petris, Ypsilon Publishing, 2005, ISBN 960-17-0174-5
- The Terrors of the Person and the Ordeals of Love: Critical Thoughts for a Postmodern Theological Ontology, Armos, Athens, 2009
- Striving for Participation: Being and Methexis in Gregory Palamas and Thomas Aquinas, Armos, Athens, 2010
- A History of God's Love, The Holy Monastery of Vatopedi, Holy Mountain, 2015
- Theological Discources, Vol I, Homophor, Sofia, 2015 (in Bulgarian)
- Theological Discources, Vol II, Homophor, Sofia, 2016 (in Bulgarian)
- The Open History and its Enemies: The Rise of the Velvet Totalitarianism, Armos, Athens, 2020
- Unseen Harmony: A Metaphysical History of Ancient Greek Philosophy, Armos, Athens, 2021
- Technopithecus and Truth: Hermeneutics of Religion in the Times of Artificial Intelligence, Armos, Athens, 2024
- Let us Think Again Humanism, Enallaktikes Ekdoseis, Athens, 2024
- Maximus the Confessor, The 400 Chapters on Love. Introduction to the Theology of St Maximus the Confessor, and Theological Comments, Holy Monastery of Vatopaidi, Holy Mountain, 2024

Loudovikos has published the following books in English:

- A Eucharistic Ontology: Maximus the Confessor's Eschatological Ontology of Being as Dialogical Reciprocity, Translated by Elizabeth Theokritoff, revised and extended. Holy Cross Orthodox Press, Brookline, Mass, 2010, ISBN 978-1-935317-08-1
- Church in the Making: An Apophatic Ecclesiology of Consubstantiality, Translated by Norman Russell, revised and extended. St. Vladimir's Seminary Press, Crestwood, NY, 2016, ISBN 978-0-88141-509-4
- Analogical Identities: The Creation of the Christian Self: Beyond Spirituality and Mysticism in the Patristic Era (Studia Traditionis Theologiae) (English, Ancient Greek and Latin Edition), Brepols Publishers; Multilingual Edition, Belgium, 2019, ISBN 978-2-503-57815-6
- Analogical Identities: The Creation of the Christian Self. Vol. 2: Intermeaningfulness: Self-catholicization, Meta-narcissism and Christian Theology (Studia Traditionis Theologiae) (English, Ancient Greek and Latin Edition), Brepols Publishers; Multilingual Edition, Belgium, 2024, ISBN 978-2-503-60991-1

== See also ==
- George Metallinos
- Hierotheos (Vlachos)
