= Hierotheos Vlachos =

Greek Orthodox Metropolitan and Theologian

His Eminence Hierotheos Vlachos
- Metropolitan of Nafpaktos and Agios Vlasios
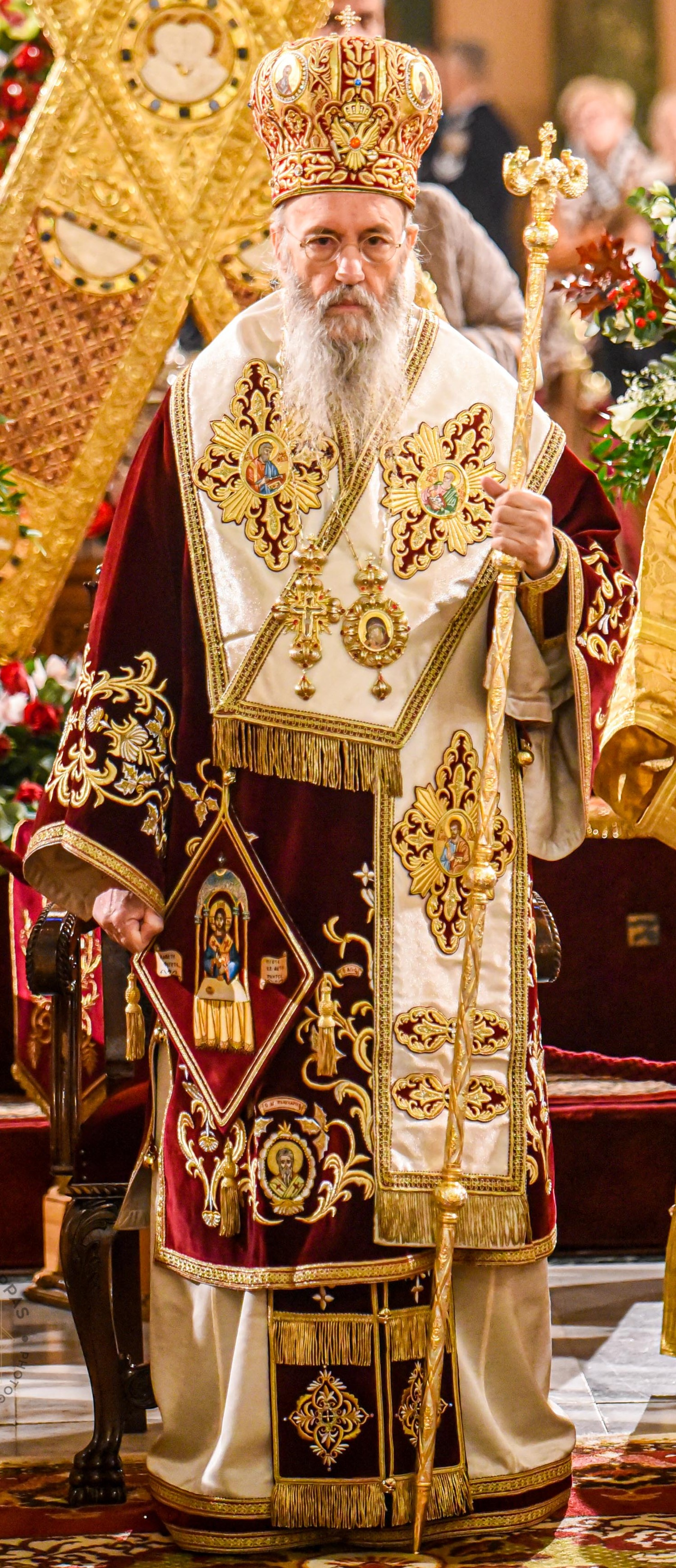
- Metropolitan Hierotheos in 2022
- Church: Orthodox Church of Greece
- Metropolis: Nafpaktos and Agios Vlasios
- Elected: 1995-07-19

Personal details
- Born: Georgios Vlachos; 1945 (age 80–81) Ioannina, Greece
- Education: University of Thessaloniki

Hierotheos Vlachos (Greek: Ιερόθεος Βλάχος; born Georgios Vlachos, Greek: Γεώργιος Βλάχος, Ioannina, 27 March 1945) is a Greek Orthodox theologian, author and hierarch of the Church of Greece, serving as the Metropolitan of Nafpaktos and Agios Vlasios since 1995. and .

== Biography ==
Georgios Vlachos was born in 1945 in Ioannina. In 1968, he earned his degree from the Faculty of Theology of the Aristotle University of Thessaloniki (AUTH) with highest honors ("Excellent").

He was ordained deacon in 1971 and presbyter in 1972 by Saint Kallinikos, Metropolitan of Edessa, Pella, and Almopia. He served as a preacher (a celibate clergyman [usually one in each diocese] appointed by the Holy Synod of the Church of Greece, whose mission is to tour the various parishes of the diocese to which he belongs, to preach, and to hear confessions): from 1969 to 1986 in the Metropolis of Edessa, Pella, and Almopia; from 1986 to 1987 in the Metropolis of Thebes and Levadeia; and from 1987 to 1995 in the Archdiocese of Athens, where he also served as director of its Youth Office. During the periods 1988–1990 and 2000–2001, he served as a professor at the Balamand Theological School "Saint John of Damascus" of the Patriarchate of Antioch. He has taught as a visiting professor at Holy Cross Greek Orthodox School of Theology in Boston, in Tacoma, Washington, and at Pacific Lutheran University in Tacoma, USA. Since 2016, he has been teaching at the Antiochian House of Studies (AHOS) in California, USA, a doctoral program accredited by US authorities.

On 19 July 1995, he was elected Metropolitan of Nafpaktos and Agios Vlasios by the Hierarchy of the Church of Greece and was ordained bishop the following day. He has visited numerous Patriarchates and foreign Churches, receiving many honors. In 2016, he was a member of the delegation of the Church of Greece at the Holy and Great Council of Crete. He has served as locum tenens (caretaker bishop) for the Metropolises of Karpenision, Phokis, and Aitolia and Akarnania. He has also repeatedly served as the spokesperson for the Permanent Holy Synod and the Hierarchy of the Church of Greece.

On 25 September 2008, the Department of Social Theology at the School of Theology of the National and Kapodistrian University of Athens awarded him an honorary doctorate in recognition of his contribution to theological letters. In 2016, he was named an honorary doctor of the Department of Medicine at the University of Ioannina. On 5 May 2026, he was awarded an honorary doctorate by the Department of Social Theology and Christian Culture of the School of Theology at the Aristotle University of Thessaloniki. During the award ceremony, emphasis was placed on his contribution to modern Orthodox theology, his extensive written output, his international impact, and the connection of theological teaching with pastoral practice in his work.

He served as the sole representative of the Church of Greece to the media regarding the COVID-19 pandemic and in December 2020 he became its first hierarch to be vaccinated against the disease.

== Bibliography in English ==
Metropolitan Hierotheos Vlachos has produced an extensive body of written work. He has authored 137 books in Greek (with 218 translations into 28 foreign languages), making him the fourth most translated modern Greek author.

His book The Person in the Orthodox Tradition was awarded the first prize for the "top theological work written in Greece in 1991–96" by the Academy of Athens.

- (2025) The Orthodox Church and the Rest of the Christian World: The 'Holy and Great Council' in Crete 2016. Levadia: Birth of the Theotokos Monastery Press. ISBN 978-960-7070-66-1
- (2024) Post-Patristic Theology from the Orthodox Point of View. Levadia: Birth of the Theotokos Monastery Press. ISBN 978-960-7070-66-1
- (2024) God's Gifts. Levadia: Birth of the Theotokos Monastery Press. ISBN 978-960-7070-66-1
- (2023) Patristic and Scholastic Theology in Perspective, based in the Spoken Teaching of Father John Romanides. Levadia: Birth of the Theotokos Monastery Press. ISBN 978-960-7070-66-1
- (2021) St Kallinikos Metropolitan of Edessa, Pella and Almopia. Levadia: Birth of the Theotokos Monastery Press. ISBN 978-960-7070-66-1
- (2020) Time to Act. Levadia: Birth of the Theotokos Monastery Press. ISBN 978-960-7070-66-1
- (2018) The Feasts of the Mother of God. Levadia: Birth of the Theotokos Monastery Press
- (2017) The Orthodox Church in the World. Levadia: Birth of the Theotokos Monastery Press. ISBN 978-960-7070-66-1
- Vlachos, Hierotheos (2015). I Know a Man in Christ: Elder Sophrony the Hesychast and Theologian. Holy Monastery of the Birth of the Theotokos. ISBN 978-960-7070-89-0.
- (2013) The Seer: The Life of the Prophet Samuel and its Relevance Today. Levadia: Birth of the Theotokos Monastery Press. ISBN 978-960-7070-83-8
- (2013) Empirical Dogmatics of the Orthodox Catholic Church, according to the Spoken Teaching of Father John Romanides, Volume 2, Dogma - Ethics - Revelation. Levadia: Birth of the Theotokos Monastery Press. ISBN 978-960-7070-81-4
- (2012) Empirical Dogmatics of the Orthodox Catholic Church, according to the Spoken Teaching of Father John Romanides, Volume 1, Holy Trinity-Creation- Fall-Incarnation. Levadia: Birth of the Theotokos Monastery Press. ISBN 978-960-7070-75-3
- (2011) Orthodox Monasticism. Levadia: Birth of the Theotokos Monastery Press. ISBN 978-960-7070-73-9
- (2010) The Science of Spiritual Medicine. Levadia: Birth of the Theotokos Monastery Press. ISBN 978-960-7070-66-1
- Vlachos, Hierotheos (2007). Hesychia and Theology: The Context for Man's Healing in the Orthodox Church. Levadia, Greece: Birth of the Theotokοs Monastery. ISBN 978-960-7070-60-9.
- (2004) Entering the Orthodox Church. Levadia: Birth of the Theotokos Monastery Press. ISBN 978-618-5269-52-4
- (2001) Bioethics and Biotheology: Lectures to the students of the Theological School "Saint John of Damascus" of the Patriarchate of Antioch: Nafpaktos
- (2002) The Feasts fo the Lord. Levadia: Birth of the Theotokos Monastery Press. ISBN 978-960-7070-47-0
- (1999) A Visual Catehism of the Orthodox Church. Levadia: Birth of the Theotokos Monastery Press. ISBN 978-960-7070-42-5
- Vlachos, Hierotheos (1999). The Person in the Orthodox Tradition. Levadeia, Greece: Birth of the Theotokos Monastery. ISBN 960-7070-40-2.
- (1998) The Mind of the Orthodox Church. Levadia: Birth of the Theotokos Monastery Press. ISBN 978-618-5269-05-0
- (1997) St. Gregory Palamas as a Hagiorite: Levadia: Birth of the Theotokos Monastery Press. ISBN 978-960-7070-37-1
- Vlachos, Hierotheos (1996). Life After Death. Levadia, Greece: Birth of the Theotokos Monastery. ISBN 960-7070-34-8.
- Vlachos, Hierotheos (1994). Orthodox Spirituality: A Brief Introduction. Levadia, Greece: Birth of the Theotokos Monastery. ISBN 960-7070-20-8.
- Vlachos, Hierotheos (1994). Orthodox Psychotherapy: The Science of the Fathers. Levadia Levadhia, Greece: Birth of the Theotokos Monastery. ISBN 978-960-7070-27-2.
- (1994) Orthodox Spiritulality. Levadia: Birth of the Theotokos Monastery Press. ISBN 978-960-7070-20-3
- Orthodox Ethics. Levadia: Birth of the Theotokos Monastery Press
- Vlachos, Hierotheos (1993). The Illness and Cure of the Soul in the Orthodox Tradition. Levadia: Birth of the Theotokos Monastery Press. ISBN 978-960-7070-18-0.
- (1991) A Night in the Desert of the Holy Mountain, Levadia: Birth of the Theotokos Monastery Press. ISBN 978-960-7070-31-4
