= John Kyparissiotes =

Byzantine theologian (1310-c.1379)

John Kyparissiotes or Cyparissiotes (Greek: Ἰωάννης Κυπαρισσιώτης; c. 1310 - 1378/79), called “the Wise” by his contemporaries, was a Byzantine theologian and the leading Anti-Palamite writer in the period that followed the deaths of Nikephoros Gregoras (c. 1360) and of Palamas himself (14 September 1359). Of all the fourteenth-century opponents of Gregory Palamas, he was the most systematic theologian, and perhaps the ablest. Most of his works remain in original manuscripts, unedited; none has ever appeared in translation in a modern language. Although editions of some of his works have been made since the 1950s, most of them, published in small printings in Greece, are nearly as difficult to come by in the West as the original manuscripts themselves.

== Life ==
Few facts about Kyparissiotes’ life are known. The Kyparissiotes family name appears in Byzantine records occasionally from the tenth century onwards. It points to a family origin in Kyparissia, a town on the southwest coast of the Peloponnesus; whether John Kyparissiotes was born there, however, or at Constantinople, or at some other location, remains uncertain. The level of sophistication of his writings suggests that, wherever he was born, he was educated in the Byzantine capital. By 1342 at the latest he had sided with the opponents of Palamas in the religious controversy over Hesychasm that was then dividing Byzantine society and exacerbating a civil war. He may have belonged to the circle of scholars who frequented the house of Nikephoros Gregoras; he speaks of him with great respect, and is our sole source for the information that, after Gregoras's death, the Palamites dragged his dead body through the streets. Other acquaintances included Demetrios Kydones, the prime minister to John VI Kantakouzenos and John V Palaiologos and translator of Aquinas.

In the renewed persecution of Antipalamites that followed the condemnation of Demetrios Kydones’ brother, the monk Prochoros, in 1368, Kyparissiotes found it necessary to flee the country. In 1371 he was living in Cyprus, as is testified by a letter from Demetrios Kydones (ep. 35). From there, he headed further west; records indicate that he travelled with the court of Pope Gregory XI during the latter's journey from Avignon to Rome (9 November 1376 - 12 December 1377), and received from him a monthly pension. By then, he must have become a Roman Catholic. It is possible, though not certain, that Kyparissiotes is the “good John” of whom Kydones, in another letter (ep. 130), speaks as having returned to Constantinople (1378/79). If so, that would be the last piece of information we have about him.

== Writings ==
We possess from Kyparissiotes’ pen two major writings, and a number of minor ones. His two most important works are the Decades, on the one hand, and Against the Heresy of the Palamites, on the other. The latter work is a gigantic polemical treatise in five parts, most of which still remains unedited. Of its first part, titled On the Crimes of the Palamites, books 1 and 4 have been published (Migne, PG 152, 664–737, which reprints the 1672 edition of Combefis). Part five of the larger work is a detailed refutation of the Concise Treatise of Nilos Kabasilas, and consists of five books. Kyparissiotes' point in this work, as elsewhere, is to defend divine simplicity; he argues that there is no middle term between the uncreated and the created, and that whatever is uncreated must be really identical with the one divine nature. The text of this work was edited by Dr. Stavros Maragoudaki and published in Athens in 1985.

As for the Decades — or, to give it its proper title, the Elementary Exposition of Theological Texts (Τῶν θεολογικῶν ῥήσεων στοιχειώδης ἔκθεσις) — it is a less overtly polemical work, although it too is ultimately concerned with refuting the Palamite theology. It is organized into ten parts, each part being further divided into ten chapters (hence the alternative title). Albert Ehrhard characterized this work as “the first [Byzantine] attempt at a systematic Dogmatics in the manner of Western scholasticism.” He goes on to speak of it in the following way:

“Like the Scholastics, John begins with a setting forth of axioms, definitions, and classifications of theology (in the sense of the Doctrine of God). He distinguishes between a mystical and a demonstrative theology; demonstrative theology is further divided into affirmative and negative. Affirmative theology deals with the divine emanations and names, negative theology with God’s infinity, both in creatures and in himself, and, finally, with divine simplicity. By means of further subdivisions, John obtains ten Decades, each of them containing further chapters. The imitation of the Scholastics is, nevertheless, limited to these resemblances; in terms of its content, this Byzantine Summa de Deo consists purely of passages from the fathers, organized under the specific points under consideration. The chief authority is Dionysius the Pseudo-Areopagite; after him, Athanasius, the three Cappadocians, Chrysostom, Cyril of Alexandria, and John of Damascus reappear most frequently.”

Migne reprints the Latin translation of this work, made by Francisco Torres in the late sixteenth century (PG 152, 741–992). More recently, an edition of the Greek text is reported to have appeared, although so far it is not to be found in most Western libraries.

Other works by John Kyparissiotes include nine Hymns addressed to the Word of God and a short work on the question whether the personal properties in the Trinity really differ from the divine essence. (Kyparissiotes’ answer is No.)
