= Divine simplicity =

View of God without parts or features

In classical theism, the doctrine of divine simplicity (also known as absolute divine simplicity) states that God is simple in that he is a single, unified entity with no distinction between his attributes. His essence is identical with his existence; that is to say, his essence is simply to exist, which makes Him fundamentally distinct from all other entities.

== Overview ==
The entity of God is taken to be identical to his attributes, eliminating any distinctions between them. Characteristics such as omnipresence, goodness, truth and eternity are identical to God's being, rather than attributes that make up that entity as a collection of abstract entities inherent to God as in a creature; in God, essence and existence are not distinguished.

Simplicity denies any physical or metaphysical composition in the divine being. God is the divine nature itself, with no accidents (things that inhere) accruing to his nature. There are no real divisions or distinctions of this nature; the entirety of God is whatever is attributed to him. For example, God does not have goodness, but is goodness; God does not have existence, but is existence. Divine simplicity is the hallmark of God's transcendence of all else, ensuring that the divine nature is beyond the reach of ordinary categories and distinctions (or, at least, their ordinary application). "Simplicity in this way confers a unique ontological status that many philosophers find highly peculiar." When it comes to God's essential nature or attributes, there are no parts or accidents; this is not to be confused with God's accidental or contingent relation to the world (God's non-essential or contingent properties, not God's nature).

Varieties of this doctrine exist among Jewish, Christian, and Muslim philosophical theologians, especially during the height of scholasticism. Its origins may be traced back to ancient Greek thought, finding apotheosis in Plotinus' Enneads as the Monad.

== History ==
Views similar to divine simplicity were held by philosophers such as Plato, Thales and Anaximenes. Classical statements about divine simplicity can be found in Augustine, Anselm and Thomas Aquinas. In early Christianity, Philo of Alexandria said that the belief of God as utterly simple was widely held. One of the earliest mentions of divine simplicity in Christian theology is by Irenaeus (130 – c. 202 AD). Early Christian theology viewed simplicity as necessary for preserving God's transcendence; Athenagoras of Athens, in the second century, said that God is indivisible and unchangeable. Clement of Alexandria, Basil, and Cyril saw simplicity as preserving the transcendence and perfection of God.

== Jewish thought ==
Maimonides, in The Guide for the Perplexed, said:

If, however, you have a desire to rise to a higher state, viz., that of reflection, and truly to hold the conviction that God is One and possesses true unity, without admitting plurality or divisibility in any sense whatever, you must understand that God has no essential attribute in any form or in any sense whatever, and that the rejection of corporeality implies the rejection of essential attributes. Those who believe that God is One, and that He has many attributes, declare the unity with their lips, and assume plurality in their thoughts.

According to Maimonides, there can be no plurality of faculties, moral dispositions, or essential attributes in God. To say that God is all-knowing, all-powerful, and all-good is to introduce plurality, if these qualities are separate attributes. Maimonides concluded that it is untrue to say that God's power is greater than ours, that God's life is more permanent than ours, or God's knowledge is broader than ours. He believed that statements such as "God lives" or "God is powerful" are nonsense if they are interpreted normally, but they can be understood if analyzed as disguised negations. Maimonides also believed that negation is objectionable to the degree that it introduces complexity; God is neither this nor that, and verbal expression fails us. Citing Psalm 65, he concluded that the highest form of praise of God is silence.

For others, the axiom of divine unity (Shema) forms the understanding of divine simplicity. Bahya ibn Paquda (Duties of the Heart 1:8) points out that God's oneness is "true oneness" (האחד האמת), as opposed to "circumstantial oneness" (האחד המקרי). He develops this idea to show that an entity that is truly one must be free of properties, indescribable, and unlike anything else. Such an entity would not be subject to change, utterly independent, and the root of everything.

The implication of either approach is so strong that the two concepts are often presented as synonymous: "God is not two or more entities, but a single entity of oneness even more single and unique than any single thing in creation ... He cannot be sub-divided into different parts – therefore, He can't be anything other than one. It is a positive commandment to know this, for it is written (Deuteronomy 6:4) ' ... the Lord is our God, the Lord is one.'"

Despite its apparent simplicity, this concept raises a number of difficulties. Since God's simplicity does not allow for any structure – even conceptually – divine simplicity appears to entail the following dichotomy:

- God is absolutely simple, containing no element of form or structure.
- God's essence contains every possible element of perfection.

This paradox is articulated by Moshe Chaim Luzzatto in Derech Hashem, who describes the dichotomy as arising from the inability to comprehend absolute unity:

God’s existence is absolutely simple, without combinations or additions of any kind. All perfections are found in Him in a perfectly simple manner. However, God does not entail separate domains – even though in truth there exist in God qualities which, within us, are separate ... Indeed the true nature of His essence is that it is a single attribute, (yet) one that intrinsically encompasses everything that could be considered perfection. All perfection therefore exists in God, not as something added on to His existence, but as an integral part of His intrinsic identity ... This is a concept that is very far from our ability to grasp and imagine ...

== Christian thought ==
Simplicity (or metaphysical, absolute simplicity) states that the characteristics of God are not parts of God which make up God. God is simple; God is those characteristics. God does not have goodness, but is goodness; God does not have existence, but is existence. According to Thomas Aquinas, God is God's existence and God's essence is God's existence. God is goodness, which is his nature, which is his essence, which is his existence. William F. Vallicella says, "To say that God lacks metaphysical parts is to say inter alia that God is free of matter-form composition, potency-act composition, and existence-essence composition. There is also no real distinction between God as a subject of his attributes and his attributes." God exhausts what it means to be God and, in principle, there cannot be more than one God. Divine simplicity is fundamentally about God's attributes: his nature or essence. The doctrine does not state that God cannot have the "property" of creating a universe.

John Duns Scotus has a more moderate view of metaphysical simplicity than Aquinas. According to Duns Scotus, there is a formal distinction between God's attributes. This distinction is not conceptual or metaphysical. The formal distinction is logical; omnipotence is not logically equivalent to omniscience. Duns Scotus affirms that God's nature is not composed of metaphysical properties or parts.

Yann Schmitt says,

As I already said, for a better understanding of the compatibility between divine simplicity and the distinction of attributes in God, I propose to use the notion of formal distinction developed by Duns Scotus.
FD X is formally distinct from Y if and only if (1) X and Y are inseparable even for an omnipotent being, (2) X and Y have not the same definition, (3) the distinction exists de re.

The notion of de re is contrasted with de dicto. De dicto concerns a proposition about what is said, and de re concerns the thing (or being). A formal distinction exists between the attribute of omnipotence and the attribute of omniscience because omnipotence and omniscience are inseparable for an omnipotent being (God); omnipotence and omniscience do not have the same definition, and the distinction between them exists de re (not conceptually or propositionally – de dicto). A formal distinction is a logical distinction. The upshot for Scotus is that omnipotence and omniscience are logically distinct for God, who does not have the metaphysical properties (or attributes) of omnipotence or omniscience; metaphysically speaking, God is omnipotence and is omniscient.

Spatial simplicity is endorsed by most traditional Christian theists, who do not consider God a physical object. Temporal simplicity is endorsed by many theists, but is controversial among Christian theologians. Thomas V. Morris controversially describes property simplicity as the property of having no properties.

In the medieval era, theologians and philosophers held a view known as "constituent ontology" wherein natures were constituents of things. According to Aquinas, an individual nature was more like a concrete object than an abstract object. One person's humanity was not the same as another person's humanity; each had human nature, individuated by the matter (materia signata) from which each person was composed. For entities which are immaterial (such as angels), there is no matter to individuate their nature; each one is its nature. Each angel is one of a kind, although this claim was controversial.

Theologians holding the doctrine of property simplicity distinguish modes of divine simplicity by negating any notion of composition from the meaning of terms used to describe it. In quantitative or spatial terms, God is simple – as opposed to being made up of pieces – and present in entirety everywhere if, in fact, present anywhere. In terms of essence, God is simple as opposed to being made up of form and matter, body and soul, or mind and act. If distinctions are made between God's attributes, they are distinctions of the "modes" of God's being rather than real or essential divisions. In terms of subjects and accidents (as in the phrase "goodness of God"), divine simplicity allows for a conceptual distinction between the person of God and the personal attribute of goodness but disallows that God's identity (or "character") is dependent on goodness. According to the doctrine, it is impossible to consider the goodness in which God participates separately from the goodness which God is.

Aquinas says that as creatures, our concepts are drawn from the creation (the assumption of empiricism); according to divine simplicity, God's attributes can only be spoken of by analogy since the properties of any created thing differ from its being. Divine simplicity was affirmed at the Fourth Lateran Council and First Vatican Council and is accepted in some form by most Christians.

The simplicity of God is affirmed by the First Vatican Council's apostolic constitution Dei Filius:

The holy Catholic Apostolic Roman Church believes and confesses that there is one true and living God, Creator and Lord of heaven and earth, almighty, eternal, immense, incomprehensible, infinite in intelligence, in will, and in all perfection, who, as being one, sole, absolutely simple and immutable spiritual substance, is to be declared as really and essentially distinct from the world, of supreme beatitude in and from Himself, and ineffably exalted above all things which exist, or are conceivable, except Himself.

— Dei Filius, Chapter I

=== Criticism ===
The concept of divine simplicity as espoused by Thomas Aquinas was condemned, alongside Thomism in general, in a Patriarchal Synod of 1368 organised by the Patriarch of Constantinople Philotheos I, which also canonized Gregory Palamas & re-affirmed the decision of the ninth ecumenical council on Palamas' teachings of the distinction between God's essence & energies being the dogma for the Eastern Orthodox Church.

Absolute (Thomistic) divine simplicity has been criticized by a number of Christian theologians, including John S. Feinberg, Thomas Morris, William Lane Craig, and Alvin Plantinga. In his essay "Does God Have a Nature?", Plantinga calls it "a dark saying indeed". Plantinga presents three arguments against Thomistic divine simplicity. He argues that concepts can apply univocally to God, even if language to describe God is limited, fragmentary, halting, and inchoate. He argues that “the concept of something like being a horse, for something to be a horse is known; the concept applies to an object if the object is a horse”. If no concepts apply to God, it is confusing to say that there is such a person as God; God does not have properties such as wisdom, creation and omnipotence, and would not have any properties for which there are concepts. God would not have properties such as existence or self-identification. If God transcends human experience, nothing can be said univocally about God; such a claim presupposes knowledge, transcending human experience, which applies to God. One reply to this objection is to distinguish equivocal language and analogical language; the former lacks a univocal element, but the latter has an element of univocal language.

The claim that God can only be described analogically is, according to Plantinga, a double-edged sword. If univocal language cannot be used to describe God and argue against simplicity, it cannot be used in arguments for Thomistic divine simplicity. If the usual modes of inference in reasoning about God cannot be used, it cannot be argued that God is not distinct from his properties. Plantinga concludes, "This way of thinking begins in a pious and commendable concern for God's greatness and majesty and augustness, but it ends in agnosticism and in incoherence." Edward Feser has responded to Plantinga. Feser says that Plantinga is attacking a strawman when he says that proponents of analogical (religious) language are committed to the view that the language of God is metaphorical and not literal; metaphorical language differs from analogical language, so Plantinga is conflating analogy with metaphor.

Plantinga presents three criticisms of metaphysical simplicity, saying that it is difficult to grasp the doctrine and difficult to see why anyone would accept it. According to the Thomist doctrine of simplicity states, all abstract objects are identical with God's essence and, hence, God himself. Plantinga says that this clashes with the fact that the property of being a horse is distinct from the property of being a turkey, and both are distinct from God and his essence. One response to this objection is to note a distinction between properties and predicates. A second response notes that supporters of divine simplicity do not think of God's nature as exemplifying abstract objects that are independent of God.

Plantinga says that if abstract objects that are identical with God are restricted to the properties God exemplifies, the doctrine remains problematic. Metaphysical simplicity states that God has no accidental (contingent) properties, it seems that God has accidental properties such as having created Adam and knowing that Adam sinned. Some of God's characteristics characterize him in every possible world, and others do not. Plantinga also says that the conflation of God's actuality with his potentiality is problematic. As it seems that there are characteristics God has but could have lacked, it also seems that God lacks characteristics he could have had. God has not created all the persons he will create; there is at least one individual essence that God does not now have, but will have. If so, God has potentiality with respect to that characteristic. Feser notes that someone who holds to divine simplicity does not have to hold to this view; one can think that God has "Cambridge" properties, which are properties in a loose sense (such as the "property" of being a husband or creating a universe).

Plantinga's third critique challenges the heart of simplicity. Metaphysical simplicity claims that there is no divine composition; there is no complexity of properties in God, and he is identical with his nature and each of his properties. According to Plantinga, this view has two difficulties. If God is identical with each of his properties, each of his properties is identical with each of his other properties; God has only one property. This flies in the face of the idea that God has power and mercy, neither of which is identical with the other. If God is identical with his properties and each of God's properties is a property, God is a property and has one property: himself. However, properties do not cause anything; no property could have created the world, and no property could know anything. If God is a property, he is an abstract object with no power, life, love, or awareness. Feser notes that this objection assumes a Platonist metaphysics about abstract objects. Supporters of divine simplicity do not think of God as a Platonic-abstract property or impersonal; God is personal, personhood, and intelligent. God does not only have the concrete property of divine simplicity; for God, God is God's essential "properties" (attributes). A distinction exists between properties and predicates, so humans distinguish power from mercy; in divine simplicity, power and mercy are the same things in God. Vallicella responds to Plantinga by arguing that Plantinga's objections assume a non-constituent ontology and are unconvincing. In his 1983 review of "Does God Have a Nature?", Alfred J. Freddoso wrote that Plantinga's critique lacks the depth of analysis to propose jettisoning the theological basis of divine simplicity laid in Christian thought by Augustine, Anselm, Bonaventure, Aquinas, Scotus, Ockham, and others.

William Lane Craig calls the Thomistic view of property simplicity "philosophically and theologically unacceptable", also objecting to divine simplicity. According to the doctrine, God is similar in all possible worlds. Since the statement "God knows x" is equivalent to "x is true", it is inexplicable why those worlds vary if, in every one, God knows, loves, and wills the same things. Feser responded to Craig's objections to divine simplicity. Morris calls it is an idea whose implications are difficult to defend, and whose advantages can be had in other ways. It is an idea whose motivation, under close scrutiny, unconvincing. John S. Feinberg writes, "These philosophical problems plus the biblical considerations raised earlier lead me to conclude that simplicity is not one of the divine attributes. This doesn't mean that God has physical parts, but that the implications of the doctrine of metaphysical simplicity are too problematic to maintain the doctrine." Jordan Barrett responded to the claim that divine simplicity is not biblical.

Jeffrey Brower and Michael Bergmann present a truthmaker defense of divine simplicity. Saying "God is omnibenevolent" means that "God is his omnibenevolence"; God is not identical to a property of omnibenevolence; he is identical to God's goodness, and identical to himself. Vallicella says, "Accordingly, to say that God is identical to his omniscience is just to say that God is identical to the truthmaker of 'God is omniscient'. And that amounts to saying that God is identical to God. In this way, one avoids the absurdity of saying that God is identical to a property. What God is identical to is not the property of omniscience but the referent of 'God's omniscience,' which turns out to be God himself. And similarly for the rest of God's intrinsic and essential attributes." Another truthmaker theory posits a moderate version of divine simplicity between absolute divine simplicity (God is not composed of metaphysical parts) and minimal divine simplicity (God is not composed of spatial, temporal or material parts). The deadlock of absolute divine simplicity. According to this view, God would not be composed but would be complex. Yann says, "The minimal truthmaker requirement can then be assumed without any contradiction with divine simplicity. <God is good> is true in virtue of the perfection of God, that is God's goodness. <God is omniscient> is true in virtue of another perfection of God, God's omniscience. We do not have to say that God is identical with His goodness or His omniscience."

Zachary Manis is against the use of the doctrine of divine simplicity in discussions regarding the Problem of Hell. In an article written to respond to Aidan Kimel’s arguments which support Universalism, Zachary Manis claimed, " If one begins with the doctrine of divine simplicity (“the God whose being is pure actuality, whose attributes are identical to his essence, whose acting is his creating”), then of course it makes no sense to claim that the eternal suffering of the damned is unintended. But that’s an objection to some other, imaginary model, not the divine presence model."

=== Scriptural arguments ===
Writers such as Herman Bavinck and Louis Berkhof have argued that the doctrine of divine simplicity is affirmed by the Epistle of John, since its author seems to identify God with love and light. Theologians such as Charles Caldwell Ryrie have argued that divine simplicity underscores the scriptural view of God's self-existence.

Advocates of the doctrine have also argued that it is affirmed by Old Testament passages such as Exodus 3:14 (identifying God as "being"), Deuteronomy 6:4 (seen as affirming the oneness of God) and Jeremiah 23:6, identifying God with righteousness. Critics of the doctrine say that it is unlikely that the biblical authors had metaphysics in mind in the verses used, and the lack of explicit verses on the doctrine argues against it.

== Islamic thought ==
Views of divine simplicity were championed by the Mu'tazili, which resulted in an apophatic theology. By postulating a distinction between existence and essence for all created beings, which was perceived to be uniquely absent in God, Al-Farabi established another model of divine simplicity. Ibn Sinā supported and elaborated this position; Al-Ghazali contested this identification of divine essence and existence, but saw divine attributes and acts as enveloped in (and indistinct from) the divine essence. This view of divine simplicity was shared with critics of Muslim philosophical writers such as Ibn Taymiyyah.

== See also ==
- Aseity
- Ein Sof (a Jewish Kabalistic concept of divine unity)
- Essence-Energies Distinction (Trinitarian, doctrine of the Eastern Orthodox Church)
- Euthyphro dilemma
- Pantheism (conception of God)
- Tawhid (the Islamic concept of divine unity)
- Unitarianism (concept of divine unity – opposite Trinitarianism)
- Wahdat al-Wujood (Sufi conception of God which borders on Pantheistic and Panentheistic conceptions)

== Bibliography ==
- Burell, David. Aquinas: God and Action. London; Routledge & Kegan Paul, 1979.
- Burell, David. Knowing the Unknowable God: Ibn-Sina, Maimonides, Aquinas. Notre Dame: Notre Dame University Press, 1986.
- Brower, Jeffrey. "Making Sense of Divine Simplicity", Faith and Philosophy 25 (1) (2008): 3–30.
- Dolezal, James. God without Parts: Divine Simplicity and the Metaphysics of God's Absoluteness. Eugene: Pickwick Publications, 2011.
- Dolezal, James. "Trinity, Simplicity and the Status of God's Personal Relations", International Journal of Systematic Theology 16 (1) (2014): 79–98.
- Leftow, Brian. "Is God an Abstract Object?". Nous. 1990.
- Maimonides, Moses. The Guide of the Perplexed, trans. M Friedländer. New York: Dover, 1956.
- Plantinga, Alvin. Does God Have a Nature?. Milwaukee: Marquette University Press, 1980.
- Plato. Parmenides. Many editions.
- Plotinus. Enneads V, 4, 1; VI, 8, 17; VI, 9, 9–10. Many editions.
- Pseudo-Dionysius. The Divine Names in Pseudo-Dionysius: The Complete Works, trans. Colm Luibheid. New York: Paulist Press, 1987.
- Radde-Gallwitz, Andrew. Basil of Caesarea, Gregory of Nyssa, and the Transformation of Divine Simplicity. Oxford: Oxford University Press, 2009.
- Stump, Eleonore and Kretzmann, Norman. “Absolute Simplicity”. Faith and Philosophy. 1985.
- Thomas Aquinas. On Being and Essence (De Esse et Essentia), 2nd ed., trans. Armand Maurer, CSB. Toronto: Pontifical Institute of Medieval Studies, 1968.
- Thomas Aquinas. Summa Theologica I, Q. 3, A. 3 "On the Simplicity of God". Many editions.
- Weigel, Peter. Aquinas on Simplicity: An Investigation into the Foundations of His Philosophical Theology. Bern: Peter Lang, 2008.
- Wolterstorff, Nicholas. "Divine Simplicity", In Philosophical Perspectives 5: Philosophy of Religion. Atascadero, Calif.: Ridgeview Publishing, 1991, 531–552.
