= Ninth Ecumenical Council =

The Ninth Ecumenical Council may refer to:

- The First Council of the Lateran of 1123
- The Fifth Council of Constantinople of 1341
