= Kydones =

Kydones is a surname. Notable people with the surname include:

- Demetrios Kydones (1324–1398 ), Byzantine theologian, translator, writer and influential statesman
- Prochoros Kydones (c. 1330 – c. 1369), Latinized as Prochorus Cydones or Prochorus Cydonius was an Eastern Orthodox monk, theologian, and linguist

Kydones may also refer to the ancient people of Kydonia in Crete.
