= Callistus I of Constantinople =

Ecumenical Patriarch of Constantinople from 1350 to 1353 and from 1355 to 1363

Saint Callistus I of Constantinople
- Ecumenical Patriarch of Constantinople
- Church: Church of Constantinople
- In office: 10 June 1350 – 15 August 1353; January 1355 – August 1363
- Predecessor: Isidore I of Constantinople; Philotheus I of Constantinople
- Successor: Philotheus I of Constantinople; Philotheus I of Constantinople

Personal details
- Died: August 1363 Serbia

Sainthood
- Feast day: 20 June
- Venerated in: Eastern Orthodox Church

Callistus I of Constantinople (Medieval Greek: Κάλλιστος; died August 1363) was the Ecumenical Patriarch of Constantinople for two periods from June 1350 to 1353 and from 1354 to 1363. Callistus I was an Athonite monk and supporter of Gregory Palamas. He died in Constantinople in August 1363.

== Life ==
Nothing is known of Callistus' early life. He was a disciple of Gregory Palamas and Gregory of Sinai. He lived at Mount Athos for 28 years and was a monk at the Skete of Magoula near Philotheou Monastery at Mount Athos.

In his "Hagiography of Gregory of Sinai", he mentions two devotees, Jakov of Serres and Romylos of Vidin, then living and writing in Serbia. He also founded the Monastery of Saint Mamas at Tenedos, a small island near the Dardanelles.

== Patriarchate ==
Callistus was elected to the throne of the see of Constantinople on 10 June 1350, succeeding Isidore I of Constantinople. In 1351, he convened a synod in Constantinople that finally established the Orthodoxy of Hesychasm.

Callistus I and the ecumenical patriarchs who succeeded him mounted a vigorous campaign to have the Palamite doctrine accepted by the other Eastern patriarchates as well as all the metropolitan sees under their jurisdiction. However, it took some time to overcome initial resistance to the doctrine. One example of resistance was the response of the Metropolitan of Kyiv who, upon receiving tomes from Kallistos that expounded the Palamist doctrine, rejected the new doctrine vehemently and composed a reply refuting it.

According to Martin Jugie, contemporary historians depict Callistus I as a "doctrinaire and brutal man whose persecuting zeal it was necessary to restrain".

In 1353, Callistus I refused to crown Matthew Kantakouzenos, son of emperor John VI Kantakouzenos, as emperor with his father and, as a result, was deposed. After his deposition, Callistus I returned to Mount Athos. In 1354, after John VI abdicated, Callistus I returned as patriarch. After his return, Callistus I worked to strengthen the administration of the Patriarchate. He reorganized the parish system of churches under the surveillance of a patriarchal exarch. He also strove to strengthen patriarchal control over various Orthodox church jurisdictions, even to the extent of excommunicating Stefan Dušan, for establishing the Serbian archbishop as an independent patriarch.

In 1355, Callistus I wrote to the clergy of Trnovo that those Latins who had baptised by single immersion should be re-baptised. He called the baptism by one immersion most improper and full of impiety. His view was based on the Apostolic canons which clearly state that those baptised by one immersion are not baptised and should be re-baptised.

== Death ==
Callistus I died in August 1363 while he was en route to Serres as a member of the embassy of emperor John V Palaiologos seeking aid from Helena of Bulgaria, Empress of Serbia against the Ottoman Empire.

While Callistus I was Patriarch, he once passed through Mount Athos on his way to Serbia and met Maximos of Kafsokalyvia, who greeted the Patriarch in a humorous manner, "This old man will never see his old lady again". This turned out to be a prophecy of how Callistus I would never see Constantinople ("his old lady") again, since he would die before being able to return there. Maximos then bid farewell to Callistus I by chanting, "Blessed are the blameless in the way" (from Psalm 118, a funeral psalm). Callistus I subsequently journeyed on to Serbia, where he then died. (Note that the "Callistus I" in this account is often confused with Callistus II of Constantinople, who reigned as Patriarch in 1397, after the death of Maximos of Kafsokalyvia.)

== Works ==
With another monk, Ignatius Xanthopoulos, with whom he had developed a life-long friendship at Mount Athos, Callistus I composed the important Century, a tract of 100 sections on the ascetical practices of the Hesychastic monks; it was incorporated in the Philokalia of Nicodemus the Hagiorite and had a great influence on Orthodox spirituality. In the Philokalia, the full title of the work is An exact rule and method with God's help for those who choose to live as hesychasts and monastics by the monks Kallistos and Ignatios Xanthopoulos, including testimonies from the saints.

Callistus I wrote the life of his teacher Gregory of Sinai probably around 1351. The date of composition is suggested by the editor based on the references to Callistus I's clash with Nicephorus Gregoras at the final Palamite council.

== See also ==
- Palamism
- Hesychast controversy

== Bibliography ==
- Gonis, Dimitrios (1980). Το συγγραφικόν έργον του Οικουμενικού Πατριάρχου Καλλίστου Α'. (contains an edition of the writings of Callistus I).
- Beyer, Hans-Veit (2006). "Каллист I, патриарх Константинополя. Житие и деятельность иже во святых отца нашего Григория Синаита" (PDF). Ekaterinburg: Ural Federal University. ISBN 5-7525-1484-3. (Life and Works of Our Late Father Gregory of Sinai; critical edition of the Greek text and Russian translation).

Eastern Orthodox Church titles
Preceded by Isidore I	Ecumenical Patriarch of Constantinople; 1350 – 1354	Succeeded by Philotheus I
Preceded by Philotheus I	Ecumenical Patriarch of Constantinople; 1355 – 1363	Succeeded by Philotheus I (2)
