= Papamichael =

Papamichael (Greek: Παπαμιχαήλ) is a Greek surname. Notable people with the surname include:

- Constantinos Papamichael (born 1993), Cypriot alpine skier
- Dimitris Papamichael (1934–2004), Greek actor
- Gregorios Papamichael (1875–1956), Greek theologian and writer
- Phedon Papamichael (born 1962), Greek cinematographer and film director
