= Diataxis =

Guide for Orthodox religious services

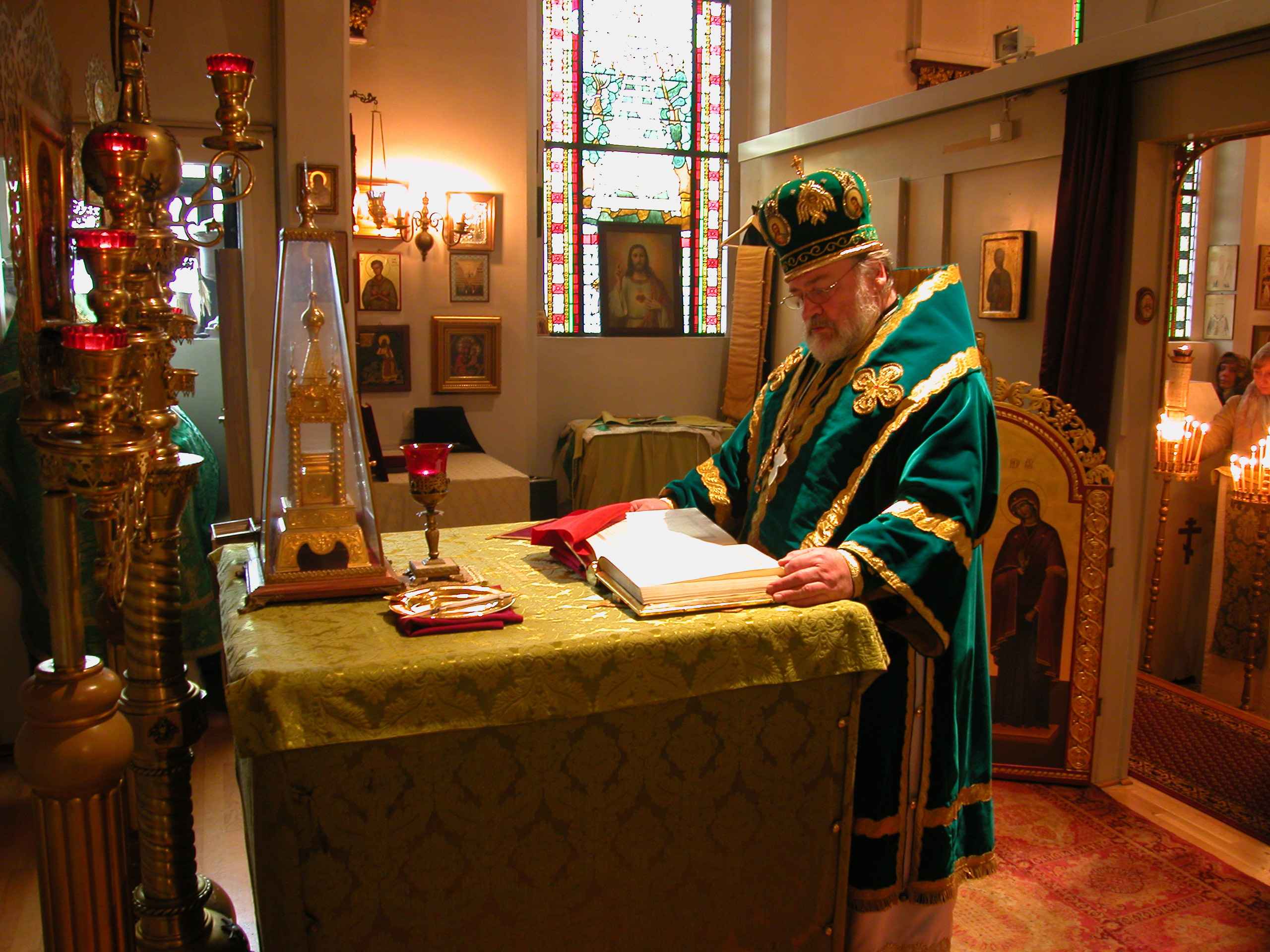

In Eastern Orthodoxy, a diataxis (διάταξις, 'order'; plural diataxeis) is a guidebook for the service of the Divine Liturgy. The term is sometimes applied to similar books for Vespers, Orthros or ordinations. It corresponds to the Latin ordo and directorium.

Diataxeis consist of rubrics to accompany the Euchologion (prayer book) and guide the officiant. They originated in the tenth century, but the earliest surviving examples date to the twelfth. The diataxis for the Liturgy of the Presanctified Gifts attributed to Theodore of Stoudios (died 826) is not authentic. The diataxis of Philotheos Kokkinos became the authoritative one during his patriarchate (1364–1376).

The term diataxis is sometimes applied to the typikon and also to wills and inventories. Diataxis is also the title of one of the works of Stephen of Thebes. The chapters of the Taktika of Leo the Wise, a military treatise, are called diataxeis.
