= John XIV of Constantinople =

Ecumenical Patriarch of Constantinople from 1334 to 1347

- Ecumenical Patriarch of Constantinople
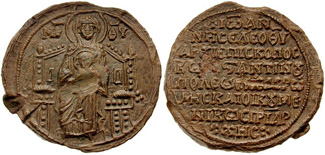
- Seal of John XIV of Constantinople
- Church: Church of Constantinople
- In office: February 1334 – 2 February 1347
- Predecessor: Isaias of Constantinople
- Successor: Isidore I of Constantinople

Personal details
- Born: John Kalekas c. 1282 Aprus (Thrace)
- Died: 29 December 1347 (aged 65) Constantinople
- Denomination: Eastern Orthodoxy

John XIV of Constantinople, surnamed Kalekas (Greek: Ἰωάννης Καλέκας; c. 1282 – 29 December 1347), was the Ecumenical Patriarch of Constantinople from 1334 to 1347. He was an anti-hesychast and opponent of Gregory Palamas. He was an active participant in the Byzantine civil war of 1341–1347 as a member of the regency for Emperor John V Palaiologos, against Emperor John VI Kantakouzenos.

== Personal life ==
John Kalekas was born about the year 1282 in Aprus (Thrace). After having grown up in modest circumstances, John was married and had a son and daughter.

== Career ==
He was ordained a priest. John came under the patronage of John Kantakouzenos, the chief minister of Emperor Andronikos III Palaiologos and later megas domestikos, who introduced him to the imperial court. In 1334, against the resistance of the patriarchal synod, John Kantakouzenos led John Kalekas to his election, first, as Metropolis of Thessaloniki and, then, as patriarch of Constantinople, where he succeeded patriarch Isaias of Constantinople.

About the year 1337, during the patriarchate of John XIV, a Calabrian monk, Barlaam of Seminara, who was the abbot of the Monastery of the Saint Savior in Chora, learned of the practice of hesychasm during a visit to Mount Athos. Barlaam, trained in western scholastic theology, was scandalised and began to campaign against the practice and its advocate Gregory Palamas. The dispute grew until 1341, when emperor Andronikos III, a supporter of Gregory Palamas, convened the Fifth Council of Constantinople (1341–1368). Although he was supportive of Barlaam, John XIV did not resist his condemnation; after his condemnation Barlaam left Constantinople permanently. Thereafter, Barlaam's cause was taken up by Gregory Akindynos. In 1344, in a synod convened by John Kantakouzenos, where the patriarch John XIV was absent, Gregory Akindynos was also condemned.

In 1345, having finally committed to the Barlaam party, Patriarch John XIV convened a synod that excommunicated Gregory Palamas from the Church and had him imprisoned for three years, until after John XIV's death in 1347. During the same synod, John XIV also had Bishop Isidore of Monembasia, a disciple of Gregory, excommunicated.

After the death of emperor Andronikos III Palaiologos in June 1341, two factions emerged at the imperial court concerned with the regency for the infant co-emperor John V Palaiologos. Aided by the intrigues of Alexios Apokaukos, the two sides engaged in a Byzantine civil war that lasted until 1347. After some maneuvering one faction formed around John Kantakouzenos, who was a supporter of Gregory Palamas, and included the provincial magnates from Macedonia and Thrace. The other faction, which seized imperial power, was led by Patriarch John XIV and Alexios Apokaukos and supported Andronikos III's widow Anna of Savoy in her efforts to assume the regency for the young John V Palaiologos. In forming the faction, Anna made Patriarch John XIV a regent and appointed Alexios Apokaukos an eparchos (urban prefect).

Initially, the regency held the upper hand, but by 1345 John Kantakouzenos, aided by help from Orhan of the Ottoman emirate and the murder of Alexios Apokaukos, dealt the regency a severe blow. In 1346, John VI Kantakouzenos was crowned co-emperor in Adrianople and entered Constantinople in February 1347. Then, the regency war ended with the agreement that John Kantakouzenos would be the senior emperor and regent for John V Palaiologos until he was old enough to rule on his own.

=== Synod of 1347 ===
A synod was held in February 1347 which deposed John XIV, exiling him to Didymoteicho, and also excommunicated Gregory Akindynos. Isidore I of Constantinople, who had been excommunicated by the synod of 1344, was now made patriarch.

Within days after the end of the conciliabulum, John VI Kantakouzenos victoriously entered Constantinople and forced his opponents to crown him co-emperor. One of his first acts was to confirm the deposition of John XIV and to approve the synodal tome that had just been issued against him. The hesychasm dispute continued through a synod convened by Barlaam supporters that refused to accept Patriarch Isidore I before a final settlement of the dispute came about at a sixth synod in 1351 during the patriarchate of Callistus I of Constantinople.

== Final years ==
In the latter part of 1347, the deposed John XIV was returned from exile to Constantinople where he died later in the year.

== Bibliography ==
- Klaus-Peter Todt (1992). "Johannes XIV, Kalekas, Ökumen, Patriarch von Konstantinopel". In Bautz, Friedrich Wilhelm (ed.). Biographisch-Bibliographisches Kirchenlexikon (BBKL) (in German). Vol. 3. Herzberg: Bautz. cols. 426–428. ISBN 3-88309-035-2.
- Catholic Encyclopedia - Hesychasm.
- Sainted Gregory Palamas, Archbishop of Thessalonika.

Eastern Orthodox Church titles
Preceded by Isaias	Ecumenical Patriarch of Constantinople; 1334 – 1347	Succeeded by Isidore I
