= Gregorios Papamichael =

Gregorios Papamichael (Greek: Γρηγόριος Παπαμιχαήλ) (1875–1956) was a theologian of the Orthodox Church of Greece and a professor at the Theology School of the University of Athens (1918-1920, and 1923-1939).

He examined various cultural aspects of church life and is jointly credited, together with his close friend Archbishop Chrysostomos I (Papadopoulos) of Athens (1923-1938), for establishing the two basic academic journals of Neohellenic theology: Theologia and Ekklesia. In addition, he was responsible for the modern rediscovery of two almost forgotten great personalities of Orthodoxy, namely Gregorios Palamas and Maximos (Trivolis) the Greek.

== Biography ==
=== Early life and education ===
Gregorios Papamichael was born in the village of Íppeios on Lesbos in 1875. He completed his education at the Gymnasium of Mytilene, as well as in Samos, and also at the Holy Cross School of Jerusalem. (Note: The "Holy Cross School of Jerusalem" (Theological School of the Patriarchal Throne of Jerusalem) was founded in 1855 under Patriarch Cyril II of Jerusalem (1845-1872), and was located at the Monastery of the Holy Cross. It functioned for about fifty years with some interruptions (1855-1909).) He then studied theology at the Theological School of Halki.

Later he worked as a teacher in the Greek community of Sofia, Bulgaria.

Finally he continued his theological studies at the Theological Academy of St. Petersburg, Russia, where he was granted his Master of Theology degree in 1905 for his thesis: "St. Gregory Palamas, Archbishop of Thessaloniki." (Note: "Another pioneer work of earlier date is Gregorios Papamichael, Ο Άγιος Γρηγόριος ο Παλαμάς (St Petersburg/Alexandria, 1911), a serious study which had, however, little impact on Orthodox theology at the time. It was of course Vladimir Lossky, in his Essai sur la théologie mystique de l'Eglise d'Orient (Paris, 1944; English translation, London, 1957), who first brought Palamism to the attention of a wider public, non-Orthodox as well as Orthodox.")

=== Academic career ===
From 1905-1907 he taught as professor at the Theological School of the Cross in Jerusalem, publishing studies in the journal "New Zion".

Over the next ten years, he took over management of the two periodicals of the Patriarchate of Alexandria, "Clerical Lighthouse" (Note: (in Greek) «Ἐκκλησιαστικὸς Φάρος».) and "Pantainos", (Note: (in Greek) «Πάνταινος».) to which he added significant prestige, publishing valuable articles and studies.

In 1918, he was unanimously elected ordinary professor of Apologetics and of the Encyclopedia of Theology, at the Theological School of Athens University (1918-1920, and 1923-1939), while also teaching at the Rizarios Ecclesiastical School in Athens, where he served as Dean from 1937-1940. (Note: Saint Nektarios of Pentapolis had also previously served as the Dean of the Rizarios Ecclesiastical School, from 1894 to 1908.)

He served concurrently as the Dean of the School of Theology, as well as the Rector of the University of Athens from 1936-1937, and organized the celebrations for the University's centenary (i.e. 1837-1937).

In 1945, he was elected a member of the Academy of Athens, later serving as the president of the Academy in 1954.

Parallel to his didactic and literary labours, Gregorios Papamichael undertook ecclesiastical and social activities, taking charge of the periodicals Ecclesiastical Herald (Note: (in Greek) «Ἐκκλησιαστικὸς Κήρυξ».) and New Didache, (Note: (in Greek) «Καινὴ Διδαχή».) and later the periodicals Theologia (Note: (in Greek) «Θεολογίας».) and Ekklesia, (Note: (in Greek) «Ἐκκλησίας».) publishing many articles and studies.

Professor Gregorios Papamichael died in 1956.

== Literary production ==
His literary production was vast and rich, covering many theological disciplines. He published seventy (70) major theological works in the fields of apologetics, ethics, hagiography, Patrology, and history, as well as over a thousand smaller publications, ecclesiastical articles and book reviews.

As a theologian and academic instructor Gregorios Papamichael combined scientific profundity with literary grace. His ecclesiastical columns in the theological journals, such as in the journal "Theologia", testify to his great love and devotion to the work and the mission of the Eastern Orthodox Church.

== See also ==
- Palamism - Modern rediscovery of Palamas

== Sources ==
- Panagiotes K. Christou. Neohellenic Theology at the Crossroads. The Greek Orthodox Theological Review. 28, n. 1, Spring 1983, p. 39-54.
- (in Greek) ΓΡΗΓΟΡΙΟΣ ΠΑΠΑΜΙΧΑΗΛ (1874-1956). Εκκλησία της Ελλάδος (Περιοδικό ΘΕΟΛΟΓΙΑ). Retrieved: 2013-08-27.
- (in Greek) Δημήτριος Μπαλάνος (Εθνικόν και Καποδιστριακόν Πανεπιστήμιον Αθηνών). Εκατονταετηρίς 1837-1937, Τόμος Α', Ιστορία της Θεολογικής Σχολής. Αθήναι: Πυρσός Α.Ε., 1937. σελ. 15.
- (in Greek) Πρόεδροι της Ακαδημίας Αθηνών από την ίδρυσή της. Ακαδημία Αθηνών. (Academy of Athens). Retrieved: 2013-08-27.
- (in Greek) Τακτικά μέλη της Ακαδημίας Αθηνών κατά σειρά εκλογής. Ακαδημία Αθηνών. (Academy of Athens). Retrieved: 2013-08-27.
