= Philotheos Kokkinos =

Ecumenical Patriarch of Constantinople from 1353 to 1354 and from 1364 to 1376

Saint Philotheos Kokkinos
- Ecumenical Patriarch of Constantinople
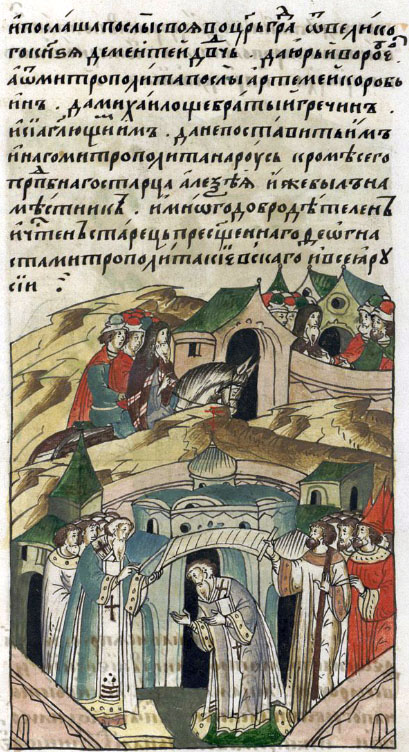
- Miniature from the Illustrated Chronicle of Ivan the Terrible (16th century)
- Church: Church of Constantinople
- In office: August 1353 – December 1354; 8 October 1364 – August 1376
- Predecessor: Callistus I of Constantinople; Callistus I of Constantinople
- Successor: Callistus I of Constantinople; Macarius of Constantinople

Personal details
- Born: Philotheos Kokkinos c. 1300 Thessalonica
- Died: 1379 Constantinople

Sainthood
- Feast day: 11 October
- Venerated in: Eastern Orthodox Church
- Theological work
- Language: Greek
- Tradition or movement: Palamism
- Main interests: Hesychasm; Palamism; Hymnography

Philotheos Kokkinos (Greek: Φιλόθεος Κόκκινος; c. 1300 – 1379) was the Ecumenical Patriarch of Constantinople for two periods from August 1353 to December 1354 and from 8 October 1364 to August 1376, and a leader of the Byzantine monastic and religious revival in the 14th century. His numerous theological, liturgical, and canonical works received wide circulation not only in Byzantium but throughout the Slavic Orthodox world. (Note: "The surname Kokkinos (Κόκκινοϛ), the "red-haired", which belonged to Philotheos, is attributed by Nicephorus Gregoras to "his fire-like and wild appearance" (διὰ τὸ πυρῶδεϛ καὶ ἄγριον τῆϛ ὄψεωϛ). In reality, one may rather presume that "Kokkinos" was his family name".)

Philotheus I was appointed patriarch in August 1353 by the emperor John VI Kantakouzenos, deposed by John V Palaiologos in December 1354, then restored to the patriarchal throne on 8 October 1364. He opposed Emperor John V in his intent to negotiate the political re-union of the churches with Popes Urban V and Gregory XI. Instead, in 1367 he supported the proposed assembly of an authentic, ecumenical union-council, in order to properly resolve the differences with the Western Church.

Philotheus I is commemorated on 11 October, and is regarded as a "Protector of Orthodoxy", alongside Saints Photius I of Constantinople, Mark of Ephesus, and Gregory Palamas. (Note: Saints Photius I, Mark of Ephesus, and Gregory Palamas, have been called the Three Pillars of Orthodoxy)

== Early life ==
Philotheus' early life is not known. He was a native of Thessalonika and is believed to have been born about the year 1300. His mother was a Jewish convert to Orthodox Christianity.

He was taught by the Thomas Magister (d. 1347), one of the most learned men of the time, and showed great talent for theological as well as secular studies.

== Early career ==
Philotheus entered the monastic life early, first becoming a monk at Mount Sinai, then later at Mount Athos.

At Mount Athos, he lived his monastic life first at Vatopedi monastery, where he formed a relationship with Savvas the New of Kalymnos the Fool-For-Christ (d. 1350), for whom he became a biographer. Later he went on to the Great Lavra Monastery, where he formed a relationship with Saint Gregory Palamas, for whom he became a biographer as well.

He was a supporter of Saint Gregory Palamas and became a follower and advocate of the form of contemplative prayer called Hesychasm, and the Orthodox theology of uncreated Grace. As a writer of note, Philotheus wrote works on the theology of the Uncreated Energies of God and refuted the scholastic philosophy that was then current in the Western church. His most famous work, written in 1339, was the Hagiorite Tome, the manifesto of the Athonite monks on how the saints partake of the Divine and uncreated Light that the Apostles beheld at the Transfiguration of Jesus.

In 1340 he was appointed abbot of the Monastery of Philokalou in Thessalonica but was soon recalled to Mount Athos in 1344 to direct the Great Lavra as the Hegumen.

In recognition of his contribution in the Hesychast controversy, Patriarch Isidore I of Constantinople appointed him Metropolitan of Heraclea in Thrace in 1347. However becoming a protégé of co-Emperor John VI Kantakouzenos, Bishop Philotheus spent most of his time in Constantinople. During his absence, the city of Heraclea fell prey to the rivalry of the Genoese and the Venetians. In 1351 the Genoese led by admiral Paganino Doria sacked his episcopal see of Heraclea. It was only due to the intervention of Bishop Philotheus that a large number of the inhabitants which were imprisoned by the Genoese, were set free. Thereafter he preserved a firm personal antagonism against the Genoese for the rest of his life.

In 1351, he took part in the "Hesychast Council" in Constantinople and wrote its Acts. (Note: Six patriarchal sessions of the Ninth Ecumenical Council (or Fifth Council of Constantinople) were held in Constantinople between 1341 and 1351. The six sessions, referred to also as the Hesychast councils or the Palamite councils, were held on: 10 June 1341; August 1341; 4 November 1344; 1 February 1347; 8 February 1347; 28 May 1351.)

== First patriarchate ==
In August 1353, Philotheus I, renowned for his learning and his Orthodoxy, was appointed Patriarch of Constantinople by John VI Kantakouzenos.

In December 1354, after John V Palaiologos obtained the abdication of John VI Kantakouzenos and forced him into a monastery under the name Joseph Christodoulus, he forced also the deposition of Patriarch Philotheus I, who resumed the see of Heraclea.

== Second patriarchate ==
On 8 February 1364, Philotheus I was recalled to the patriarchal throne in Constantinople on the death of Callistus I of Constantinople.

=== Relations with Rome ===
Since 1354 the Ottoman Empire had gained a foothold in Europe at Gallipoli, threatening Constantinople from a new side. By 1362 Adrianople fell to the Ottomans and served as the forward base for Ottoman expansion into Europe. Threatened anew, John V Palaiologos appealed to the West for help in defending Constantinople against the Turks, proposing, in return, to end the East–West Schism between Constantinople and Rome. In October 1369 John V, having travelled through Naples to Rome, formally converted to Catholicism in St. Peter's Basilica and recognised the Pope as supreme head of the Church. Opposed to re-union on political terms, Philotheus I opposed these efforts by John V to negotiate with Popes Urban V (1362–1370) and Gregory XI (1370–1378).

On the other hand, Philotheus I's second period as Patriarch was notable for his efforts to open sincere discussions with the Roman Church to end the East–West Schism — not by diplomatic efforts like those of Emperor John V, who had just abjured Orthodoxy for the Latin faith — but out of a real desire for a true and authentic union. To this end, in 1367 he was in favour of holding an ecumenical union-council to resolve the differences with the Western Church, however the discussions came to nothing as the idea was rejected by Pope Urban V in 1369. This unfortunate end signalled to Philotheus I the suspension of any further efforts to approach the West. (Note: "The idea of a "union council", i.e. a council between the churches of East and West after the East–West Schism, was promoted by the Greek side in the late Middle Ages in an effort to restore union. The papacy was reluctant to accept the concept ... Several offers of a union council were thus made on behalf of the Byzantines. These included not only the project presented to Pope Benedict XII in 1339 by Barlaam of Seminara but also several offers made by the conservative monastic leadership which took over the Byzantine Church after 1347. In 1367 the emperor – monk John VI Kantakouzenos, speaking to the papal legate Paul on behalf of the Greek Church, offered "to hold a catholic and ecumenical council ... The project was officially approved by the Synod and the patriarchs of Alexandria and Jerusalem; the hesychast Patriarch Philotheus I of Constantinople announced the news to the archbishop of Ochrid and informed him that "agreement was reached with the pope's envoys that, if our doctrine" (i.e. that of the Eastern Church) will be shown at the council to be superior to that of the Latins, they will join us and confess it" (Miklosich-Müller, Acta, I, 492). Rejected by Pope Urban V in 1369, the project was to be revived after the triumph of "conciliarist" theories in the West, and would finally result in the council of Ferrara-Florence".)

=== Synod in 1368 ===
The authority of the Acts of the "Hesychast Council" of 1351 were confirmed in the synod of 1368. (Note: The Bulgarian Council of Trnovo in 1360 also confirmed the decisions from the previous Hesychast councils, and hesychasm became an official dogma of the Byzantine church.) In addition, Philotheus I led the synodal decision to proclaim Gregory Palamas a Saint, ordaining the Second Sunday of Great Lent to be his feast and composing the Church's services to Saint Gregory Palamas.

A notable example of the campaign to enforce the Orthodoxy of the Palamite doctrine was the condemnation of Prochoros Kydones at this synod. Applying Aristotelian logic to the Neoplatonic character of Hesychasm, Prochoros had accused Palamas of Pantheism or Polytheism. In the end, Prochoros was excommunicated and deposed from the clergy in perpetuity. (Note: The reply of Demetrios Kydones to the Hesychasts upon his excommunication under Patriarch Philotheus I is considered a classic of Roman Catholic polemic against Hesychasm.)

The 1368 synod would be ranked as part of the Fifth Council of Constantinople in 2016 by the Council of Crete, thus granting it "universal authority" and Ecumenical status.

=== Relations with the Slavic Orthodox world ===
Philotheus I also nourished a strong commitment to the unity of the Orthodox world in his second tenure, pursuing an ecclesiastical policy to organize the Orthodox churches of the Serbians, Russians, and Bulgarians, unto which hesychastic theology and spirituality spread.

About 1354 Saint Sergius of Radonezh, the founder of the Trinity monastery, was visited by envoys from Patriarch Philotheus, urging him to introduce a community rule into his monastery, as the Byzantines placed increased value on Cenobitic monasticism in this period. After some hesitation, Saint Sergius complied with this request, and the Trinity monastery, by adopting the Studite Constitution, became the model for all other late medieval Russian Koinonia. Secondly, the monastery's close links with Constantinople facilitated the spread of Hesychasm to Central and Northern Russia.

Since one of the obstacles to a united Orthodox front was the schism — since 1350 — which separated the Patriarchate of Constantinople and the Serbian Patriarchate of Peć, Philotheus I recognized the latter in 1375 and restored unity. The act of excommunication of was revoked and the Serbian Church was recognized as a Patriarchate, under the condition of returning all eparchies in contested southern regions to the jurisdiction of the Patriarchate of Constantinople.

In 1375 Patriarch Philotheus I consecrated Cyprian as "Metropolitan of Kiev, Lithuania, and Russia" in the lifetime of Alexius, the lawful incumbent of two of these three sees. The Russians felt deeply humiliated by this affront to their popular metropolitan, and the confusion ended only in 1390 when the Muscovites accepted Cyprian as Metropolitan of Russia.

=== Writer and hymnographer ===
Philotheus I was also engaged in writing a number of works setting forth the theology of the uncreated Energies and successfully taking issue with the humanist theologians who, in the works of Western scholastics, especially Thomas Aquinas, found a natural philosophy that enabled them to express their love of classical antiquity to the full. In addition, he also composed admirable lives of Saints. As a hymn writer, Philotheus I is known for composing a service in commemoration of the Fathers of the Council of Chalcedon, as well composing the services to Saint Gregory Palamas.

Along with Callistus I of Constantinople, Philotheus I was a Hesychast Patriarch of Constantinople, who used the lives of saints to extol the ideal of hesychia.

=== Exile and death ===
In 1376, Patriarch Philotheus I was deposed by Emperor Andronikos IV Palaiologos when the latter ascended to the imperial throne.

Philotheus I reposed in exile in 1379. His tomb at the Monastery of Akatalyptos Maria Diakonissa (Theotokos Kyriotissa) became a place of many miracles.

== Legacy ==
Robert F. Taft affirms that the liturgical codification of the Eucharistic service of the Great Church reached its full form in the diataxis of Philotheus I of Constantinople. (Note: "Philotheus I's rubric book dates from before 1347 when he was still higoumen of the Great Lavra on Athos. It gained great prestige after Philotheus I's accession to the patriarchal throne of Constantinople in 1353, eventually became normative throughout the Byzantine Church outside Italy, and was incorporated into Demetrius Ducas' editio princeps of the liturgy (Rome, 1526)".)

== See also ==
- Palamism
- Hesychast controversy

== Bibliography ==
- Venerable Philotheus I, Patriarch of Constantinople, OCA - Lives of the Saints.
- Philotheus Kokkinos, Patriarch of Constantinople, Encyclopædia Britannica.
- St. Philotheus (Kokkinos) of Mount Athos, patriarch of Constantinople (1379), Holy Trinity Russian Orthodox Church (A parish of the Patriarchate of Moscow).
- (in Greek) Κουρούσης, Σταύρος Ι. "Φιλόθεοϛ. Ό Κόκκινοϛ. Οἰκουμενικόϛ πατριάρχηϛ (1353–1354, 1364–1376)", ΘΗΕ, τόμ. 11, εκδ. Μαρτίνος Αθ., Αθήνα 1967, στ. 1119–1126.

Eastern Orthodox Church titles
Preceded by Callistus I	Patriarch of Constantinople; 1353 – 1354	Succeeded by Callistus I (2)
Preceded by Callistus I (2)	Patriarch of Constantinople; 1364 – 1376	Succeeded by Macarius
