= Isidore I of Constantinople =

Ecumenical Patriarch of Constantinople from 1347 to 1350

- Ecumenical Patriarch of Constantinople
- Church: Church of Constantinople
- In office: 17 May 1347 – February / March 1350
- Predecessor: John XIV of Constantinople
- Successor: Callistus I of Constantinople

Personal details
- Born: Isidore Buchiras Thessaloniki
- Died: February or March 1350
- Denomination: Eastern Orthodoxy

Isidore I of Constantinople (Greek: Ἰσίδωρος; died February or March 1350) was the Ecumenical Patriarch of Constantinople from 1347 to 1350. Isidore was a disciple of Gregory Palamas.

== Early life ==
Isidore was an ethnic Greek born in Thessaloniki during the latter part of the 1290s where he became a teacher and spiritual guide.

== Career ==
As a disciple of Pope Gregory I, he was drawn into the dispute between the followers of Gregory Palamas and Barlaam of Seminara over Hesychasm during the middle decades of the fourteenth century.

== Synod of 1344 ==
In 1344, Isidore, who was at the time the bishop elect of Monemvasia, and Gregory Palamas were excommunicated by a synod of anti-hesychast bishops that had been convened by Patriarch John XIV of Constantinople who himself was an opponent of Saint Gregory.

Palamas and Isidore I recanted.

== Synods of 1347 ==
In February 1347, during a synod convened by emperor John VI Kantakouzenos, Patriarch John XIV of Constantinople was deposed and Isidore brought back and elected to succeed John XIV as patriarch of Constantinople. Upon becoming patriarch, Isidore I released Gregory Palamas from prison and consecrated him Metropolis of Thessaloniki.

== Patriarchate ==
During the two and a half years of his patriarchate, Isidore I sought to have the whole Byzantine Church accept the Palamite dogmas. He selected bishops only from the Palamite party. He instituted harsh penalties for those who refused to submit.

== See also ==
- Palamism
- Hesychast controversy

== Bibliography ==
- Evangelos C. Pringipakis, "Patriarch Isidore I Boucheiras (± 1290–1350) in the Writings of Demetrius Cydones", Byzantinos Domos 29 (2021), s. 417–439.

Eastern Orthodox Church titles
Preceded by John XIV	Ecumenical Patriarch of Constantinople; 1347 – 1350	Succeeded by Callistus I
