= Fifth Council of Constantinople =

1341–1368 ecclesiastical council

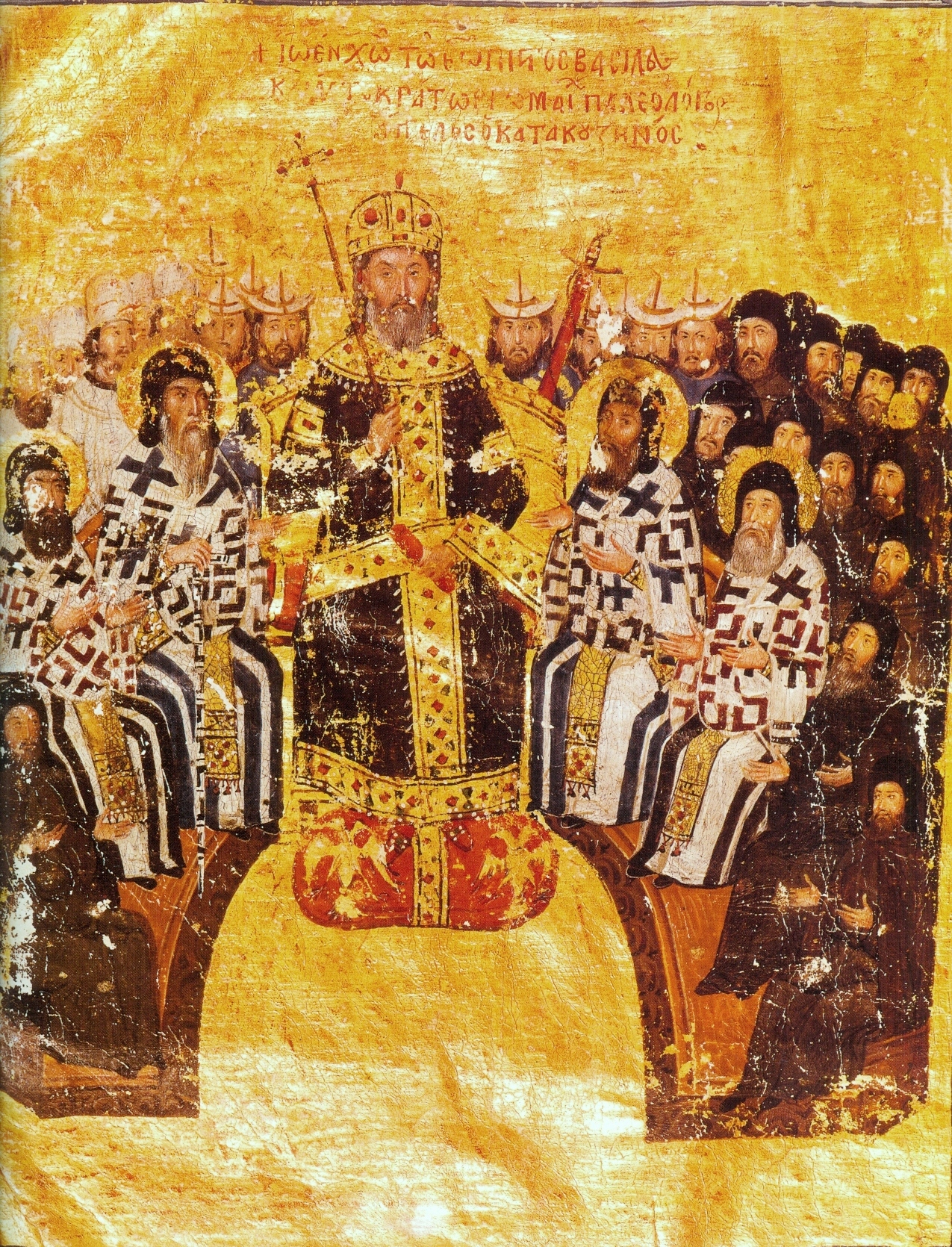
- Icon of the Hesychast Councils
- Date: 1341-1368
- Accepted by: Eastern Orthodox Church
- Previous council: Fourth Council of Constantinople (Eastern Orthodox)
- Convoked by: Emperor Andronikos III
- President: Patriarch John XIV Kalekas later Isidore Buchiras
- Topics: Hesychasm
- Documents and statements: Condemnation of Barlaam of Seminara, Gregory Akyndinus and Prochoros Kydones; affirmation of Hesychasm
- Location: Hagia Sophia cathedral In Constantinople later moved to the Palace of Blachernae

Fifth Council of Constantinople is a name given to a series of seven councils held in the Byzantine capital Constantinople between 1341 and 1368, to deal with a dispute concerning the mystical doctrine of Hesychasm. These are referred to also as the Hesychast councils or the Palamite councils, since they discussed the theology of Gregory Palamas, whom Barlaam of Seminara opposed in the first of the series, and others in the succeeding six councils.

The result of these councils is accepted as having the authority of an ecumenical council by Eastern Orthodox Christians.

The Council of Crete in 2016 reaffirmed the authority of the Fifth Council of Constantinople, stating: "The Conciliar work continues uninterrupted in history through the later councils of universal authority, such as, for example, the Great Council (879-880) convened at the time of St. Photios the Great, Patriarch of Constantinople, and also the Great Councils convened at the time of St. Gregory Palamas (1341, 1351, 1368), through which the same truth of faith was confirmed."

== History ==
As it became clear that the dispute between Barlaam and Palamas was irreconcilable and would require the judgment of an episcopal council, a series of seven patriarchal councils was held in Constantinople on 10 June 1341, August 1341, 4 November 1344, 1 February 1347, 8 February 1347, 28 May 1351, and April 6, 1368, to consider the issues.

The First Synod was convened on 10 June. It was assembled by Eastern Roman Emperor Andronicos Palaiologos III in the Church of Hagia Sophia. Patriarch John XIV Kalekas was allowed to preside at the council despite initially being an anti-hesychast. The synod condemned Barlaam, who recanted.

Barlaam's primary supporter Emperor Andronicus III died just five days after the synod ended. Although Barlaam initially hoped for a second chance to present his case against Palamas, he soon realised the futility of pursuing his cause, and left for Calabria where he converted to the Roman Church and was appointed Bishop of Gerace.

After Barlaam's departure, Gregory Akindynos became the chief critic of Palamas. A second council was convened in Constantinople by the regent John Kantakouzenos. The sessions once again took part in the Hagia Sophia cathedral. The council gathered on August 1341, condemned Akindynos and affirmed the findings of the earlier council.

Akindynos and his supporters gained a brief victory at the third synod held in 1344 which excommunicated Palamas and one of his disciples, Isidore Buchiras.

Another Synod was called on February 2, 1347. It condemned Akindynos and deposed John XIV Kalekas from the Patriarchal throne. Isidore Buchiras was chosen as Patriarch. Isidore was allowed to preside in the later sessions. The last few sessions produced a Tomos which was signed by about thirty bishops.

In July 1347 a council led by Matthew, Metropolitan of Ephesus, with some ten bishops, claiming the support of a further twenty bishops outside the capital, issued their own Anti-Palamite Synodal Tomos. Isidore retaliated in August 1347 with a Tomos against Matthew. Matthew was reconciled briefly in 1350.

In May 1351, Kantakouzenos convened a patriarchal council at the Palace of Blachernae with the intention of winning over the Anti-Palamites, led by philosopher Nikephoros Gregoras, through debate and systematic examination of patristic texts. Matthew of Ephesus was deposed and the remaining Anti-Palamites were excommunicated. A session was held later in July to offer repentance, with further examination of texts, and finally the emperors, the patriarch, and a large body of metropolitans and officials had willingly signed the Tomos. When the Council ended it had conclusively exonerated Palamas and condemned his opponents.

After the death of Gregory Palamas in 1359, hieromonk Prochoros Kydones began to come into conflict with the monastic brethren of the Great Lavra over Palamas' teachings. Eventually leading him to protest formally against the commemoration of Palamas at the Lavra as a Saint, with his case coming before the Patriarchal synod in 1368. This Council under Patriarch Philotheos Kokkinos, concluded with the condemnation of Prochoros and the synodal proclamation of Gregory Palamas as a Saint. Ending any further potential challenges to the theology of Palamas. Of possible interest is the heavy Thomistic influence on Prochoros which was also attacked at the council.

Since the Orthodox Church considered that only a council that has been called by the Byzantine Emperor can recognised as an ecumenical council, it was the last such council to be recognised as ecumenical within Eastern Orthodoxy (although some consider the Synods of Jassy, Jerusalem & Constantinople as ecumenical councils). The results of the council affected the Byzantine Civil War, with the supporters of Palamas siding on behalf of Kantakouzenos and the anti-Palamite Patriarch John XIV Kalekas supporting Empress Anna of Savoy. This in turn significantly weakened Byzantine authority to the advantage of the Bulgarian Empire and the Kingdom of Serbia, ultimately allowing for the Ottomans to take over the Balkans & Anatolia, with Constantinople falling to the Turks a century after the council.

== See also ==
- Hesychasm
- Palamism
- Fourth Council of Constantinople (Eastern Orthodox)
