= Prochoros Kydones =

Byzantine theologian (c. 1330 – c. 1369)

Prochoros Kydones (Latinized as Prochorus Cydones or Prochorus Cydonius; Greek: Πρόχορος Κυδώνης; c. 1330 – c. 1369) was an Eastern Orthodox monk, theologian, and linguist.

An advocate of Western Aristotelian thought, his translation of Latin scholastic writings brought him into conflict with Hesychasm, the leading school of Byzantine mystical theology, and its most vigorous defender, Gregory Palamas, eventually culminating in his excommunication, deposition from the priesthood, and condemnation as a heretic along with his brother Demetrios by the Synod of Constantinople.

== Life ==
Born in the Byzantine city of Thessalonica, Prochoros entered the Great Lavra, a monastery on Mount Athos at a young age, and was eventually ordained a hieromonk. He was greatly influenced by Western Scholasticism. He collaborated with his brother Demetrios Kydones in translating Thomas Aquinas' monumental Summa Theologica. Prochoros also made Greek translations of the works of Augustine of Hippo and the 6th-century philosopher Boethius.

Prochoros' own treatise, De essentia et operatione Dei (“On the Essence and Activity of God”), was a condemnation of the mystical theology of Palamism, propagated by Gregory Palamas. The Synod of Constantinople in 1368 condemned both of the brothers Kydones as heretics, and Prochoros was deposed from the priesthood. The chief source for Prochoros' life is a pair of polemical addresses by Demetrios, eulogizing his brother and denouncing Patriarch Philotheus Kokkinos, who had been responsible for their condemnation. He died at Mount Athos.

== See also ==
- Palamism
- Byzantine scholars in Renaissance
- List of Macedonians (Greek)

== Bibliography ==
- Demetracopoulos, John A. (2019). "Prochoros Kydones". In: Brungs, Alexander; Kapriev, Georgi; Mudroch, Vilem (eds). Die Philosophie des Mittelalters 1: Byzanz, Judentum [The Philosophy of the Middle Ages 1: Byzantium, Judaism]. Grundriss der Geschichte der Philosophie, new edition. Basel: Schwabe, ISBN 978-3-7965-2623-7, pp. 165-168.
