= Triads (Gregory Palamas) =

14th-century Christian text

The Triads of Gregory Palamas are a set of nine treatises entitled "Triads For The Defense of Those Who Practice Sacred Quietude" written by Gregory Palamas in response to attacks made by Barlaam. The treatises are called "Triads" because they were organized as three sets of three treatises.

== Background ==
Hesychasm attracted the attention of Barlaam, a convert to Eastern Orthodoxy, who encountered Hesychasts and heard descriptions of their practices during a visit to Mount Athos; he had also read the writings of Palamas, himself an Athonite monk. Trained in Western Scholastic theology, Barlaam was scandalized by hesychasm and began to combat it both orally and in his writings. As a private teacher of theology in the Western Scholastic mode, Barlaam propounded a more intellectual and propositional approach to the knowledge of God than the Hesychasts taught.

On the Hesychast side, the controversy was taken up by Palamas who was asked by his fellow monks on Mt Athos to defend hesychasm from the attacks of Barlaam. Palamas was well-educated in Greek philosophy. Gregory wrote a number of works in its defense and defended hesychasm at six different synods in Constantinople ultimately triumphing over its attackers in the synod of 1351.

In early 1341 Gregory drafted the Hagioritic Tome with the support of the monastic communities of Mount Athos. Although Palamas does not mention Barlaam by name, the work clearly takes aim at Barlaam's views. In response, Barlaam drafted "Against the Messalians", which attacked Gregory by name for the first time. Barlaam derisively called the Hesychasts omphalopsychoi (men with their souls in their navels) and accused them of the heresy of Messalianism, also known as Bogomilism in the East. According to Meyendorff, Barlaam viewed "any claim of real and conscious experience of God as Messalianism".

Barlaam also took exception to the doctrine held by the Hesychasts as to the uncreated nature of the light, the experience of which was said to be the goal of Hesychast practice, regarding it as heretical and blasphemous. It was maintained by the Hesychasts to be of divine origin and to be identical to the light which had been manifested to Jesus' disciples on Mount Tabor at the Transfiguration. Barlaam viewed this doctrine of "uncreated light" to be polytheistic because as it postulated two eternal substances, a visible and an invisible God. Barlaam accuses the use of the Jesus Prayer as being a practice of Bogomilism.

In contrast to Palamas' teaching that the "glory of God" revealed in various episodes of Jewish and Christian Scripture (e.g., the burning bush seen by Moses, the Light on Mount Tabor at the Transfiguration) was in fact the uncreated Energies of God (i.e., the grace of God), Barlaam held that they were created effects, because no part of God whatsoever could be directly perceived by humans. The Orthodox interpreted his position as denying the renewing power of the Holy Spirit, which, in the words of various Eastern Orthodox hymns, "made apostles out of fishermen" (i.e., makes saints even out of uneducated people). In his anti-hesychastic works Barlaam held that knowledge of worldly wisdom was necessary for the perfection of the monks and denied the possibility of the vision of the divine life.

== The Triads ==
In response to Barlaam's attacks, Palamas wrote nine treatises entitled "Triads For The Defense of Those Who Practice Sacred Quietude". The treatises are called "Triads" because they were organized as three sets of three treatises.

The Triads were written in three stages. The first triad was written in the second half of the 1330s and are based on personal discussions between Palamas and Barlaam although Barlaam is never mentioned by name.

In early 1341 Gregory drafted the Hagioritic Tome with the support of the monastic communities of Mount Athos. Although Palamas does not mention Barlaam by name, the work clearly takes aim at Barlaam's views.

In response, Barlaam drafted "Against the Messalians", which attacked Gregory by name for the first time. Barlaam derisively called the Hesychasts omphalopsychoi (men with their souls in their navels) and accused them of the heresy of Messalianism, also known as Bogomilism in the East. According to Meyendorff, Barlaam viewed "any claim of real and conscious experience of God as Messalianism".

Barlaam also took exception to the doctrine held by the Hesychasts as to the uncreated nature of the light, the experience of which was said to be the goal of Hesychast practice, regarding it as heretical and blasphemous. It was maintained by the Hesychasts to be of divine origin and to be identical to the light which had been manifested to Jesus' disciples on Mount Tabor at the Transfiguration. Barlaam viewed this doctrine of "uncreated light" to be polytheistic because as it postulated two eternal substances, a visible and an invisible God. Barlaam accuses the use of the Jesus Prayer as being a practice of Bogomilism.

In the third Triad, Palamas refuted Barlaam's charge of Messalianism by demonstrating that the Hesychasts did not share the antisacramentalism of the Messalians nor did they claim to physically see the essence of God with their eyes. According to Fr. John Meyendorff "Gregory Palamas orients his entire polemic against Barlaam the Calabrian on the issue of the Hellenic wisdom which he considers to be the main source of Barlaam’s errors."

=== Essence–Energies distinction ===
Addressing the question of how it is possible for man to have knowledge of a transcendent and unknowable God, Palamas drew a distinction between knowing God in his essence (Greek ousia) and knowing God in his "energies" (Greek energeiai). He maintained the Orthodox doctrine that it remains impossible to know God in his essence (to know who God is in and of himself), but possible to know God in his energies (to know what God does and who he is in relation to the creation and humanity), as God reveals himself to humanity. In doing so, he made reference to the Cappadocian Fathers and other earlier Christian writers and Church Fathers.

While critics of his teachings argue that this introduces an unacceptable division in the nature of God, Palamas' supporters argue that this distinction was not an innovation but had in fact been introduced in the 4th century writings of the Cappadocian Fathers. Gregory taught that the energies or operations of God were uncreated. He taught that the essence of God can never be known by his creature even in the next life, but that his uncreated energies or operations can be known both in this life and in the next, and convey to the Hesychast in this life and to the righteous in the next life a true spiritual knowledge of God. In Palamite theology, it is the uncreated energies of God that illumine the Hesychast who has been vouchsafed an experience of the Uncreated Light.

=== Tabor Light ===
Gregory further asserted that when Peter, James and John witnessed the Transfiguration of Jesus on Mount Tabor, that they were in fact seeing the uncreated light of God; and that it is possible for others to be granted to see that same uncreated light of God with the help of certain spiritual disciplines and contemplative prayer, although not in any automatic or mechanistic fashion.

== See also ==
- Pseudo-Dionysius the Areopagite
- Demetrios Kydones

== Bibliography ==
- Vladimir Lossky The Mystical Theology of the Eastern Church, SVS Press, 1997. (ISBN 0-913836-31-1) James Clarke & Co Ltd, 1991. (ISBN 0-227-67919-9)Copy online
- David Bradshaw Aristotle East and West: Metaphysics and the Division of Christendom Cambridge University Press, 2004 ISBN 0-521-82865-1, ISBN 978-0-521-82865-9
- Anstall, Kharalambos (2007). "Juridical Justification Theology and a Statement of the Orthodox Teaching," Stricken by God? Nonviolent Identification and the Victory of Christ". Grand Rapids, MI: Eerdmans.
- Gross, Jules (2003). The Divinization of the Christian According to the Greek Fathers. A & C Press. ISBN 978-0-7363-1600-2.
