= Gregory Akindynos =

Byzantine theologian (c.1300–c.1348)

Gregory Akindynos (Latinized as Gregorius Acindynus; Greek: Γρηγόριος Ἀκίνδυνος; c. 1300 – 1348) was a Byzantine theologian of Bulgarian origin. A native of Prilep, he moved from Pelagonia to Thessaloniki and studied under Thomas Magistros and Gregory Bryennios. He became an admirer of Nikephoros Gregoras after he was shown an astronomical treatise of that scholar by his friend Balsamon in 1332, writing him a letter in which he calls him a "sea of wisdom". From Thessaloniki, he intended to move on to Mount Athos, but for reasons unknown, he was refused.

He was involved in the theological dispute surrounding the doctrine of Uncreated Light between Gregory Palamas and Barlaam of Calabria in the 1340s. As a student of Palamas', he mediated between the two from 1337, warning Barlaam in 1340 that his attempts against his doctrine would be futile, but from 1341 he became critical of Palamas' position, denouncing it as Messalianism, and came to be Palamas' most dangerous adversary after Barlaam's return to Calabria. He was excommunicated at the Council of Constantinople of 1347 and died in exile, apparently a victim of the plague of 1348.

== See also ==
- Essence–energies distinction
- Hesychasm

== Literature ==
- Patrologia Graeca vol. 151.
- Angela Constantinides Hero (trans.), Letters of Gregory Akindynos, Harvard Univ Press (1983), ISBN 0-88402-107-6. review: Aristeides Papadakis, Speculum (1985).
- J.-S. Nadal, "La critique par Akindynos de l'herméneutique patristique de Palamas," Istina 19 (1974), 297–328.
- J. Nadal Cañellas, ed. Gregorii Acindyni refutationes duae operis Gregorii Palamae cui titulus Dialogus inter Orthodoxum et Barlaamitam (Louvain 1995). [= Corpus Christianorum Series Graeca, 31.] (Greek text of Acindynus' treatises against a work by Palamas titled Dialogue between an Orthodox and a Barlaamite.)
- J. Nadal Cañellas, La résistance d' Akindynos à Grégoire Palamas. Enquête historique, avec traduction et commentaire de quatre traités édités récemment. I-II (Louvain 2003) [= Spicilegium Sacrum Lovaniense. Études et documents 50 - 51]. (Gives a French translation, with important historical commentary, of the treatises edited by Nadal Cañellas in 1995.)
- Juan Nadal Canellas, "Le rôle de Grégoire Akindynos dans la controverse hésychaste du XIVeme siècle à Byzance," in Juan Pedro Monferrer-Sala (ed.), Eastern Crossroads: Essays on Medieval Christian Legacy (Piscataway: Gorgias Press LLC, 2007) (Gorgias Eastern Christian Studies, 1), 31–60. (For an English translation of this, see: Gregory Akindynos’s role in the 14th-century hesychast controversy.)
- Anna Tryphonos, Ο Γρηγόριος Ακίνδυνος μέσα από τις επιστολές του [Gregory Akindynos through his letters; dissertation] (Athens, 2012).
