= Mystical theology =

Branch of theology that explains mystical practices and states

Mystical theology is the branch of theology in the Christian tradition that deals with divine encounter and the self-communication of God with the faithful; such as to explain mystical practices and states, as induced by contemplative practices such as contemplative prayer, called theoria from the Greek for contemplation.

It can be contrasted to an extent with propositional theology e.g., systematic theology, dogmatic theology, scholastic theology, ecclesiology or treated as their forerunner: its subject and aim is not knowledge but divine encounter.

== Early Christianity ==
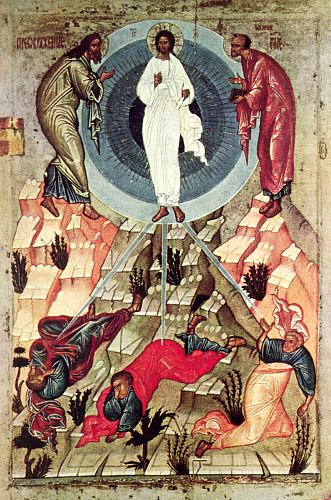
Icon of the Transfiguration

=== Early Alexandrian tradition ===
According to Origen (184/185–253/254AD) and the Alexandrian theology, theoria is the knowledge of God in creation and of sensible things, and thus their contemplation intellectually (150–400AD) (see Clement of Alexandria, and Evagrius Ponticus). This knowledge and contemplation leads to communion with God akin to Divine Providence.

=== St. Macarius of Egypt ===
In the theological tradition of Macarius of Egypt (ca. 300–391AD) and Pseudo-Macarius, theoria is the point of interaction between God and the human in the heart of the person, manifesting spiritual gifts to the human heart.

The highest form of contemplation originates in the heart (see agape), a higher form of contemplation than that of the intellect. The concept that theoria is allotted to each unique individual by their capacity to comprehend God is consistent. This is also the tradition of theoria, as taught by St. Symeon the New Theologian (949–1022AD), that one cannot be a theologian unless one sees the hypostases of God or the uncreated light. This experience cultivates humility, meekness and the love of the human race that the Triune God has created. This invisible fire in the heart for humanity is manifest in absolute kindness and love for one's neighbor akin to selfless humility, agape or love, growing from mortification, kenosis, or epiclesis. This agape, or holy fire, is the essence of Orthodoxy.

=== Cappadocian tradition ===
In the Cappadocian school of thought (Saint Basil, Saint Gregory of Nyssa, and Saint Gregory Nazianzus) (350–400AD), theoria is the experience of the highest or absolute truth, realized by complete union with God. It is entering the 'Cloud of Unknowing', which is beyond rational understanding, and can be embraced only in love of God (Agape or Awe). The Cappadocian fathers went beyond the intellectual contemplation of the Alexandrian fathers. This was to begin with the seminal work Philokalia, which, through hesychasm, leads to Phronema and finally theosis, which is validated by theoria. One must move beyond gnosis to faith (meta-gnosis). Through ignorance, one moves beyond knowledge and being, this contemplation being theoria. In this tradition, theoria means understanding that the Uncreated cannot be grasped by the logical or rational mind, but only by the whole person (unity of heart and mind); this perception is that of the nous. God was knowable in his manifestations, but ultimately, one must transcend knowledge or gnosis, since knowledge is based on reflection, and because gnosis is limited and can become a barrier between man and God (as an idolatry). If one wishes to commune with God, one must enter into the Divine filial relation with God the Father through Jesus Christ, one in ousia with the Father, which results in pure faith without any preconceived notions of God. At this point, one can commune with God just as Moses did. Gregory of Nyssa presented as the culmination of the Christian religion the contemplation of the divine Being and its eternal Will.

=== Pseudo-Dionysius the Areopagite's apophaticism ===
Pseudo-Dionysius the Areopagite (5th to early 6th century; writing before 532), himself influenced by the Neoplatonic philosopher Proclus, had a strong impact on Christian thought and practice, both east and west. Theoria is the main theme of Dionysius’ work called "The Mystical Theology". In chapter 1, Dionysius says that God dwells in divine darkness i.e. God is unknowable through sense and reason. Therefore, a person must leave behind the activity of sense and reason and enter into spiritual union with God. Through spiritual union with God (theosis), the mystic is granted theoria and through this vision is ultimately given knowledge of God. In the tradition of Dionysus the Areopagite, theoria is the lifting up of the individual out of time, space and created being, while the Triune God reaches down, or descends, to the hesychast. This process is also known as ekstasis ("mystical ecstasy").

While theoria is possible through prayer, it is attained in a perfect way through the Eucharist. Perfect vision of the deity, perceptible in its uncreated light, is the "mystery of the eighth day". The eighth day is the day of the Eucharist but it also has an eschatological dimension as it is the day outside of the week i.e. beyond time. It is the start of a new eon in human history. Through the Eucharist people experience the eternity of God who transcends time and space.

The Dionysian writings and their mystical teaching were universally accepted throughout the East, amongst both Chalcedonians and non-Chalcedonians. St. Gregory Palamas, for example, in referring to these writings, calls the author, "an unerring beholder of divine things".

In western Christianity Dionysius's "via negativa" was particularly influential in the fourteenth and fifteenth centuries, on western mystics such as Marguerite Porete, Meister Eckhart, John Tauler, Jan van Ruusbroec, the author of The Cloud of Unknowing (who made an expanded Middle English translation of Dionysius' Mystical Theology), Jean Gerson, Nicholas of Cusa, Denys the Carthusian, Julian of Norwich and Harphius Herp. His influence can also be traced in the Spanish Carmelite thought of the sixteenth century among Teresa of Avila and John of the Cross.

== Eastern Orthodox Church ==
=== Symeon the New Theologian ===
Symeon the New Theologian (sometimes spelled "Simeon") (Greek: Συμεὼν ὁ Νέος Θεολόγος; 949–1022 AD) was a Byzantine Christian monk and poet who was the last of three saints canonized by the Eastern Orthodox church and given the title of "Theologian" (along with John the Apostle and Gregory of Nazianzus). "Theologian" was not applied to Symeon in the modern academic sense of theological study; the title was designed only to recognize someone who spoke from personal experience of the vision of God. One of his principal teachings was that humans could and should experience theoria (literally "contemplation," or direct experience of God).

Symeon repeatedly describes the experience of divine light in his writings, as both an inward and outward mystical experience. These experiences began in his youth, and continued all during his life. They came to him during inward prayer and contemplation, and were associated with a feeling of indescribable joy, as well as the intellectual understanding that the light was a vision of God. In his writings, he spoke directly to God about the experience variously as "the pure Light of your face" and "You deigned to reveal Your face to me like a formless sun." He also described the light as the grace of God, and taught that its experience was associated with a mind that was completely still and had transcended itself. At times he described the light speaking to him with kindness, and explaining who it was.

A central theme throughout Symeon's teachings and writings is that all Christians should aspire to have actual direct experience of God in deep contemplation, or theoria. Regarding his own mystical experiences, he presented them not as unique to himself, but as the norm for all Christians. He taught that the experience came after purification through prayer, repentance, and asceticism. He especially called on his monks to take on the traditional charismatic and prophetic role in the Church.

In his writings, Symeon emphasized the power of the Holy Spirit to transform, and the profound mystical union with God that is the result of a holy life. Symeon referred to this as the Baptism of the Holy Spirit, compared to the more ritualistic Baptism of water. Symeon believed that Christianity had descended into formulae and church ritual, which for many people replaced the earlier emphasis on actual and direct experience of God. The Discourses express Symeon's strong conviction that the life of a Christian must be much more than mere observance of rules, and must include personal experience of the presence of the living Christ. Symeon describes his own conversion and mystical experience of the divine light.

=== Palamism and the Hesychast controversy ===
Under St. Gregory Palamas (1296–1359AD), the different traditions of theoria were synthesized into an understanding of theoria that, through baptism, one receives the Holy Spirit. Through participation in the sacraments of the Church and the performance of works of faith, one cultivates a relationship with God. If one then, through willful submission to God, is devotional and becomes humble, akin to the Theotokos and the saints, and proceeds in faith past the point of rational contemplation, one can experience God. Palamas stated that this is not a mechanized process because each person is unique, but that the apodictic way that one experiences the uncreated light, or God, is through contemplative prayer called hesychasm. Theoria is cultivated through each of the steps of the growing process of theosis.

Gregory was initially asked by his fellow monks on Mount Athos to defend them from the charges of Barlaam of Calabria. Barlaam believed that philosophers had a greater knowledge of God than did the prophets, and valued education and learning more than contemplative prayer. Palamas taught that the truth is a person, Jesus Christ, a form of objective reality. In order for a Christian to be authentic, he or she must experience the Truth (i.e. Christ) as a real person (see hypostasis). Gregory further asserted that when Peter, James and John witnessed the transfiguration of Jesus on Mount Tabor, they were seeing the uncreated light of God, and that it is possible for others to be granted to see it, using spiritual disciplines (ascetic practices) and contemplative prayer.

The only true way to experience Christ, according to Palamas, was the Eastern Orthodox faith. Once a person discovers Christ (through the Orthodox church), they begin the process of theosis, which is the gradual submission to the Truth (i.e. God) in order to be deified (theosis). Theoria is seen to be the experience of God hypostatically in person. However, since the essence of God is unknowable, it also cannot be experienced. Palamas expressed theoria as an experience of God as it happens to the whole person (soul or nous), not just the mind or body, in contrast to an experience of God that is drawn from memory, the mind, or in time. Gnosis and all knowledge are created, as they are derived or created from experience, self-awareness and spiritual knowledge. Theoria, here, is the experience of the uncreated in various degrees, i.e. the vision of God or to see God. The experience of God in the eighth day or outside of time therefore transcends the self and experiential knowledge or gnosis. Gnosis is most importantly understood as a knowledge of oneself; theoria is the experience of God, transcending the knowledge of oneself. (Note: Ecstasy comes when, in prayer, the nous abandons every connection with created things: first "with everything evil and bad, then with neutral things" (2,3,35;CWS p.65). Ecstasy is mainly withdrawal from the opinion of the world and the flesh. With sincere prayer the nous "abandons all created things" (2,3,35;CWS p.65). This ecstasy is higher than abstract theology, that is, than rational theology, and it belongs only to those who have attained dispassion. It is not yet union; the ecstasy which is unceasing prayer of the nous, in which one's nous has continuous remembrance of God and has no relation with the `world of sin', is not yet union with God. This union comes about when the Paraclete "...illuminates from on high the man who attains in prayer the stage which is superior to the highest natural possibilities and who is awaiting the promise of the Father, and by His revelation ravishes him to the contemplation of the light" (2,3,35;CWS p.65). Illumination by God is what shows His union with man. (GK: apathea) and clarity of vision. Vision here refers to the vision of the nous that has been purified by ascetic practice.) St. Gregory Palamas died on November 14, 1359; his last words were, "To the heights! To the heights!" He is commemorated on the Second Sunday of Great Lent because Gregory's victory over Barlaam is seen as a continuation of the Triumph of Orthodoxy, i.e., the victory of the Church over heresy.

=== John Romanides ===
John Romanides (1927-2001) was an Orthodox Christian priest, author and professor. According to Kalaitzidis, Romanides had a strong influence on contemporary Greek Orthodoxy, to such an extent that some speak about "pre- and post-Romanidian theology."

According to Romanides, Eastern and Western Christianity diverged due to the influences of the Franks, who were culturally very different from the Romans. (Note: See also: Ramonides, FRANKS, ROMANS, FEUDALISM, AND DOCTRINE.) Romanides belonged to the "theological generation of the 1960s," which pleaded for a "return to the Fathers," and led to "the acute polarization of the East-West divide and the cultivation of an anti-Western, anti-eucumenical sentiment."

His theological works emphasize the empirical (experiential) (Note: Metropolitan Hierotheos Vlachos: "The vision of the uncreated light, which offers knowledge of God to man, is sensory and supra-sensory. The bodily eyes are reshaped, so they see the uncreated light, "this mysterious light, inaccessible, immaterial, uncreated, deifying, eternal", this "radiance of the Divine Nature, this glory of the divinity, this beauty of the heavenly kingdom" (3,1,22;CWS p.80). Palamas asks: "Do you see that light is inaccessible to senses which are not transformed by the Spirit?" (2,3,22). St. Maximus, whose teaching is cited by St. Gregory, says that the Apostles saw the uncreated Light "by a transformation of the activity of their senses, produced in them by the Spirit" (2.3.22).) basis of theology called theoria or vision of God, (as opposed to a rational or reasoned understanding of theory) as the essence of Orthodox theology, setting it "apart from all other religions and traditions," especially the Frankish-dominated western Church which distorted this true spiritual path. He identified hesychasm as the core of Christian practice and studied extensively the works of 14th-century Byzantine theologian St. Gregory Palamas.

== Roman Catholic Church ==
=== Possibility of contemplation ===
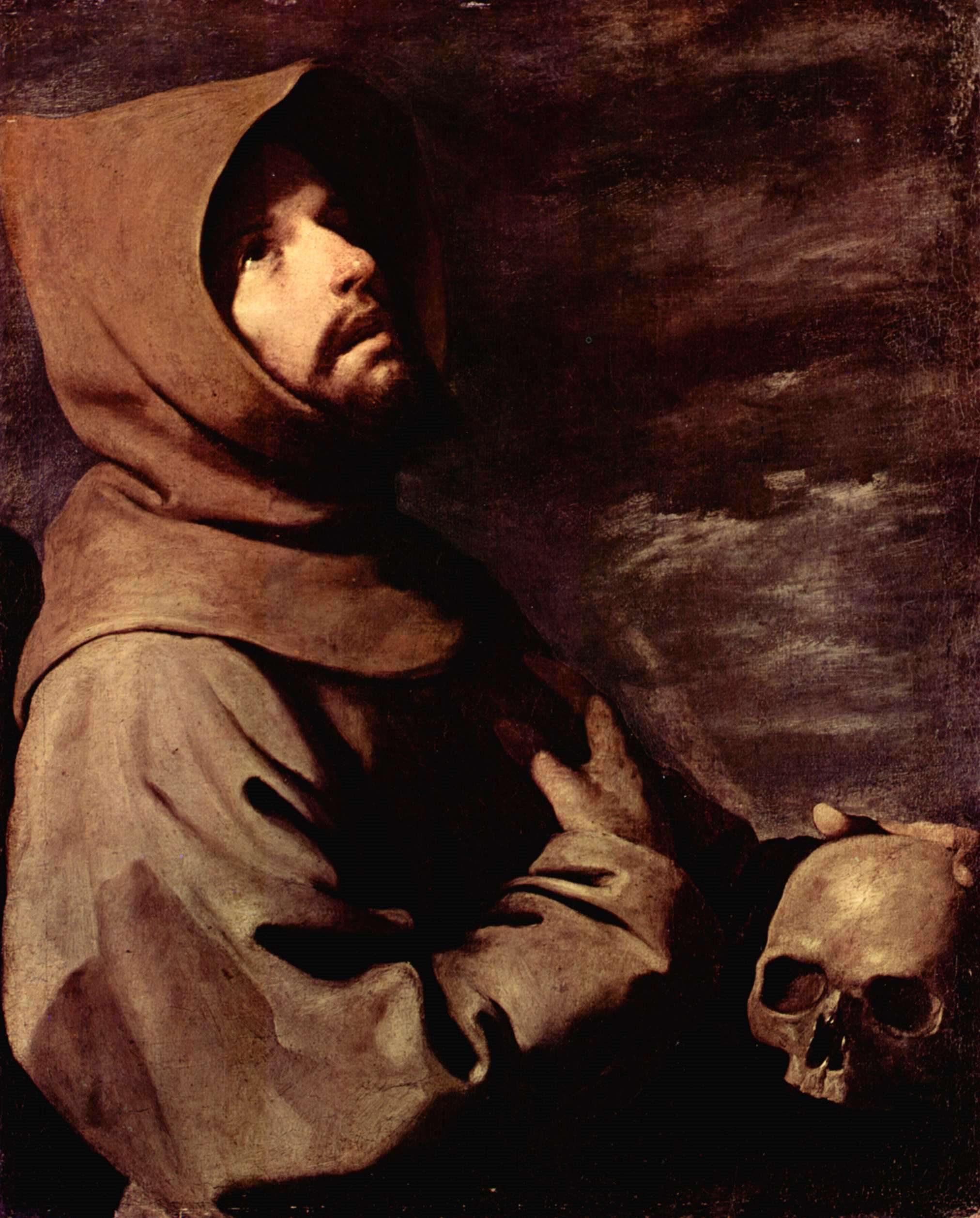
Saint Francis of Assisi

According to Saint Gregory the Great there are people by whom, "while still living in this corruptible flesh, yet growing in incalculable power by a certain piercingness of contemplation, the Eternal Brightness is able to be seen."

While the direct vision of God (the Beatific Vision) can be reached only in the next life, God does give to some a very special grace, by which he becomes intimately present to the created mind even before death, enabling it to contemplate him with ineffable joy and be mystically united with him even while still alive, true mystical contemplation. Saint Augustine said that, in contemplation, man meets God face-to-face.

Inasmuch as the goal of the Christian life is the vision of God in heaven, Augustine and others maintain that the "contemplative life" is the eschatological goal of all Christians, the fruit and reward of the entire Christian life. "Contemplation" on earth can thus be seen as a foretaste of heaven.

Contemplative prayer is not the reserve of some elite: "rather it is that interior intimacy with God which is intended for all baptized people, to which Jesus wants to lead all his disciples, because it is his own intimacy with the Father".

The Catechism of the Catholic Church describes contemplation as "a gaze of faith, fixed on Jesus. 'I look at him and he looks at me': this is what a certain peasant of Ars used to say to his holy curé about his prayer before the tabernacle. This focus on Jesus is a renunciation of self. His gaze purifies our heart; the light of the countenance of Jesus illumines the eyes of our heart and teaches us to see everything in the light of his truth and his compassion for all men. Contemplation also turns its gaze on the mysteries of the life of Christ. Thus it learns the 'interior knowledge of our Lord', the more to love him and follow him."

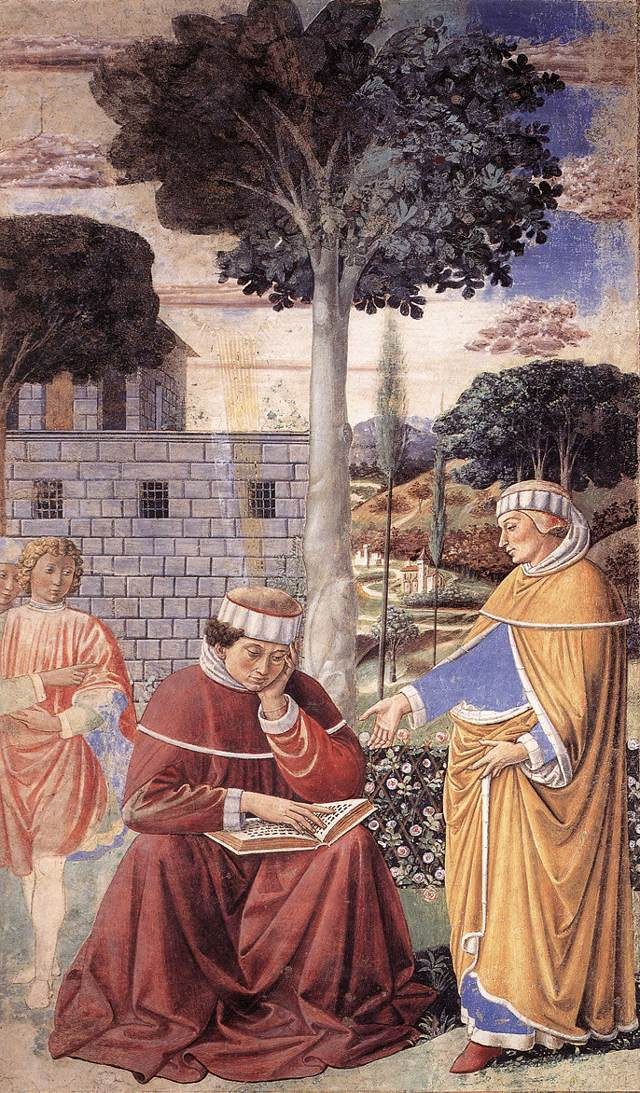
Saint Augustine

Contemplative prayer is "a communion in which the Holy Trinity conforms man, the image of God, 'to his likeness'" and in it "the Father strengthens our inner being with power through his Spirit 'that Christ may dwell in (our) hearts through faith' and we may be 'grounded in love' (Ephesians 3:16–17)."

Saint John Cassian the Roman, whose writings influenced the whole of Western monasticism, interpreted the Gospel episode of Martha and Mary as indicating that Jesus declared "the chief good to reside in theoria alone – that is, in divine contemplation", which is initiated by reflecting on a few holy persons and advances to being fed on the beauty and knowledge of God alone.

Saint Augustine has been cited as proving magnificently that man can only find God in the depths of his own soul: "Too late loved I Thee, O Beauty so old, yet ever new! Too late loved I Thee. And behold, Thou wert within, and I abroad, and there I searched for Thee. Thou wert with me, but I was not with Thee." The Dismissal Hymn sung in the Byzantine Rite feast of Saint Augustine, 15 June, describes him as "a wise hierarch who has received God":

O blessed Augustine, you have been proved to be a bright vessel of the divine Spirit and revealer of the city of God; you have also righteously served the Saviour as a wise hierarch who has received God. O righteous father, pray to Christ God that he may grant to us great mercy.

He is celebrated not only as a contemplative but also as a theologian and Father of the Church, a title given to him in a document of the Fifth Ecumenical Council, held in Constantinople in 553, which declared that it followed his teaching on the true faith "in every way". Another document of the same ecumenical council speaks of Augustine as "of most religious memory, who shone forth resplendent among the African bishops".

Contemplation may sometimes reach a level that has been described as religious ecstasy, and non-essential phenomena, such as visions and stigmata, may sometimes though very rarely accompany it.

=== Contemplation and rational knowledge ===
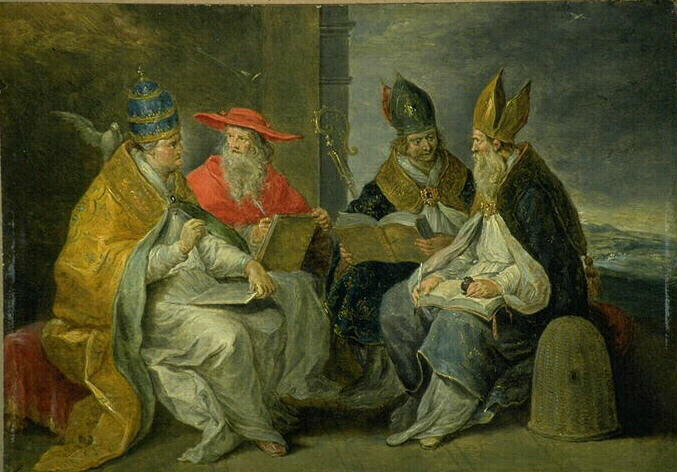
Four saints, doctors of the Church

The writings attributed to Saint Dionysius the Areopagite were highly influential in the West, and their theses and arguments were adopted by Peter Lombard, Alexander of Hales, Saint Albert the Great, Saint Thomas Aquinas and Saint Bonaventure. According to these writings, mystical knowledge must be distinguished from the rational knowledge by which we know God, not in his nature, but through the wonderful order of the universe, which is a participation in the divine ideas. Through the more perfect mystical knowledge of God, a knowledge beyond the attainments of reason (even when enlightened by faith), the soul contemplates directly the mysteries of divine light.

Theoria or contemplation of God is of far higher value than reasoning about God or speculative theology, its illumination prized much more than the intellectual capacity of a theologian. "Prayer cannot be reduced to the level of a means to improved understanding". Instead, contemplation is "the normal perfection of theology".

The rational exposition and explanation of Christian doctrine is the humbler task of the theologian, while the experience of contemplatives is often of a more lofty level, beyond the power of human words to express, so that "they have had to resort to metaphors, similes, and symbols to convey the inexpressible."

According to Aquinas, there are some properties of God that theology can only focus on by dealing with what God is not: immutability, timelessness, simple. Pseudo-Dionysias recommends a kind of mysticism which, instead of trying to comprehend what God is, is able to intuit it: for both Aquinas and Pseudo-Dionysius, there is another class of statement about God, the analogical, which focuses on characteristics that can be said of both humans and God: good, powerful, loving, etc. (indeed over-good, pre-being, etc.)

== Notes ==
Subnotes

== Sources ==
- Poulain, Augustin (1912), "Mystical Theology", The Catholic Encyclopedia
- Kalaitzidis, Pantelis (2013), "The Image of the West in Contemporary Greek Theology", in Demacopoulos, George E.; Papanikolaou, Aristotle (eds.), Orthodox Constructions of the West, Oxford University Press
- Louth, Andrew (2015), Modern Orthodox Thinkers: From the Philokalia to the Present, InterVarsity Press
- Metropolitan Hierotheos Vlachos (2005), "The Knowledge of God according to St. Gregory Palamas", Orthodox Psychotherapy, Birth of Theotokos Monastery, Greece, ISBN 978-960-7070-27-2
