= Byzantine philosophy =

Philosophy of the Byzantine Empire

Byzantine philosophy refers to the distinctive philosophical ideas of the philosophers and scholars of the Byzantine Empire, especially between the 8th and 15th centuries. It was characterised by a Christian world-view, closely linked to Eastern Orthodox theology, but drawing ideas directly from the Greek texts of Plato, Aristotle, and the Neoplatonists.

== History ==
Greek science and literature remained alive in the Byzantine world, and Byzantine philosophy drew heavily on Plato, Aristotle, and the Neoplatonists, even if it was now Christian in tone. In the 7th century, John of Damascus produced a three-part encyclopedia containing in its third part a systematic exposition of Christian theology. In the 9th century Photios, the Patriarch of Constantinople, collected many works by ancient writers, and studied Aristotelian logic, and his pupil Arethas commentated on works by Plato and Aristotle. By the 11th and 12th centuries there was a growing interest in the teaching of philosophy, and figures such as Michael Psellos, Eustratius of Nicaea, and Michael of Ephesus wrote commentaries on Aristotle. In the 13th and 14th centuries we have important philosophers such as Nicephorus Blemmydes and Theodore Metochites. An important figure was Gregory Palamas who defended the mystical movement known as Hesychasm, which involved the use of the noetic Jesus prayer to achieve a vision of the uncreated Light also called the Illumination or Vision of God. It was the Hesychast movement that caused a rift in the Christian East which led many philosophically minded individuals to go West. This migration played a critical role in the manifestation of the Renaissance in the West. Especially the role of Barlaam of Calabria, who opposed Hesychasm, played in the formation of Roman Catholic theology in the West. The last great philosopher of Byzantium was Gemistus Pletho who felt that a restored Platonism could reverse the decline of the Empire. He was an important figure in the transmission of ancient philosophy to the West.

== University of Constantinople ==
Byzantine society was well educated by the standards of its time, with high levels of literacy compared to the rest of the world. Significantly it possessed a secular education system that was a continuation of the academies of classical antiquity. Primary education was widely available, even at the village level. Uniquely in that society education was available for both sexes. It was in this context that the secular University of Constantinople can be understood. Further still secular education was common, to a degree, in the empire. As for many centuries, before the Muslim conquest, similar institutions operated in such major provincial capitals as Antioch and Alexandria.

The original school was founded in 425 by Emperor Theodosius II with 31 chairs for Law, Philosophy, Medicine, Arithmetic, Geometry, Astronomy, Music, Rhetoric and other subjects, 15 to Latin and 16 to Greek. The university existed until the 15th century.

The main content of higher education for most students was rhetoric, philosophy and law. With the aim of producing competent, and learned personnel to staff the bureaucratic postings of state and church. In this sense the university was the secular equivalent of the Theological Schools. The university maintained an active philosophical tradition based on Platonism and Aristotelianism, with the former being the longest unbroken Platonic school, running for close to two millennia until the 15th century.

The School of Magnaura was founded in the 9th century and in the 11th new schools of philosophy and law were established at the Capitol School. The period of decline begun with the Latin conquest of 1204 although the university survived as a non-secular institution under Church management until the Fall of Constantinople.

== Issues and ideas ==
The principal characteristics of Byzantine philosophy are:

1. The personal hypostases of God as the principle not only of substance but also of being (Ontology, Metaphysics). Person as ontological rather than substance or essence.
2. The creation of the world by God and the limited timescale of the universe
3. The continuous process of creation and the purpose behind it
4. The perceptible world as the realization in time of that which is perceptible to the mind, having its eternal hypostasis in the divine intellect (nous)

The world and humanity are subject to divine providence, but the Byzantine philosophers asserted the need for free will and self-determination. The soul as immortal is uncreated in its energies but created in itself. Soul is body plus spirit, and directly connects with the intellect to enable the achievement of happiness by means of the freedom of decision. The relationship between God and human beings is based on love, which explains the central place of humans in creation.

=== Neoplatonism ===
The relationship between the mystic, religious understanding of God and a philosophical one has various stages of development in the history of the Roman East. The nous as mind in Byzantine philosophy is given the central role of understanding only when it is placed or reconciled with the heart or soul of the person. The soul being the whole unit of man the mind as rational and noetic being an integral part of man's soul. Earlier versions of Christian and Greek philosophical syncretism are in modern times referred to as Neoplatonic. An example of this can be seen in the works of Origen and his teaching on the nous as to Origen, all souls pre-existed with their Creator in a perfect, spiritual (non-material) state as "minds" or nous, but later fell away in order to pursue an existence independent of God. Since all souls were created absolutely free, God could not simply force them to return to Him (this was, according to Origen, due to God's boundless love and respect for His creatures). Instead, God created the material cosmos, and initiated history, for the purpose of guiding the wayward souls back to contemplation of His infinite mind, which is, according to Origen, the perfect state.

== See also ==
- Byzantine literature
- Byzantine science
- Corpus Scriptorum Historiae Byzantinae
- Eastern Orthodox theology
- Greek scholars in the Renaissance
- Halki seminary
- Medieval Greek
- Russian philosophy
- Western philosophy
