= Essence–energies distinction =

Theological concept central to Eastern Orthodoxy

In Eastern Orthodox (Palamite) theology, there is a distinction between the essence (ousia) and the energies (energeia) of God. It was formulated by Gregory Palamas (1296–1359) as part of his defense of the Athonite monastic practice of Hesychasm (Note: The mystical exercise of "stillness" to facilitate ceaseless inner prayer and noetic contemplation of God.) against the charge of heresy brought by the humanist scholar and theologian Barlaam of Calabria.

Eastern Orthodox theologians generally regard this distinction as a real distinction, and not just a conceptual distinction. Historically, Western Christian thought, since the time of the Great Schism, has tended to reject the essence–energies distinction as real in the case of God, characterizing the view as a heretical introduction of an unacceptable division in the Trinity and suggestive of polytheism.

== Historical background ==
The essence–energy distinction was formulated by Gregory Palamas of Thessaloniki (1296–1359), as part of his defense of the Athonite monastic practice of hesychasmos, the mystical exercise of "stillness" to facilitate ceaseless inner prayer and noetic contemplation of God, against the charge of heresy brought by the humanist scholar and theologian Barlaam of Calabria.

The mystagogical teachings of hesychasm were approved in the Eastern Orthodox Church by a series of local Hesychast councils in the 14th century, and Gregory's commemoration during the liturgical season of Great Lent is seen as an extension of the Sunday of Orthodoxy.

== Eastern Orthodox views ==
=== Essence and energy ===
In Eastern Orthodox theology God's essence is called ousia, "all that subsists by itself and which has not its being in another", and is distinct from his energies (energeia in Greek, actus in Latin) or activities as actualized in the world.

The ousia of God is God as God is. The essence, being, nature and substance of God as taught in Eastern Christianity is uncreated, and cannot be comprehended in words. According to Lossky, God's ousia is "that which finds no existence or subsistence in another or any other thing". God's ousia has no necessity or subsistence that needs or is dependent on anything other than itself.

It is the energies of God that enable us to experience something of the Divine, at first through sensory perception and then later intuitively or noetically. As St John Damascene states in Chapter 4 of An Exact Exposition of the Orthodox Faith, "all that we say positively of God manifests not his nature but the things about his nature."

=== Type of distinction ===
==== Real distinction ====
According to Fr. John Romanides, Palamas considers the distinction between God's essence and his energies to be a "real distinction", as distinguished from the Thomistic "virtual distinction" and the Scotist "formal distinction". Romanides suspects that Barlaam accepted a "formal distinction" between God's essence and his energies. Other writers agree that Palamas views the distinction between the divine essence and the divine energies as "real".

According to Vladimir Lossky of the neopatristic school, if we deny the real distinction between essence and energy, we cannot fix any clear borderline between the procession of the divine persons (as existences and/or realities of God) and the creation of the world: both the one and the other will be equally acts of the divine nature (strictly uncreated from uncreated). The being and the action(s) of God then would appear identical, leading to the teaching of pantheism.

==== Modern interpretation ====
Some contemporary scholars argue against describing Palamas's essence–energies distinction in God as a metaphysically "real" distinction. Orthodox philosophical theologian David Bentley Hart expresses doubt "that Palamas ever intended to suggest a real distinction between God's essence and energies." G. Philips argues that Palamas's distinction is not an "ontological" distinction but, rather, analogous to a "formal distinction" in the Scotist sense of the term. According to Dominican Catholic theological historian Fr. Aidan Nichols, Palamas's essence–energies distinction is "not simply by virtue of his saving action ab extra, much less as a merely 'formal' distinction, something demanded by the limited operating capacities of human minds."

According to Anna N. Williams's study of Palamas, which is more recent than the assessments of Hart and Philips, in only two passages does Palamas state explicitly that God's energies are "as constitutively and ontologically distinct from the essence as are the three Hypostases," and in one place he makes explicit his view, repeatedly implied elsewhere, that the essence and the energies are not the same; but Williams contends that not even in these passages did Palamas intend to argue for an "ontological or fully real distinction," and that the interpretation of his teaching by certain polemical modern disciples of his is false.

=== Eastern Orthodox criticism of Western theology ===
Eastern Orthodox theologians have criticized Western theology, especially the traditional scholastic claim that God is actus purus, for its alleged incompatibility with the essence–energies distinction. Christos Yannaras writes, "The West confuses God's essence with his energy, regarding the energy as a property of the divine essence and interpreting the latter as "pure energy" (actus purus)" According to George C. Papademetriou, the essence–energies distinction "is contrary to the Western confusion of the uncreated essence with the uncreated energies and this is by the claim that God is Actus Purus".

== Catholic perspectives ==
The Catholic Church distinguishes between doctrine, which is single and must be accepted by Catholics, and theological elaborations of doctrine, about which Catholics may legitimately disagree. With respect to the Eastern and Western theological traditions, the Catholic Church recognizes that, at times, one tradition may "come nearer to a full appreciation of some aspects of a mystery of revelation than the other, or [express] it to better advantage." In these situations, the Church views the various theological expressions "often as mutually complementary rather than conflicting."

According to Meyendorff, from Palamas's time until the twentieth century, Roman Catholic theologians generally rejected the idea that there is in God a real essence–energies distinction. In their view, a real distinction between the essence and the energies of God contradicted the teaching of the First Council of Nicaea on divine unity. Catholic theologian Ludwig Ott held that an absence of real distinction between the attributes of God and God's essence is a dogma of the Catholic Church.

In contrast, Jürgen Kuhlmann argues that the Catholic Church never judged Palamism to be heretical, adding that Palamas did not consider that the distinction between essence and energies in God made God composite. According to Kuhlmann, "the denial of a real distinction between essence and energies is not an article of Catholic faith".

According to Meyendorff, the later twentieth century saw a change in the attitude of Roman Catholic theologians to Palamas, a "rehabilitation" of him that has led to increasing parts of the Western Church considering him a saint, even if uncanonized. Some Western scholars maintain that there is no conflict between the teaching of Palamas and Catholic thought on the distinction. According to G. Philips, the essence–energies distinction of Palamas is "a typical example of a perfectly admissible theological pluralism" that is compatible with the Roman Catholic magisterium. Jeffrey D. Finch claims that "the future of East-West rapprochement appears to be overcoming the modern polemics of neo-scholasticism and neo-Palamism". Some Western theologians have incorporated the essence–energies distinction into their own thinking.

== See also ==
Orthodox theology

- Deification (theosis) and synergy
- Uncreated Light
- Cappadocian Fathers
- Pseudo-Dionysius the Areopagite
- Byzantine philosophy
- Pavel Florensky

Neo-Palamism

- Vladimir Lossky
- Sophrony (Sakharov)
- John Meyendorff

Western philosophy

- Plethon
- Noumenon

Asia

- Attributes of God in Islam
- Bhedabheda
- Essence-Function
- Brahman and Ātman division
- Shakti

Judaism

- Atzmus
- Ein Sof
- Ohr and Sefirot

== Bibliography ==
- Athanasopoulos, Constantinos; Schneider, Christoph, eds. (2013). Divine Essence and Divine Energies: Ecumenical Reflections on the Presence of God. Cambridge, UK: James Clarke & Co. ISBN 9780227900086.
- Vladimir Lossky The Mystical Theology of the Eastern Church, SVS Press, 1997. (ISBN 0-913836-31-1) James Clarke & Co. Ltd., 1991. (ISBN 0-227-67919-9) Google books
- David Bradshaw Aristotle East and West: Metaphysics and the Division of Christendom Cambridge University Press, 2004 ISBN 0-521-82865-1, ISBN 978-0-521-82865-9 Google books
