= Eastern Orthodox theology =

Eastern Orthodox theology is the theology particular to the Eastern Orthodox Church. It is characterized by monotheistic Trinitarianism, belief in the Incarnation of the divine Logos or only-begotten Son of God, cataphatic theology with apophatic theology, a hermeneutic defined by a sacred Tradition, a catholic ecclesiology, a theology of the person, and a principally recapitulative and therapeutic soteriology.

== Holy tradition ==
=== Ecclesiology ===
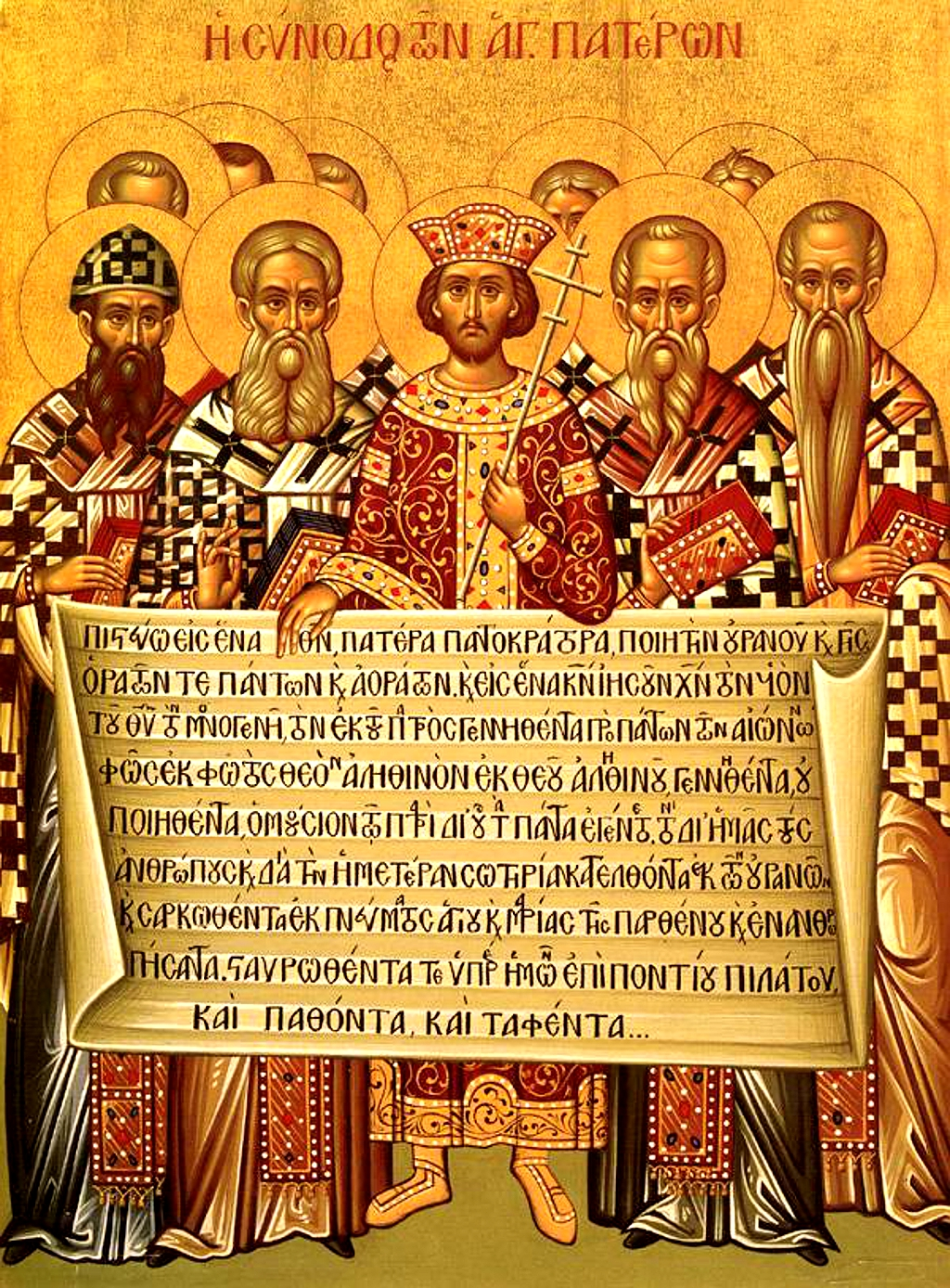
Icon depicting Constantine the Great, accompanied by the bishops of the First Council of Nicaea (325), holding the Niceno-Constantinopolitan Creed of 381. First line of main text in Greek: Πιστεύω εἰς ἕνα Θ[εό]ν, πατέρα παντοκράτορα, ποιητὴν οὐρανοῦ κ[αὶ] γῆς,. Translation: "I believe in one God, the Father the Almighty, Maker of heaven and earth."

The Eastern Orthodox Church considers itself to be the one, holy, catholic and apostolic church established by Jesus Christ and his apostles. The Eastern Orthodox Church asserts to have been very careful in preserving these traditions. Eastern Orthodox Christians regard the Christian Bible as a collection of inspired texts that sprang out of this tradition, not the other way around; and the choices made in the compilation of the New Testament as having come from comparison with already firmly established faith. The Bible has come to be a very important part of tradition, but not the only part.

Tradition also includes the Nicene Creed, the decrees of the Seven Ecumenical Councils, the writings of the Church Fathers, as well as Eastern Orthodox laws (canons), liturgical books, icons, etc.

=== Consensus of the Fathers ===
Eastern Orthodoxy interprets truth based on three witnesses: the consensus of the Holy Fathers of the Church; the ongoing teaching of the Holy Spirit guiding the life of the church through the nous, or mind of the church (also called the "Universal Consciousness of the Church").

Some of the greatest theologians in the history of the church come from the 4th century, including the Cappadocian Fathers and the Three Hierarchs. However, the Eastern Orthodox do not consider the "Patristic era" to be a thing of the past, but rather that it continues in an unbroken succession of enlightened teachers (i.e., the saints, especially those who have left us theological writings) from the Apostles to the present day.

=== Scripture ===
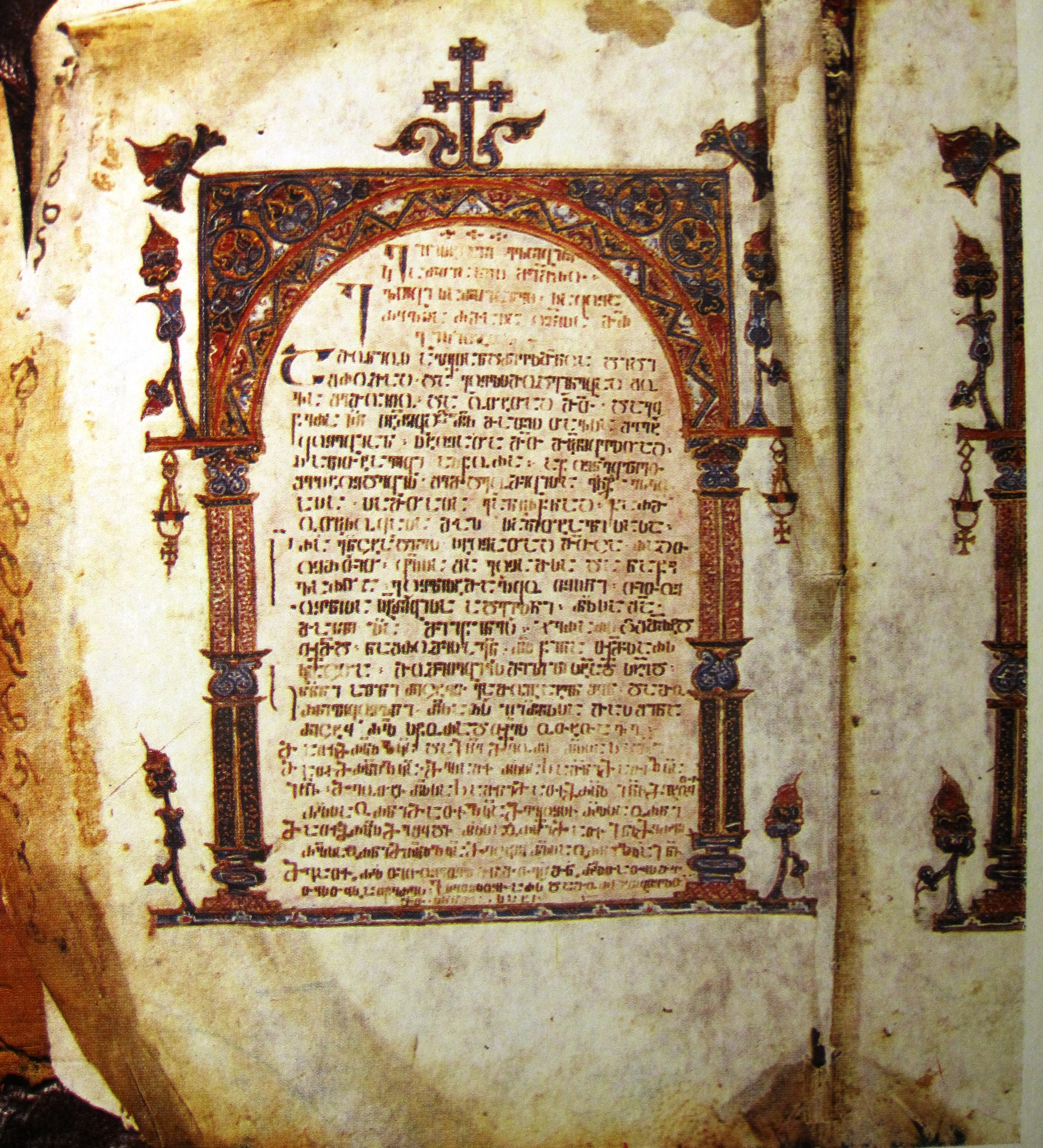
The Alaverdi Gospels, an 11th-century Georgian illuminated manuscript Gospel Book

The Eastern Orthodox also understand that a particular passage may be interpreted on many different levels simultaneously. However, interpretation is not a matter of personal opinion (2 Peter 1:20). For this reason, Eastern Orthodox depend upon the consensus of the Holy Fathers to provide a trustworthy guide to the accurate interpretation of Scripture.

Recent essays have been written by various contemporary Eastern Orthodox scholars which attempt to reconcile and react to both the creationist interpretation of Genesis 1-2 and the Darwinian theory of human evolution.

== God ==
=== Trinity ===
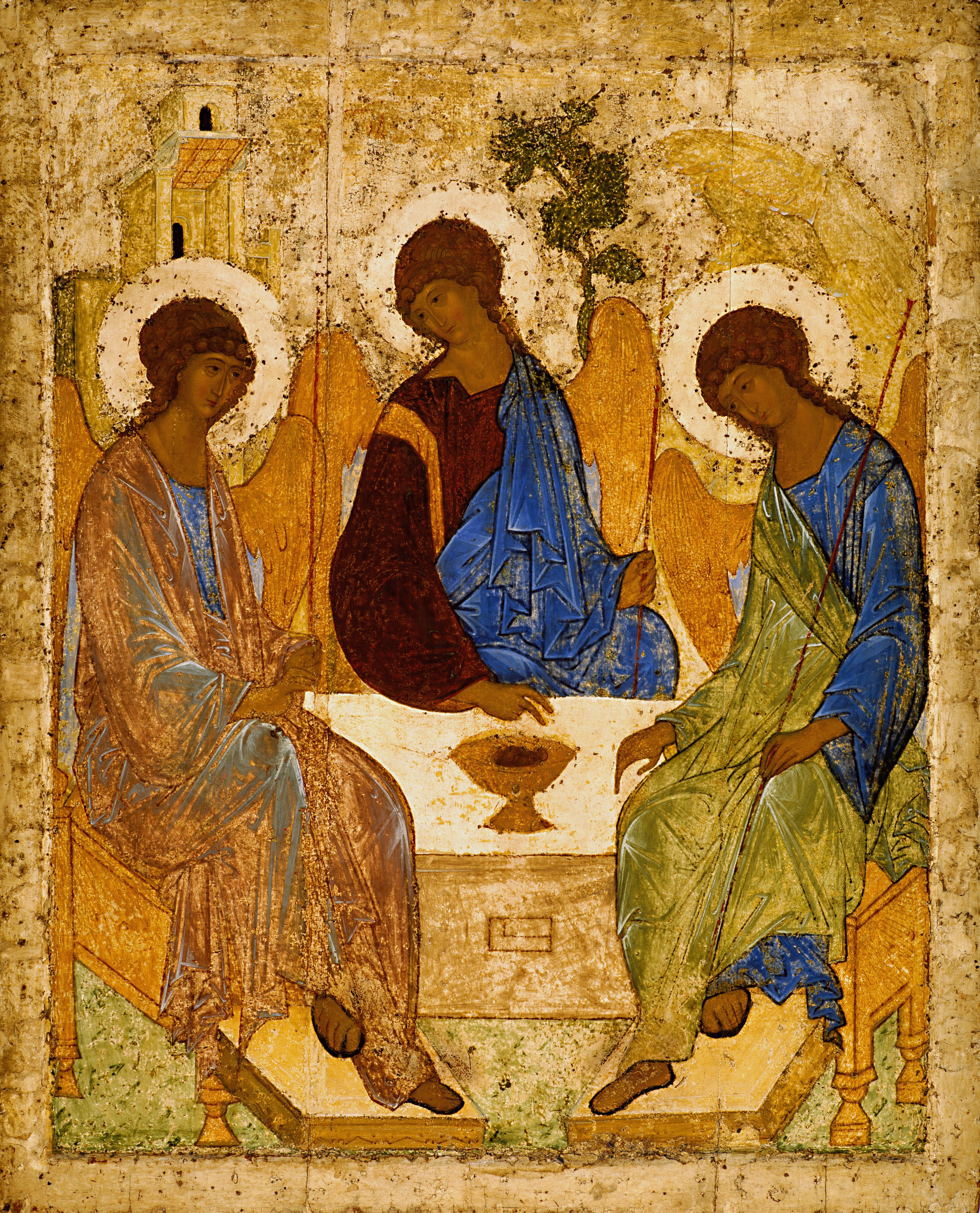
The Trinity by Russian icon painter Andrei Rublev, early 15th century

Eastern Orthodox Christians believe in a monotheistic conception of God (God is only one), which is both transcendent (wholly independent of, and removed from, the material universe) and immanent (involved in the material universe). In discussing God's relationship to his creation, Eastern Orthodox theology distinguishes between God's eternal essence, which is totally transcendent, and his uncreated energies, which is how he reaches humanity. The God who is transcendent and the God who touches mankind are one and the same. That is, these energies are not something that proceed from God or that God produces, but rather they are God himself: distinct, yet inseparable from God's inner being.

Eastern Orthodox Christians believe in a single God who is both three and one (triune); the Father, Son, and Holy Spirit, "one in essence and undivided". The Trinity, three distinct, divine persons (hypostases), without overlap or modality among them, who each have one divine essence (ousia, Greek: οὐσία)—uncreated, immaterial, and eternal. The Father is eternal and not begotten and does not proceed from any, the Son is eternal and begotten of the Father, and the Holy Spirit is eternal and proceeds from the Father. Eastern Orthodox doctrine regarding the Trinity is summarised in the Nicene Creed. The essence of God being that which is beyond human comprehension and cannot be defined or approached by human understanding.

=== Christology ===
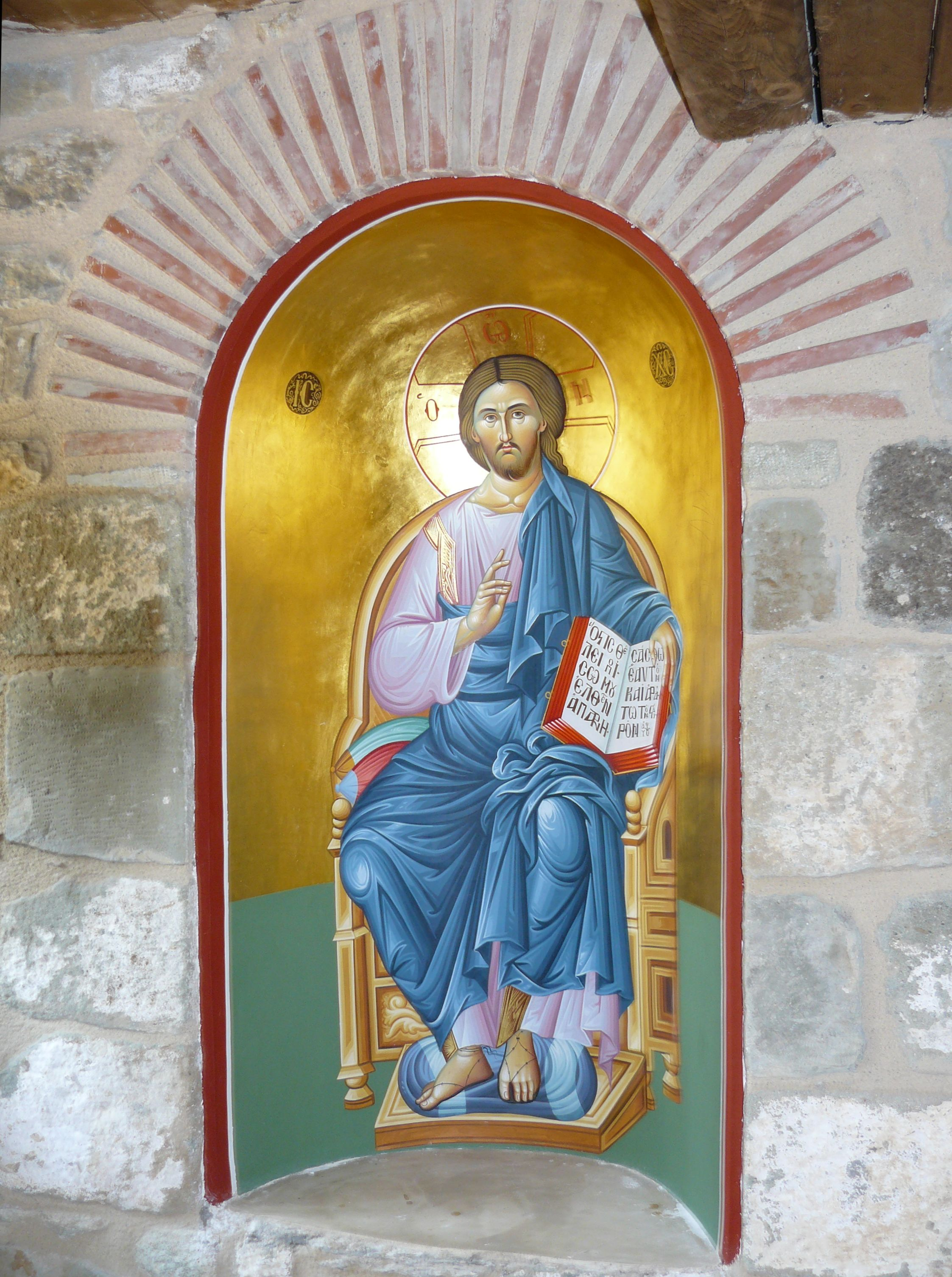
Christ Pantocrator, Holy Trinity's monastery, Meteora, Greece

Eastern Orthodox Christians believe the Word of God (Greek: Λόγος) is one person in two natures, both fully divine and fully human, perfectly God (τέλειος Θεός) and perfectly man (τέλειος άνθρωπος) united in the person of Jesus Christ, in a unique event known as "the Incarnation".

Eastern Orthodox Christians believe that Jesus of Nazareth is the promised Messiah of the Jews, the God of Israel come to be with his people, the redeemer of the human race who saves the world from sin and its effects, the comprehensible self-revelation of the incomprehensible God, and the pre-eternal Son begotten of the Father before all ages: "the only-begotten Son of God, begotten of the Father before all worlds (æons), Light of Light, very God of very God, begotten, not made, being of one substance with the Father."

=== Essence and energies ===
In discussing God's relationship to his creation a distinction is made within Eastern Orthodox theology between God's eternal essence and uncreated energies, though it is understood that this does not compromise the divine simplicity. Energies and essence are both inseparably God. The divine energies are the expressions of divine being in action according to Eastern Orthodox doctrine, whereas the persons of the Trinity are divine by nature. Hence, created beings are united to God through participation in the divine energies and not the divine essence or ousia.

=== Theodicy ===
The Eastern Orthodox theologian Olivier Clement wrote:

There is no need for Christians to create a special theory for justifying God (theodicy). To all the questions regarding the allowance of evil by God (the problem of evil) there is one answer – Christ; the Crucified Christ, Who burns up in Himself all the world's sufferings for ever; Christ, Who regenerates our nature and has opened the entry to the Kingdom of everlasting and full life to each one who desires it. The Eastern Orthodox Church teaches that from the time of Christ's coming into the world, the fullness of Divine Love is revealed to those who believe in Him, the veil is fallen, and the Lord's sacrifice has demonstrated His Divine Love in His resurrection. It only remains for the faithful to partake of this Love: "O taste and see that the Lord is good," exclaims David the Psalmist.

From an Eastern Orthodox perspective the concept of theodicy and the problem of evil stem both from a misconceived anthropology of man. Early on in the history of the Christian community Gnostics attacked the God of the Jews and the story of cosmic creation contained in the Torah. They regarded this God as inferior for allowing his creation to be imperfect and negative events to occur. Western Roman Catholic philosophers (such as Augustine, Anselm of Canterbury, and Thomas Aquinas) have attempted to develop theodicies for the Christian God.

Eastern Orthodox authors see theodicy as an exclusively Western preoccupation.

== Sin ==
The Eastern Orthodox Church holds the belief that following rules strictly without the heart "being in it" does not help a believer with his salvation. Sin is not fundamentally about transgressing a Divine law; rather, it stands for any behavior which "misses the mark", that is, fails to live up to the higher goal of conforming to God's nature, which is love.

Thus, in the Eastern Orthodox tradition sin is not viewed primarily as a guilty stain on the soul that needs to be wiped out, but rather as a pervading sickness or a failure to achieve the goal of a truly human life, fulfilling one's Divine design and function as the created likeness of God. Sin, therefore, implies the impetus to become something other than what we were created for, rather than guilt for violating a commandment. Because each person's experience is unique, conquering one's sinful habits requires individual attention and correction. The ultimate goal for this salvific process is to become divinized, to reflect the Divine likeness by becoming Christ-like in one's thought, life and behavior.

A traditional practice of Eastern Orthodoxy is, as in other apostolic churches, to have a spiritual mentor and guide to whom one confesses and who treats the sin on an individual basis. An experienced and spiritually mature guide will know how and when to apply strictness in dealing with sin and when to administer mercy.

=== Ancestral sin ===
In Eastern Orthodoxy, God created humanity with the ability to freely love him and gave humans a direction to follow. Man (Adam) and Woman (Eve) chose rather to disobey God by eating from the Tree of Knowledge of Good and Evil, thus changing the "perfect" mode of existence of Man into a flawed or "fallen" one. Since then a fallen nature and all that has come from it is the result of this "ancestral sin".

Man is not seen as inherently guilty of the sin committed by Adam, a view that differs from the Roman Catholic doctrine of original sin, where Adam is conceived as the federal head and legal representative of the human race, as first articulated by Latin Father Augustine of Hippo. (Note: Protopresbyter Michael Pomazansky, Orthodox Theology, Part II: God Manifest in the World, 5. Concerning Evil and Sin Footnote on Augustine and Original Sin. Man's fall into sin Perhaps no doctrine of the Eastern Orthodox Church has caused such heated discussions and misunderstandings in our day as has this doctrine of original or ancestral sin. The misunderstandings usually occur either from the desire to define the doctrine too precisely, or from overreactions to this over-definition. The expressions of the early Fathers in general (apart from Blessed Augustine in the West) do not go into the "how" of this matter, but simply state:"When Adam had transgressed, his sin reached unto all men" (St. Athanasius the Great, Four Discourses Against the Arians, 1, 51, Eerdmans English tr., p. 336). Some Eastern Orthodox Christians have mistakenly defended the Augustinian notion of "original guilt" — that is, that all men have inherited the guilt of Adam's sin — and others, going to the opposite extreme, have denied altogether the inheritance of sinfulness from Adam. Pomazansky rightly points out, in his balanced presentation, that from Adam we have indeed inherited our tendency towards sin, together with the death and corruption that are now part of our sinful nature, but we have not inherited the guilt of Adam's personal sin. The term "original sin" itself comes from Blessed Augustine's treatise De Peccato Originale, and a few people imagine that merely to use this term implies acceptance of Augustine's exaggerations of this doctrine. This, of course, need not be the case. In Greek (and Russian) there are two terms used to express this concept, usually translated "original sin" and "ancestral sin." One Eastern Orthodox scholar in the Greek (Old Calendar) Church describes them as follows: "There are two terms used in Greek for 'original sin.' The first, progoniki amartia is used frequently in the Fathers (St. Symeon the New Theologian, St. Maximus the Confessor). I have always seen it translated 'original sin,' though Greek theologians are careful when they use the term to distinguish it from the term as it is applied in translating St. Augustine. The second expression one sees is to propatorikon amartima, which is literally 'ancestral sin.' John Karmiria, the Greek theologian, suggests in his dogmatic volumes that the latter term, used in later confessions, does not suggest anything as strong as Augustinian 'original sin,' but certainly suggests that 'everyone is conceived in sin.' "There are sometimes extreme reactions against and for original sin. As recent Greek theologians have pointed out, original sin in Orthodoxy is so tied to the notion of divinization (theosis) and the unspotted part of man (and thus to Christology) that the Augustinian overstatement (of man's fallen nature) causes some discomfort. In the expression 'original sin' the West often includes original guilt, which so clouds the divine potential in man that the term becomes burdensome. There is, of course, no notion of original guilt in Orthodoxy. The Western notion compromises the spiritual goal of man, his theosis and speaks all too lowly of him. Yet rejecting the concept because of this misunderstanding tends to lift man too high — dangerous in so arrogant a time as ours. The balanced Orthodox view is that man has received death and corruption through Adam (original sin), though he does not share Adam's guilt. Many Orthodox, however, have accepted an impossible translation of Romans 5:12, which does not say that we have all sinned in Adam, but that, like Adam, we have all sinned and have found death" (Archimandrite Chrysostomos, St. Gregory Palamas Monastery, Hayesville, Ohio). The King James Version rightly translates Romans 5:12 as: "And so death passed upon all men, for that all have sinned." The Latin translation of the latter clause, "in whom all have sinned," overstates the doctrine and might be interpreted to imply that all men are guilty of Adam's sin.)

In the book Ancestral Sin, John S. Romanides addresses the concept of original sin, which he understands as an inheritance of ancestral sin from previous generations. Romanides asserts that original sin (understood as innate guilt) is not an apostolic doctrine of the church nor cohesive with the Eastern Orthodox faith, but rather an unfortunate innovation of later church fathers such as Augustine. In the realm of ascetics it is by choice, not birth, that one takes on the sins of the world.

=== Hell ===
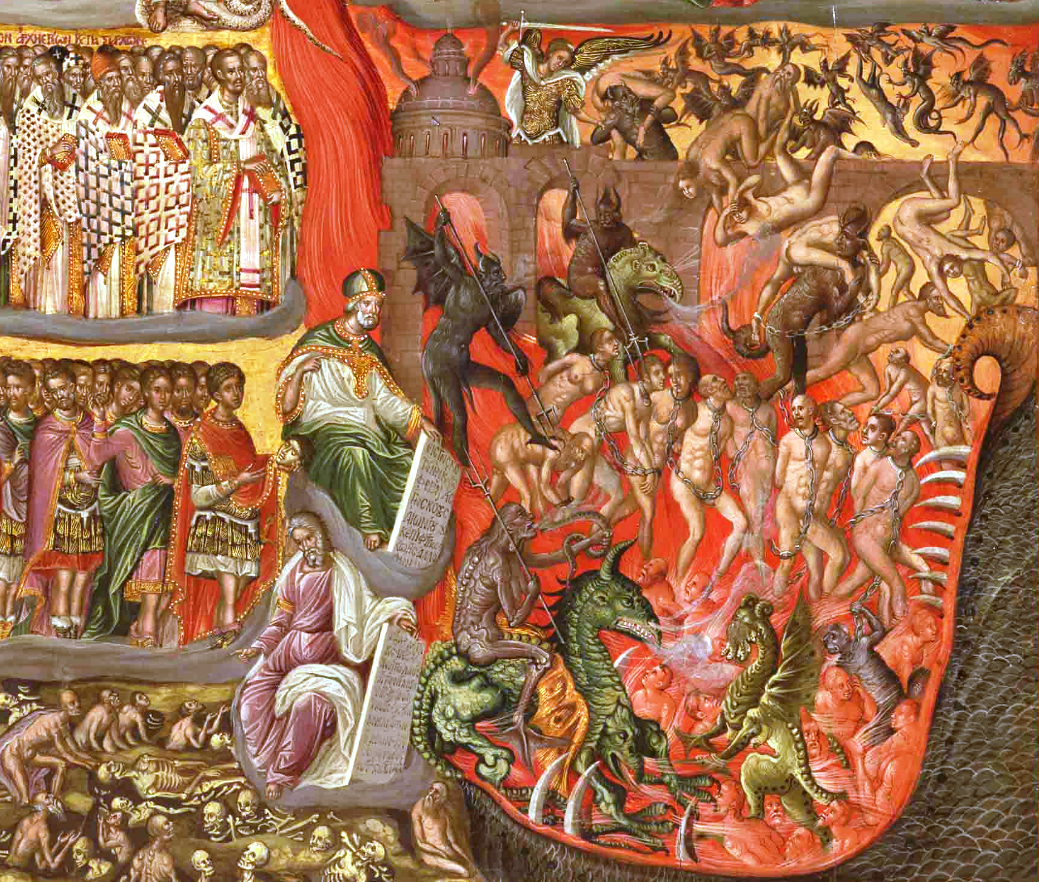
Detail of Hell in a painting depicting the Second Coming (Georgios Klontzas, late 16th century)

The Eastern Orthodox Church, as well as the Non-Chalcedonian churches (i.e., Oriental Orthodoxy and Assyrian Church of the East), teach that both the elect and the lost enter into the presence of God after death, and that the elect experience this presence as light and rest, while the lost experience it as darkness and torment.

=== Satan ===
In Eastern Orthodoxy, Satan is one of the three enemies of humanity along with sin and death.

== Salvation ==
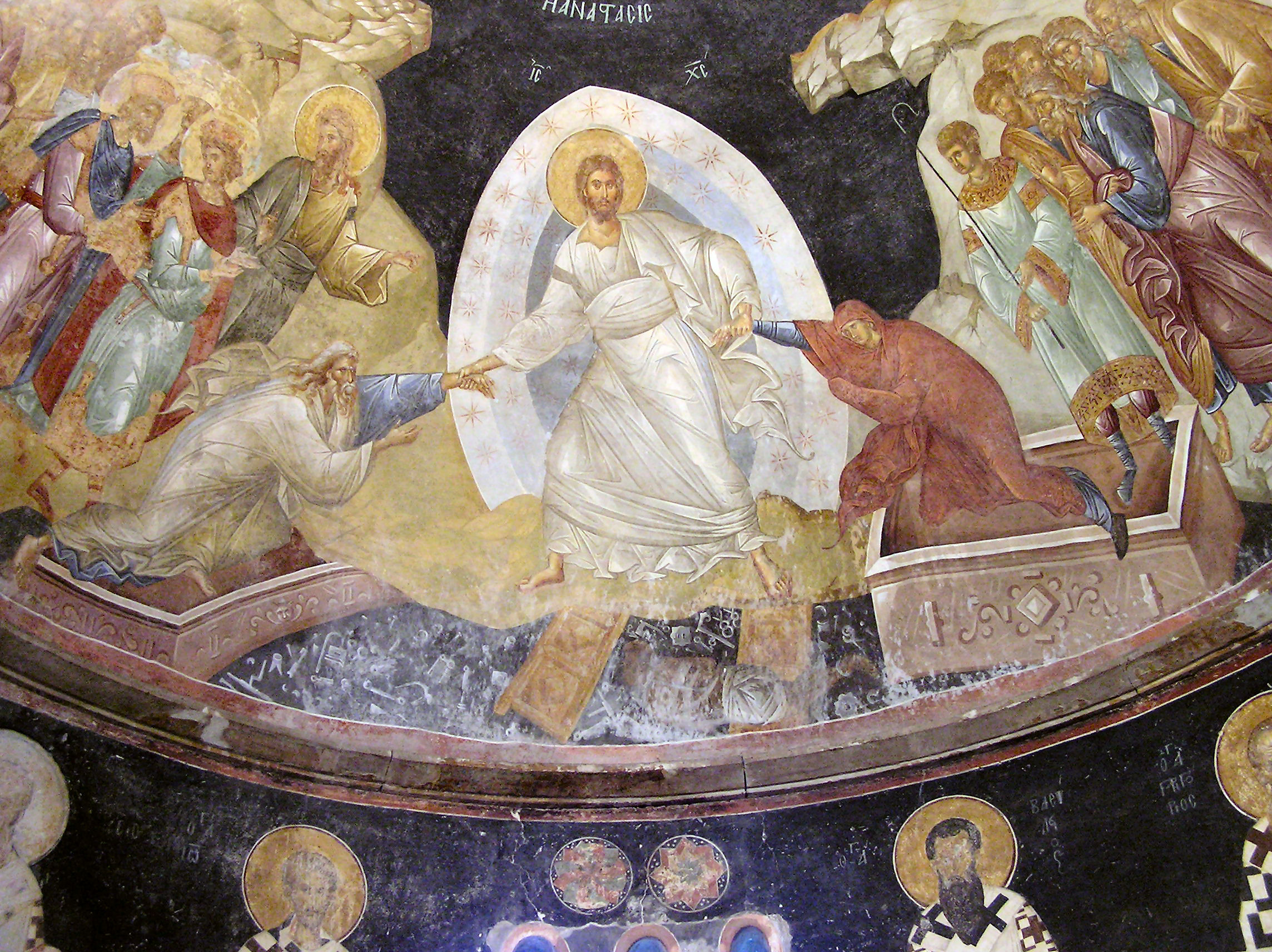
Eastern Orthodox icon of the Resurrection (14th-century fresco, Chora Church, Istanbul)

=== Disrupted communion with God ===
Salvation, or "being saved", refers to this process of being saved from death and corruption and the fate of hell. The Orthodox Church believes that its teachings and practices represent the true path to participation in the gifts of God. Yet, it should be understood that the Orthodox do not believe that someone must be Orthodox to participate in salvation. God is merciful to all. The Orthodox believe that there is nothing that a person (Orthodox or non-Orthodox) can do to earn salvation. It is rather a gift from God. However, this gift of relationship has to be accepted by the believer, since God will not force salvation on humanity. Man is free to reject the gift of salvation continually offered by God. To be saved, man must work together with God in a synergeia whereby his entire being, including his will, effort and actions, are perfectly conformed with, and united to, the divine. Vladimir Lossky:

God becomes powerless before human freedom; He cannot violate it since it flows from His own omnipotence. Certainly man was created by the will of God alone; but he cannot be deified [made Holy] by it alone. A single will for creation, but two for deification. A single will to raise up the image, but two to make the image into a likeness. The love of God for man is so great that it cannot constrain; for there is no love without respect. Divine will always will submit itself to gropings, to detours, even to revolts of human will to bring it to a free consent.

=== Resurrection and return of Christ ===
Eastern Orthodoxy considers the most important thing to happen to be the life, resurrection, and promise to return, of Jesus Christ. They believe Jesus was killed on a cross under the authority of Pontius Pilate, entombed, and brought back to life 3 days later. This belief is core to the church and is how sin is fully absolved. It is then said Jesus continued to walk the earth for 40 days, as described in the new testament, before ascending into heaven.

=== Deification ===
The ultimate goal of the Eastern Orthodox Christian is to achieve theosis ("deification") or conformity to and intimate union with God.

=== Noetic renewal as spiritual therapy ===
A central concept in Eastern Christianity is nous (typically translated "mind" or "understanding"), the apperceptive and relational faculty of attention or awareness which is the center, heart, or spirit of the person. Nous is the eye or soul of the person. It is the nous that is both logical and intuitive understanding. It was humanity's nous that was damaged by Adam's sin and fall and it was this damaged consciousness that each human by birth now receives.

It is the nous which has to be healed and nourished by means of illumination (see theoria). In Eastern Orthodox thought, the church offers a therapeutic treatment for pain, suffering, and the search for value in existence. Eastern Orthodox Christianity is healing or therapeutic, and works in each individual to overcome their passions (i.e. evil thoughts, pasts, addictions).

As a reorientation of the self, faith (pistis) is sometimes used interchangeably with noesis in Eastern Christianity. Faith is the intuitive, noetic experience of the nous or spirit. Transformative faith is a gift from God and among his uncreated operations.

According to anti-Latin polemicist John Romanides, Western Christianity does not offer a spiritual cure for spiritual problems, but expresses salvation as a worldly (religious) goal in the pursuit of happiness, rather than seeking to attain the vision of God and transcend the self. Spiritual work is done to reconcile the heart and mind, by putting the mind in the heart, and then contemplating through our intuition. (Note: Father Archimandrite Rafael (Karelin): "Conquer yourself – this is the highest of all victories.") According to Lossky, rationalism reduces man and nature to cold mechanical concepts, interpretations and symbols of reality not reality in and of itself.

== Mother of God ==
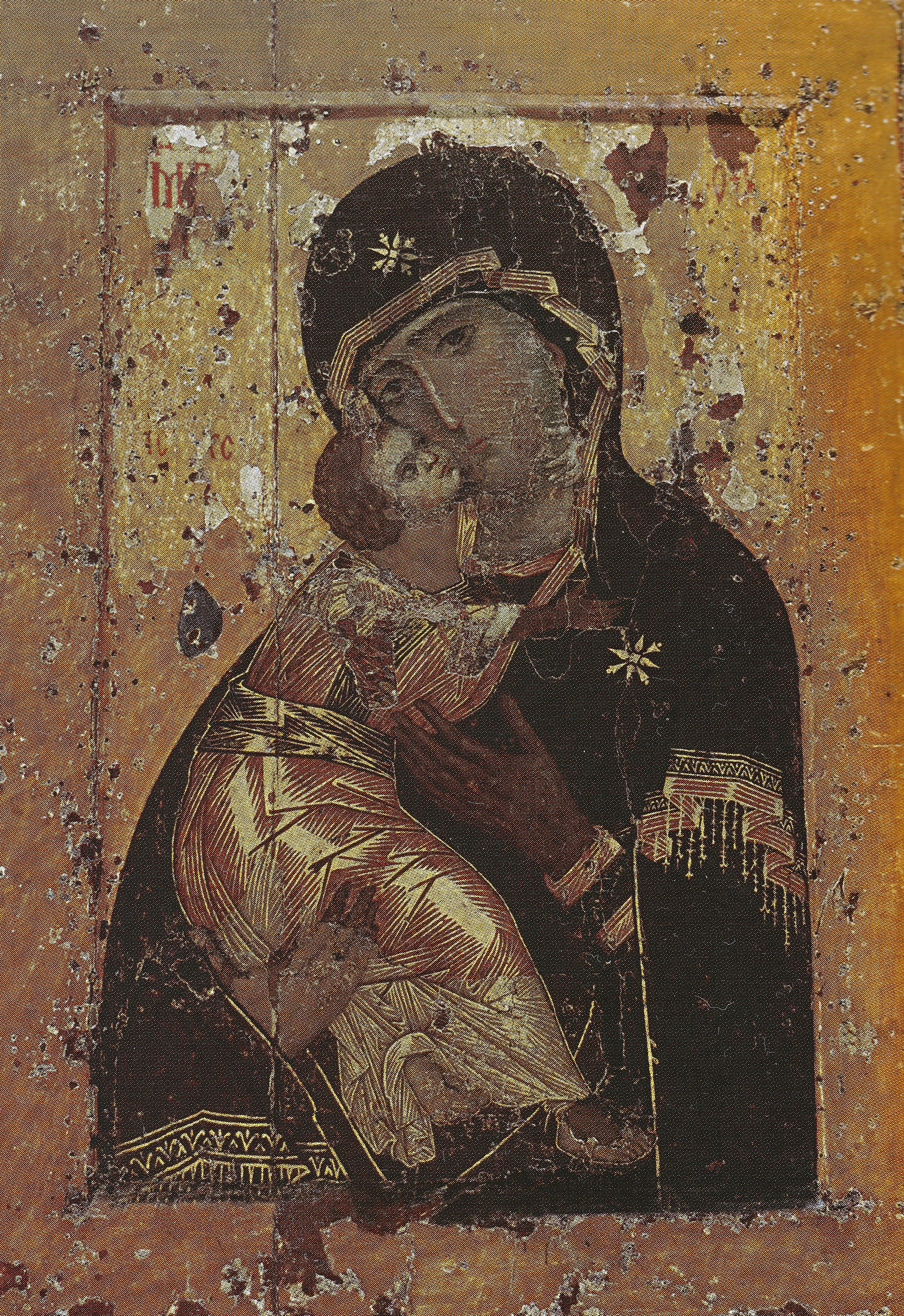
The Theotokos of Vladimir, one of the most venerated of Orthodox Christian icons of the Virgin Mary

Pre-eminent among the saints is the Virgin Mary (commonly referred to as Theotokos or Bogorodica: "Mother of God"). In Eastern Orthodox theology, the Mother of God is the fulfillment of the Old Testament archetypes revealed in the Ark of the Covenant (because she carried the New Covenant in the person of Christ) and the burning bush that appeared before Moses (symbolizing the Mother of God's carrying of God without being consumed).

The Eastern Orthodox believe that Christ, from the moment of his conception, was both fully God and fully human. Mary is thus called the Theotokos or Bogorodica as an affirmation of the divinity of the one to whom she gave birth. It is also believed that her virginity was not compromised in conceiving God-incarnate, that she was not harmed and that she remained forever a virgin. Scriptural references to "brothers" of Christ are interpreted as kin. Due to her unique place in salvation history according to Eastern Orthodox teaching, Mary is honored above all other saints in this religion and especially venerated for the great work that God accomplished through her.

== Saints, relics, and the deceased ==
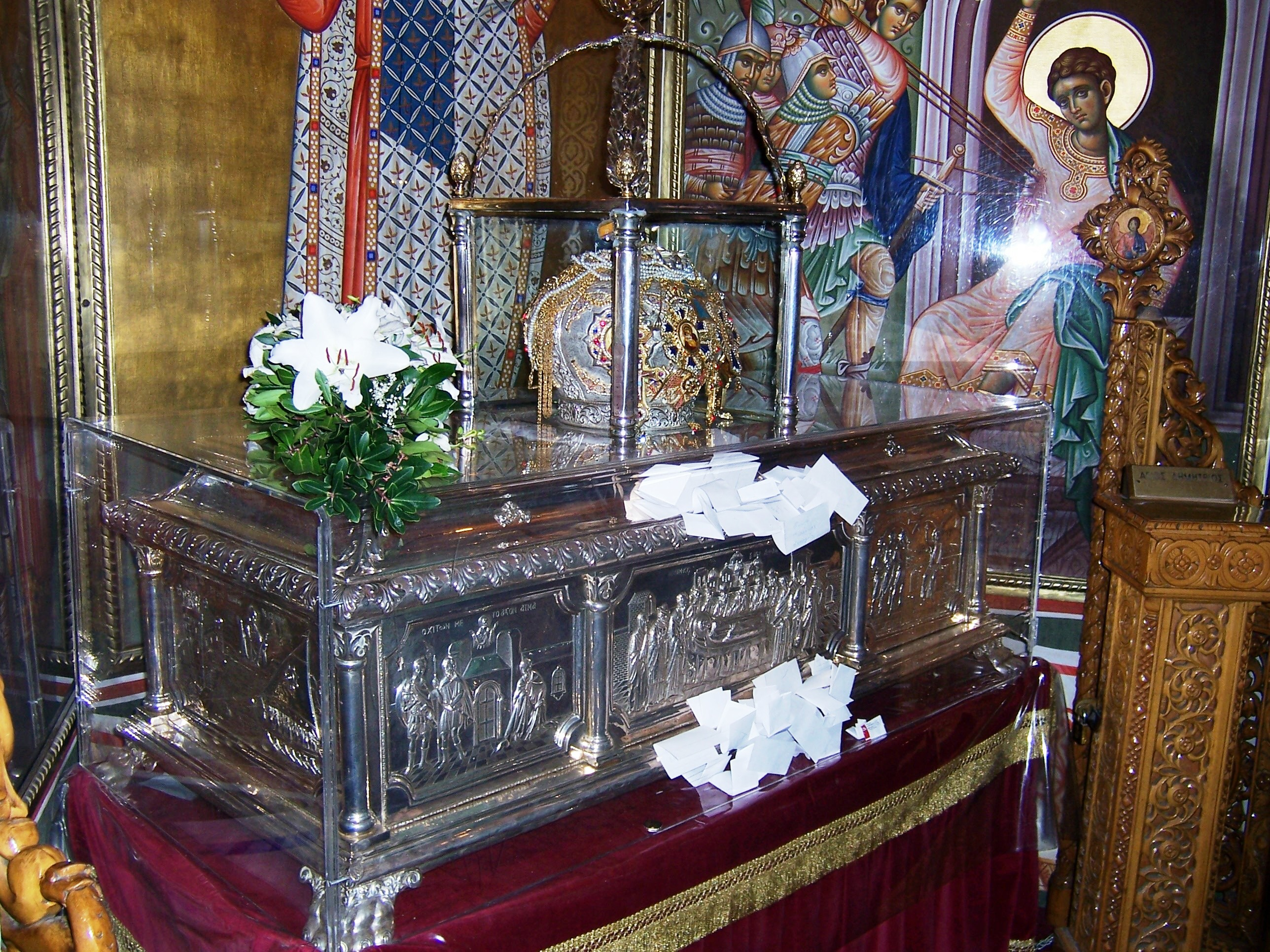
Relics of Saint Demetrius in Thessalonika, Greece

The Eastern Orthodox Church regards the bodies of all saints as holy because of their participation in prescribed rituals called holy mysteries. Physical items connected with saints are also regarded as holy, through their participation in the earthly works of those saints. According to Eastern Orthodox teaching and tradition, God himself bears witness to this holiness of saints' relics through the many miracles connected with them that have been reported throughout history since biblical times, often including healing from disease and injury.

== See also ==
- Byzantine philosophy
- Russian philosophy
- History of Eastern Orthodox theology
- History of Eastern Orthodox theology in the 20th century
- Palamism
- Essence–energies distinction
- Theosis (Eastern Christian theology)
- Christian contemplation
- Phronema
- Mariology
- Theological differences between the Catholic Church and the Eastern Orthodox Church
- Ecclesiastical differences between the Catholic Church and the Eastern Orthodox Church
