= Uncreated Light =

Palamist doctrine of seeing God's light

In Eastern Orthodox Christian theology, the Tabor Light (Ancient Greek: Φῶς τοῦ Θαβώρ "Light of Tabor", or Ἄκτιστον Φῶς "Uncreated Light", Θεῖον Φῶς "Divine Light"; Russian: Фаворский свет "Taboric Light"; Georgian: თაბორის ნათება) is the light revealed on Mount Tabor at the Transfiguration of Jesus, identified with the light seen by Paul at his conversion.

As a theological doctrine, the uncreated nature of the Light of Tabor was formulated in the 14th century by Gregory Palamas, an Athonite monk, defending the mystical practices of Hesychasm against accusations of heresy by Barlaam of Calabria. When considered as a theological doctrine, this view is known as Palamism after Palamas.

The view was very controversial when it was first proposed, sparking the Hesychast controversy, and the Palamist faction prevailed only after the military victory of John VI Kantakouzenos in the Byzantine civil war of 1341–1347. Since 1347, it has been the official doctrine in Eastern Orthodoxy, while it remains without explicit affirmation or denial by the Catholic Church. Catholic theologians have rejected it in the past, but the Catholic view has tended to be more favourable since the later 20th century. Several Western scholars have presented Palamism as compatible with Catholic doctrine. In particular, Pope John Paul II in 1996 spoke favourably of hesychast spirituality, and in 2002 he named the Transfiguration as the fourth Luminous Mystery of the Holy Rosary.

== In Eastern Orthodoxy ==
According to the Hesychast mystic tradition of Eastern Orthodox spirituality, a completely purified saint who has attained divine union experiences the vision of divine radiance that is the same 'light' that was manifested to Jesus' disciples on Mount Tabor at the Transfiguration. This experience is referred to as theoria. Barlaam (and Western Christianity's interpretation of apophaticism being the absence of God rather than the unknowability of God) held this view of the hesychasts to be polytheistic inasmuch as it seemed to postulate two eternal substances, a visible (the divine energies) and an invisible (the divine ousia or essence). Seco and Maspero assert that the Palamite doctrine of the uncreated light is rooted in Palamas' reading of Gregory of Nyssa.

Instances of the Uncreated Light are read into the Old Testament by Orthodox Christians, e.g. the Burning Bush.

=== Identification with the fires of hell ===
Many Orthodox theologians have identified the Tabor light with the fire of hell. According to these theologians, hell is the condition of those who remain unreconciled to the uncreated light and love of and for God and are burned by it. According to Iōannēs Polemēs, Theophanes of Nicea believed that, for sinners, "the divine light will be perceived as the punishing fire of hell".

According to Iōannēs Polemēs, Palamas himself did not identify hell-fire with the Tabor light: "Unlike Theophanes, Palamas did not believe that sinners could have an experience of the divine light [...] Nowhere in his works does Palamas seem to adopt Theophanes' view that the light of Tabor is identical with the fire of hell."

== Roman Catholicism ==
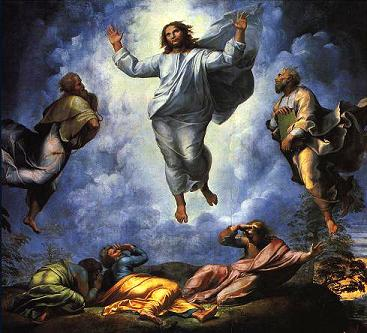
The upper part of The Transfiguration (1520) by Raphael, depicting Christ miraculously discoursing with Moses and Elijah.

Palamism, Gregory Palamas' theology of divine "operations", was never accepted by the Scholastic theologians of the Latin Catholic Church, who maintained a strong view of the simplicity of God, conceived as Actus purus. This doctrinal division reinforced the east–west split of the Great Schism throughout the 15th to 19th centuries, with only Pope John Paul II opening a possibility for reconciliation by expressing his personal respect for the doctrine.

Catholicism traditionally sees the glory manifested at Tabor as symbolic of the eschatological glory of heaven, as exemplified in the 15th-century Latin hymn Coelestis formam gloriae:

O wondrous type, O vision fair
of glory that the Church shall share
Which Christ upon the mountain shows
where brighter than the sun He glows
With shining face and bright array
Christ deigns to manifest today
What glory shall be theirs above
who joy in God with perfect love.

Pope Gregory the Great wrote of people by whom, "while still living in this corruptible flesh, yet growing in incalculable power by a certain piercingness of contemplation, the Eternal Brightness is able to be seen." In his poem The Book of the Twelve Béguines, John of Ruysbroeck, a 14th-century Flemish mystic beatified by Pope Pius X in 1908, wrote of "the uncreated Light, which is not God, but is the intermediary between Him and the 'seeing thought'" as illuminating the contemplative not in the highest mode of contemplation, but in the second of the four ascending modes.

Roman Catholic pro-ecumenism under John Paul II from the 1980s sought for common ground in questions of doctrinal division between the Eastern and the Western Church. John Paul II repeatedly emphasized his respect for Eastern theology as an enrichment for the whole church, and spoke favourably of Hesychasm. In 2002, he also named the Transfiguration as the fourth Luminous Mystery of the Holy Rosary. The Eastern doctrine of "uncreated light" has not been officially accepted in the Catholic Church, which likewise has not officially condemned it. Increasing parts of the Western Church consider Gregory Palamas a saint, even if uncanonized. "Several Western scholars contend that the teaching of St. Gregory Palamas himself is compatible with Roman Catholic thought on the matter." At the same time, anti-ecumenical currents within Eastern Orthodoxy presented the Tabor Light doctrine as a major dogmatic division between the Eastern and the Western Church, with the Hesychast movement even described as "a direct condemnation of Papism".

== See also ==
- Apotheosis
- Beatific vision
- Christian mysticism
- Divine illumination
- Divinization
- Enlightenment in Buddhism
- Halo (religious iconography)
- Holy Fire
- Mystical theology
- Nous
- Ohr (Kabbalah)
- Theophany
- Theosis
