= Hesychasm =

Eastern Christian contemplative prayer

Hesychasm (/ˈhɛsɪkæzəm, ˈhɛzɪ-/) is a contemplative monastic tradition in the Eastern Christian traditions of the Eastern Orthodox Church and Eastern Catholic Churches in which stillness (hēsychia) is sought through uninterrupted Jesus prayer. (Note: Encyclopedia Britannica, Hesychasm) While rooted in early Christian monasticism, it took its definitive form in the 14th century at Mount Athos.

== Etymology ==
Hesychasm (Greek: ἡσυχασμός [isixaˈzmos]) derives from the word hesychia (ἡσυχία [isiˈçia]), meaning "stillness, rest, quiet, silence" and hesychazo (ἡσυχάζω [isiˈxazo]) "to keep stillness".

== Origins and development ==
Metropolitan Kallistos, a scholar of Eastern Orthodox theology, distinguishes five distinct usages of the term "hesychasm":

1. "solitary life", a sense, equivalent to "eremitical life", in which the term is used since the 4th century;
2. "the practice of inner prayer, aiming at union with God on a level beyond images, concepts and language";
3. "the quest for such union through the Jesus Prayer";
4. "a particular psychosomatic technique in combination with the Jesus Prayer", use of which technique can be traced back at least to the 13th century;
5. "the theology of St. Gregory Palamas", on which see Palamism.

=== Early Christian monasticism ===
==== Solitary ascetic life ====
Christian monasticism started with the legalisation of Christianity in the 4th century. The term hesychast is used sparingly in Christian ascetical writings emanating from Egypt from the 4th century on, although the writings of Evagrius and the Sayings of the Desert Fathers do attest to it. In Egypt, the terms more often used are anchoretism (Gr. ἀναχώρησις, "withdrawal, retreat"), and anchorite (Gr. ἀναχωρητής, "one who withdraws or retreats, i.e., a hermit").

The term hesychast was used in the 6th century in Palestine in the Lives of Cyril of Scythopolis. Many of the hesychasts Cyril describes were his own contemporaries; several of the saints about whom Cyril was writing, especially Euthymios and Savas, were in fact from Cappadocia. The laws (novellae) of the emperor Justinian I (r. 527–565) treat hesychast and anchorite as synonyms, making them interchangeable terms.

==== Inner prayer ====
The practice of inner prayer, which aims at "inward stillness or silence of the heart", dates back to at least the 4th century. Evagrius Ponticus (345–399), John Climacus (St. John of Sinai; 6th–7th century), Maximus the Confessor (c. 580–662), and Symeon the New Theologian (949–1022) are representatives of this hesychast spirituality. John Climacus, in his influential Ladder of Divine Ascent, describes several stages of contemplative or hesychast practice, culminating in agape.

The earliest reference to the Jesus prayer is in Diadochos of Photiki (c. 450). Neither Evagrius, Maximus, nor Symeon refers to the Jesus prayer. Saint John Cassian (c. 360–435), who transmitted Evagrius Ponticus's ascetical teachings to the West, forming the basis of much of the spirituality of the Order of Saint Benedict and the subsequent western mystical tradition, presents as the formula used in Egypt for repetitive prayer "O God, make speed to save me: O Lord, make haste to help me." (Note: John Cassian is not represented in the Philokalia except by two brief extracts, but this is most likely due to his having written in Latin. His works (Coenobitical Institutions and the Conferences))

=== Addition of psychosomatic techniques ===
St. Nicephorus the Hesychast (13th century), a Roman Catholic who converted to the Eastern Orthodox faith and became a monk at Mount Athos, advised monks to bend their heads toward the chest, "attach the prayer to their breathing" while controlling the rhythm of their breath, and "to fix their eyes during prayer on the 'middle of the body'", concentrating the mind within the heart in order to practice nepsis (watchfulness). While this is the earliest attestation of psychosomatic techniques in hesychast prayer, according to Kallistos Ware "its origins may well be far more ancient", influenced by the Sufi practice of dhikr, " the memory and invocation of the name of God", which in turn may have been influenced by Yoga practices from India, though it's also possible that Sufis were influenced by early Christian monasticism. (Note: Other authors have also speculated about Indian influences on Hesychasm via the Sufis. Dupuche, Dunn & Cross (2003) states that Indian monks were present in Mesopotamia and Syria in the 8th and 9th centuries, while Nath yogins were in Central Asia and Iran in the 11th century, influencing Sufi brotherhoods.)

In the early 14th century, Gregory Sinaita (1260s–1346) learned a form of disciplined mental prayer from Arsenius of Crete, rooted in the tradition of John Climacus. (Note: Encyclopedia Britannica, Gregory of Sinai Archived 2022-12-16 at the Wayback Machine) In 1310, he went to Mount Athos, where he remained until 1335 as a monk at the Skete of Magoula near Philotheou Monastery, introducing hesychast practice there. The terms Hesychasm and Hesychast were used by the monks on Mount Athos to refer to the practice and to the practitioner of a method of mental ascesis that involves the use of the Jesus Prayer assisted by certain psychophysical techniques.

=== Hesychast controversy and Palamism ===
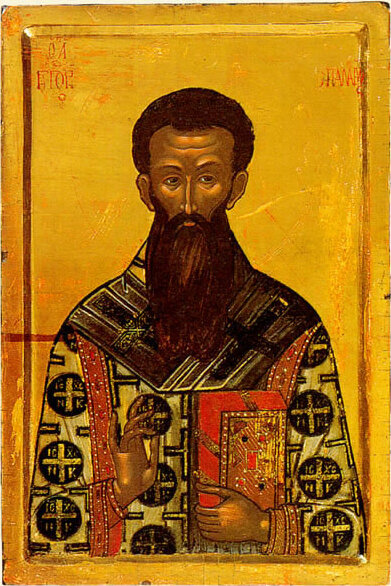
Gregory Palamas

About the year 1337, hesychasm attracted the attention of Barlaam of Seminara, a Calabrian monk who at that time held the office of abbot in the Monastery of St. Saviour in Constantinople and who visited Mount Athos. Mount Athos was then at the height of its fame and influence, under the reign of Andronicus III Palaeologus and the leadership of the Protos Symeon. On Mount Athos, Barlaam encountered hesychasts and heard descriptions of their practices, also reading the writings of the teacher in hesychasm of St. Gregory Palamas, himself an Athonite monk. Trained in Western Scholastic theology, Barlaam was scandalized by hesychasm and began to combat it both orally and in his writings. As a private teacher of theology in the Western Scholastic mode, Barlaam propounded a more intellectual and propositional approach to the knowledge of God than the hesychasts taught.

Barlaam took exception to the doctrine entertained by the hesychasts as to the nature of the light, the experience of which was said to be the goal of hesychast practice, regarding it as heretical and blasphemous. It was maintained by the hesychasts to be of divine origin and to be identical to the light which had been manifested to Jesus' disciples on Mount Tabor at the Transfiguration. This Barlaam held to be polytheistic, inasmuch as it postulated two eternal substances, a visible and an invisible God. Hesychasm was linked with Messalianiam and Bogomilism.

On the hesychast side, the controversy was taken up by St. Gregory Palamas, afterwards Archbishop of Thessalonica, who was asked by his fellow monks on Mt Athos to defend hesychasm from the attacks of Barlaam. St. Gregory himself was well-educated in Greek philosophy. St. Gregory defended hesychasm in the 1340s at three different synods in Constantinople, and he also wrote a number of works in its defense.

In these works, St. Gregory Palamas uses a distinction, already found in the 4th century in the works of the Cappadocian Fathers, between the energies or operations (Gr. energeiai) of God and the essence of God. St. Gregory taught that the energies or operations of God were uncreated. He taught that the essence of God can never be known by his creature even in the next life, but that his uncreated energies or operations can be known both in this life and in the next, and convey to the hesychast in this life and to the righteous in the next life a true spiritual knowledge of God. In Palamite theology, it is the uncreated energies of God that illumine the hesychast who has been vouchsafed an experience of the uncreated light.

In 1341, the dispute came before a synod held at Constantinople and presided over by the Emperor Andronicus III; the synod, taking into account the regard in which the writings of the pseudo-Dionysius were held, condemned Barlaam, who recanted and returned to Calabria, afterwards becoming a bishop in the Catholic Church.

One of Barlaam's friends, Gregory Akindynos, who originally was also a friend of St. Gregory Palamas, took up the controversy, which also played a role in the civil war between the supporters of John Cantacuzenus and John V Palaiologos. Three other synods on the subject were held, at the second of which the followers of Barlaam gained a brief victory. But in 1351 at a synod under the presidency of the Emperor John VI Cantacuzenus, hesychast doctrine was established as the doctrine of the Orthodox Church.

=== Introduction in Russia ===
St. Paisius Velichkovsky and his disciples made the practice known in Russia and Romania, although hesychasm was already previously known in Russia, as is attested by St. Seraphim of Sarov's independent practice of it.

== Practice ==
=== Acquiring inner stillness ===
The hesychast interprets Jesus's injunction in the Gospel of Matthew to "go into your closet to pray" to mean that one should ignore the senses and withdraw inward. Saint John of Sinai writes:

Hesychasm is the enclosing of the bodiless primary cognitive faculty of the soul (Orthodoxy teaches of two cognitive faculties, the nous and logos) in the bodily house of the body.

=== Stages in hesychast practice ===
Theosis is obtained by engaging in contemplative prayer resulting from the cultivation of watchfulness (Gk: nepsis). This doesn't mean that human, created energy obtains theosis by itself, i.e., without God. Holy Spirit is a doer of theosis, because He gives Christ's grace and Father's love to the purifying ones. According to the standard ascetic formulation of this process, there are three stages:

- Katharsis (κάθαρσις) or purification,
- Theoria (θεωρία) or illumination, and
- Theosis (θέωσις) or deification (also referred to as union with God). (Note: Purification, and illumination of the noetic faculty, prepare for the vision of God. Without this it is impossible for man's selfish love to be transformed into selfless love. This transformation takes place during the higher level of the stage of illumination called theoria, literally meaning vision, in this case vision by means of unceasing and uninterrupted memory of God. Those who remain selfish and self-centered with a hardened heart, closed to God's love, will not see the glory of God in this life. However, they will see God's glory eventually, but as an eternal and consuming fire and outer darkness. From Franks, Romans, feudalism, and doctrine: Diagnosis and Therapy, Father John S. Romanides Diagnosis and Therapy)

==== Katharsis (ascese/purification) ====
Sobriety contributes to this mental ascesis that rejects tempting thoughts; it puts a great emphasis on focus and attention. The hesychast is to pay extreme attention to the consciousness of his inner world and the words of the Jesus Prayer, not letting his mind wander in any way at all. While he maintains his practice of the Jesus Prayer, which becomes automatic and continues twenty-four hours a day, seven days a week, the hesychast cultivates nepsis, watchful attention, to reject tempting thoughts (the "thieves") that come to the hesychast as he watches in sober attention in his hermitage. St. John of Sinai describes hesychast practice as follows:

Take up your seat on a high place and watch, if only you know how, and then you will see in what manner, when, whence, how many and what kind of thieves come to enter and steal your clusters of grapes. When the watchman grows weary, he stands up and prays; and then he sits down again and courageously takes up his former task.

The hesychast is to attach Eros (Greek: eros), that is, "yearning", to his practice of sobriety so as to overcome the temptation to acedia (sloth). He is also to use an extremely directed and controlled anger against the tempting thoughts, although to obliterate them entirely, he is to invoke Jesus Christ via the Jesus Prayer.

Much of the literature of hesychasm is occupied with the psychological analysis of such tempting thoughts (e.g., St. Mark the Ascetic). This psychological analysis owes much to the ascetical works of Evagrius Pontikos, with its doctrine of the eight passions.

==== Theoria (illumination) ====
The primary task of the hesychast is to engage in mental ascesis. The hesychast is to bring his mind (Gr. nous) into his heart so as to practise both the Jesus Prayer and sobriety with his mind in his heart. In solitude and retirement, the hesychast repeats the Jesus Prayer, "Lord Jesus Christ, son of God, have mercy on me, the sinner." The hesychast prays the Jesus Prayer 'with the heart' – with meaning, with intent, "for real" (see ontic). He never treats the Jesus Prayer as a string of syllables whose "surface" or overt verbal meaning is secondary or unimportant. He considers bare repetition of the Jesus Prayer as a mere string of syllables, perhaps with a "mystical" inner meaning beyond the overt verbal meaning, to be worthless or even dangerous. This emphasis on the actual, real invocation of Jesus Christ mirrors an Eastern understanding of mantra in that physical action/voice and meaning are utterly inseparable.

The descent of the mind into the heart is not taken literally by the practitioners of hesychasm, but is considered metaphorically. Some of the psychophysical techniques described in the texts are to assist the descent of the mind into the heart at those times that only with difficulty it descends on its own.

The goal at this stage is a practice of the Jesus Prayer with the mind in the heart, which practice is free of images (see Pros Theodoulon). By the exercise of sobriety (the mental ascesis against tempting thoughts), the hesychast arrives at a continual practice of the Jesus Prayer with his mind in his heart and where his consciousness is no longer encumbered by the spontaneous inception of images: his mind has a certain stillness and emptiness that is punctuated only by the eternal repetition of the Jesus Prayer.

This stage is called the guard of the mind. This is a very advanced stage of ascetical and spiritual practice, and attempting to accomplish this prematurely, especially with psychophysical techniques, can cause very serious spiritual and emotional harm to the would-be hesychast. St. Theophan the Recluse once remarked that bodily postures and breathing techniques were virtually forbidden in his youth, since, instead of gaining the Spirit of God, people succeeded only "in ruining their lungs".

The guard of the mind is the practical goal of the hesychast. It is the condition in which he remains as a matter of course throughout his day, every day until he dies.

There is a very great emphasis on humility in the practice of the prayer. Along with this, there are cautions given in the texts about the calamity that would follow the would-be hesychast if he were to indulge pride, arrogance, or conceit. It is also assumed in the hesychast texts that the hesychast is a member of the Orthodox Church in good standing.

==== Theosis (deification) ====
Theosis is from the guard of the mind that he is raised to contemplation by the grace of God.

The hesychast usually experiences the contemplation of God as light, the "uncreated light" of the theology of St. Gregory Palamas. The hesychast, when he has by the mercy of God been granted such an experience, does not remain in that experience for a very long time (there are exceptions – see for example the Life of St. Savas the Fool for Christ (14th century), written by St. Philotheos Kokkinos (14th century), but he returns "to earth" and continues to practise the guard of the mind.

The uncreated light that the hesychast experiences is identified with the Holy Spirit. Experiences of the uncreated light are allied to the 'acquisition of the Holy Spirit'. Notable accounts of encounters with the Holy Spirit in this fashion are found in St. Symeon the New Theologian's account of the illumination of "George" (considered a pseudonym of St. Symeon himself); in the "conversation with Motovilov" in the Life of St. Seraphim of Sarov (1759–1833); and, more recently, in the reminiscences of Elder Porphyrios (Bairaktaris) of Kafsokalivia (Wounded by Love pp. 27–31).

=== Prelest ===
Orthodox tradition warns against seeking ecstasy as an end in itself. Hesychasm is a traditional complex of ascetical practices embedded in the doctrine and practice of the Orthodox Church and intended to purify the member of the Orthodox Church and to make him ready for an encounter with God that comes to him when and if God wants, through God's grace. The goal is to acquire, through purification and grace, the Holy Spirit and salvation. Any ecstatic states or other unusual phenomena that may occur in the course of hesychast practice are considered secondary and unimportant, even quite dangerous. Moreover, seeking unusual "spiritual" experiences can itself cause great harm, ruining the soul and the mind of the seeker. Such a seeking after "spiritual" experiences can lead to spiritual delusion (Ru. prelest, Gr. plani) – the antonym of sobriety – in which a person believes himself or herself to be a saint, has hallucinations in which he or she "sees" angels, Christ, etc. This state of spiritual delusion is, in a superficial, egotistical way, pleasurable but can lead to madness and suicide, and, according to the hesychast fathers, makes salvation impossible.

=== Liturgy and sacraments ===
Hesychasts fully participate in the liturgical and sacramental life of the Orthodox Church, including the daily cycle of liturgical prayer of the Divine Office and the Divine Liturgy. However, hesychasts who are living as hermits might have a very rare attendance at the Divine Liturgy (see the life of Saint Seraphim of Sarov) and might not recite the Divine Office except by means of the Jesus Prayer (attested practice on Mt Athos). In general, the hesychast restricts his external activities for the sake of his hesychastic practice.

== Texts ==
Books used by hesychasts include the Philokalia, a collection of texts on prayer and solitary mental ascesis written from the 4th to the 15th centuries, which exists in several independent redactions; the Ladder of Divine Ascent; the collected works of St. Symeon the New Theologian (949–1022); and the works of St. Isaac the Syrian (7th century), as they were selected and translated into Greek at the Monastery of St. Savas near Jerusalem about the 10th century.

== External views of hesychasm ==
=== Oriental Orthodox ===
==== Coptic Orthodox ====
Some Coptic Orthodox clerics are "wary of the hesychastic practices of the Jesus Prayer that developed later in the Eastern churches".

Matta el-Meskeen, a Coptic Orthodox hieromonk, commented that hesychasm rid the concept of unceasing prayer from its simplicity, shifting "its ascetical position as a humbling practice by itself to a mystical position, with programs, stipulations, technical and mechanical bases, degrees, objectives, results".

In 2016, Metropolitan Bishoy of Damietta, the head of the theology department in the Institute of Coptic Studies and secretary of the Coptic Orthodox Church Synod from 1985 until 2012 criticized the essence-energy distinction and rejected Palamism.

=== Roman Catholic ===
Western theologians have tended to reject the idea that the distinction between essence and energies is real rather than, albeit with a foundation in reality, notional (in the mind). In their view, affirming an ontological essence–energies distinction in God contradicted the teaching of the First Council of Nicaea on divine unity. (Note: In the Catholic Encyclopedia of 1909, Simon Vailhé rejected Palamas's teachings that humans could achieve a corporal perception of the divinity, and his distinction between God's essence and his energies, as "monstrous errors" and "perilous theological theories". He further characterized the Eastern canonization of Palamas's teachings as a "resurrection of polytheism". Vailhe: "Palamas taught that by asceticism one could attain a corporal, i.e., a sense view, or perception, of the Divinity. He also held that in God there was a real distinction between the Divine Essence and Its attributes, and he identified grace as one of the Divine propria, making it something uncreated and infinite. These monstrous errors were denounced by the Calabrian Barlaam, by Nicephorus Gregoras, and by Acthyndinus. The conflict began in 1338 and ended only in 1368, with the solemn canonization of Palamas and the official recognition of his heresies. He was declared the 'holy doctor' and 'one of the greatest among the Fathers of the Church', and his writings were proclaimed 'the infallible guide of the Christian Faith'. Thirty years of incessant controversy and discordant councils ended with a resurrection of polytheism".) Adrian Fortescue, writing in the Catholic Encyclopedia (1909), claimed that "the real distinction between God's essence and operation remains one more principle, though it is rarely insisted on now, in which the Orthodox differ from Catholics". According to Fortescue, the Scholastic theory that God is pure actuality prevented Palamism from having much influence in the West, and it was from Western Scholasticism that hesychasm's philosophical opponents in the East borrowed their weapons.

In some instances, these theologians equated hesychasm with quietism, an 18th-century mystical revival condemned by the Roman Catholic Church, perhaps because "quietism" is the literal translation of "hesychasm". However, according to Eastern Orthodox bishop and theologian Kallistos Ware, "To translate 'hesychasm' as 'quietism,' while perhaps etymologically defensible, is historically and theologically misleading." Ware asserts that "the distinctive tenets of the 17th-century Western quietists is not characteristic of Greek hesychasm".

The Roman Catholic Church has never expressed any condemnation of Palamism, and uses in its liturgical readings from the work of Nicholas Kabasilas, a supporter of Palamas in the controversy that took place in the East. Its Liturgy of the Hours includes extracts from Kabasilas's Life in Christ on Tuesday, Wednesday, and Thursday of the Fifth Week of Easter in Year II of the two-year cycle for the Office of Readings.

The later 20th century saw a remarkable change in the attitude of Roman Catholic theologians to Palamas, a "rehabilitation" of him that has led to increasing parts of the Western Church considering him a saint, even if uncanonized. Some Western scholars have argued that there is no conflict between Palamas's teaching and Catholic thought. According to Kallistos Ware, some Western theologians, both Roman Catholic and Anglican, see the theology of Palamas as introducing an inadmissible division within God; however, others have incorporated his theology into their own thinking. (Note: For example, G. Philips asserts that the essence-energies distinction as presented by Palamas is "a typical example of a perfectly admissible theological pluralism" that is compatible with the Roman Catholic magisterium. Pope John Paul II repeatedly emphasized his respect for Eastern theology as an enrichment for the whole Church, declaring that, even after the painful division between the Christian East and the See of Rome, that theology has opened up profound thought-provoking perspectives of interest to the entire Catholic Church. He spoke in particular of the hesychast controversy. The term "hesychasm", he said, refers to a practice of prayer marked by deep tranquillity of the spirit intent on contemplating God unceasingly by invoking the name of Jesus. While from a Catholic viewpoint there have been tensions concerning some developments of the practice, the pope said, there is no denying the goodness of the intention that inspired its defence, which was to stress that man is offered the concrete possibility of uniting himself in his inner heart with God in that profound union of grace known as theosis, divinization.)

== See also ==
- Barlaam of Calabria
- Caloyers
- Centering Prayer
- Dhikr
- Eastern Catholic Churches
- Eastern Orthodoxy
- Henosis
- Hesychia
- Imiaslavie
- Japa
- Jesus Prayer
- Lojong
- Mantra
- Maranatha
- Meditation
- Mysticism
- Philokalia
- Poustinia
- Prayer
- Prayer rope
- Pratyahara
- Quiet time
- Quietism
- Tabor Light
- The Way of a Pilgrim
- Theoria
- Theosis

== Sources ==
- Dupuche, John R.; Dunn, Geoffrey D.; Cross, Lawrence (2003). "Sufism and hesychasm". In Bronwen, Neil (ed.). Prayer and spirituality in the early church vol. 3: liturgy and life. Pauls Publications in association with the Centre for Early Christian Studies.
- Palmer, G. E. H.; Ware, Kallistos; Sherrard, Philip (1999). The Philokalia: The Complete Text. Vol. 4. Faber and Faber. ISBN 0-571-19382-X.
- Parry, Ken (1999). The Blackwell Dictionary of Eastern Christianity. Malden, MA: Blackwell Publishing. ISBN 0631232036.
- Payne, Daniel Paul (2006), The Revival of Political Hesychasm in Greek Orthodox Thought: A Study of the Hesychast Basis of the Thought of John S. Romanides and Christos Yannaras (PDF), Baylor, archived (PDF) from the original on 2007-09-26
- Stearn, Rod (2020), "7. Cyril of Scythlopolis", Historiography and Hierotopy, Gorgias Press, pp. 269–324, doi:10.31826/9781463239824-010, ISBN 978-1-4632-3982-4, S2CID 243303600, archived from the original on 2022-05-08
- Ware, Kallistos (1992). "Praying with the body: the hesychast method and non-Christian parallels". Sobornost Incorporating Eastern Churches Review 14:2 (1992) Pp. 6–35. Archived from the original on 2013-01-06.
- Ware, Kallistos (1995). Sahas, Daniel J. (ed.). Act out of Stillness: The Influence of Fourteenth-Century Hesychasm on Byzantine and Slav Civilization. Toronto: The Hellenic Canadian Association of Constantinople and the Thessalonikean Society of Metro Toronto.

Web-sources
