= Barlaam of Seminara =

Italian scholar

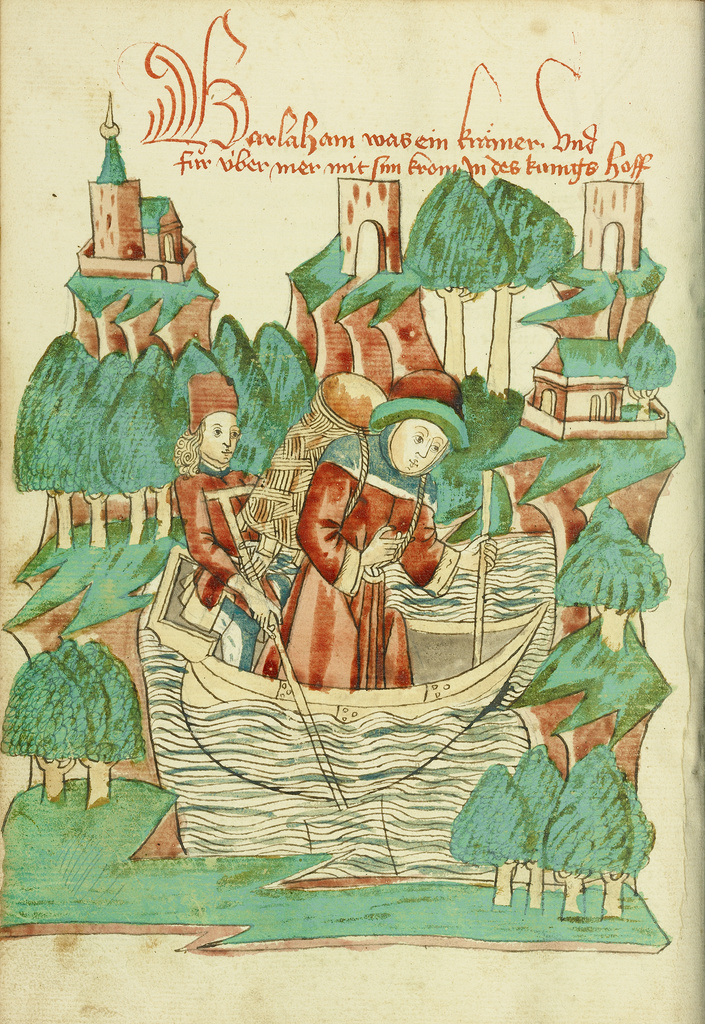
- Barlaam crosses a river, from the workshop of Diebold Lauber (1469)
- Born: 1290; Seminara, Calabria, Kingdom of Naples
- Died: June 1, 1348 (aged 57–58); Gerace, Kingdom of Naples

Academic work
- School or tradition: Barlaamism
- Institutions: University of Constantinople
- Main interests: Philology
- Notable ideas: Rejection of Hesychasm

Barlaam of Seminara (Bernardo Massari, as a layman; c. 1290 – 1348) or Barlaam of Calabria (Greek: Βαρλαὰμ Καλαβρός) was a Basilian monk, theologian and humanistic scholar born in southern Italy. He was a scholar and clergyman of the 14th century, as well as a humanist, philologist and theologian.

When Gregorios Palamas defended Hesychasm (the Eastern Orthodox Church's mystical teaching on prayer), Barlaam accused him of heresy. Three Eastern Orthodox synods ruled against him and in Palamas's favor (two Councils of Sophia in June and August 1341, and a Council of Blachernae in 1351).

== Early life ==
Barlaam was born Bernardo Massari in what is now the comune of Seminara, Calabria, in a Greek-speaking Eastern Orthodox environment. He was an ethnic Greek.

== Early career ==
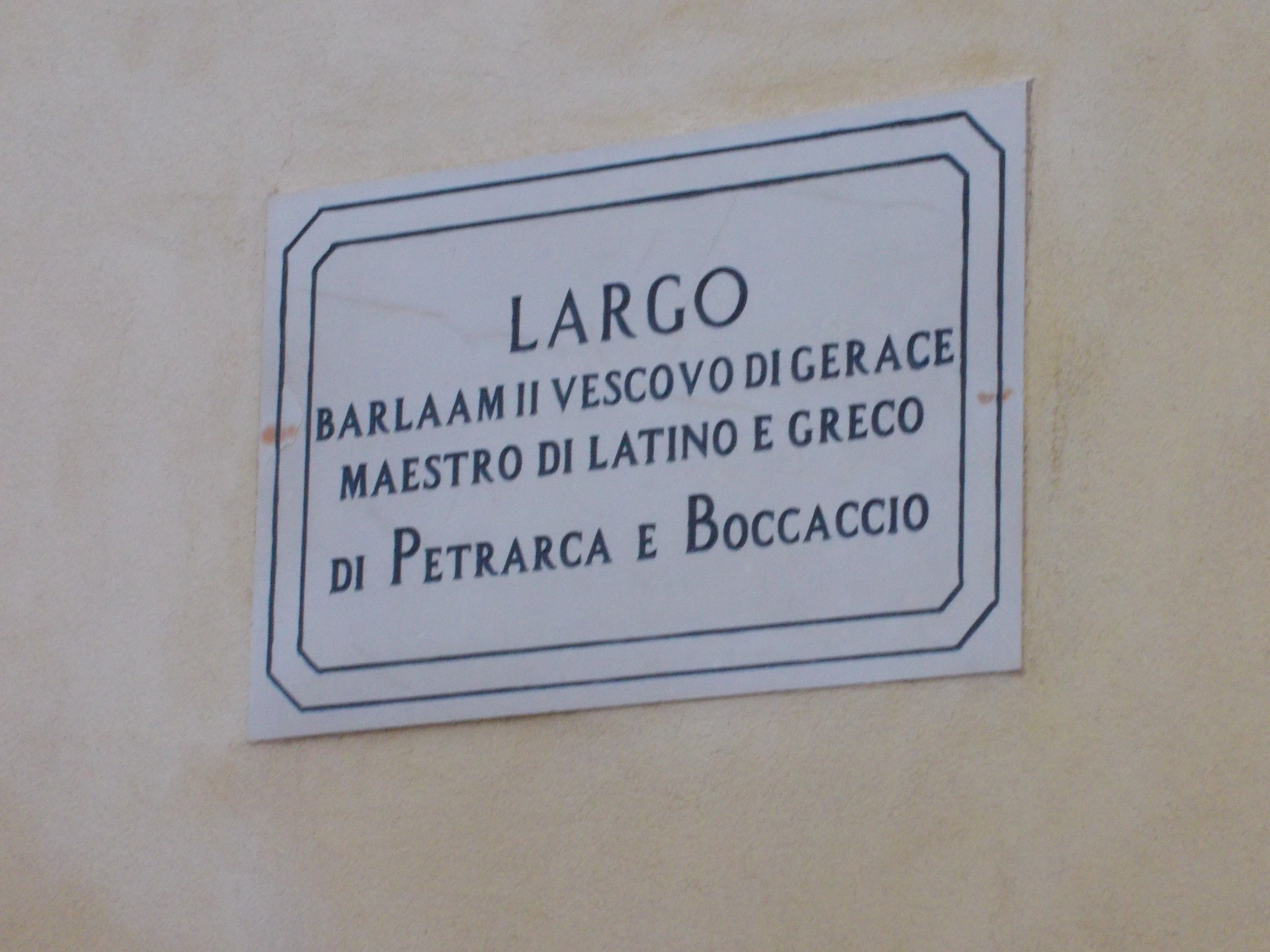
Plaque for Barlaam in Gerace

Bernardo moved to Constantinople in the 1320s, where he soon gained entrance into ecclesiastical and political circles, especially those around the emperor Andronicus III Palaeologus, who gave him a teaching position at the University of Constantinople. He was tonsured a monk at the monastery of Sant'Elia di Capassino and given the name Barlaam.

Eventually, he was made the Hegumen (abbot) of the Monastery of Our Savior, and two confidential missions on behalf of the emperor were entrusted to him.

Historian Colin Wells characterizes Barlaam as "brilliant but sharp-tongued", describing him as "thoroughly versed in the classics, an astronomer, a mathematician, as well as a philosopher and a theologian. However, according to Wells, "this formidable learning was coupled with an arrogant, sarcastic manner, so caustic at times that he put off even friends and allies."

During the years 1333–1334, Barlaam undertook to negotiate with the representatives of Pope John XXII the union of the churches divided by the East–West Schism. For this occasion he wrote twenty-one treatises against the Latins in which he opposed papal primacy and the filioque doctrine. Emperor Andronicus III sent Barlaam on important diplomatic missions to Robert the Wise in Naples and to Philip VI in Paris. In 1339, he was sent to the exiled Pope Benedict XII at Avignon to suggest a crusade against the Turks and to discuss the union of churches, but he was not successful in this endeavour. On this occasion he met Petrarch.

Returning to Constantinople, Barlaam worked on commentaries on Pseudo-Dionysius the Areopagite under the patronage of John VI Kantakouzenos.

=== Early conflict between Barlaam and Palamas ===
Around 1336, Gregory Palamas received copies of treatises written by Barlaam against the Latins, condemning their insertion of the Filioque into the Nicene Creed. Palamas took issue with Barlaam's argument in support of it, since Barlaam declared that efforts at demonstrating the nature of God (specifically, the nature of the Holy Spirit) should be abandoned, because God is ultimately unknowable and undemonstrable to humans. Thus, Barlaam asserted that it was impossible to determine from whom the Holy Spirit proceeds. According to Sara J. Denning-Bolle, Palamas viewed Barlaam's argument as "dangerously agnostic". In his response titled "Apodictic Treatises", Palamas insisted that it was indeed demonstrable that the Holy Spirit proceeded from the Father but not from the Son. A series of letters ensued between the two but they were unable to resolve their differences amicably.

== The Hesychast controversy ==
In contrast to Palamas' teaching that the "glory of God" revealed in various episodes of Jewish and Christian Scripture (e.g., the burning bush seen by Moses, the Light on Mount Tabor at the Transfiguration) was in fact the uncreated Energies of God (i.e., the grace of God), Barlaam held that they were created effects, because no part of God whatsoever could be directly perceived by humans. The Eastern Orthodox interpreted his position as denying the renewing power of the Holy Spirit, which, in the words of various Eastern Orthodox hymns, "made apostles out of fishermen" (i.e., makes saints even out of uneducated people). In his anti-hesychastic works Barlaam held that knowledge of worldly wisdom was necessary for the perfection of the monks and denied the possibility of the vision of the divine life.

=== Barlaam's attack on Hesychasm ===
Steven Runciman reports that, infuriated by Palamas' attacks against him, Barlaam vowed to humiliate Palamas by attacking the Hesychast teaching for which Palamas had become the chief proponent. Barlaam visited Thessalonica, where he made the acquaintance of monks who followed the Hesychast teachings. Runciman describes these monks as ignorant and lacking a real understanding of the Hesychast teaching. Barlaam issued a number of treatises mocking the absurdity of the practices which he reported included, "miraculous separations and reunions of the spirit and the soul, of the traffic which demons have with the soul, of the difference between red lights and white lights, of the entry and departure of the intelligence through the nostrils with the breath, of the shields that gather together round the navel, and finally of the union of Our Lord with the soul, which takes place in the full and sensible certitude of the heart within the navel." Barlaam said that the monks had claimed to see the divine essence with bodily eyes, which he viewed as sheer Messalianism. When asked about the light which they saw, the monks told him that it was neither of the superessential Essence nor an angelic essence nor the Spirit itself, but that the spirit contemplated it as another hypostasis. Barlaam commented snidely, "I must confess that I do not know what this light is. I only know that it does not exist."

According to Runciman, Barlaam's attack struck home. He had shown that, in the hands of monks who were inadequately instructed and ignorant of the true Hesychast teaching, the psycho-physical precepts of Hesychasm could produce "dangerous and ridiculous results". To many of the Byzantine intellectuals, Hesychasm appeared "shockingly anti-intellectual" Barlaam nicknamed the Hesychasts "Omphaloscopoi" (the navel-gazers); the nickname has coloured the tone of most subsequent Western writing about the Byzantine mystics. However, Barlaam's triumph was short-lived. Ultimately, the Byzantines had a deep respect for mysticism even if they didn't understand it. And, in Palamas, Barlaam found an opponent who was more than his equal in knowledge, intellect and expository skills.

=== The Triads ===
In response to Barlaam's attacks, Palamas wrote nine treatises entitled "Triads For The Defense of Those Who Practice Sacred Hesychasm". The treatises are called "Triads" because they were organized as three sets of three treatises.

The Triads were written in three stages. The first triad was written in the second half of the 1330s and are based on personal discussions between Palamas and Barlaam although Barlaam is never mentioned by name.

Gregory's teaching was affirmed by the superiors and principal monks of Mt. Athos, who met in synod during 1340–1. In early 1341, the monastic communities of Mount Athos wrote the Hagioritic Tome under the supervision and inspiration of Palamas. Although the Tome does not mention Barlaam by name, the work clearly takes aim at Barlaam's views. The Tome provides a systematic presentation of Palamas' teaching and became the fundamental textbook for Byzantine mysticism.

Barlaam also took exception to the doctrine held by the Hesychasts as to the uncreated nature of the light, the experience of which was said to be the goal of Hesychast practice, regarding it as heretical and blasphemous. It was maintained by the Hesychasts to be of divine origin and to be identical to the light which had been manifested to Jesus' disciples on Mount Tabor at the Transfiguration. Barlaam viewed this doctrine of "uncreated light" to be polytheistic because as it postulated two eternal substances, a visible and an invisible God. Barlaam accuses the use of the Jesus Prayer as being a practice of Bogomilism.

The second triad quotes some of Barlaam's writings directly. In response to this second triad, Barlaam composed the treatise "Against the Messalians" linking the hesychasts to the Messalians and thereby accusing them of heresy. In "Against the Messalians", Barlaam attacked Gregory by name for the first time. Barlaam derisively called the Hesychasts omphalopsychoi (men with their souls in their navels) and accused them of the heresy of Messalianism, also known as Bogomilism in the East. According to Meyendorff, Barlaam viewed "any claim of real and conscious experience of God as Messalianism".

In the third Triad, Palamas refuted Barlaam's charge of Messalianism by demonstrating that the Hesychasts did not share the antisacramentalism of the Messalians nor did they claim to physically see the essence of God with their eyes. According to John Meyendorff, "Gregory Palamas orients his entire polemic against Barlaam the Calabrian on the issue of the Hellenic wisdom which he considers to be the main source of Barlaam’s errors."

=== Hesychast councils at Constantinople ===
It became clear that the dispute between Barlaam and Palamas was irreconcilable and would require the judgment of an episcopal council. A series of six patriarchal councils was held in Constantinople on 10 June 1341, August 1341, 4 November 1344, 1 February 1347, 8 February 1347, and 28 May 1351 to consider the issues.

The dispute over Hesychasm came before a synod held at Constantinople in May 1341 and presided over by the emperor Andronicus III. The assembly, influenced by the veneration in which the writings of Pseudo-Dionysius were held in the Eastern Church, condemned Barlaam, who recanted. The ecumenical patriarch insisted that all of Barlaam's writings be destroyed and thus no complete copies of Barlaam's treatise "Against Messalianism" have survived.

Barlaam's primary supporter Emperor Andronicus III died just five days after the synod ended. Although Barlaam initially hoped for a second chance to present his case against Palamas, he soon realised the futility of pursuing his cause, and left for Calabria where he converted to the Latin Church and was appointed Bishop of Gerace.

== Later career ==
After leaving Constantinople, Barlaam was received into the Latin Church at Avignon in 1342 and was consecrated Bishop of Gerace.

In 1346, he was appointed Papal Ambassador to Constantinople but, his mission having ended in failure, he returned to Gerace where he died in 1348.

== Legacy ==
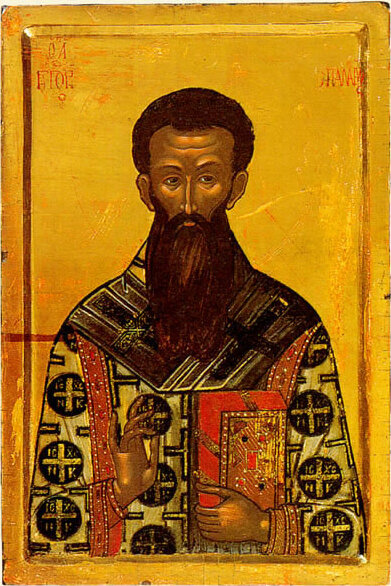
Gregory Palamas, with whom Barlaam engaged in his most famous theological controversy.

Barlaam, by his upbringing and philosophy, spanned the gap between the Christian East and West. Though he was never able to synthesize both traditions in a satisfactory manner, he did end up influencing both. The Zealots of Thessalonica were influenced by Barlaam's teachings, and his arguments affected the dogmatic definition of Hesychasm in the Eastern Church. A master of the Greek language, he taught Petrarch some rudiments of Greek.

Critics see Barlaam's elevation of philosophy above theology as being the reason for his condemnation by the Eastern Church:

Barlaam overestimated the significance of philosophy for theology, asserting that only through philosophy could humanity arrive at perfection. He thus denied the renewing power of the Holy Spirit, which makes saints even out of uneducated people, as it made the fishermen apostles. Being a humanist, Barlaam placed emphasis on created means of salvation (e.g., philosophy and knowledge) and reduced the role of the grace of the Holy Spirit.

According to Fr. John Meyendorff, "Gregory Palamas orients his entire polemic against Barlaam the Calabrian on the issue of the 'Hellenic wisdom' which he considers to be the main source of Barlaam’s errors." To this day, the issues which Barlaam raised are treated by Eastern Orthodox theologians:

Barlaam's views – that we cannot really know Who the Holy Spirit is exactly (an outgrowth of which is agnosticism), that the ancient Greek philosophers are superior to the Prophets and the Apostles (since reason is above the vision of the Apostles), that the light of the Transfiguration is something which is created and can be undone, that the hesychastic way of life (i.e. the purification of the heart and the unceasing noetic prayer) is not essential – are views which express a supra-scholastic and, subsequently, a secularised point of view of theology. Saint Gregory Palamas foresaw the danger that these views held for Orthodoxy and through the power and energy of the Most Holy Spirit and the experience which he himself had acquired as a successor to the Holy Fathers, he confronted this great danger and preserved unadulterated the Orthodox Faith and Tradition.

== See also ==
- Byzantine scholars in the Renaissance
- Essence–energies distinction
- Gregory Acindynus
- Light of Tabor

== Bibliography ==
Works by Barlaam

- Giannelli, Ciro. "Un progetto di Barlaam per l'unione delle chiese." In Miscellanea Giovanni Mercati, vol. 3, "Studi e Testi," no. 123. Vatican City, 1946. See pages 157–208 for excerpts from his writings.
- Migne, J.-P., ed. Patrologia Graeca, vol. 151. Paris, 1857. Includes excerpts from the Discourse to Pope Benedict XII and the Advisory Discourse.
- Schiro, Giuseppe, ed. Barlaam Calabro: Epistole greche. Palermo, 1954
- John Chamber, Barlaam monachi logistice (1600), a critical translation of the Logistica

Works About Barlaam

- Christou, Panagiotis C. "Barlaam." In Threskeutikē kai ēthikē enkuklopaideia, vol. 3, cols. 624–627. Athens, 1963.
- Demetracopoulos, John A. (2019). "Barlaam von Kalabrien". In: Brungs, Alexander; Kapriev, Georgi; Mudroch, Vilem (eds). Die Philosophie des Mittelalters 1: Byzanz, Judentum [The Philosophy of the Middle Ages 1: Byzantium, Judaism]. Grundriss der Geschichte der Philosophie, new edition. Basel: Schwabe, ISBN 978-3-7965-2623-7, pp. 127–133.
- Jugie, Martin. "Barlaam de Seminara." In Dictionnaire d'histoire et de géographie ecclésiastiques, vol. 6, cols. 817–834. Paris, 1932.
- Meyendorff, John. "Un mauvais théologien de l'unité au quatorzième siècle: Barlaam le Calabrais." In L'église et les églises, 1054–1954, vol. 2, pp. 47–65. Chevetogne, 1955.
- "Barlaam the Calabrian" from Science and Its Times. Thomson Gale, 2005–2006.
