= Patrologia Graeca =

Collection of writings by Greek Christian authors (1857–1866)

The Patrologia Graeca (PG, or Patrologiae Cursus Completus, Series Graeca) is an edited collection of writings by the Church Fathers and various secular writers, in the Greek language. It consists of 161 volumes published in 1857–1866 by Jacques Paul Migne's Imprimerie Catholique, in Paris.

== Description ==
The Patrologia Graeca is an edited collection of writings by the Church Fathers and various secular writers, in the Greek language. It consists of 161 volumes produced in 1857–1866 by J. P. Migne's Imprimerie Catholique, Paris. It includes both the Eastern Fathers and those Western authors who wrote before Latin became predominant in the Western Church in the 3rd century, e.g. the early writings collectively known as the Apostolic Fathers, such as the First and Second Epistle of Clement, the Shepherd of Hermas, Eusebius, Origen, and the Cappadocian Fathers Basil the Great, Gregory of Nazianzus, and Gregory of Nyssa.

The 161 volumes are bound as 166 (vols. 16 and 87 being in three parts and vol. 86 in two). An important final volume, which included some supplements and a full index, was never published, as the plates were destroyed in a fire (1868) at the printer.

The first series contained only Latin translations of the originals (81 vols., 1856-61). The second series contains the Greek text with a Latin translation (166 vols., 1857-66). The texts are interlaced, with one column of Greek and a corresponding column on the other side of the page that is the Latin translation. Where the Greek original has been lost, as in the case of Irenaeus, the extant Greek fragments are interspersed throughout the Latin text. In one instance, the original is preserved in Syriac only and translated into Latin. Quite often, information about the author is provided, also in Latin.

A Greek, D. Scholarios, added a half-published list of the authors and subjects, (Athens, 1879) and began a complete table of contents (Athens, 1883). In 1912, Garnier Frères, Paris, published a Patrologia Graeca index volume, edited by Ferdinand Cavallera.

== List of volumes ==
As with the Patrologia Latina, the authors are (with a few exceptions) in chronological order, spanning the period from the earliest Christian writers to the Fall of Constantinople.

=== Pre-Nicaean ===
- PG 1: Clement of Rome
- PG 2: Clement of Rome, Epistle of Barnabas, Hermas, Epistle to Diognetus, Anonymous Testaments of the 12 Patriarchs
- PG 3-4: Pseudo-Dionysius the Areopagite (5th to 6th centuries), Maximus the Confessor (7th century) commentary on Pseudo-Dionysius, George Pachymeres (14th century) commentary on Pseudo-Dionysius
- PG 5: Ignatius of Antioch, Polycarp, Melito of Sardis, Papias of Hierapolis, Apollonius of Ephesus, etc.
- PG 6: Justin Martyr, Tatian, Athenagoras of Athens, Theophilus of Antioch, Hermias philosophus
- PG 7: Irenaeus
- PG 8-9: Clement of Alexandria
- PG 10: Gregory Thaumaturgus, Pope Zephyrinus, Sextus Julius Africanus, Pope Urban I, Hippolytus of Rome, Theognostus of Alexandria, etc.
- PG 11-17: Origen
- PG 18: Methodius of Olympus, Alexander of Lycopolis, Peter of Alexandria, Theodore of Heraclea, etc.

=== 4th century ===
- PG 19-24: Eusebius of Caesarea
- PG 25-28: Athanasius
- PG 29-32: Basil the Great
- PG 33: Cyril of Jerusalem, Apollinaris of Laodicea, Diodorus of Tarsus, Peter II Bishop of Alexandria, Timotheus Bishop of Alexandria, Isaac the ex-Jew
- PG 34: Macarius of Egypt and Macarius of Alexandria
- PG 35-37: Gregory of Nazianzus, Basil (the Minor) Bishop of Caesarea (10th century)
- PG 38: Gregory of Nazianzus, Caesarius
- PG 39: Didymus the Blind, Amphilochius Iconiensis, Nectarius
- PG 40: Egyptian Fathers: St Anthony Abbot, Pachomius, Serapion, Bishop of Thmuis, Isaias the Abbot, Orsisius, Theodorus the Abbot. Other: Asterius bishop of Amaseia, Nemesius, Hieronymus Theologus Græcus, Serapion of Antioch, Philo Bishop of Karpasia, Evagrius Ponticus
- PG 41-42: Epiphanius
- PG 43: Epiphanius, Nonnus of Panopolis
- PG 44-46: Gregory of Nyssa

=== 5th century ===
- PG 47-64: John Chrysostom
- PG 65: Severian of Gabala, Theophilus of Alexandria, Palladius Bishop of Helenopolis, Philostorgius, Archbishop Atticus of Constantinople, Proclus of Constantinople, Archbishop Flavian of Constantinople, Marcus Eremita, Marcus Diadochus, Marcus Diaconus
- PG 66: Theodore of Mopsuestia, Synesius, Arsenius the Great
- PG 67: Socrates Scholasticus and Sozomenus
- PG 68-76: Cyril of Alexandria
- PG 77: Cyril of Alexandria, Theodotus of Ancyra, Paul Bishop of Emesa, Acacius of Beroea, John of Antioch, Memnon Bishop of Ephesus, Acacius Bishop of Melitene, Rabbulas Bishop of Edessa, Firmus bishop of Caesarea, Amphilochius of Sida
- PG 78: Isidore of Pelusium
- PG 79: Nilus of Sinai, Hyperechios
- PG 80-84: Theodoretus of Cyrus
- PG 85: Basil of Seleucia, Euthalius Deacon of Alexandria, John of Karpathos, Aeneas of Gaza, Zacharias Rhetor Bishop of Mytilene, Gelasius of Cyzicus, Theotimus, Ammonius, Andreas Bishop of Samosata, Gennadius of Constantinople, Candidus Isaurus, Antipater of Bostra, Dalmatius Bishop of Cyzicus, Timothy Bishop of Berytus, Eustathius Bishop of Berytus.

=== 6th century ===
- PG 86a: Presbyter Timothy of Constantinople, Joannes Maxentius, Theodorus Lector, Procopius Deacon of Tyre, Theodorus Bishop of Scythopolis, Presbyter Timothy of Jerusalem, Theodosius I of Alexandria, Eusebius of Alexandria, Eusebius of Emesa, Gregentius of Taphar, Patriarch Epiphanius of Constantinople, Isaac of Nineveh, Barsanuphius of Palestine, Eustathius monk, Emperor Justinian, Agapetus the Deacon, Leontius Byzantinus
- PG 86b: Leontius Byzantinus (continuation), Patriarch Ephraim of Antioch, Paulus Silentiarius, Patriarch Eutychius of Constantinople, Evagrius Scholasticus, Eulogius of Alexandria, Simeon Stylites the Younger, Patriarch Zacharias of Jerusalem, Patriarch Modestus of Jerusalem, Anonymous on the siege of Jerusalem by the Persians, Jobius, Erechthius Bishop of Antioch in Pisidia, Peter Bishop of Laodicea.

=== 7th century ===
- PG 87a-87b: Procopius of Gaza
- PG 87c: Procopius of Gaza, John Moschus (Spiritual Meadow), Sophronius, Alexander monk
- PG 88: Cosmas Indicopleustes, Constantine the Deacon, Joannes Climacus, Agathias Myrinæ, Gregory Bishop of Antioch, Joannes Jejunator (Patriarch John IV of Constantinople), Dorotheus the Archimandrite
- PG 89: Anastasius Sinaita, Anastasius of Antioch, Anastasius (abbot of Euthymius), Anastasius IV Patriarch of Antioch, Antiochus of Sabe
- PG 90: Maximus the Abbot
- PG 91: Maximus the Confessor, Thalassius the Abbot, Theodore of Raithu
- PG 92: Paschal Chronicle, George Pisides
- PG 93: Olympiodorus Deacon of Alexandria, Hesychius, Leontius Bishop of Neapolis in Cyprus, Leontius of Damascus

=== 8th century ===
- PG 94-95: John of Damascus
- PG 96: John of Damascus, John of Nicæa, Patriarch John VI of Constantinople, Joannes of Eubœa
- PG 97: John Malalas (6th century), Andrew of Crete, Elias of Crete and Theodore Abucara
- PG 98: Patriarch Germanus I of Constantinople, Cosmas of Jerusalem, Gregory of Agrigento, Anonymus Becuccianus, Pantaleon Deacon of Constantinople, Adrian monk, Epiphanius Deacon of Catania, Pachomius monk, Philotheus monk, Patriarch Tarasios of Constantinople
- PG 99: Theodore of Studion

=== 9th century ===
- PG 100: Patriarch Nikephoros I of Constantinople, Stephen Deacon of Constantinople, Gregory of Decapolis, Patriarch Christopher I of Alexandria, Patriarch Methodios I of Constantinople
- PG 101-103: Photius of Constantinople
- PG 104: Photius of Constantinople, Petrus Siculus, Peter bishop of Argos (Saint Peter the Wonderworker), Bartholomew of Edessa
- PG 105: Nicetas ('David') of Paphlagonia, Nicetas Byzantius, Theognostus monk, Anonymous, Joseph the Hymnographer

=== 10th century ===
- PG 106: Joseppus, Nicephorus the Philosopher, Andreas of Caesarea (Cappadocia), Arethas of Caesarea in Cappadocia, John Geometres, Cosmas Vestitor, Leo the Patrician, Athanasius Bishop of Corinth, anonymous small Greek works
- PG 107: Emperor Leo VI the Wise
- PG 108: Theophanes Abbot and Confessor, Unknown Author, Leo Grammaticus, Anastasius the Historian and Church Librarian
- PG 109: Scriptores post Theophanem (Theophanes Continuatus) (edition of Combefisius)
- PG 110: Georgius Monachus
- PG 111: Nicholas Patriarch of Constantinople, Basil Bishop of Neai Patrai, Basil (the Minor) Bishop of Caesarea, Gregory Presbyter of Caesarea, Joseph Genesius, Moses son of Cepha in Syria, Theodorus Daphnopata, Nicephorus Presbyter of Constantinople, Patriarch Eutychius of Alexandria, Georgius Monachus
- PG 112: Constantine Porphyrogenitus
- PG 113: Constantine Porphyrogenitus (De Thematibus Orientis et Occidentis Libri Duo , Liber de Adminstrando Imperio , Delectus Legum Compendiarius Leonis et Constantini , Constantini Porphyrogeniti Novelle Constitutiones , Excerpta de Legationibus), Nicon monk in Crete, Theodosius the Deacon
- PG 114-116: Symeon Metaphrastes
- PG 117: Emperor Basil II, Emperor Nikephoros II, Leon Diaconus, Hyppolitus of Thebes, Joannes Georgides monk, Ignatius the Deacon, Nilus the Eparch, Christophorous Protoasecretis, Michael Hamartolus, Anonymus, Suidas
- PG 118: Pseudo-Oecumenius
- PG 119: Pseudo-Oecumenius, various writers (patriarchs, bishops, other) on Jus Canonicum Græco-Romanum

=== 11th century ===
- PG 120: Anonymous on the Life of Nilus the Younger, Theodorus Bishop of Iconium, Leo Presbyter, Leo Grammaticus, Joannes Presbyter, Epiphanius of Jerusalem monk, Patriarch Alexius of Constantinople, Demetrius Syncellus Bishop of Cyzicus, Nicetas Chartophylax of Nicaea, Patriarch Michael Cerularius of Constantinople, Samonas Bishop of Gaza, Leo of Ohrid Archbishop of Bulgaria, Nicetas Pectoratus (Stethatos) presbyter and monk of Monastery of Stoudios, Joannes Bishop of Euchaita, Patriarch Joannes Xiphilinus of Constantinople, Joannes Deacon of Constantinople, Symeon the Younger
- PG 121-122: Georgius Cedrenus
- PG 123-126: Theophylactus Bulgarias

=== 12th century ===
Note: Vol. 127 actually spans the 11th to 12th centuries.

- PG 127: Nicephorus Bryennius, Constantinus Manasses, Patriarch Nicholas III of Constantinople, Luce VII Abbot of Grottaferrata, Nicon monk in Raithu, Anastasius Archbishop of Caesarea, Nicetas Serronius, Jacobus monk in Coccinobaphi, Philippus Solitarius, Job the monk, Petrus Chrysolanus Mediolanensis Archiepiscopus, Irene Augusta, Emperor Nicephoros III Botaneiates, Nicetas of Side
- PG 128-130: Euthymius Zigabenus
- PG 131: Euthymius Zigabenus, Anna Comnena Porphyrogenita Cæsarissa
- PG 132: Theophanes Kerameus, Nilus Doxapatris, John Bishop of Antioch, Emperor John II Komnenos, Isaac Catholicus of Magnæ Armeniæ
- PG 133: Arsenius monk in Philotheou monastery, Alexius Aristenus, Patriarch Lucas Chrysoberges of Constantinople, Theorianus Philosophus, Joannes Cinnamus, Manuel Comnenus, Emperor Alexius I Comnenus, Emperor Andronicus Comnenus, Theodorus Prodromus
- PG 134: Joannes Zonaras
- PG 135: Joannes Zonaras, Patriarch Georgius Xiphilinus of Constantinople, Emperor Isaac II Angelos, Neophytus Presbyter, Joannes Chilas Metropolite of Ephesus, Nicolaus Metropolite of Methone, Eustathius of Thessalonica
- PG 136: Eustathius of Thessalonica, Antonius Melissa

=== 13th century ===
- PG 137-138: Theodorus Balsamon
- PG 139: Isidorus Metropolite of Thessalonica, Nicetas of Maroneia Metropolite of Thessalonica, Joannes Bishop of Citrus (Pydna), Patriarch Marcus of Alexandria, Joel the Chonographer, Nicetas Choniates
- PG 140: Nicetas Choniates, Anonymus Greek, Michael Acominatus Archbishop of Athens, Theodorus Bishop of Alania, Theodorus bishop of (S)Andide, Manuel Magnus Rhetor of Constantinople, Pantaleo Deacon of Constantinople, Manuel Charitopulus, Patriarch Germanus II of Constantinople, Michael Chumnus Metropolite of Thessalonica, Emperor Theodore I Laskaris, Methodius monk, Patriarch Nicephorus II of Constantinople, Constantine Acropolita, Arsenius Autorianus (Patriarch Arsenius I of Constantinople), Georgius Acropolita, Nicephorus Chumnus, Alexander IV, Sixtus IV
- PG 141: Joannes Veccus, Constantine Meliteniotes, Georgius Metochita
- PG 142: Georgius Cyprus, Athanasius Patriarch of Constantinople, Nicephorus Blemmida

=== 14th century ===
- PG 143: Ephraemius Chronographus, Theoleptus Metropolite of Philadelphia, George Pachymeres
- PG 144: George Pachymeres, Theodore Metochites, Matthew Blastares
- PG 145: Matthew Blastares, Theodulus monk alias Thomas Magister, Nicephorus Callistus Xanthopoulos
- PG 146: Nicephorus Callistus Xanthopoulos
- PG 147: Nicephorus Callistus Xanthopoulos, Callistus and Ignatius Xanthopuli monks, Patriarch Callistus of Constantinople, Callistus Telicoudes, Callistus Cataphugiota, Nicephorus monk, Maximus Planudes
- PG 148: Nicephorus Gregoras
- PG 149: Nicephorus Gregoras, Nilus Cabasilas Metropolite of Thessalonica, Theodorus of Melitene Magnæ Ecclesiæ Sakellarios, Georgius Lapitha the Cypriot
- PG 150: Constantine Harmenopulus, Macarius Chrysocephalus Metropolite of Philadelphia, Joannes Caleca, Theophanes Archbishop of Nicæa, Nicolaus Cabasilas, Gregorius Palamas
- PG 151: Gregorius Palamas, Gregorius Acindynus, Barlaam of Seminara (Calabria)
- PG 152: Manuel Calecas, Joannes Cyparissiotes, Emperor Matthew Kantakouzenos, Synodical and Patriarchical canons and legislations of various Patriarchs of Constantinople (Joannes Glycys (or Glycas), Isaias, Joannes Caleca, Isidorus, Callistus, Philotheus)
- PG 153: John Cantacuzenus
- PG 154: John Cantacuzenus; Philotheus, Archbishop of Selymbria; Demetrius Cydones; Maximus Chrysoberges, monk

=== 15th century ===
- PG 155: Symeon Archbishop of Thessalonica
- PG 156: Manuel Chrysoloras, Joannes Cananus, Manuel II Palaeologus, Joannes Anagnosta, George Sphrantzes
- PG 157: Georgius Codinus Curopalates, Ducas the historian
- PG 158: Michael Glycas, Joannes Deacon of Adrianople, Isaias of Cyprus, Hilarion monk, John Argyropoulos, Patriarch Joseph II of Constantinople, Job monk, Bartholomæus de Jano Ord. Minorum, Nicolaus Barbarus Patricius Venetus, Anonymus on the life of Mehmed II
- PG 159: Laonicus Chalcondyles of Athens, Leonardus Chiensis Archbishop of Mitylene, Isidore of Thessalonica, Josephus Bishop of Methone
- PG 160: Patriarch Gregory III Mammas of Constantinople, Patriarch Gennadios II of Constantinople, Georgius Gemistus Plethon, Matthæus Camariota, Marcus Eugenicus Metropolite of Ephesus, pope Nicholas V
- PG 161: Bessarion, George of Trebizond, Constantinus Lascaris, Theodorus Gaza, Andronicus Callistus

== Republication ==
A new edition has been prepared by the Centre for Patristic Studies, Athens (Κέντρο Πατερικών Εκδόσεων). It comprises additional supplements: introductions, bibliographies, biographical summaries, detailed tables of contents and hagiographic passages.

== See also ==
- Patrologia Latina – writings in Latin (221 volumes).
- Patrologia Orientalis, which includes writings by Greek and eastern Church Fathers composed or transmitted in Syriac, Coptic, Armenian, Ethiopic, Georgian, Old Church Slavonic and Arabic. It was begun after Migne's death.
