= Nicholas Kabasilas =

Byzantine Saint and mystic

Saint Nicholas Kabasilas
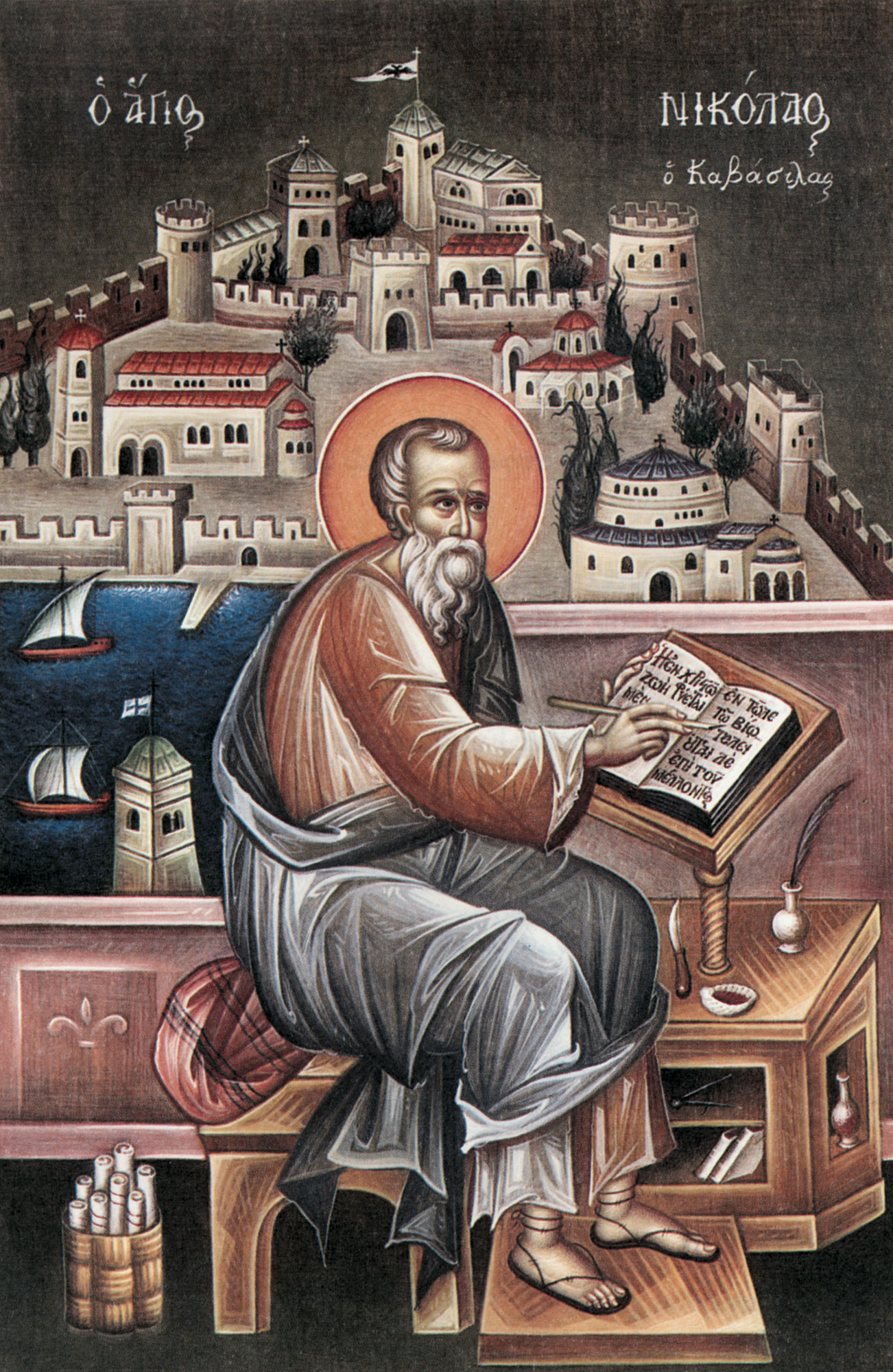
- Icon of Nicholas Cabasilas
- Born: c. 1319; Thessaloniki, Byzantine Empire
- Died: c. 1392
- Venerated in: Eastern Orthodox Church; Eastern Catholic Churches (Note: Greek Byzantine Catholic Church, and Melkite Greek Catholic Church)
- Feast: 20 June

Nicholas Kabasilas or Cabasilas (Greek: Νικόλαος Καβάσιλας; c. 1319/1323 – c. 1392) was a Byzantine theological writer and mystic.

Cabasilas is revered as a saint within the Eastern Orthodox Church. His feast day is 20 June. The Catholic Church uses extracts from his Life in Christ as readings in the Liturgy of the Hours (Tuesday, Wednesday, and Thursday of the Fifth Week of Easter in Year II of the provisional two-year cycle for the Office of Readings).

He is known for his two most famous texts, Life in Christ and Commentary on the Divine Liturgy.

== Life ==
Little of his life is known with certainty, including the dates of his birth and death.

Cabasilas was the nephew of theologian and clergyman Neilos Kabasilas.

He was on intimate terms with the emperor John VI Kantakouzenos, whom he accompanied in his retirement to a monastery. He was once thought to have succeeded his uncle Neilos Kabasilas as archbishop of Thessalonica; however, contemporary records of that see do not show Nicholas as serving as archbishop. It is more likely that he served as a priest at the Mangana Monastery in Constantinople.

In the Hesychast controversy he supported the monks of Mount Athos and Gregory Palamas.

== Work ==
His chief work is Περὶ τῆς ἐν Χριστῷ ζωῆς ("On the Life in Christ"), in which he teaches that union with Christ is achieved through the three great mysteries of baptism, chrismation, and the Eucharist. Cabasilas's Commentary on the Divine Liturgy displays a profound understanding of the sacramental and liturgical life of the Eastern Orthodox Church. He also wrote homilies on various subjects and a speech against usurers, printed with other works by Jacques Paul Migne in Patrologia Graeca. He also wrote an encomium on the ninth-century nun and saint Theodora of Thessaloniki. A large number of his works survive in manuscript form.

== Legacy ==
He was canonized in the Eastern Orthodox Church in 1983, with his feast day set on 20 June.

== Bibliography ==
- Cabasilas, N. (1960). Commentary on the Divine Liturgy. Translated by Hussey, J. M.; McNulty, P. A. St. Vladimir's Seminary Press. ISBN 0-913836-37-0.
- Cabasilas, N. (1974). The Life in Christ. St. Vladimir's Seminary Press. ISBN 0-913836-12-5.

== See also ==
- Orthodox views of the Immaculate Conception dogma

== Sources ==
- Krumbacher, Karl (1897). Geschichte der byzantinischen Litteratur. Munich, Germany: C. H. Beck.
- Herzog, Johann Jakob; Hauck, Albert, eds. (1901). Realencyklopädie für Protestantische Theologie und Kirche. Leipzig, Germany: J. C. Hinrichs.
- Parry, Ken; Melling, David, eds. (1999). The Blackwell Dictionary of Eastern Christianity. Malden, MA: Blackwell Publishing. ISBN 0-631-23203-6.
