= Hesychast controversy =

14th-century theological dispute in the Byzantine Empire

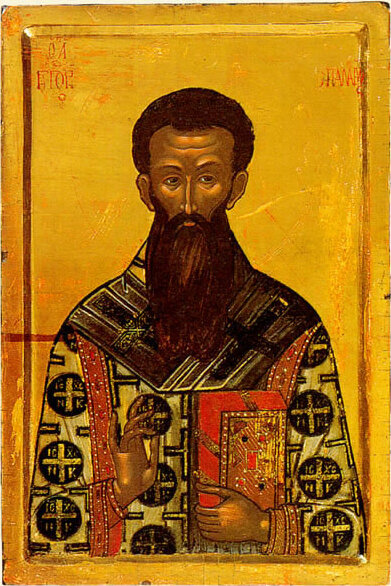
Gregory Palamas

The hesychast controversy was a theological dispute in the Byzantine Empire during the 14th century between supporters and opponents of Gregory Palamas. While not a primary driver of the Byzantine Civil War of 1341, it influenced and was influenced by the political forces in play during that war. The dispute concluded with the victory of the Palamists and the inclusion of Palamite doctrine as part of the dogma of the Eastern Orthodox Church as well as the canonization of Palamas.

About the year 1337, hesychasm attracted the attention of a learned member of the Orthodox Church, Barlaam, a Calabrian monk who had come to Constantinople some seven years earlier. Reacting to criticisms of his theological writings that Gregory Palamas, an Athonite monk and exponent of hesychasm, had courteously communicated to him, Barlaam encountered hesychasts and heard descriptions of their practices. Trained in Western Scholastic theology, Barlaam was scandalized by the descriptions that he heard and wrote several treatises ridiculing the practices. Barlaam took exception to, as heretical and blasphemous, the doctrine entertained by the hesychasts as to the nature of the uncreated light, identical to that light which had been manifested to Jesus' disciples at the Transfiguration on Mount Tabor, the experience of which was said to be the goal of hesychast practice. His informants said that this light was not of the divine essence but was contemplated as another hypostasis. Barlaam held the concept to be polytheistic, inasmuch as it postulated two eternal beings, a visible (immanent) and an invisible (transcendent) God. He accused hesychasm to be a variant of Bogomilism.

Gregory Palamas, afterwards Archbishop of Thessalonica, was asked by his fellow monks on Mt Athos to defend hesychasm from Barlaam's attacks. Well-educated in Greek philosophy (dialectical method) and thus able to defend hesychasm with methods in use also in the West, Palamas defended hesychasm in the 1340s at a series of synods in Constantinople, and wrote a number of works in its defense.

In 1341, the dispute came before a synod held at Constantinople, which, taking into account the regard in which the writings of the pseudo-Dionysius were held, condemned Barlaam, who recanted and almost immediately returned to Calabria, afterwards becoming bishop of a Byzantine Rite diocese in communion with the Pope. Five other synods on the subject were held, at the third of which the opponents of Palamas gained a brief victory. However, in 1351, at a synod under the presidency of Emperor John VI Kantakouzenos, Palamas' real Essence-Energies distinction was established as the doctrine of the Orthodox Church.

Gregory Akindynos, who had been a disciple of Gregory and had tried to mediate between him and Barlaam, became critical of Palamas after Barlaam's departure in 1341. Another opponent of Palamism was Manuel Kalekas who sought to reconcile the Eastern and Western Churches. After the decision of 1351, there was strong repression against anti-Palamist thinkers. Kalekas reports on the repression as late as 1397, and for theologians in disagreement with Palamas, there was ultimately no choice but to emigrate and convert to union with the Latin Church, a path taken by Kalekas as well as Demetrios Kydones and John Kyparissiotes.

== Background ==
=== Monasticism and hesychasm ===
Hesychasm is a form of constant purposeful prayer or experiential prayer that, from at latest the 13th century, took the form of "a particular psychosomatic technique in combination with the Jesus Prayer". Even before the adoption of that technique, hesychasm, as "the practice of inner prayer, aiming at union with God on a level beyond images, concepts and language", with or without use of the Jesus Prayer can be traced back much earlier.

This form of contemplation by focusing the mind on God and praying to God unceasingly looks for its inspiration to the Bible, Matthew 6:6 (the pure of heart will see God), and to the compilation Philokalia. The tradition of contemplation with inner silence or tranquility, having its roots in the Egyptian traditions of monasticism exemplified by such monastics as St Anthony of Egypt, is shared by Christian ascetics.

In the early 14th century, Gregory Sinaita learned from Arsenius of Crete the form of hesychasm that is "a particular psychosomatic technique in combination with the Jesus Prayer" and spread the doctrine, bringing it to the monks on Mount Athos. These stated that, at higher stages of their prayer practice, they reached actual contemplation-union with the Tabor Light, i.e., Uncreated Divine Light seen by the apostles in the event of the Transfiguration of Christ and by Saint Paul on the road to Damascus.

== Dimensions of the conflict ==
Scholars such as Christopher Livanos and Martin Jugie have argued that there are many widely held generalizations and stereotypes that are only partly true and often only applicable to certain individuals and specific periods during the controversy.

Christopher Livanos debunks a number of stereotypes often held regarding Palamism. For example, Livanos takes aim at the West's criticism that the Orthodox are irrational and oppose the use of logic in theology. Livanos asserts that "considering Byzantine, rather than modern Orthodox, polemics it is quite rare for a Greek writer to criticize the Latins for using logic in theology." According to Livanos, "Palamas and Barlaam both claimed Aristotelian logic could support their arguments."

Martin Jugie suggests that many scholars have imprudently indulged in quick generalizations, panoramic overviews and systematic constructions when discussing the hesychast controversy. He lists the following conflicts which have been employed to characterize the controversy:

- a struggle between two philosophical movements, baptized under the names of Aristotelianism and Platonism, or
- nominalism and realism; or
- about an opposition between two cultures, Latin culture represented by Barlaam and those who, after him, opposed Palamas, and Byzantine culture per se, represented by the Palamites; or
- about an antagonism between two ecclesiastical parties, the party of the monks and that of the secular clergy; or, finally,
- about a rivalry between opponents of union with the Latins and those who were called Latinophrones, i.e., those who had unionist tendencies.

Jugie asserts that none of these generalizations is completely true and yet none is completely false. As the various phases of the conflict and the various persons who were involved in it succeeded each other by turn, one or another of these perspectives predominated, though not to the complete exclusion of the others.

=== Knowledge of the nature of God ===
Andrew Louth writes that "[t]he controversy between St Gregory Palamas and Barlaam the Calabrian is now seen by some scholars as less a conflict between Western influences (represented by Barlaam) and authentic Orthodox spirituality, as a conflict within Greek Christianity about the true meaning of Dionysian language about the nature of God: Barlaam interpreting his apophatic theology as intellectual dialectic, and Gregory seeing it as concerned with the ineffable experience of God.

=== Scholasticism ===
Barlaam is typically characterized as having been a Thomist scholastic who valued pagan philosophy over the revelations of the Church Fathers. Juan Nadal Cañellas asserts that "[i]t does not seem possible to affirm, purely and simply, that Barlaam placed reason above revelation or that he accorded more authority to pagan authors than to the Fathers of the Church." According to Nadal, it was Palamas who laid this charge against Barlaam; a charge which Barlaam vehemently denied.

=== Aristotelianism vs. Platonism ===
According to James Hankins, it is sometimes asserted that the Hesychasts represent the native, "Platonic" tradition of the Orthodox Church, while their opponents represent the Aristotelian West. Hankins argues that, "the original debate between Barlaam and Palamas was not a matter of Aristotelianism versus Platonism, but rather grew from a methodological dispute about the best way to defend Orthodoxy against the attacks of the Western controversialists."

Similarly, John Meyendorff asserts that the "widespread view that Eastern Christian thought is Platonic, in contrast to Western Aristotelianism" is erroneous. According to Meyendorff, Byzantine universities taught Aristotelian logic as part of the "general curriculum" but the children of pious families withdrew rather than continuing on to the higher levels where Plato was taught. Meyendorff posits that the target of Byzantine monks in general and Palamas in particular was actually "secular philosophy" and so-called "Hellenic wisdom". He conjectures that the validity of Greek philosophy remained an open question in Byzantine society precisely because the Byzantines were "Greek-speaking" and "Greek-thinking". In stark contrast to this Hellenic culture, Byzantine monastic thought continually emphasized that theirs was a "faith preached by a Jewish Messiah" and that their destiny was to become a "new Jerusalem".

=== Nominalism vs. realism ===
According to Robert E. Sinkewicz, Palamas' only goal was to "preserve the realism of man's participation in the life of God." Characterizing Barlaam as a nominalist agnostic, Meyendorff writes that, "[i]n his flight from the intellectual realism of Western Thomistic scholasticism, Barlaam clashed with the mystical realism of the Eastern monks."

According to Meyendorff, this confrontation between Barlaam's nominalism and Palamas' realism began with a dispute over the best way to address the Filioque controversy with the Latins but quickly spilled over into a conflict over hesychasm. Among his criticisms of Meyendorff's presentation of the hesychast controversy, John Romanides reserves his harshest criticism for Meyendorff's characterization of Barlaam as both a nominalist and a Platonist/Neo-Platonist on the grounds that the histories of philosophy and theology had up to that point presented the two views as mutually exclusive. Romanides proceeds to argue that Barlaam was clearly a Christian Platonist and not a nominalist.

=== Monastic vs. secular clergy ===
Meyendorff characterized the hesychast controversy as a conflict between the Byzantine intellectuals (lovers of secular "Hellenic" learning) and the Palamites (upholders of the mystical monastic tradition). Throughout the history of the Byzantine Empire, there were two factions that took opposing views regarding the relative value of mysticism and secular rationalism. The monastic faction was conservative and staunchly opposed to secular learning. The faction often referred to as the "Byzantine intellectuals" was more liberal and supported a synthesis between ancient Greek philosophy and Christian theology. This latter faction included many of the higher secular clergy). Nick Trakakis cites the hesychast controversy as one of the most significant examples of conflict between these two factions.

=== Latin vs. Byzantine cultures ===
The hesychast controversy is often cast as a conflict between the culture of the Latins and that of the Byzantines. Of course, the two cultures had been developing more or less independently since the division of the Roman Empire in 301 AD. However, Meyendorff asserts that it is precisely in the thirteenth century that "an institutional, social and conceptual bifurcation establishes itself between the Latin West and the Greek (and Slavic) East." In the popular mind (and traditional historiography), Barlaam is generally considered to be a Latinophrone. Romanides identifies Barlaam as indisputably Latin. However, other scholars such as Meyendorff, point to his Orthodox roots. Ultimately, after being rejected by the synod of 1341, he returned to Calabria and was received into the Latin Church and consecrated a bishop.

Martin Jugie states that the opposition of the Latins and the Latinophrones, who were necessarily hostile to the doctrine, was a factor behind the opposition among the populace; eventually Latinism and anti-Palamism became equivalent in the minds of many Orthodox Christians.

=== Supporters and opponents of union with the Latins ===
For several centuries, the Byzantine Empire had been in conflict with the expansion of Islamic forces, first facing the Arabs and then the Seljuk Turks and ultimately the Ottoman Turks. By the fourteenth century, the Byzantine Empire had been in a more or less steady decline since its apex in the eleventh century. During the fourteenth century, Byzantine Emperors appealed to the west for help on a number of occasions; however, the Pope would only consider sending aid in return for a reunion of the Eastern Orthodox Church with the See of Rome. In view of their desperate situation, a number of emperors were willing to pursue union with the Latin Church, and on a number of occasions even attempted to effect such union by imperial decree. However, these attempts at union were frustrated by the intense resentment of the Orthodox citizenry and clergy for the authority of Rome and the Latin Church. The political exigencies of seeking the assistance of the west would periodically influence the course of the theological dispute over hesychasm. The victory of the hesychasts over the Latins and Latinophrones made union with the Western Church harder, if not impossible to achieve, and thus made much less probable the likelihood of assistance from the West in defending against the Turks.

== Chronology of the controversy ==
As an Athonite monk, Palamas had learned to practice hesychasm. Although he had written about hesychasm, it was not until Barlaam attacked it and Palamas as its chief proponent, that Palamas was driven to defend it in a full exposition which became a central component of Eastern Orthodox theology. The debate between the Palamites and Barlaamites continued for over a decade and resulted in a series of synods that culminated finally in 1351 when the Palamite doctrine was canonized as Eastern Orthodox dogma.

=== Early conflict between Barlaam and Palamas ===
Around 1330, Barlaam of Seminara came to Constantinople from Calabria in southern Italy, where he had grown up as a member of the Greek-speaking community there. It is disputed whether he was raised as an Orthodox Christian or converted to the Orthodox faith. He worked for a time on commentaries on Pseudo-Dionysius the Areopagite under the patronage of John VI Kantakouzenos. Around 1336, Gregory Palamas received copies of treatises written by Barlaam against the Latins, condemning their insertion of the Filioque into the Nicene Creed. Although this stance was solid Eastern Orthodox theology, Palamas took issue with Barlaam's argument in support of it, since Barlaam declared efforts at demonstrating the nature of God (specifically, the nature of the Holy Spirit) should be abandoned because God is ultimately unknowable and indemonstrable to humans. Thus, Barlaam asserted that it was impossible to determine from whom the Holy Spirit proceeds. According to Sara J. Denning-Bolle, Palamas viewed Barlaam's argument as "dangerously agnostic". In his response titled "Apodictic Treatises", Palamas insisted that it was indeed demonstrable that the Holy Spirit proceeded from the Father but not from the Son. A series of letters ensued between the two but they were unable to resolve their differences amicably. According to J. Konstantinovsky, although both Barlaam and Palamas claimed Dionysius the Areopagite as their authority, their interpretations were radically different. Barlaam cited Dionysius' Mystical Theology to support the argument that God is unspeakable and therefore unknowable. Palamas cited Dionysius as a patristic authority that professed distinctions in God that Barlaam did not acknowledge.

=== Barlaam's attack on Hesychasm ===
Steven Runciman reports that, infuriated by Palamas' attacks against him, Barlaam vowed to humiliate Palamas by attacking the hesychast teaching for which Palamas had become the chief proponent. Barlaam visited Thessalonica, where he made the acquaintance of monks who followed the hesychast teachings. Runciman describes these monks as ignorant and lacking a real understanding of the hesychast teaching. Barlaam issued a number of treatises mocking the absurdity of the practices, which he reported included "miraculous separations and reunions of the spirit and the soul, of the traffic which demons have with the soul, of the difference between red lights and white lights, of the entry and departure of the intelligence through the nostrils with the breath, of the shields that gather together round the navel, and finally of the union of Our Lord with the soul, which takes place in the full and sensible certitude of the heart within the navel." Barlaam said that the monks had claimed to see the divine essence with bodily eyes, which he viewed as sheer Messalianism. When asked about the light they saw, the monks told him that it was neither of the superessential Essence nor an angelic essence nor the Spirit itself, but that the spirit contemplated it as another hypostasis. Barlaam commented snidely, "I must confess that I do not know what this light is. I only know that it does not exist."

According to Runciman, Barlaam's attack struck home. He had shown that, in the hands of monks who were inadequately instructed and ignorant of the true hesychast teaching, the psycho-physical precepts of hesychasm could produce "dangerous and ridiculous results". To many of the Byzantine intellectuals, hesychasm appeared "shockingly anti-intellectual." Barlaam nicknamed the hesychasts, omphaloscopoi (the navel-gazers); the nickname has coloured the tone of most subsequent Western writing about the Byzantine mystics. However, Barlaam's triumph was short-lived. Ultimately, the Byzantines had a deep respect for mysticism even if they didn't understand it. And, in Palamas, Barlaam found an opponent who was more than his equal in knowledge, intellect and expository skills.

=== The First Triad ===
In response to Barlaam's attacks, Palamas wrote nine treatises entitled "Triads for the Defense of Those Who Practice Sacred Quietude". The treatises are called "Triads" because they were organized as three sets of three treatises. The Triads were written in three stages. The first triad was written in the second half of the 1330s and are based on personal discussions between Palamas and Barlaam although Barlaam is never mentioned by name.

=== The Hagioritic Tome ===
Gregory's teaching was affirmed by the superiors and principal monks of Mt. Athos, who met in synod during 1340–1. In early 1341, Philothos Kokkinos wrote the Hagioritic Tome under the supervision and inspiration of Palamas. Although the Tome does not mention Barlaam by name, the work clearly takes aim at Barlaam's views. The Tome provides a systematic presentation of Palamas' teaching and became the fundamental textbook for Byzantine mysticism.

Barlaam also took exception to the doctrine held by the hesychasts as to the uncreated nature of the light, the experience of which was said to be the goal of hesychast practice, regarding it as heretical and blasphemous. It was maintained by the hesychasts to be of divine origin and to be identical to the light which had been manifested to Jesus' disciples on Mount Tabor at the Transfiguration. Barlaam viewed this doctrine of "uncreated light" to be polytheistic because it postulated two eternal substances, a visible and an invisible God. Barlaam accuses the use of the Jesus Prayer as being a practice of Bogomilism.

=== The Second Triad ===
The second triad quotes some of Barlaam's writings directly. In response to this second triad, Barlaam composed the treatise, "Against the Messalians," linking the hesychasts to the Messalians and thereby accusing them of heresy. In "Against the Messalians", Barlaam attacked Gregory by name for the first time. This time, Barlaam derisively called the hesychasts, omphalopsychoi (men with their souls in their navels) and accused them of the heresy of Messalianism, also known as Bogomilism in the East. According to Meyendorff, Barlaam viewed "any claim of real and conscious experience of God as Messalianism".

=== The Third Triad ===
In the third Triad, Palamas refuted Barlaam's charge of Messalianism by demonstrating that the hesychasts did not share the antisacramentalism of the Messalians nor did they claim to physically see the essence of God with their eyes. Meyendorff writes that "Palamas orients his entire polemic against Barlaam the Calabrian on the issue of the Hellenic wisdom which he considers to be the main source of Barlaam’s errors."

=== Role in the Byzantine civil war ===
Although the civil war between the supporters of John VI Kantakouzenos and Empress Anna of Savoy, both acting as regents for John V Palaeologus was not primarily a religious conflict, the theological dispute between the supporters and opponents of Palamas did play a role. Although several significant exceptions leave the issue open to question, in the popular mind (and traditional historiography), the supporters of "Palamism" and of "Kantakouzenism" are usually equated. However, Steven Runciman points out that "while the theological dispute embittered the conflict, the religious and political parties did not coincide." Kantakouzenos supported Palamas but so did his opponents Alexios Apokaukos and Empress Anna. Nicephorus Gregoras and Demetrios Cydones supported Kantakouzenos and yet were some of the most strident opponents of Palamas. While Kantakouzenos sought to reach an understanding with Rome and Demetrios Cydones ultimately joined the Latin Church, Gregoras remained vehemently Latinophobe. The aristocrats supported Palamas largely due to their conservative and anti-Latin tendencies as well as their links to the staunchly Orthodox monasteries.

It was not until the triumph of Kantakouzenos in taking Constantinople in 1347 that the Palamists were able to achieve a lasting victory over the anti-Palamists. When Kantakouzenos was deposed in 1354, the anti-Palamists were not able to again prevail over the Palamists as they had in the past. Martin Jugie attributes this to the fact that, by this time, the patriarchs of Constantinople and the overwhelming majority of the clergy and laity had come to view the cause of hesychasm as one and the same with that of Orthodoxy.

== Hesychast councils at Constantinople ==
It became clear that the dispute between Barlaam and Palamas was irreconcilable and would require the judgment of an episcopal council. Over the course of eleven years, a total of six synods were held in Constantinople on 10 June 1341, August 1341, 4 November 1344, 1 February 1347, 8 February 1347, and 28 May 1351 to consider the issues. Collectively, these councils are accepted as having ecumenical status by Orthodox Christians, some of whom call them the Fifth Council of Constantinople and the Ninth Ecumenical Council. They are also known as the Hesychast synods. Hubert Cunliffe-Jones asserts that although these synods were local and not general, they have come to be regarded as having an "authority in the Orthodox East that is second only to the seven Ecumenical Councils."

=== Synods of 1341 ===
The dispute over hesychasm came before a synod held at Constantinople in May 1341 and presided over by the emperor Andronicus III. The assembly, influenced by the veneration in which the writings of Pseudo-Dionysius were held in the Eastern Church, condemned Barlaam, who recanted. The ecumenical patriarch insisted that all of Barlaam's writings be destroyed and thus no complete copies of Barlaam's treatise "Against Messalianism" have survived.

Barlaam's primary supporter Emperor Andronicus III died just five days after the synod ended. Although Barlaam initially hoped for a second chance to present his case against Palamas, he soon realised the futility of pursuing his cause, and left for Calabria where he converted to the Latin Church and was appointed Bishop of Gerace.

After Barlaam's departure, Gregory Akindynos became the chief critic of Palamas. A second council held in Constantinople in August 1341 condemned Akindynos and affirmed to findings of the earlier council. According to Martin Jugie, this second synod was a conciliabulum rather than a council because "the patriarch refused to appear at it, and the assembly was gathered against his will."

Martin Jugie characterizes the history of the quarrel from this point on as "highly complicated and rather obscure". The debate, which had been a purely religious one, from this point onwards takes on also a political complexion.

=== Arrest and imprisonment of Palamas ===
Palamas was arrested in the autumn of 1342 at Heraclea, where he had taken refuge, and shortly thereafter he was imprisoned in the monastery of the Incomprehensible where he remained until Kantakouzenos triumphantly entered Constantinople in 1347.

During this period, John XIV ordained Akindynos first as a deacon, then as a priest and ultimately as a bishop. This move angered the Empress and was the beginning of a rift between them that ultimately led to his downfall.

=== Synod of 1344 ===
Akindynos and his supporters gained a brief victory at the third synod held in 1344, which excommunicated Palamas and one of his disciples, Isidore Buchiras. Palamas and Buchiras recanted.

=== Synods of 1347 ===
In February 1347, a fourth synod was held, which deposed the patriarch, John XIV, and excommunicated Akindynos. Isidore Buchiras, who had been excommunicated by synod of 1344, was now made patriarch. Within days after the end of the conciliabulum, however, John VI Kantakouzenos, victoriously entered Constantinople and forced his opponents to crown him co-emperor. One of his first acts was to confirm the deposition of John XIV and to approve the synodal tome that had just been issued against him.

In July 1347, the Barlaamite party held a competing synod that refused to acknowledge Isidore as patriarch and excommunicated Palamas. The leaders of this group were Neophytos of Philippi, Joseph of Ganos, and Matthew of Ephesus at their head. Although there were only about ten present at the synod, they also held letters of approbation from about twenty anti-Palamite bishops of provincial sees. The synod issued a tome, titled De perpetua consensione, in which the theology of Barlaam and of Akindynos was rejected as well as that of Palamas.

=== The Capita 150 ===
Sometime between 1344 and 1350, Palamas wrote the Capita 150 ("One hundred and fifty chapters"). Robert E. Sinkewicz describes this work as an attempt to "recapture the larger vision that had become obscured by the minutiae of the debates." Sinkewicz asserts that "among the polemical works of Palamas, the "Capita 150" is comparable only in importance to "The Triads".

=== Synod of 1351 ===
Akindynos having died in 1348, Nicephorus Gregoras became the chief opponent of hesychasm. When Isidore I died in 1349, the hesychasts replaced him by one of their monks, Callistus I.

In May 1351, a patriarchal council was held. Kantakouzenos opened the first session on 27 May expressing a desire for peace and harmony but only on the condition that the Palamite dogmas be accepted. Gregoras, speaking for the anti-Palamites, rejected Kantakouzenos' terms and insisted that it was necessary to expel the polytheism of Palamas from the Church. In rebuttal, Palamas accused his opponents of teaching the doctrines of Barlaam and Akindynos and proposed a re-examination of their writings. The anti-Palamites responded that neither Barlaam nor Akindynos were the subjects of the dispute and argued that they were prepared to repudiate the teachings of both men. The anti-Palamites asserted that the real question before the council was whether Palamas' theology was in accordance with the traditional doctrine of the Church and that it was Palamas' works that should be examined. After a heated debate, it was agreed that Palamas would appear before the council in the position of the accused, and that Gregoras and his followers would have full liberty to present their grievances against him.

In the end, the council conclusively exonerated Palamas and condemned his opponents. This synod ordered that the metropolitans Matthew of Ephesus and Joseph of Ganos be defrocked and jailed. All those who were unwilling to submit to the orthodox view were to be excommunicated and kept under surveillance at their residences. A series of anathemas were pronounced against Barlaam, Akindynos and their followers; at the same time, a series of acclamations were also declared in favor of Gregory Palamas and the adherents of his doctrine.

Nicephorus Gregoras refused to submit to the dictates of the synod and was effectively imprisoned in a monastery until the Palaeologi triumphed in 1354 and deposed Kantakouzenos.

== Gradual acceptance of the new doctrine ==
After the triumph of the Palæologi, the Barlaamite faction convened an anti-hesychast synod at Ephesus but, by this time, the patriarchs of Constantinople and the overwhelming majority of the clergy and laity had come to view the cause of hesychasm as one and the same with that of Orthodoxy. Those who opposed it were accused of Latinizing. Martin Jugie states that the opposition of the Latins and the Latinophrones, who were necessarily hostile to the doctrine, actually contributed to its adoption, and soon Latinism and Antipalamism became equivalent in the minds of many Orthodox Christians. Jugie asserts that only the Emperor John V could have reversed the fortunes of the hesychasts again and restored the Barlaamite faction. However, since he did not do so, the hesychasts remained in the ascendancy.

However, although the Barlaamites could no longer win over the hierarchy of the Eastern Orthodox Church in a synod, neither did they submit immediately to the new doctrine. Throughout the second half of the fourteenth century, there are numerous reports of Christians returning from the "Barlaamite heresy" to Palamite orthodoxy, suggesting that the process of imposing universal acceptance of Palamism spanned several decades.

Callistus I and the ecumenical patriarchs who succeeded him mounted a vigorous campaign to have the new doctrine accepted by the other Eastern patriarchates as well as all the metropolitan sees under their jurisdiction. However, it took some time to overcome initial resistance to the doctrine. Manuel Kalekas reports on this repression as late as 1397. One example of resistance was the response of the metropolitan of Kiev who, upon receiving tomes from Kallistos that expounded the Palamist doctrine, rejected the new doctrine vehemently and composed a reply refuting it. Similarly, the patriarchate of Antioch remained steadfastly opposed to what they viewed as an innovation; however, by the end of the fourteenth century, Palamism had become accepted there as well as in all the other Eastern patriarchates. Similar acts of resistance were seen in the metropolitan sees that were governed by the Latins as well as in some autonomous ecclesiastical regions, such as the Church of Cyprus.

One notable example of the campaign to enforce the orthodoxy of the Palamist doctrine was the action taken by patriarch Philotheos I to crack down on the brothers Demetrios Kydones and Prochoros Kydones. With the support of his younger brother Prochoros, Demetrios Kydones opposed as polytheistic or pantheistic the Palamites and their system of hesychasm. Applying Aristotelian logic as espoused by Thomas Aquinas to the Neoplatonic character of hesychasm, the Kydones brothers accused Palamas of pantheism or polytheism, only to be condemned themselves by three successive Palamite synods that also canonized Palamas and hesychasm. The two brothers had continued to argue forcefully against Palamism even when brought before the patriarch and enjoined to adhere to the orthodox doctrine. Finally, in exasperation, Philotheos convened a synod against the two Cydones in April 1368. However, even this extreme measure failed to effect the submission of Cydones and in the end, Prochorus was excommunicated and suspended from the clergy in perpetuity. The long tome that was prepared for the synod concludes with a decree canonizing Palamas who had died in 1359.

Despite the initial opposition of the anti-Palamites and some patriarchates and sees, the resistance dwindled away over time and ultimately Palamist doctrine became accepted throughout the Eastern Orthodox Church. During this period, it became the norm for ecumenical patriarchs to profess the Palamite doctrine upon taking possession of their see. For theologians who remained in opposition, there was ultimately no choice but to emigrate and convert to the Latin church, a path taken by Kalekas as well as Demetrios Kydones and John Kyparissiotes.

== Impact of the controversy on the Byzantine Empire ==
The Hesychast controversy took place in midst of the Byzantine civil war, with the Hesychast party supporting John Kantakouzenos while the anti-Hesychasts tallying behind Anna of Savoy. Although Kantakouzenos ultimately lost the war, but during the brief period when he was the emperor was decisive for the Hesychast party to assert itself as orthodoxy and push out its opponents. Opposition to the Palamas' doctrine was equated with Uniatism, which furthered religious polarisation, given the memories of the 1204 sack of Constantinople and conflict with Catholic entities like the Latin Empire, Duchy of Athens, and Venetian Crete being fresh in minds of the people. The Hesychast controversy solidified the Great Schism and further hardened opinions on both sides. After the civil war, when Byzantine emperors sought union with Catholic Church with the aim of obtaining military support against Muslims, with the Byzantine emperors themselves converting to Catholicism at the Council of Florence to placate the Popes, Hesychast figures like Mark of Ephesus vehemently argued against it. According to Meyendorff, some of the group known as the "Byzantine humanists" saw the victory of the hesychasts as "a tragedy of major proportions." At a crucial point in the Empire's history, the leadership of the Church had passed into the hands of religious zealots. Following the Fall of Constantinople, Hesychast supporter Gennadius Scholarius was strategically appointed Patriarch of Constantinople in order to dissuade union with the Catholic Church.

== Modern acceptance of the doctrine ==
According to Aristeides Papadakis, "all (modern) Orthodox scholars who have written on Palamas – Lossky, Krivosheine, Papamichael, Meyendorff, Christou – assume his voice to be a legitimate expression of Orthodox tradition."

The Council of Crete in 2016 reaffirmed the authority of the Fifth Council of Constantinople, stating: "The Conciliar work continues uninterrupted in history through the later councils of universal authority, such as, for example, the Great Council (879-880) convened at the time of St. Photius the Great, Patriarch of Constantinople, and also the Great Councils convened at the time of St. Gregory Palamas (1341, 1351, 1368), through which the same truth of faith was confirmed."

== See also ==
- Pseudo-Dionysius the Areopagite
- Demetrios Kydones

== Bibliography ==
- Anstall, Kharalambos (2007). "Juridical Justification Theology and a Statement of the Orthodox Teaching". Stricken by God? Nonviolent Identification and the Victory of Christ. Grand Rapids, MI: Eerdmans.
- Bradshaw, David (2004). Aristotle East and West: Metaphysics and the Division of Christendom. Cambridge University Press. ISBN 978-1-139-45580-0.
- Gross, Jules (2003). The Divinization of the Christian According to the Greek Fathers. A & C Press. ISBN 978-0-7363-1600-2.
- Jeffreys, Elizabeth; Haldon, John; Cormack, Robin, eds. (2009), The Oxford Handbook of Byzantine Studies, Oxford University Press, ISBN 978-0-19-925246-6
- Lossky, Vladimir (1991). The Mystical Theology of the Eastern Church. SVS Press. (ISBN 0-913836-31-1), James Clarke & Co Ltd. (ISBN 0-227-67919-9) Copy online
- Sack, John (1959). Report from Practically Nowhere. New York: Curtis Publishing Company. pp. 156–157.
- Treadgold, Warren (1997). A History of the Byzantine State and Society. Stanford, California: Stanford University Press. ISBN 0-8047-2630-2.
- Kazhdan, Alexander, ed. (1991). The Oxford Dictionary of Byzantium. Vol. 1. New York: Oxford University Press. ISBN 9780195046526. – "The Oxford dictionary of Byzantium: Aaron-Eski". The Oxford Dictionary of Byzantium. Vol. 2. New York: Oxford University Press. 1991. ISBN 9780195046526. – The Oxford Dictionary of Byzantium. Vol. 3. New York: Oxford University Press. 1991. ISBN 9780195046526.
- Runciman, Steven (1990). The Fall of Constantinople, 1453. Cambridge, England: Cambridge University Press. ISBN 978-0-521-39832-9.
