= De viris illustribus urbis Romae =

Ancient literary work written in Latin

The anonymous work De viris illustribus urbis Romae (English: Famous Men of Rome) is a Latin work offering an outline of Roman history in the form of 86 short biographies from the founding of the city to the Principate of Augustus. Contrary to what the title suggests, however, not only famous commanders and politicians are included, but also illustrious female figures (13: Cloelia; 46: Claudia; 86: Cleopatra) and outstanding enemies of Rome (42: Hannibal; 54: Antiochos III; 76: Mithridates VI). There is no discernible difference between Romans and non-Romans or positive and negative figures. In terms of type and structure, the writing fits best into the context of the late antique breviaries of the 4th century (Periochae, Eutrop, Rufius Festus, etc.), so that a writing in the 4th century seems plausible.

The biographical character of the Viri illustres is most clearly visible in the vitae of the seven kings, in which lineage and accession to the throne, internal and external achievements, and finally the end of life form the guiding points of view. The focus within the 'republican' biographies, on the other hand, is on the achievements of the individual figures and persons for the res publica Romana. Thus, triumphs as well as honours by the state, whether during life in the form of gold wreaths, land and statues, or after death through state funerals and state mourning, are often noted. The guiding principle in individual cases is the respective cursus honorum, but this principle is not consistently followed through. The individual character sketch is consistently reduced to sparse notes or exemplary dicta and facta. The Viri illustres thus singularly represent the type of so-called exempla biography.

== Structure and language ==
The arrangement or sequence of the individual chapters essentially follows the historical chronology, which in individual cases, however, is overlaid by genealogical or other factual references or interrupted by gross violations. The simple style and unpretentious language correspond to the concise informative character of the text. Characteristic is a style that dispenses with longer sentence periods and more detailed hypotaxes. Asyndetic enumerations and sentence cola are conspicuous, the tautness of which has sometimes led to logical inconsistencies. Characteristic of the lack of stylisation is the use of stereotypical phrases and technical terms, and in some cases the repetition of individual conjunctions, longer passages and even entire sentences. All in all, the text cannot be denied that it is based on classical Latin, but linguistic and stylistic inconsistencies as well as elements of a later use of language cannot be overlooked.

== Sources ==
The abundance of details clearly distinguishes the Viri illustres from the late antique breviaries and compendia. Although researchers have long attributed the Viri illustres to the Livian tradition, it is now assumed that it is an independent historical tradition independent of the historiography of Titus Livius, for which a template from the Late Republic can be deduced, which worked with the same material as Titus Livius and Dionysus of Halicarnassus. In writing his biographies, the unknown author of the Viri illustres most likely did not write out and combine several different sources, but only worked on a single, biographically structured template. The significant similarities with the Liber memorialis of Lucius Ampelius, but above all with the elogia of the Forum of Augustus, also point to an author from the circle of the first princeps, who can possibly be identified with his librarian and antiquary C. Iulius Hyginus.

== Transmission ==
The tradition is based on two text families, a shorter one with 78 biographies, which ends with the death of Pompeius (77,9), and a longer version in 86 biographies, which most likely represents the original text length. The latter forms the middle part of the so-called Corpus Aurelianum, which an unknown editor probably compiled in the second half of the 4th century by merging the so-called Origo gentis Romanae with the Viri illustres and the imperial history of Aurelius Victor (Historiae abbreviatae) in order to span a temporal arc from the mythical early period through the kings and the Republic to Constantius II (337–361).

== Editions ==
- Les hommes illustres de la ville de Rome. Text établi et traduit par Paul Marius Martin. Les Belles Lettres, Paris 2016, ISBN 978-2-251-01470-8
- Ps. Aurelius Victor: De viris illustribus urbis Romae. The famous men of the city of Rome. Latin and German. Edited, translated and annotated by Joachim Fugmann. Wissenschaftliche Buchgesellschaft, Darmstadt 2016, ISBN 978-3-534-23852-1
