= Kerameus =

Kerameus is a surname. Notable people with the surname include:

- Niki Kerameus (born 1980), Greek lawyer and politician
- Theophanes Kerameus (1129–1152), bishop of Rossano
