= Claudius Salmasius =

French classical scholar, writer and professor in Leiden (1588–1653)

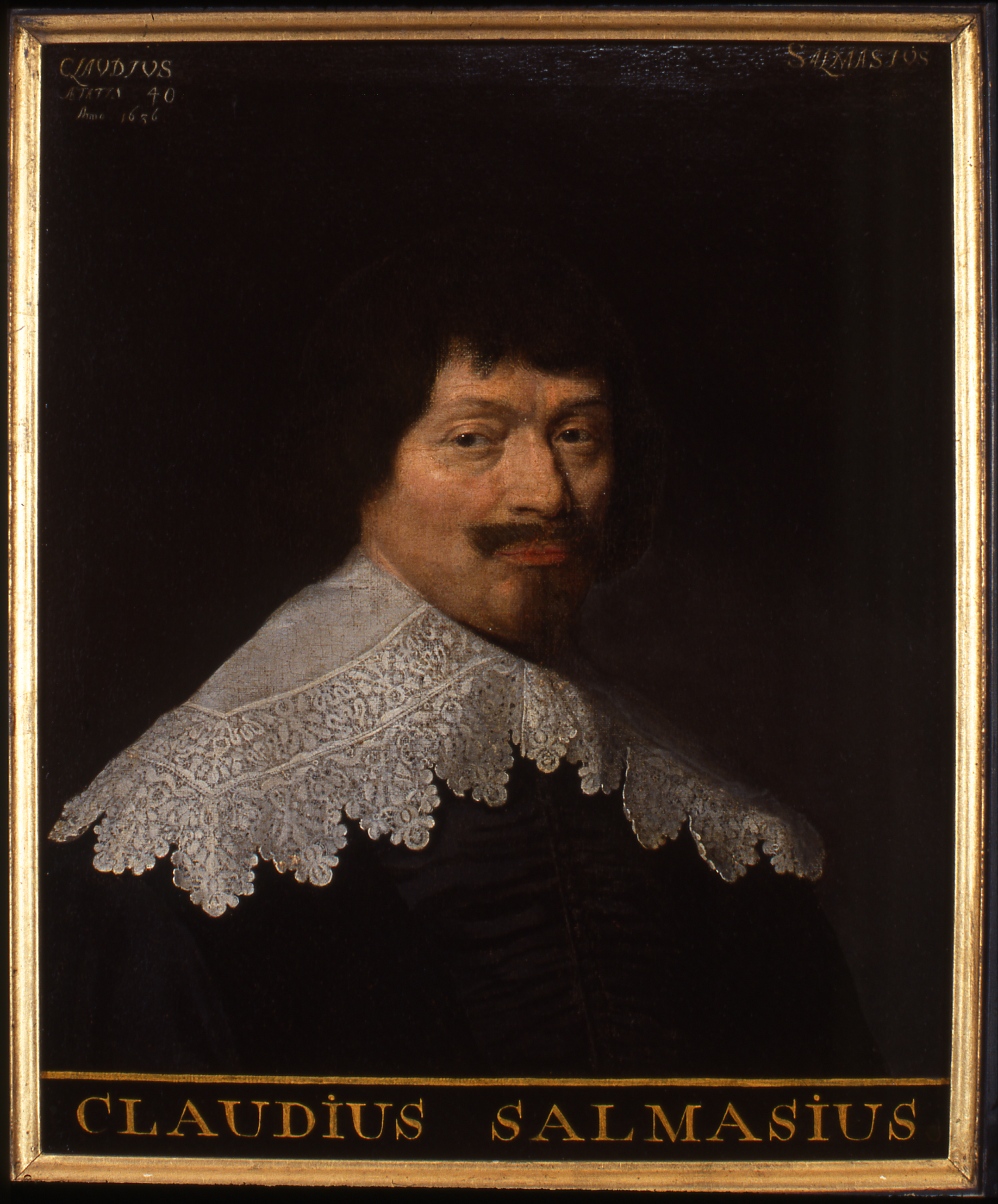
Portrait by David Bailly

Claude Saumaise (15 April 1588 – 3 September 1653), also known by the Latin name Claudius Salmasius, was a French classical scholar.

== Life ==
Salmasius was born at Semur-en-Auxois in Burgundy. When Salmasius was sixteen, his father – a counsellor of the parlement of Dijon – sent him to Paris, where he became intimate with Isaac Casaubon (1559–1614). In 1606 he went to the University of Heidelberg, where he studied under the jurist Denis Godefroy, and devoted himself to the classics, influenced by the librarian Jan Gruter. Here he embraced Protestantism, the religion of his mother.

Returning to Burgundy, Salmasius qualified for the succession to his father's post, which he eventually lost on account of his religion. In 1623 he married Anne Mercier, a Protestant woman of a distinguished family. After declining overtures from Oxford, Padua and Bologna, in 1631 he accepted the professorship formerly held by Joseph Scaliger at Leiden. Although the appointment in a number of ways suited him, he found the climate trying. He became involved in a vicious controversy, over the Greek of the New Testament, with Daniel Heinsius. The quarrel became both highly personal and widely known, and Heinsius as university librarian refused him access to the books he wished to consult. Salmasius had an ally in Gerardus Vossius, on religious grounds.

Following his polemical Defensio regia of 1649, a flattering invitation from Queen Christina induced him to visit Sweden in 1650. Christina loaded him with gifts and distinctions. Salmasius had enemies there: Nikolaes Heinsius, son of his foe Heinsius, but also Isaac Vossius (son of Gerardus) with whom he had fallen out. They circulated gossip about him.

Salmasius withdrew from Sweden in 1651; Christina sent warm letters and pressed him to return.

Salmasius died on 3 September 1653, at Spa.

== Work ==
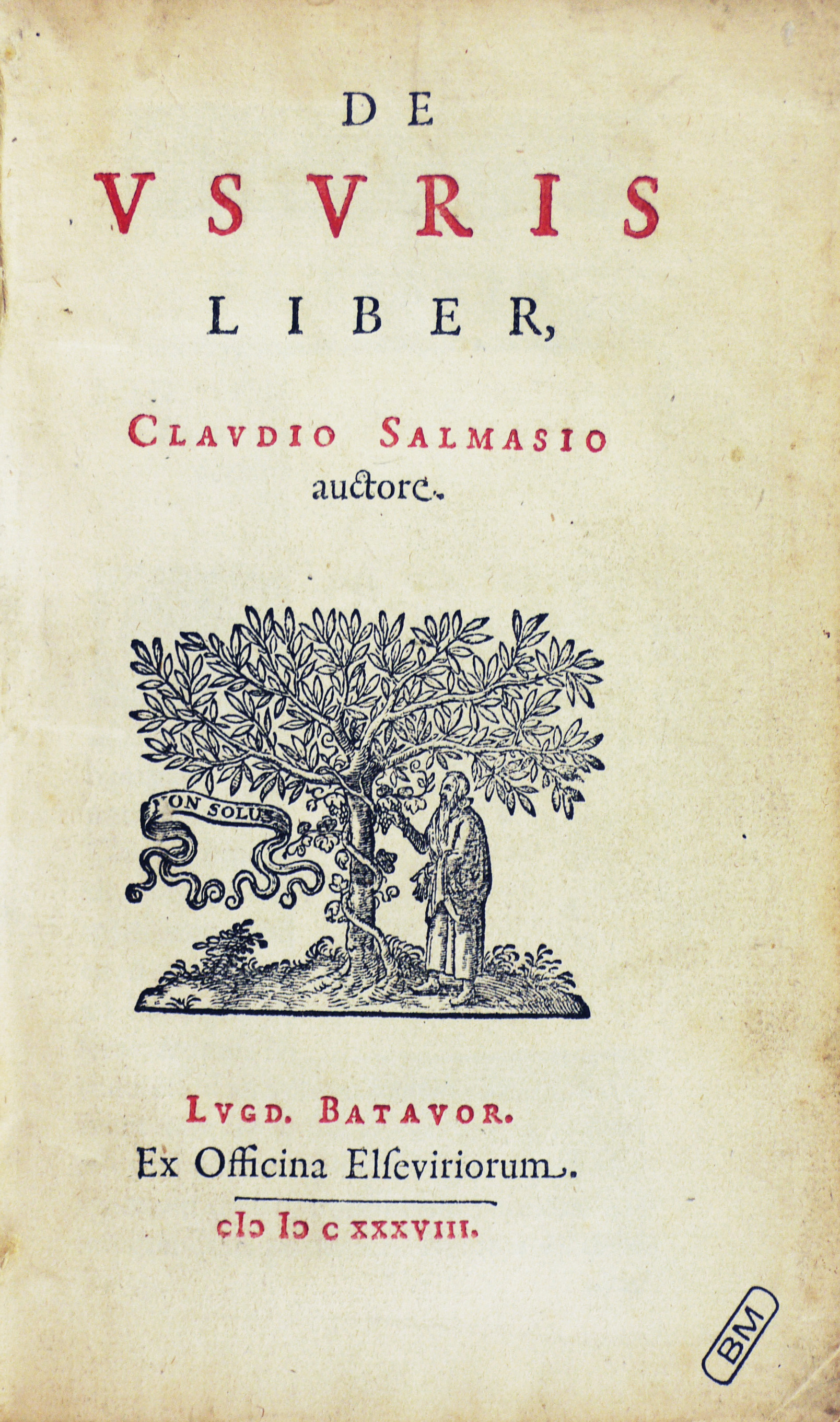
De usuris liber, 1638

He was a prolific author and textual critic. He first published (1608) an edition of a work by Nilus Cabasilas, (archbishop of Thessalonica in the 14th century) against the primacy of the pope (De primatu Papae), and an edition of a similar tract by the Calabrian monk Barlaam of Seminara (ca. 1290–1348). In 1609 he brought out an edition of Florus; a later edition (1638) included also the editio princeps of the Liber Memorialis of Lucius Ampelius.

In 1606 or 1607 Salmasius had discovered in the library of the Counts Palatine in Heidelberg the only surviving copy of Cephalas's 10th-century unexpurgated copy of the Greek Anthology, including the 258-poem anthology of homoerotic poems by Straton of Sardis that would eventually become known as the notorious Book 12 of the Greek Anthology. Salmasius made copies of the newly discovered poems in the Palatine version and began to circulate clandestine manuscript copies of them as the Anthologia Inedita. His copy later appeared in print: first in 1776 when Richard François Philippe Brunck included it in his Analecta; and also when Friedrich Jacobs published the full Palatine Anthology as the Anthologia Graeca (13 vols. 1794-1803; revised 1813-1817). The remains of Straton's anthology became Book 12 in Jacob's standard critical Anthologia Graeca edition. Only in 2001 did a full Greek-to-English translation of Book 12 appear (from Princeton University Press).

In 1620 Salmasius published Casaubon's notes on the Augustan History, with copious additions of his own. In 1629 he produced his magnum opus as a critic, his commentary on Gaius Julius Solinus's Polyhistor, or rather on Pliny the Elder, to whom Solinus is indebted for the most important part of his work. Greatly as his contemporaries may have overrated this commentary, it stands as a monument of learning and industry. Salmasius learned Arabic to qualify himself for the botanical part of his task.

Shortly after his removal to the Netherlands, Salmasius composed (at the request of Prince Frederick Henry of Nassau) his treatise on the military system of the Romans (De re militari Romanorum), which remained unpublished until 1657. Other works followed, mostly philological, but including a denunciation of wigs and hair-powder.

The De usuris liber (1630) and subsequent writing was a vindication of moderate and lawful interest for money. Although it was opposed by lawyers and theologians, the Dutch Reformed Church began to admit money-lenders to the sacrament. His treatise De primatu Papae (1645), accompanying a republication of the tract of Nilus Cabasilas, excited controversy in France, but the government declined to suppress it.

In 1643 he published De Hellenistica Commentarius, including linguistic theories of Johann Elichmann on the origins of the Greek language. In 1649, in November, appeared the work for which some remember Salmasius best: his royalist tract Defensio regia pro Carolo I provoked by the execution of Charles I.

His advice had already been sought on English and Scottish affairs, and, inclining to Presbyterianism or to a modified episcopacy, he had written against the English religious Independents. It remains unknown whose influence induced him to undertake the Defensio regia, but Charles II defrayed the expense of printing, and presented the author with £100. The first edition appeared anonymously, but the author was universally known. A French translation (which speedily appeared under the name of "Claude Le Gros") was the work of Salmasius himself. This celebrated work provoked from John Milton the Defensio pro Populo Anglicano, including attacks on Salmasius's wife along with much other vituperation. Milton also claimed that Salmasius's withdrawal from Sweden in 1651 was due to the attack, but Christina's continued warmth in letters to him argue against that cause. His reply to Milton remained unfinished at his death: his son published it in 1660.

He is the author of Simplicii Verini, sive Claudii Salmasii, de Transsubstantiatione liber, ad justum pacium, contra H. Grotium..

== Legacy ==
Philibert de La Mare, counsellor of the parlement of Dijon, inherited Salmasius' manuscripts from his son and wrote a lengthy life of Salmasius. Papillon says that this biography left nothing to desire, but no printed edition has ever appeared. However, Papillon himself used de La Mare's work for his account of Salmasius in his Bibliothèque des auteurs de Bourgogne — by far the best extant. Papillon included an exhaustive list of Salmasius' works, both printed and in manuscript.

Antoine Clément prefixed a eulogy to his edition of Salmasius's Letters (Leiden, 1656), and C. B. Morisot inserted another into his own Letters (Dijon, 1656). See also Eugène Haag, La France protestante, (ix. 149-x73); and, for the Defensio regia, David Masson's Life of Milton.

== Works ==
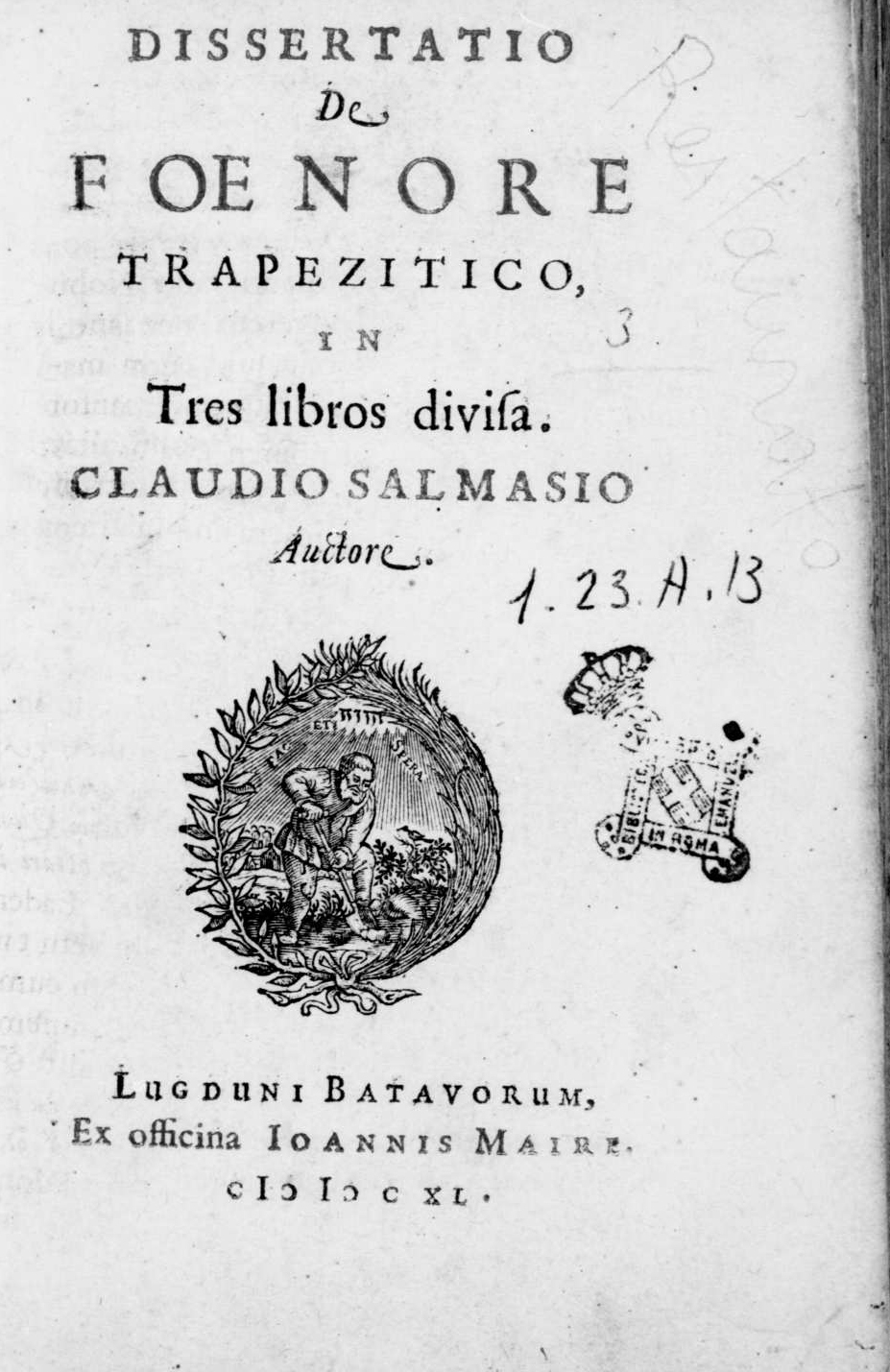
Dissertatio de foenore trapezitico, 1640

- De usuris (in Latin) (in-8° ed.). Leiden: Bonaventura Elzevier & Abraham Elzevier. 1638.
- Dissertatio de foenore trapezitico (in Latin). Leiden: Joannes Maire. 1640.
- Diatriba de mutuo, non esse alienationem (in Latin). Leiden: Joannes Maire. 1640.
- De primatu Papae, 1645.
- De cruce, Leiden, Joannes Maire, 1646.
- De Transsubstantiatione liber, Simplicio Verino autore. Ad Justum Pacium contra H. Grotium. typis T. Eudoxi. 1646.
  - Simplicii Verini, sive Claudii Salmasii, de Transsubstantiatione liber, ad justum pacium, contra H. Grotium (2 ed.). Leiden: P. Hackius. 1660.
- Defensio regia pro Carolo I, 1649.
- Epistolae, Leiden, 1656.
- De re militari Romanorum, 1657.
