= Molorchus (Heracles) =

Molorchus (Ancient Greek: Μόλορχος) was a day labourer at Cleonae who hosted Heracles when he came on his way to Nemea to kill the Nemean lion.

== Mythology ==
Molorchus prepared to sacrifice a sacrificial animal. Herakles persuaded him to delay it for thirty days, and if he returned safe from the hunt, to sacrifice to Saviour Zeus, but if he was killed, to sacrifice to him as to a hero.

Molorchus was about to sacrifice the animal as if Heracles was dead, on the last day of the thirty days, when Heracles suddenly returned. They then sacrificed to Saviour Zeus and Heracles brought the lion to Mycenae.

Lucius Ampelius described Molorchus as a friend of Heracles who gave him the club with which Heracles killed the lion.

== Roman literature ==
In Martial's Epigrams, Molorchus household is associated with hospitality and is used as a model of simple but honourable reception in comparison with luxurious estates. In another epigram, a bronze statue of Heracles made by Lysippus, once owned by Alexander the Great, is described as moving between royal courts and private homes. The text contrasts powerful courts with private households, saying Heracles prefers modest homes; within this contrast, Molorchus is mentioned as an example of a benevolent private host of Hercules, representing the tradition that the Heracles could be received not only by kings but also by humble, worthy individuals in private homes.

== Etymology ==
The term "the grove of Molorchus" ("lucos Molorchi") was used as a poetic name for the Nemean forest. Vibius Sequester also writes that a grove at Nemea was named after Molorchus.

Molorchia (Μολορχία) was a city of ancient Nemea, which took its name from Molorchus.
