= Anthony the Confessor =

9th century Byzantine archbishop of Thessalonike

Venerable Anthony the Confessor
- Archbishop of Thessalonica
- Church: Eastern Orthodox Church
- Diocese: Metropolis of Thessaloniki
- Appointed: Methodios I of Constantinople
- In office: ca. summer 843 - 2 November 843
- Predecessor: Leo the Mathematician
- Successor: Basil II
- Other post: Archbishop of Dyrrachium (ca. 815–?)

Personal details
- Died: 2 November 843

Sainthood
- Feast day: 2 November

Anthony the Confessor (Greek: Άντώνιος ό Ομολογήτης; died 2 November 843) was the archbishop of Thessalonica from 843 to his death. Most of his life is known through the vita of his relative Theodora of Thessalonica and he is venerated like her by the Eastern Orthodox Church on 2 November.

== Biography ==
Anthony was a relative of Theodora of Thessalonica, whose daughter was for some time nun at the monastery of St. Luke where his sister Aikaterine was the superior. At some time before 815, he was elected archbishop of Dyrrachium.

As a strong opponent of Byzantine Iconoclasm, he confronted emperor Leo V the Armenian and was therefore tortured and exiled by the latter. Under Leo's successor Michael II who was more lenient towards iconophiles Anthony was allowed to return from exile. Some time after the Council of Constantinople which reinstated the veneration of icons on 11 March 843, he was appointed by patriarch Methodios I of Constantinople as Archbishop of Thessalonica to replace Leo the Mathematician. Anthony died on 2 November 843.

== Veneration ==
Gregory the Presbyter included the biography of Anthony the Confessor in his vita of Anthony's relative, Theodora of Thessalonike.

The eleventh century monk Guillermus Ludovicus brought along with the many other relics he collected during his time in Byzantine Nicomedia some unspecified relic of Anthony to the abbey of St Paul in Cormery.

== Sources ==
- Domínguez, Óscar Prieto (4 February 2021). Literary Circles in Byzantine Iconoclasm: Patrons, Politics and Saints. Cambridge University Press. ISBN 978-1-108-86521-0.
- Efthymiadis, Stephanos (28 July 2013). "Hagiography from the "Dark Age" to the Age of Symeon Metaphrastes (Eight-Tenth Centuries)". The Ashgate Research Companion to Byzantine Hagiography: Volume I: Periods and Places. Ashgate Publishing, Ltd. pp. 95–142. ISBN 978-1-4094-8268-0.
- Shephard, Jonathan (2005). Zwischen Polis, Provinz und Peripherie: Beiträge zur byzantinischen Geschichte und Kultur Volumen 7 de Mainzer Veröffentlichungen zur Byzantinistik. Otto Harrassowitz Verlag. pp. 306–311. ISBN 9783447051705.
- Talbot, Alice-Mary Maffry (1996). "Life of St. Theodora of Thessalonike". Holy Women of Byzantium: Ten Saints' Lives in English Translation. Dumbarton Oaks. pp. 159–238. ISBN 978-0-88402-248-0.
- "November 2, 2018. + Orthodox Calendar". orthochristian.com.
