= Anthimos Rousas =

Greek bishop of Thessaloniki (1934–2025)

His Eminence Anthimos
- Emeritus Metropolitan of Thessaloniki
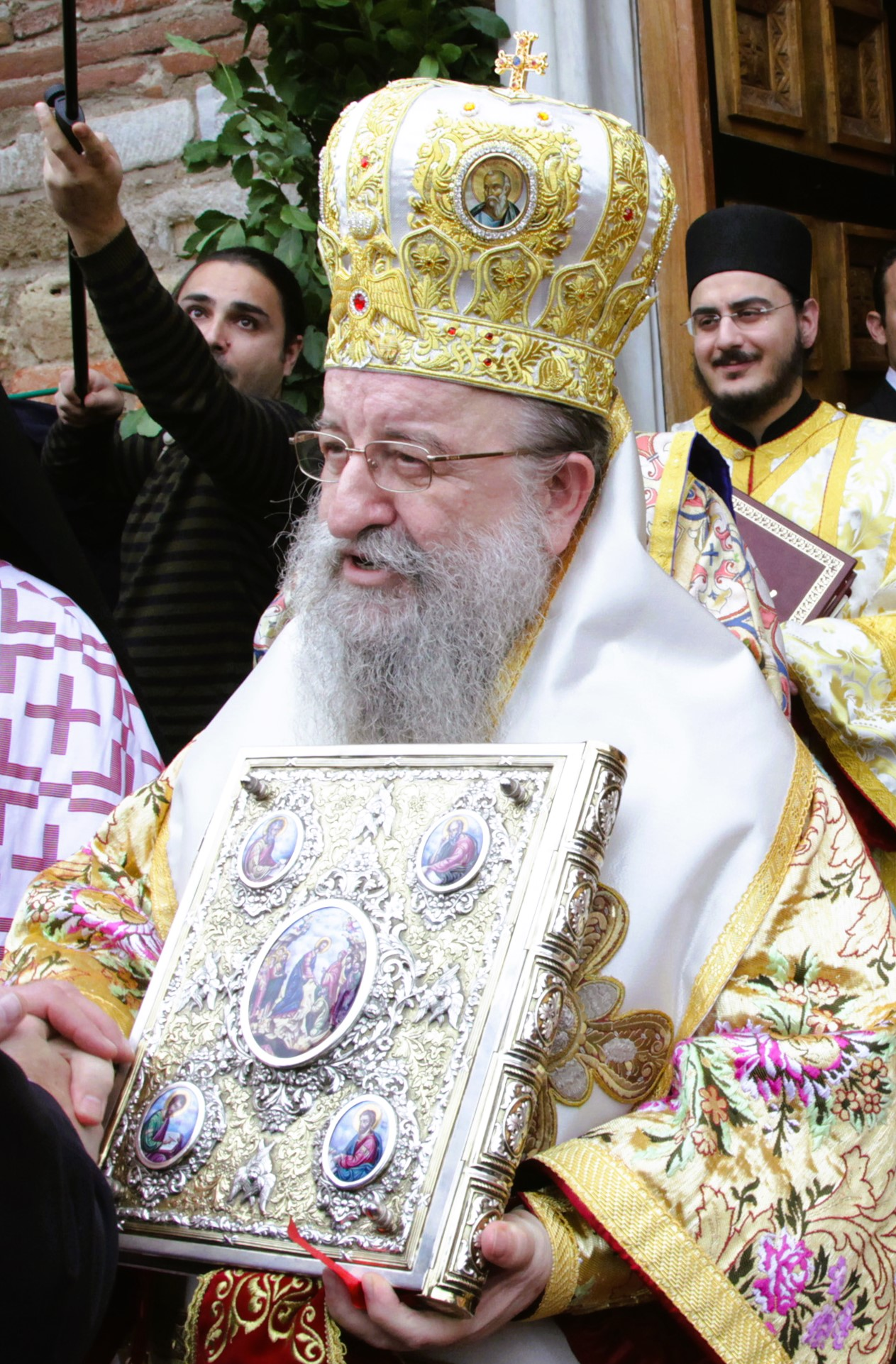
- Anthimos in 2009
- Native name: Μητροπολίτης πρώην Θεσσαλονίκης Άνθιμος
- Church: Church of Greece
- See: Thessaloniki
- Installed: April 26, 2004
- Term ended: August 7, 2023
- Predecessor: Panteleimon II (Chrysofakis)
- Successor: Filotheos (Theocharis)
- Previous post: Metropolitan of Alexandroupolis (1974-2004)

Orders
- Ordination: July 14, 1974 by Gabriel (Kalokairinos)
- Consecration: July 13, 1974

Personal details
- Born: Dionysios Roussas; 1934 Salmoni, Elis, Greece
- Died: March 13, 2025 (aged 90–91) Thessaloniki
- Denomination: Eastern Orthodox Christianity

Anthimos Rousas (1934 – March 13, 2025) was the Metropolitan of Thessaloniki from 2004 to 2023.

== Life ==
Anthimos was born Dionysios Rousas in Salmoni, Elis in 1934. A graduate of Philosophy and Theology at the University of Athens, he was ordained a deacon in 1964. The following year, in 1965, he was ordained to the priesthood. During this time, from 1965 to 1972, Anthimos was also an editor of the weekly bulletin "Voice of the Lord", which advocated for and spread the teachings of the Church. As a priest, Anthimos was the head of the Church of St Basil in Athens.

On July 14, 1974, Anthimos was ordained Metropolitan of Alexandroupolis. Anthimos remained in that Metropolis for three decades, until following the death of Metropolitan Panteleimon II Chrysofakis of Thessaloniki, he was transferred to the Metropolis of Thessaloniki in 2003, later elected in 2004.

As Metropolitan of Thessaloniki, Anthimos actively engaged in social and spiritual affairs. He was known for his highly conservative views on these matters. In August 2023, Anthimos, following health problems, submitted his resignation to the Archbishop Ieronymos II of Athens. With his successor, Philotheos (Theocharis) taking the role of Metropolitan, Anthimos became Emeritus Metropolitan of Thessaloniki.

Metropolitan Anthimos died on 13 March 2025, at the age of 91. His funeral was held on March 15, 2025, at the Cathedral of St. Sophia (Holy Wisdom) in Thessaloniki. By his wish he was buried in the cenotaph in the courtyard of the Metropolitan Church of Saint Gregory Palamas, in Thessaloniki.
