= Marcus Diadochus =

Marcus Diadochus (Greek: Mάρκος ὁ διάδοχος) was a Christian writer of the fourth century.

His name is at the head of a "Sermon against the Arians" (Greek τοῦ μακαρἰoυ Mάρκου τοῦ Διάδοχου κατὰ Ἀρειανῶν λόγος, Latin Beati Marci Diadochi Sermo contra Arianos). It was discovered by Johann Rudolf Wettstein in a manuscript codex of St. Athanasius at Basel and published by him at the end of his edition of Origen. Another version of the same work was lent by Galliciolli to Andrea Gallandi and published in the Veterum Patrum Bibliotheca, V (Venice, 1765–1781). This is the text in Patrologia Graeca.

The sermon quotes and expounds the usual biblical texts, and answers difficulties.

Diadochus, Bishop of Photike in Epirus in the fifth century, is a different person, author of a "Sermon on the Ascension" and of a hundred "Chapters on Spiritual Perfection"; whom Victor Vitensis praises in the prologue of his history of the Vandal persecution. The two are often confused, as Migne does.
