= Theodora of Thessaloniki =

9th century Byzantine nun and saint

Venerable Theodora of Thessalonica
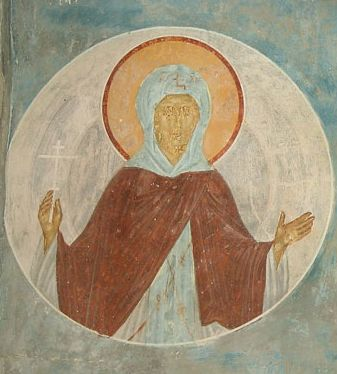
- Theodora of Thessalonica in a fresco by Dionisius in the Ferapontov Monastery, 1502
- Born: 812; Aegina, Theme of Hellas, Byzantine Empire
- Died: 29 August 892; Thessalonica, Theme of Thessalonica, Byzantine Empire
- Venerated in: Eastern Orthodox Church
- Major shrine: Thessalonike
- Feast: 29 August

Theodora of Thessalonica (Greek: Θεοδώρα Θεσσαλονίκης; 812–892) was a Byzantine nun and saint from Aegina. Her hagiography is the longest ever written about a holy woman in Byzantine history. The Eastern Orthodox Church celebrates her feast day on 29 August.

== Biography ==
According to her biographer, Gregory the Presbyter, Theodora was a native of Aegina. Her father was a senior priest who later took monastic vows, her brother a deacon, and her sister a nun. At the age of seven, she learned to read a part of the Psalms and was then promised in marriage to a noble man of Aegina. Her early life was profoundly affected by the Arab raids of the ninth and tenth century that devastated the coastal areas of the Aegean. After her brother was killed in one of these raids, she emigrated with her husband and father to Thessalonica, possibly around 826. They moved here as they had several relatives in the city: Aikaterine, abbess of the convent of St. Luke; Anthony, Aikaterine's brother and later also briefly bishop of Thessalonica; Anna, abbess of the convent of St. Stephen; and her sister who was nun at St. Stephen.

Following the death of two of her children, Theodora vowed to dedicate her third child to the monastic life. This daughter, Theophiste, is described as being tonsured and joining the community of her aunt Aikaterina at the age of six, although this might be hagiographic exaggeration. Upon her husband's death in 837, Theodora divided her goods between the poor and the convent of St. Stephen the Protomartyr, which she then joined. She then had her daughter transferred to the same community. Mother and daughter were then tasked to work together for fifteen years, until Theophiste became the superior, and both continued to live in the monastery for twenty-four years more. Although Theodora did not perform any miracles during her lifetime, nor was known for extraordinary feats of asceticism, she was praised for her obedience, hard work and humility.

Theodora died on 29 August 892. Some time after she died, it was decided that her body should be translated from the communal tomb of the nuns to a separate sarcophagus. The hagiographer describes the scene similar to the tomb of Christ. According to Gregory, a group of priests and devout people arrived at the communal grave around midnight, and but by a miracle they were unable to roll the tomb stone away. Only after some prayers were they able to open the tomb and place her remains in a sarcophagus, from which then a fragrant and miraculous oil streamed forth. The hagiographer describes several other miracles, including the healing of his own sister, that happened after Theodora's death.

== Legacy ==
Most of her life is known from her biography, which was written not long after her death. The multilayered account on her life is the longest hagiographical biography about a holy woman in the Byzantium (around 20,000 words). It also embeds a short biography of Anthony the Confessor, archbishop of Thessalonica, and an anti-iconoclastic discourse spoken by him and addressed to Emperor Leo V the Armenian. The author included many chronological indications about the saint's life and appended to her life story and about the translation of her relics a list of posthumous miracles. Two versions of the Vita survive, one found in a twelfth-century Moscow manuscript and edited by bishop Arsenij, and the second preserved in a thirteenth or fourteenth century Vatican manuscript.

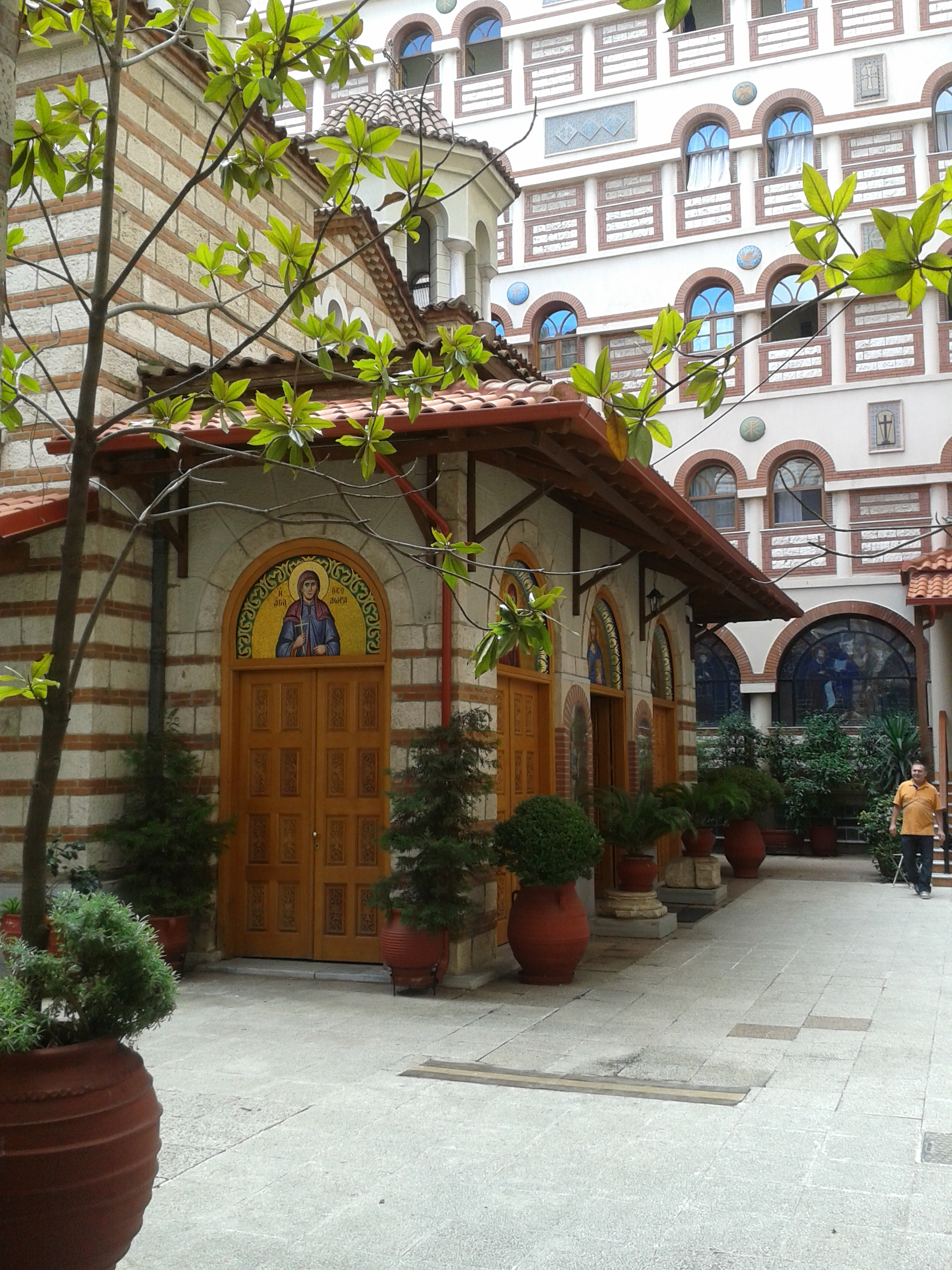
Saint Theodora Monastery in Thessaloniki

Later, during the Palaiologan dynasty, the chartophylax John Staurakos wrote a eulogy of St Demetrios and St. Theodora. According to George Sphrantzes, a nun at the nunnery of St. Theodora of Thessalonica called Palaiologina also composed canons honouring St. Teodora and St. Demetrios. It seems that these compositions were part of her personal devotion and not meant for a wider audience, which could indicate that a whole body of hymnography of female writers existed, of which few would have known.

A painting of her was made after her death in which she was depicted as young and beautiful. This is perhaps either to portray her as others remember her before she entered the nunnery at age 25, or perhaps to emphasize her purity, as the beauty of her body and pretty face were associated with modesty and piety. It could also show the sacrifice of her temporal life, or indicate that people preferred to venerate young and beautiful images.

Her cult continued during the time of the Turkish occupation, and it continues today in the modern church of St. Theodora, which is now part of a male monastery. In August 2010, archaeologists in Thessaloniki discovered a tomb that they tentatively identified as that of Theodora, as previously a large three-aisled basilica dedicated to Theodora had been found next to the tomb.

Though her feast day was originally on 29 August, it was moved to 3 August since it was coinciding with the beheading of John the Baptist.

== Sources ==
- Bakirtzis, Nikolas (24 February 2022). "Perceptions, histories and urban realities of Thessaloniki's layer". In Fowden, Elizabeth Key; Çağaptay, Suna; Zychowicz-Coghill, Edward; Blanke, Louise (eds.). Cities as Palimpsests?: Responses to Antiquity in Eastern Mediterranean Urbanism. Oxbow Books. ISBN 978-1-78925-769-4.
- Efthymiadis, Stephanos (28 July 2013). "Hagiography from the "Dark Age" to the Age of Symeon Metaphrastes (Eight-Tenth Centuries)". The Ashgate Research Companion to Byzantine Hagiography, Volume I: Periods and Places. Ashgate Publishing, Ltd. pp. 95–142. ISBN 978-1-4094-8268-0.
- Hennessy, Cecily (2 March 2017). Images of Children in Byzantium. Routledge. ISBN 978-1-351-92887-8.
- Garland, Lynda (23 May 2016). "'Till Death Do Us Part?': Family Life in Byzantine Monasteries". In Garland, Lynda (ed.). Questions of Gender in Byzantine Society. Routledge. pp. 29–56. ISBN 978-1-317-07233-1.
- Howard, Deborah (5 July 2017). Architecture and Pilgrimage, 1000–1500: Southern Europe and Beyond. Routledge. ISBN 978-1-351-57604-8.
- Kazhdan, Alexander (1991). "Theodora of Thessalonike". In Kazhdan, Alexander (ed.). The Oxford Dictionary of Byzantium. Oxford and New York: Oxford University Press. pp. 2038–2039. ISBN 0-19-504652-8.
- Mavroudi, Maria (28 October 2011). "Learned Women of Byzantium and the surviving Records". In Pastel, Popo (ed.). Byzantine Religious Culture: Studies in Honor of Alice-Mary Talbot. Brill. pp. 53–84. ISBN 978-90-04-22649-4.
- Neil, Bronwen (14 January 2021). Dreams and Divination from Byzantium to Baghdad, 400-1000 CE. Oxford University Press. ISBN 978-0-19-887114-9.
- Spyridopoulos, Elsa (27 August 2010). "Στο φως ο τάφος της Αγίας Θεοδώρας". Μακεδονία (in Greek). Archived from the original on 13 October 2010.
- Talbot, Alice-Mary (1996). "Life of St. Theodora of Thessalonike". Holy Women of Byzantium: Ten Saints' Lives in English Translation. Dumbarton Oaks. pp. 159–238. ISBN 978-0-88402-248-0.
- Talbot, Alice-Mary (28 July 2013). "Hagiography in Late Byzantium (1204–1453)". The Ashgate Research Companion to Byzantine Hagiography: Volume I: Periods and Places. Ashgate Publishing, Ltd. pp. 173–198. ISBN 978-1-4094-8268-0.
- "Venerable Theodora and her daughter Theopiste". www.oca.org. The Orthodox Church in America.
