= Navel gazing =

Meditation aid

Navel-gazing is the contemplation of one's navel as an aid to meditation. The word omphaloskepsis derives from the Ancient Greek words ὀμφᾰλός (omphalós, lit. 'navel') and σκέψῐς (sképsis, lit. 'viewing, examination, speculation').

Actual use of the practice as an aid to contemplation of basic principles of the cosmos and human nature is found in the practice of yoga or Hinduism and sometimes in the Eastern Orthodox Church. In yoga, the navel is the site of the manipura (also called nabhi) chakra, which yogis consider "a powerful chakra of the body". The monks of Mount Athos, Greece, were described as Omphalopsychians by J.G. Millingen, writing in the 1830s, who says they "...pretended or fancied that they experienced celestial joys when gazing on their umbilical region, in converse with the Deity".

== In Eastern Orthodox Christianity ==
"The Three Methods of Prayer", a text traditionally attributed to Symeon the New Theologian that was later included in the Philokalia, gives the following description of navel gazing:

Then sit down in a quiet cell, in a corner by yourself, and do what I tell you. Close the door, and withdraw your intellect from everything worthless and transient. Rest your beard on your chest, and focus your physical gaze, together with the whole of your intellect, upon the centre of your belly or your navel. Restrain the drawing-in of breath through your nostrils, so as not to breathe easily, and search inside yourself with your intellect so as to find the place of the heart, where all the powers of the soul reside. To start with you will find there darkness and an impenetrable density. Later, when you persist and practise this task day and night, you will find, as though miraculously, an unceasing joy.

== Contemporary usage ==
Phrases such as "contemplating one's navel" or "navel-gazing" are frequently used, usually in jocular fashion, to refer to self-absorbed pursuits.

== See also ==
- Hesychast controversy
- Kundalini
- Palamism
- Qigong
- Self-hypnosis
- Trance
