= Ignatios Glabas =

14th Century Greek Orthodox bishop

Ignatios Glabas (Greek: Ἰγνάτιος Γλαβᾶς) was the metropolitan bishop of Thessalonica between 1336 and 1341. He was also a contemporary of Nikephoros Gregoras.

== Sources ==
- Trapp, Erich; Beyer, Hans-Veit; Walther, Rainer; Sturm-Schnabl, Katja; Kislinger, Ewald; Leontiadis, Ioannis; Kaplaneres, Sokrates (1976–1996). Prosopographisches Lexikon der Palaiologenzeit (in German). Vienna: Verlag der Österreichischen Akademie der Wissenschaften. ISBN 3-7001-3003-1.
