= Eusebius of Thessalonica =

East Roman bishop

Eusebius (Greek: Εὐσέβιος) was a bishop of Thessalonica during the time of Pope Gregory the Great (590–604).

In the year 601, Pope Gregory wrote a letter to Eusebius about an affair regarding a monk in Rome named Andreas (Andrew). The monk allegedly had written works in Greek that contained various falsehoods and then made it appear like Gregory was the author of them. Because the works may have been disseminated in Thessalonica, Gregory asked Eusebius to search for them and destroy them. Gregory stated in the letter that he did not speak Greek, nor had he ever written anything in Greek.

Eusebius wrote a polemical work of 10 books against Andreas.
