= Michael Choumnos =

Michael Choumnos or Chumnus (Greek: Μιχαήλ Χοῦμνος) was a Byzantine jurist and canonist, who was nomophylax, and afterwards Metropolitan of Thessalonica. He lived in the 12th century, and is said to have been the author of various works.
