= Manuel Kalekas =

Byzantine theologian (?-1410)

Manuel Kalekas (died 1410) was a monk and theologian of the Byzantine Empire.

Kalekas was a disciple of Demetrios Kydones. He lived in Italy, Crete and Lesbos where he translated the works of Boethius and Anselm of Canterbury into Greek, and several Latin liturgical Texts such as the Missa Ambrosiana in Nativitate Domini. Kalekas translated the Comma Johanneum into Greek from the Vulgate.

Kalekas was a unionist who sought to reconcile the Eastern and Western Churches. In 1390, he wrote a work castigating the Byzantines for their separation from the Western Church.

When he was summoned to subscribe to the Tome of Palamas (the official statement of orthodoxy issued in 1351 at the Council of Blachernae), as a result of his anti-Palamite writings, he refused to do and was sanctioned. He fled to Pera, the Genoese quarter of Constantinople, in order to avoid prosecution. In 1396 he wrote a letter reproaching Manuel II, which the Emperor answered with bitterness.

Kalekas returned to Constantinople in 1403 with the emperor Manuel II Palaiologos, but to his surprise, was not given a warm reception by his old friends. As a result, he was forced to seek refuge with the Dominicans at Mytilene, where he died in 1410.

== See also ==
- Byzantine scholars in Renaissance
