= Theophanes Kerameus =

Theophanes Kerameus (Greek: Θεοφάνης Κεραμεῦς) (fl. 1129–1152) was bishop of Rossano, in Calabria, Italy, and a celebrated homiletic writer.

His sermons, ninety-one of which are known in manuscript, are mostly exegetical, and written in Greek, which was then still extensively spoken in Sicily and Southern Italy. They are simple and natural, and are masterpieces of oratorical skill, lucid and unforced expositions of biblical texts.

They were first edited, together with a Latin translation and extensive annotations, by Francesco Scorso (Paris, 1644), which edition is reprinted in Patrologia Graeca, CXXXII, 125-1078. A new edition was prepared by Gregory Palamas (Jerusalem, 1860).

The fact that various other individuals also bore the surname "Kerameus" has given rise to a controversy concerning the authorship of these homilies. Scorso, their first editor, supposed Theophanes Kerameus to have lived in the ninth century and to have been Bishop of Taormina in Sicily. Pierre Batiffol, in his work entitled "L'abbaye de Rossano" (Paris, 1891), XXXI, 36-56, held that part of the homilies were written by the Calabrian monk John Philagathos, a disciple of Bartholomaeus of Grottaferrata (d. c. 1050).
