= Mystical realism =

In philosophy, mystical realism is a view concerning the nature of the divine. It aims to find the fitting equilibrium involving the combination of the spiritual and the material.

== Concept ==
The philosophical use of the term originated with the Russian philosopher Nikolai Alexandrovich Berdyaev in his published article, titled Decadentism and Mystical Realism. Mystical realism holds that divine entities are not accurately described in terms of space, matter, time, or causation, and so they, despite being real by the philosophy, do not exist. The concept has two components: a metaphysical and an epistemological. The metaphysical component rests on a distinction between the concepts "real" and "exist". Something exists if it:

1. occupies space;
2. has matter;
3. is in time;
4. is affected by causation.

Mystical realism also favors participation instead of individualization where the individual participates in the universal and the knower participates in the known. Regarding worship, this philosophy cites the altar as a place in the temporal world where the opposition between the Divine and the human is overcome.

== Interpretations ==
Mystical realism is evident in the political ideology of the 16th and 17th centuries in Russia, particularly in the attempt to find sacred meaning in the authority of the Tsar. The ecclesiastical thought that emerged during this period drew from mystical realism in the way it resulted to meditations on the concept of the so-called secret history, which pertained to the expectation of a mysterious and sacred aspect to an external historical reality.

George Barker Stevens used the term mystical realism to describe Saint Paul's form of thought, particularly in the way he treated race and Adam. Here, race is associated with the sinners while Adam is identified with the believer. The mystical component articulates the sense of being unique, vital and inscrutable while realism is used to denote the sinful humanity considered as present and a participant in Adam's sin.

== See also ==
- Christian existentialism
- List of Russian philosophers
- Orthodox Christian theology
- Philosophical theology
- Transtheism
