= Metropolis of Thessaloniki =

Metropolis of Thessaloniki Ιερά Μητρόπολις Θεσσαλονίκης
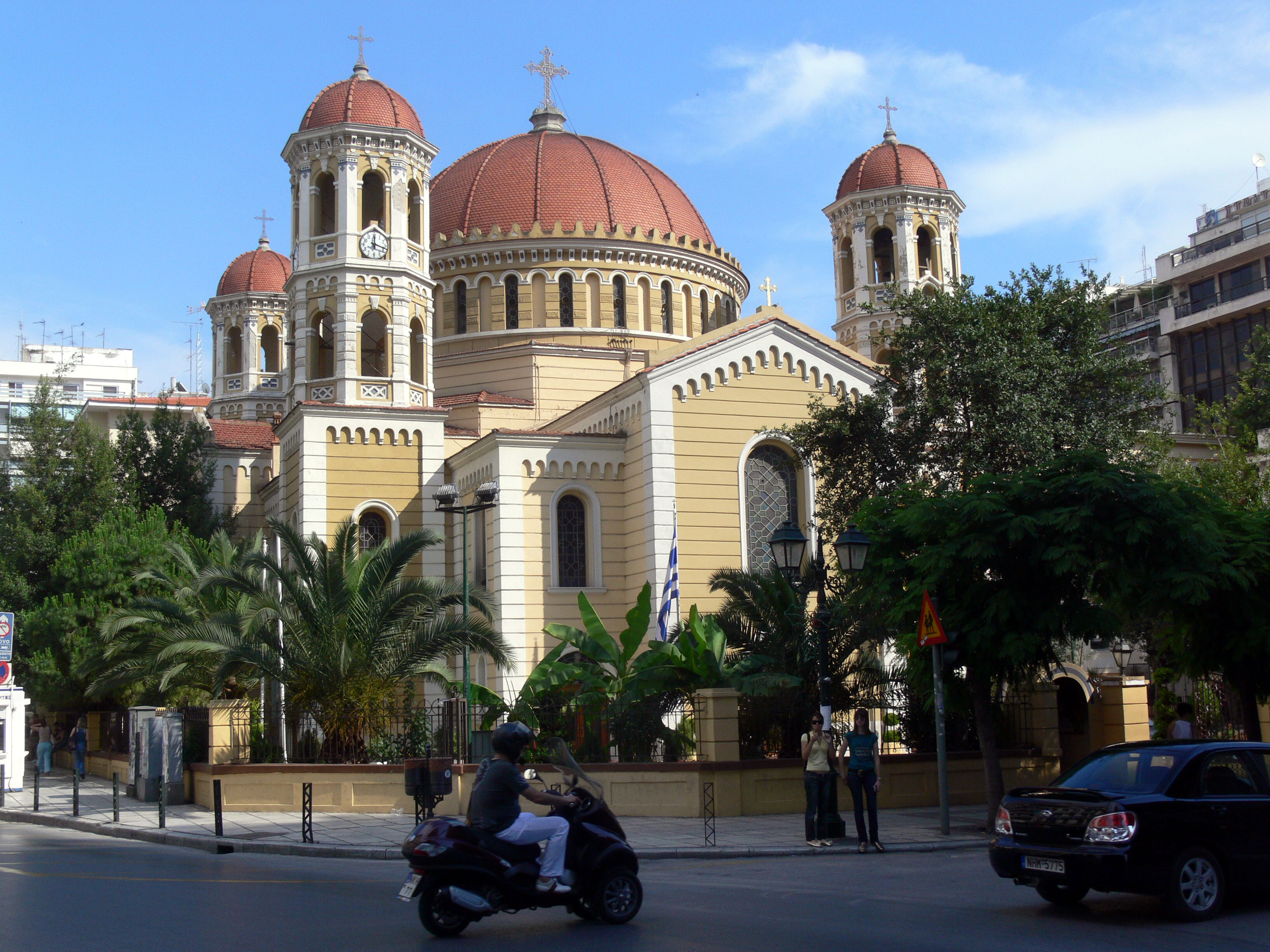
- St Gregory Palamas Metropolitan Cathedral

Location
- Ecclesiastical province: Thessaloniki

Statistics
- Parishes: 43

Information
- Cathedral: St Gregory Palamas Metropolitan Cathedral

Current leadership
- Bishop: Filotheos Theocharis

Website
- https://imth.gr

The Metropolis of Thessaloniki (Greek: Ιερά Μητρόπολις Θεσσαλονίκης) is a Greek Orthodox metropolitan see based in the city of Thessaloniki in Central Macedonia, Greece. It is part of the so-called "New Lands", belonging to the jurisdiction of the Ecumenical Patriarchate of Constantinople but being administered by the Church of Greece. The see traces its history to its foundation by the Apostle Paul in the 1st century. Since 2023, the incumbent metropolitan is Filotheos Theocharis.

== History ==
In its early centuries, the see of Thessaloniki became the metropolitan diocese of the Roman province of Macedonia. After the creation of major ecclesiastical jurisdictions, the see of Thessalonica was subordinated to the patriarch of Rome, rising to become the archbishopric of the Eastern Illyricum. Archbishopric of Justiniana Prima, covering modern day Serbia, Montenegro and western Bulgaria, was detached in 535. Roman control—and the use of Latin as a liturgical language—continued until c. 733, when the see was transferred to the jurisdiction of the patriarch of Constantinople. Under Constantinople, it was reduced in status to a "simple" metropolitan see, with 5 to 12 suffragan sees, although the metropolitans continued to use the title of "archbishop" as well.

== List of bishops ==
Name	Name in Greek	Tenure	Notes	Refs
Gaius	Γάιος		Saint	
Nicholas I	Νικόλαος Α΄	160	Saint	
Artemius	Ἀρτέμιος		Saint	
Alexander I	Ἀλέξανδρος Α΄	305–335	Saint	
John I	Ἰωάννης Α΄			
Aetius	Ἀέτιος	342–347		
Irenius	Εἰρήνιος	355		
Paulinus	Παυλῖνος			
Acholius or Ascholius	Ἀχόλιος, Ἀσχόλιος	379–384	Saint	
Anysius	Ἀνύσιος	384–407	Saint; Division of the Roman Empire in 395	
Rufus	Ῥοῦφος	407–434	Saint	
Anastasius I	Ἀναστάσιος Α΄	434–451	Saint	
Auxitheus, Eudoxius	Αὐξίθεος, Εὐδόξιος	451–458	Saint	
Andrew	Ἀνδρέας	481–494	Saint	
Dorotheus I	Δωρόθεος Α΄	494–520	Saint	
Aristides	Ἀριστείδης	520–535		
Elias	Ἠλίας	553	Saint, Participant in the Second Council of Constantinople	
Thalaleus	Θαλαλεὺς			
Theodosius I	Θεοδόσιος Α΄	585		
Eusebius	Εὐσέβιος	585–603		
John II	Ἰωάννης Β΄	603–610	Saint, author of Book I of the Miracles of Saint Demetrius	
Plotinus	Πλωτῖνος	616		
John II	Ἰωάννης Β΄	617–626	Saint	
Paul I	Παῦλος Α΄	649		
John III	Ἰωάννης Γ΄	680	Participant in the Third Council of Constantinople	
Sergius	Σέργιος	690	Participant in the Quinisext Council	
Constantine I	Κωνσταντῖνος Α΄			
Peter	Πέτρος	before 754		
Anastasius	Ἀναστάσιος	after 754		
Basil I	Βασίλειος Α΄	772		
Theophilus	Θεόφιλος	787	Saint; Participant in the Second Council of Nicaea	
Thomas	Θωμᾶς		Saint	
Joseph I the Studite	Ἰωσὴφ Α΄, ὁ στουδίτης	807–809	Saint; brother of Theodore the Studite	
Unknown		809–811		
Joseph I the Studite	Ἰωσὴφ Α΄, ὁ στουδίτης	811–821	Saint; brother of Theodore the Studite	
Leo the Philosopher	Λέων, ὁ φιλόσοφος	839/840–843		
Anthony the Confessor	Ἀντώνιος, ὁ ὁμολογητὴς	843	Saint	
Basil II	Βασίλειος Β΄	843–865		
Theodore	Θεόδωρος	866–869		
Paul II	Παῦλος Β΄	880–882		
Gregory I	Γρηγόριος Α΄	882		
Methodius	Μεθόδιος	889		
John IV the Thessalian	Ἰωάννης Δ΄, ὁ Θεσσαλὸς	892–904		
Basil III the Confessor	Βασίλειος Γ΄, ὁ ὁμολογητὴς	904–?	Saint	
Anatolius	Ἀνατόλιος			
Isidore I	Ἰσίδωρος Α΄	1016		
Nicetas I	Νικήτας Α΄			
Theophanes I	Θεοφάνης Α΄	1031–1038		
Prometheus	Προμηθεὺς	1038		
Unknown		1063		
Theodulus	Θεόδουλος	1086–1107		
Constantine II	Κωνσταντῖνος Β΄	1110		
Michael I	Μιχαὴλ Α΄	1122		
Nicetas II	Νικήτας Β΄	1133		
Constantine	Κωνσταντῖνος	after 1133		
Leo	Λέων			
Romanus	Ρωμανός			
Basil IV of Ohrid	Βασίλειος Δ΄, ὁ Ἀχρίδος	1145–1168		
Eustathius	Εὐστάθιος, ὁ Κατάφλωρος	1175–1197 ή 1198	Saint	
Constantine III Mesopotamites	Κωνσταντῖνος Γ΄, ὁ Μεσοποταμίτης	1198–1199		
Chrysanthus	Χρύσανθος	1199–1202		
Constantine III Mesopotamites	Κωνσταντῖνος Γ΄,ὁ Μεσοποταμίτης	1204–1224	in exile; Thessaloniki under Latin control	
Nicetas III	Νικήτας Γ΄			
Joseph II	Ἰωσὴφ Β΄	1232–1235		
Michael II Palatanos	Μιχαὴλ Β΄, ὁ Παλατάνος	1235		
Manuel	Μανουὴλ	1258–1261		
Joannicius Kydones	Ἰωαννίκιος, ὁ Κυδώνης	1261		
Demetrius	Δημήτριος	1282–1285		
Ignatius I	Ἰγνάτιος Α΄	1285–?		
James I	Ἰάκωβος Α΄	1299		
Jeremy	Ἱερεμίας	1315–1322		
Euphemianus	Εὐφημιανὸς	1322		
John V Kalekas	Ἰωάννης Ε΄, ὁ Καλέκας	1322–1334	Patriarch of Constantinople	
Gregory II	Γρηγόριος Β’	1334		
Glabas	Γλαβᾶς	1336–1341		
Macarius I	Μακάριος Α΄	1342–1346		
Gregory III Palamas	Γρηγόριος Γ΄, ὁ Παλαμᾶς	1347–1359	Saint	
Neilos Kabasilas	Νεῖλος, ὁ Καβάσιλας	1360–1361	Saint	
Nicholas II Kabasilas	Νικόλαος Β΄, ὁ Καβάσιλας	1361–1363	Saint	
Unknown		1363–1371		
Dorotheus II	Δωρόθεος Β΄	1371–1379		
Isidore II Glabas	Ἰσίδωρος Β΄, ὁ Γλαβᾶς	1379–1393	Saint; Thessaloniki under Ottoman control	
Gabriel I	Γαβριὴλ Α΄	1393–1410	Saint; Thessaloniki returns to Byzantine control	
Symeon the Mystic	Συμεών, ὁ μυσταγωγός	1410–1429	Saint	
Gregory III	Γρηγόριος Γ΄	1430	Thessaloniki finally under Ottoman control	
Nephon	Νήφων	1450–1484	Saint, Patriarch of Constantinople	
Macarius II	Μακάριος Β΄	1517–1536		
Theonas	Θεωνᾶς, ὁ ἀπὸ Ἡγουμένων	1539	Saint	
Theophanes II	Θεοφάνης Β΄	1544		
Gregory-David	Γρηγόριος–Δαβὶδ			
Joasaph I	Ἰωάσαφ Α΄	1560–1578		
Metrophanes	Μητροφάνης	1585		
Gabriel II	Γαβριὴλ Β΄	1594	Patriarch of Constantinople	
Matthew I	Ματθαῖος Α΄	1596		
Joasaph II Argyropoulos	Ἰωάσαφ Β΄, ὁ Ἀργυρόπουλος	1596		
Sophronius I	Σωφρόνιος Α΄	1606		
Zosimas	Ζωσιμᾶς	1607		
Parthenius	Παρθένιος	1611		
Athanasios I	Ἀθανάσιος Α΄	1622–1634	Saint, Patriarch of Constantinople	
Damascenus I	Δαμασκηνὸς Α΄	1634–1636		
Callinicus I	Καλλίνικος Α΄	1636–1639		
Theocletus	Θεόκλητος	1645–1651		
Joachim I	Ἰωακεὶμ Α΄	1651–1666		
Dionysius	Διονύσιος	1666–1671	Patriarch of Constantinople	
Anastasius II	Ἀναστάσιος Β	1671		
Meletius I	Μελέτιος Α΄	1672–1684		
Methodius	Μεθόδιος	1687–1696		
Ignatius II	Ἰγνάτιος Β΄	1698–1712		
James II	Ἰάκωβος Β΄	1712		
Ignatius II	Ἰγνάτιος Β΄	1723		
Ananias	Ἀνανίας	1728		
Joachim II	Ἰωακεὶμ Β΄	1734–1744		
Gabriel III	Γαβριὴλ Γ΄	1745–1752		
Spyridon	Σπυρίδων	1760–1761		
Neophytus I	Νεόφυτος Α΄	1767		
Theodosius II	Θεοδόσιος Β΄	1767–1769	Patriarch of Constantinople	
Damascenus II	Δαμασκηνὸς Β΄	1769–1780		
James III	Ἰάκωβος Γ΄	1780		
Gerasimus	Γεράσιμος	1788–1815		
Joseph III the Hieromartyr	Ἰωσὴφ Γ΄, ὁ Ἱερομάρτυς	1815–1821	Saint	
Matthew II	Ματθαῖος Β΄	1821–1824		
Macarius III	Μακάριος Γ΄	1824–1830		
Meletius II	Μελέτιος Β΄	1830–1841	Patriarch of Constantinople	
Hieronymus	Ἱερώνυμος	1841–1853		
Callinicus II	Καλλίνικος Β΄	1853–1861	Patriarch of Alexandria	
Neophytus II	Νεόφυτος Β΄	1861–1874		
Joachim III	Ἰωακεὶμ Γ΄	1874–1878	Patriarch of Constantinople	
Callinicus III Fotiadis	Καλλίνικος Γ΄, ὁ Φωτιάδης	1878–1884		
Gregory IV Kallidis	Γρηγόριος Δ΄, ὁ Καλλίδης	1885–1889	Saint	
Sophronius II	Σωφρόνιος Β΄	1889–1893		
Athanasius II Megaklis	Ἀθανάσιος Β΄, ὁ Μεγακλῆς	1893–1903		
Alexander II Rigopoulos	Ἀλέξανδρος Β΄, ὁ Ῥηγόπουλος	1903–1910		
Joachim IV Sgouros	Ἰωακεὶμ Δ΄, ὁ Σγουρὸς	1910–1912		
Gennadios Alexiadis	Γεννάδιος, ὁ Ἀλεξιάδης	1912–1951	Thessaloniki comes under Greek control	
Panteleimon I Papageorgiou	Παντελεήμων Α΄, ὁ Παπαγεωργίου	1951–1968		
Leonidas Paraskevopoulos	Λεωνίδας, ὁ Παρασκευόπουλος	1968–1974		
Panteleimon II Chrysofakis	Παντελεήμων Β΄, ὁ Χρυσοφάκης	1974–2003		
Anthimos Rousas	Ἄνθιμος, ὁ Ῥούσας	2004–2023		
Filotheos Theocharis	Φιλόθεος, ὁ Θεοχάρης	2023 -		

== Sources ==
- Nesbitt, John; Oikonomides, Nicolas, eds. (1991). Catalogue of Byzantine Seals at Dumbarton Oaks and in the Fogg Museum of Art, Volume 1: Italy, North of the Balkans, North of the Black Sea. Vol. 1. Washington, DC: Dumbarton Oaks Research Library and Collection. ISBN 0-88402-194-7.
- Gouillard, J. (1967). "Le Synodikon de L'orthodoxie: Édition et Commentaire". Travaux et Mémoires 2. pp. 1–316.
- Kiminas, Demetrius (2009). The Ecumenical Patriarchate: A History of Its Metropolitanates with Annotated Hierarch Catalogs. Wildside Press LLC. ISBN 9781434458766.
