= Neilos Kabasilas =

14th-century Greek Palamite theologian

- Born: Nikolaos Kabasilas c. 1290; Thessalonica, Byzantine Empire
- Died: c. 1363; Constantinople, Byzantine Empire
- Relatives: Nicholas Kabasilas (nephew)

Education
- Academic advisor: Gregory Palamas

Philosophical work
- Era: Medieval philosophy
- Region: Western philosophy
- School: Hesychasm
- Notable students: Demetrios Kydones
- Main interests: Theology
- Notable ideas: Defense of Palamism

Neilos Kabasilas (also Nilus Cabasilas; Greek: Νεῖλος Καβάσιλας Neilos Kavasilas; born Nikolaos Kabasilas; c. 1290 – 1363) was a Byzantine theologian who succeeded Gregory Palamas as Metropolitan of Thessalonica (1361–1363). Kabasilas was a Palamite.

Neilos was a teacher of the famed translator Demetrios Kydones. As a theologian, his most important works are a Theological Rule in defense of the essence-energies distinction and a series of discourses against the Filioque (the Latin teaching on the procession of the Holy Spirit).

Neilos, who was called Nicholas as a layman, has often been confused with his nephew, the more famous Nicholas Kabasilas, best known for his Commentary on the Divine Liturgy.
