= Liber Memorialis =

Ancient history book in Latin

The Liber Memorialis is an ancient book in Latin featuring an extremely concise summary—a kind of index—of universal history from earliest times to the reign of Trajan. It was written by Lucius Ampelius, who was possibly a tutor or schoolmaster.

== Description ==
The book is dedicated to a Macrinus, who may have been the emperor who reigned 217–218, but that name was not uncommon, and it seems more likely he was simply a young man with a thirst for universal knowledge, which the book was compiled to satisfy.

The book's object and scope are indicated in its dedication:

Since you desire to know everything, I have written this 'book of notes,' that you may learn of what the universe and its elements consist, what the world contains, and what the human race has done.

The Liber Memorialis seems to have been intended as a textbook to be learned by heart. This little work, in fifty chapters, gives a sketch of cosmography, geography, mythology (Chapters I-X), and history (Chapters X to end). The historical portion, dealing mainly with the republican period, is untrustworthy and the text in many places corrupt; the earlier chapters are more valuable, and contain some interesting information.

Chapter VIII (Miracula Mundi) contains the following, the only reference by an ancient writer to the famous sculptures of the Pergamon Altar, which were discovered in 1871, excavated in 1878, and are now in Berlin:

At Pergamum there is a great marble altar, 40 feet (12 m) high, with colossal sculptures, representing a battle of the giants

== Date ==
Nothing is known of the date at which the work was written; the times of Trajan, Hadrian, Antoninus Pius, the beginning of the 3rd century have all been suggested. However, in Chapter V De Orbe Terrarum (The World), Ampelius refers to the "Tigris and Euphrates in Parthia," which suggests that Ampelius wrote before the Sassanians overthrew the Parthians in 224.

== Editions ==
The first edition of the Liber Memorialis was published in 1638 by Claudius Salmasius (Saumaise) from the Dijon manuscript, now lost, together with the Epitome of Florus. An 1873 edition by Wölfflin was based on Salmasius's copy of the lost codex. The more recent editions are:

- Erwin Assmann's Teubner edition of 1935
- Nicola Terzaghi's edition, published by Chiantore in Turin ca. 1947 (preface dated 1943)
- Marie-Pierre Arnaud-Lidet's 1993 edition for the Collection Budé (includes French translation)
