= Demetrios Kydones =

Byzantine statesman and theologian (1324–1398)

- Δημήτριος Κυδώνης
- Born: 1324; Thessalonica
- Died: 1398 (aged 73–74); Crete
- Relatives: Prochoros Kydones (brother)

Education
- Academic advisor: Neilos Kabasilas

Philosophical work
- Era: Medieval philosophy
- Region: Western philosophy
- School: Thomism
- Notable students: Gemistus Pletho

Demetrios Kydones (Latinized as Demetrius Cydones or Demetrius Cydonius; Greek: Δημήτριος Κυδώνης; 1324–1398), was a Byzantine Catholic theologian, translator, author and statesman. He served an unprecedented three terms as Mesazon (Imperial Prime Minister or Chancellor) of the Byzantine Empire under three successive emperors: John VI Kantakouzenos, John V Palaiologos and Manuel II Palaiologos.

As Imperial Premier, Kydones' West-Politik effort during his second and third stints was to bring about a reconciliation of the Eastern Orthodox and Catholic Churches, in order to cement a military alliance against the ever-encroaching Islamic conquests, a program that culminated in John V Palaiologos' reconciliation with Catholicism.

His younger brother and somewhat-collaborator in his efforts was the noted anti-Palamite theologian Prochoros Kydones.

== Career ==
=== First Premiership ===
Kydones was initially a student of the Greek classical scholar, philosopher and Palamite Nilos Kabasilas. Emperor John VI Kantakouzenos, a staunch follower of Palamism, the Hesychast doctrine of Gregory Palamas, had befriended Demetrios Kydones as a young man and had employed him as his Imperial Premier or Mesazon (1347–1354) at the age of 23; at the Emperor's request, Kydones began to translate Western polemical works against Islam, such as the writings of the Dominican Ricoldo da Monte Croce, from Latin into Greek, and which the Emperor John VI Kantakouzenos used as references in his own writings against Muhammad and Islam (although his own daughter was married to the Turkish Muslim Emir Orhan of Bithynia). At Emperor John VI Kantakouzenos' urging, Kydones acquired knowledge of Latin, and learned to speak, read and write it well. This led Kydones to undertake a deeper study of Latin theology, particularly Thomas Aquinas, and he attempted to introduce his compatriots to Thomistic scholasticism by translating some of Aquinas' writings into Greek. John VI Kantakouzenos also encouraged him in his Latin studies and he himself read some Thomist literature. However, this put Demetrios Kydones on a journey that eventually ended with his conversion to Catholicism.

Anxious to concentrate on his Latin studies, Kydones retired for a time to private life from the Imperial Premiership in 1354, just before John V Palaiologos succeeded in ousting John VI Kantakouzenos.

When Kydones entered the service of Emperor John V Palaiologos, as he soon did, he remained friendly to his former employer Emperor John VI Kantakouzenos. On the other hand, he found himself unable or unwilling to follow the Palamist doctrine espoused by John VI Kantakouzenos.

His younger brother Prochoros Kydones was a monk on Mount Athos, and he too learned Latin, but did not follow Demetrios to Rome. Prochoros admired and translated some of the works of Augustine of Hippo and Thomas Aquinas, but parted company with Kantakouzenos by becoming an argumentative anti-Palamite.

On retiring from public office in 1354, Demetrios Kydones went to Italy where he studied the writings of the leading medieval philosophical theologians, and made Greek translations of the major works of Western writers, including tracts by Augustine of Hippo (5th century) and Thomas Aquinas' Summa theologica. He also realized the first two Greek translations of the Quaestiones disputatae, De potentia, De spiritualibus creaturis, and the Summa contra Gentiles, the latter translate on behalf of the theologian emperor John VI Kantakouzenos. By 1365 he had made a profession of faith in the Catholic Church.

=== Second Premiership ===
In 1369, Emperor John V Palaiologos recalled Kydones to Constantinople and named him Imperial Prime Minister or Mesazon, the second time he held this position, 1369–1383. At the same time, Patriarch Philotheos Kokkinos of Constantinople was removed and his deposed predecessor Patriarch Kallistos of Constantinople restored.

In the spring of 1369 John V Palaiologos set sail from Constantinople with Demetrios Kydones and Francesco I Gattilusio. The destination was Italy; their immediate goal was to meet with Pope Urban V and his cardinals in Rome. The purpose of that extraordinary journey, however, and the subsequent meetings between Pope and Emperor in the fall of that year, was twofold: to assure Pope Urban V that the Byzantine Emperor was no longer a schismatic, and to persuade the Pope and his Curia to support a new military initiative that would aid the Byzantines in fending off the ever-increasing threat to the Empire from the Ottoman Turks.

Kydones' efforts culminated in Emperor John V's profession of faith as a Catholic in the presence of the Pope and cardinals in Rome on October 18, 1369.

However, with the weakening of Byzantine resistance to the Turks, Kydones retired to private life about 1383. In 1390 he journeyed to Venice, which helped introduce Greek culture to Italy, and is credited with fostering the nascent Renaissance. He formed, moreover, the nucleus of a group of Byzantine intellectuals that strove to propagate Uniatism.

=== Third Premiership ===
Recalled to Constantinople in 1391 by his former pupil Emperor Manuel II Palaiologos, the son of Emperor John V Palaiologos, Kydones resumed the position of Prime Minister ("Mesazon"), but in 1396 hostility to his Catholicism compelled him to retire permanently to the island of Crete, then ruled by the Venetians. He died there the following year, in 1398.

=== Anti-Palamism ===
With the support of his younger brother Prochoros, Demetrios opposed as polytheistic or pantheistic the Palamites' commitment to hesychasm (Greek, silence or stillness), at the time a controversial practice of mystical contemplation through uninterrupted prayer, taught by the Orthodox monks of Mount Athos and articulated by the 14th-century ascetic theologian Gregory Palamas. Applying Aristotelian logic to hesychasm (sometimes claimed by Latin critics to be rooted in Platonism), the Kydones brothers accused Palamas of promoting pantheism or polytheism, only to be condemned themselves by three successive synods that concurred with Palamas' theology and affirmed hesychastic practice. He is the author of the moral philosophical essay De contemnenda morte ("On Despising Death"), an Apologia for his conversion to Catholicism, and a voluminous collection of 447 letters, valuable for the history of Byzantine relations with the West.

One of the principal documentary sources for the Eastern Roman Empire's gradual submission to the Turks is Kydones' Symbouleutikoi ("Exhortations"), urging the Byzantine people to unite with the Latins in order to resist the Turkish onslaught.

== Against the Greek Schism ==
Kydones' most famous statement against the Greeks who opposed his efforts at reuniting the East and the West is from his Apologia:

"So when someone comes along and says the Pope is in error and everyone ought to abjure such error, we really have been given no proof for such an allegation, and it makes no sense for anyone to pass judgment on what has first to be proven. What is more, we will not succeed in finding out why and by whom the Pope is to be judged, no matter how earnestly we try. But aside from the prospect that the one who has the Primacy in the Church is in error, what confidence can be placed in those of lower rank? If we continue to carry on like this, all shepherds of the Christian people will become suspect because what we accuse the Head Shepherd of is even more likely to befall all those who are less than he. Would not every matter of faith have to end with a question mark if there indeed be no final seat of authority in the Church? There can be no certitude anywhere, if none is worthy of credibility. Then we are no longer talking about the religion which St. Paul described as one; rather there will be as many religions as there are leaders, or worse still, none at all! Every believer will suspect everyone else and will proceed to pick and choose whatever belief suits him. Then, as in a battle fought in the dark, we will be striking at our own friends, and they at us. How the non-believers will enjoy our antics, because we Christians are now engaged in endless bickering among ourselves, since none of us wants to concede anything to anyone else. The whole missionary effort to spread Christian beliefs will be stopped in its tracks since no one will pay any attention to those who cannot even agree among themselves."

== Bibliography ==
- Ευάγγελος Κ. Πριγκιπάκη (2022). Ο Δημήτριος Κυδώνης και η Εποχή του. Μελέτη του Βίου και του Συγγραφικού του Έργου με έμφαση στην Επιστολογραφία του [Demetrius Cydones and his Times. A Study of his Life and his Writings with emphasis on his Correspondence]. Thessaloniki: Σταμούλης. Earlier version of the work online.
