= Apophatic theology =

Way of describing the divine by explaining what God is not

Apophatic theology, also known as negative theology and the Via Negativa, is a form of theological thinking and religious practice which attempts to approach God, the Divine, by negation, to speak only in terms of what may not be said about God. It is the opposite equivalent of cataphatic theology (also known as affirmative theology), which approaches God or the Divine by affirmations or positive statements about what God is. (Note: Living Without a Why. An Interview with Deirdre Carabine. Holos: Forum for a New Worldview, Vol. 5, No. 1 (2009).)

The apophatic tradition is often, though not always, allied with the approach of mysticism, which aims at the vision of God, the perception of the divine reality beyond the realm of ordinary perception.

== Etymology and definition ==
"Apophatic" derives from Ancient Greek: ἀπόφασις (noun); from ἀπόφημι apophēmi, meaning 'to deny'. From Online Etymology Dictionary:

apophatic (adj.) "involving a mention of something one feigns to deny; involving knowledge obtained by negation", 1850, from Latinized form of Greek apophatikos, from apophasis "denial, negation", from apophanai "to speak off," from apo "off, away from" (see apo-) + phanai "to speak," related to pheme "voice," from PIE root *bha- (2) "to speak, tell, say." (Note: Online Etymology Dictionary: "apophatic".)

Via negativa or via negationis is Latin for 'negative way' or 'by way of denial'. The negative way forms a pair together with the kataphatic or positive way. According to Deirdre Carabine,

Pseudo Dionysius describes the kataphatic or affirmative way to the divine as the "way of speech": that we can come to some understanding of the Transcendent by attributing all the perfections of the created order to God as its source. In this sense, we can say "God is Love", "God is Beauty", "God is Good".

The apophatic or negative way stresses God's absolute transcendence and unknowability in such a way that we cannot say anything about the divine essence because God is so totally beyond being. The dual concept of the immanence and transcendence of God can help us to understand the simultaneous truth of both "ways" to God: at the same time as God is immanent, God is also transcendent. At the same time as God is knowable, God is also unknowable. God cannot be thought of as one or the other only.

In literary and rhetorical analysis, such claims about the inadequacy of language are often discussed under the Topos of ineffability (German: Unsagbarkeitstopos).

== Origins and development ==
According to philosophy professor Michael Fagenblat, "negative theology is as old as philosophy itself": elements of the idea can be found in Plato's unwritten doctrines, while it is also present in Neo-Platonic, Gnostic and early Christian writers. A tendency to apophatic thought can also be found in Philo of Alexandria.

According to Dirdre Carabine, "apophasis proper" in Greek thought starts with Neo-Platonism, with its speculations about the nature of the One, culminating in the works of Proclus. Carabine writes that there are two major points in the development of apophatic theology, namely the fusion of the Jewish tradition with Platonic philosophy in the writings of Philo, and the works of Pseudo-Dionysius the Areopagite, who infused Christian thought with Neo-Platonic ideas.

The Early Church Fathers were influenced by Philo, and Anthony Meredith even states that Philo "is the real founder of the apophatic tradition". Yet, it was with Pseudo-Dionysius the Areopagite and Maximus the Confessor, whose writings shaped both Hesychasm (the contemplative monastic tradition of the Eastern Orthodox Churches) and the mystical traditions of western Europe, that apophatic theology became a central element of Christian theology and contemplative practice.

Elijah's hearing of a "still, small voice" at 1 Kings 19:11–13 has been proposed as a Biblical example of apophatic prayer.

== Greek philosophy ==
=== Pre-Socratic ===
For the ancient Greeks, knowledge of the gods was essential for proper worship. Poets had an important responsibility in this regard, and a central question was how knowledge of the Divine forms can be attained. Epiphany played an essential role in attaining this knowledge. Xenophanes (c. 570 – c. 475 BC) noted that the knowledge of the Divine forms is restrained by the human imagination, and Greek philosophers realized that this knowledge can only be mediated through myth and visual representations, which are culture-dependent.

According to Herodotus (484–425 BC), Homer and Hesiod (between 750 and 650 BC) taught the Greek the knowledge of the Divine bodies of the Gods. The ancient Greek poet Hesiod (between 750 and 650 BC) describes in his Theogony the birth of the gods and creation of the world, (Note: ellopsos.net, Plato's TIMAEUS : Visible and created Gods. Timaeus 39e-41d (primary source).) which became an "ur-text for programmatic, first-person epiphanic narratives in Greek literature", (Note: Hesiod's Theogony was highly referred in the time of Plato (428/427 or 424/423 – 348/347 BCE), and Plato's Timaeus shows a profound familiarity with Hesiod's Theogony. See also Timaeus e39–e41.) but also "explores the necessary limitations placed on human access to the divine". According to Platt, the statement of the Muses who grant Hesiod knowledge of the Gods "actually accords better with the logic of apophatic religious thought". (Note: Richard G. Geldard: "[M]ore than any other pre-Socratic thinker, Heraclitus embodies the apophatic method. He 'unsaid' the myths of the Archaic tradition on his way to transforming the ideas of divinity through the divine Logos. It was a transformation affirmed by Plotinus 800 years later.")

Parmenides (fl. late sixth or early fifth century BC), in his poem On Nature, gives an account of a revelation on two ways of inquiry. "The way of conviction" explores Being, true reality ('what-is'), which is 'What is ungenerated and deathless,/whole and uniform, and still and perfect.'" "The way of opinion" is the world of appearances, in which one's sensory faculties lead to conceptions which are false and deceitful. His distinction between unchanging Truth and shifting opinion is reflected in Plato's allegory of the Cave. Together with the Biblical story of Moses's ascent of Mount Sinai, it is used by Gregory of Nyssa and Pseudo-Dionysius the Areopagite to give a Christian account of the ascent of the soul toward God. Cook notes that Parmenides' poem is a religious account of a mystical journey, akin to the mystery cults, giving a philosophical form to a religious outlook. Cook further notes that the philosopher's task is to "attempt through 'negative' thinking to tear themselves loose from all that frustrates their pursuit of wisdom".

=== Plato ===
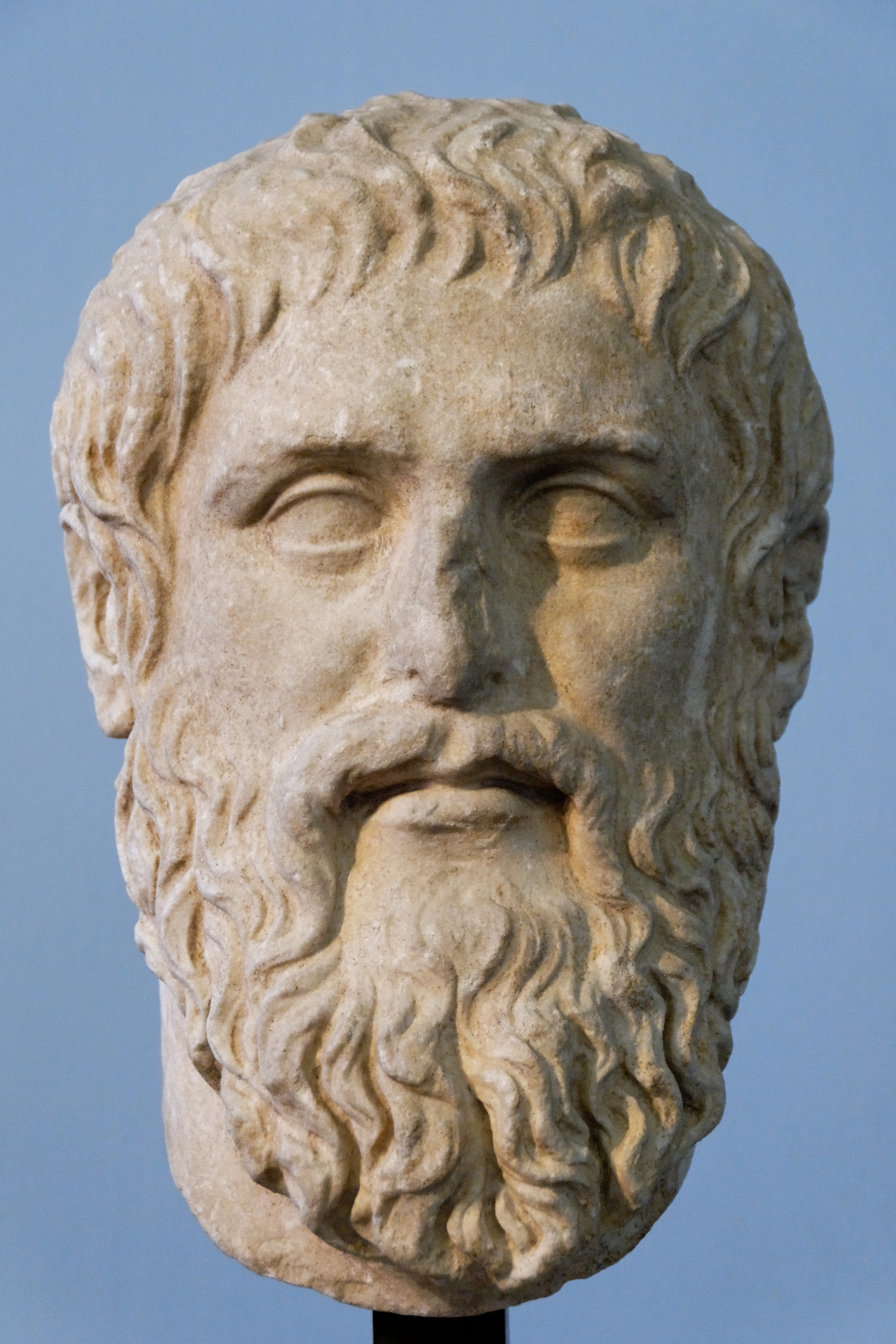
Plato Silanion Musei Capitolini MC1377

Plato (428/427 or 424/423 – 348/347 BC), "deciding for Parmenides against Heraclitus" and his theory of eternal change, had a strong influence on the development of apophatic thought.

Plato further explored Parmenides's idea of timeless truth in his dialogue Parmenides, which is a treatment of the eternal forms, Truth, Beauty and Goodness, which are the real aims for knowledge. The Theory of Forms is Plato's answer to the problem of how one fundamental reality or unchanging essence can admit of many changing phenomena, other than by dismissing them as being mere illusion.

In The Republic, Plato argues that the "real objects of knowledge are not the changing objects of the senses, but the immutable Forms", (Note: Encyclopedia of Plato, Plato Archived 2017-04-12 at the Wayback Machine) stating that the Form of the Good (Note: Identified by various commentators with the Form of Unity.) is the highest object of knowledge. (Note: See The Republic 508d–e, 511b, 516b.) His argument culminates in the Allegory of the Cave, in which he argues that humans are like prisoners in a cave, who can only see shadows of the Real, the Form of the Good. Humans are to be educated to search for knowledge, by turning away from their bodily desires toward higher contemplation, culminating in an intellectual (Note: As opposed to mere rationality.) understanding or apprehension of the Forms, c.q. the "first principles of all knowledge".

According to Cook, the Theory of Forms has a theological flavour, and had a strong influence on the ideas of his Neo-Platonist interpreters Proclus and Plotinus. The pursuit of Truth, Beauty and Goodness became a central element in the apophatic tradition, but nevertheless, according to Carabine "Plato himself cannot be regarded as the founder of the negative way." Carabine warns not to read later Neo-Platonic and Christian understandings into Plato, and notes that Plato did not identify his Forms with "one transcendent source", an identification which his later interpreters made.

=== Middle Platonism ===
Middle Platonism (1st century BC – 3rd century AD) further investigated Plato's "Unwritten Doctrines", which drew on Pythagoras' first principles of the Monad and the Dyad (matter). Middle Platonism proposed a hierarchy of being, with God as its first principle at its top, identifying it with Plato's Form of the Good. An influential proponent of Middle Platonism was Philo (c. 25 BC – c. 50 AD), who employed Middle Platonic philosophy in his interpretation of the Hebrew scriptures, and asserted a strong influence on early Christianity. According to Craig D. Allert, "Philo made a monumental contribution to the creation of a vocabulary for use in negative statements about God." For Philo, God is undescribable, and he uses terms which emphasize God's transcendence.

=== Neo-Platonism ===
Neo-Platonism was a mystical or contemplative form of Platonism, which "developed outside the mainstream of Academic Platonism". It started with the writings of Plotinus (204/5–270 AD), and ended with the closing of the Platonic Academy by Emperor Justinian I in 529 AD, when the pagan traditions were ousted. It is a product of Hellenistic syncretism, which developed due to the crossover between Greek thought and the Jewish scriptures, and also gave birth to Gnosticism. Proclus of Athens (412–485 AD) played a crucial role in the transmission of Platonic philosophy from antiquity to the Middle Ages, serving as head or 'successor' (diadochos, namely of Plato) of the Platonic 'Academy' for over 50 years. His student Pseudo-Dionysius had a far-stretching Neo-Platonic influence on Christianity and Christian mysticism.

==== Plotinus ====
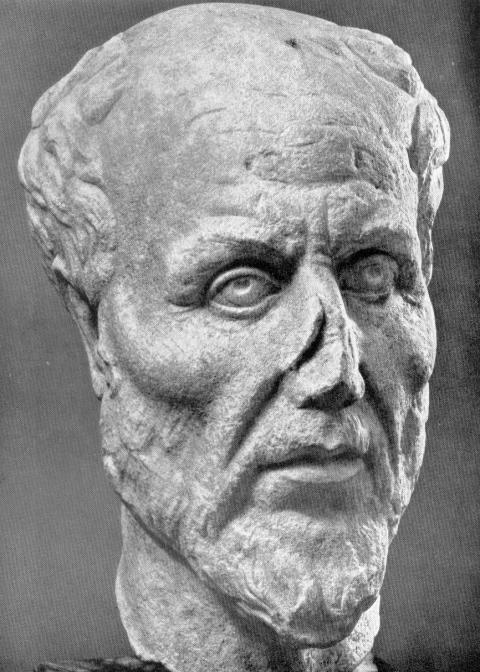
Plotinus, 204/5–270 AD

Plotinus (204/5–270 AD) was the founder of Neo-Platonism. In the Neo-Platonic philosophy of Plotinus and Proclus, the first principle became even more elevated as a radical unity, which was presented as an unknowable Absolute. For Plotinus, the One is the first principle, from which everything else emanates. He took it from Plato's writings, identifying the Good of the Republic as the cause of the other Forms, with the One of the first hypothesis of the second part of the Parmenides. For Plotinus, the One precedes the Forms, and "is beyond Mind and indeed beyond Being". From the One comes the Intellect, which contains all the Forms. The One is the principle of Being, while the Forms are the principle of the essence of beings, and the intelligibility which can recognize them as such. Plotinus's third principle is Soul, the desire for objects external to itself. The highest satisfaction of desire is the contemplation of the One, which unites all existents "as a single, all-pervasive reality".

The One is radically simple, and does not even have self-knowledge, since self-knowledge would imply multiplicity. Nevertheless, Plotinus does urge for a search for the Absolute, turning inward and becoming aware of the "presence of the intellect in the human soul", (Note: Compare Korean Chon (Zen) master Jinuls "tracing back the radiance": Question: What is the mind of void and calm, numinous awareness? Chinul: What has just asked me this question is precisely your mind of void and calm, numinous awareness. Why not trace back its radiance rather than search for it outside? For your benefit I will now point straight to your original mind so that you can awaken to it. Clear your minds and listen to my words." (Note: zenmind.org, Tracing Back the Radiance) See also Buswell, Robert E. (1991). Tracing Back the Radiance: Chinul's Korean Way of Zen. University of Hawaii Press.) initiating an ascent of the soul by abstraction or "taking away", culminating in a sudden appearance of the One. In the Enneads Plotinus writes:

Our thought cannot grasp the One as long as any other image remains active in the soul ... To this end, you must set free your soul from all outward things and turn wholly within yourself, with no more leaning to what lies outside, and lay your mind bare of ideal forms, as before of the objects of sense, and forget even yourself, and so come within sight of that One.

Carabine notes that Plotinus' apophasis is not just a mental exercise, an acknowledgement of the unknowability of the One, but a means to ecstasis and an ascent to "the unapproachable light that is God." (Note: Centre for sacred Sciences, Living Without a Why. An Interview with Deirdre Carabine. Holos: Forum for a New Worldview, Vol. 5, No. 1 (2009)) Pao-Shen Ho, investigating what are Plotinus' methods for reaching henosis, (Note: The Neoplatonic concept of henosis has precedents in the Greek mystery religions as well as parallels in Eastern philosophy.) concludes that "Plotinus' mystical teaching is made up of two practices only, namely philosophy and negative theology." According to Moore, Plotinus appeals to the "non-discursive, intuitive faculty of the soul", by "calling for a sort of prayer, an invocation of the deity, that will permit the soul to lift itself up to the unmediated, direct, and intimate contemplation of that which exceeds it (V.1.6)." Pao-Shen Ho further notes that "for Plotinus, mystical experience is irreducible to philosophical arguments." The argumentation about henosis is preceded by the actual experience of it, and can only be understood when henosis has been attained. Ho further notes that Plotinus's writings have a didactic flavour, aiming to "bring his own soul and the souls of others by way of Intellect to union with the One". As such, the Enneads as a spiritual or ascetic teaching device, akin to The Cloud of Unknowing, demonstrating the methods of philosophical and apophatic inquiry. Ultimately, this leads to silence and the abandonment of all intellectual inquiry, leaving contemplation and unity.

==== Proclus ====
Proclus (412–485) introduced the terminology used in apophatic and cataphatic theology. He did this in the second book of his Platonic Theology, arguing that Plato states that the One can be revealed "through analogy", and that "through negations [dia ton apophaseon] its transcendence over everything can be shown". For Proclus, apophatic and cataphatic theology form a contemplatory pair, with the apophatic approach corresponding to the manifestation of the world from the One, and cataphatic theology corresponding to the return to the One. The analogies are affirmations which direct us toward the One, while the negations underlie the confirmations, being closer to the One. According to Luz, Proclus also attracted students from other faiths, including the Samaritan Marinus. Luz notes that "Marinus' Samaritan origins with its Abrahamic notion of a single ineffable Name of God (יהוה) should also have been in many ways compatible with the school's ineffable and apophatic divine principle."

== Christianity ==
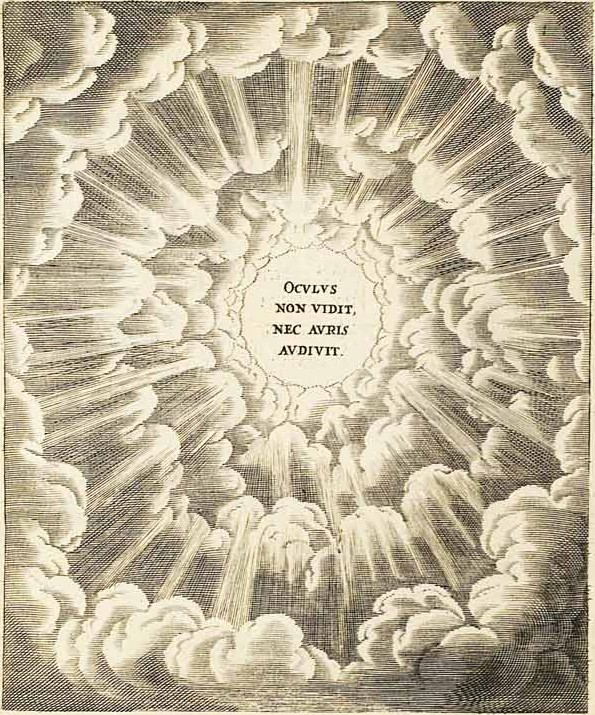
Engraving of Otto van Veen (1660), who negatively describes God as Quod oculus non vidit, nec auris audivit (Vulgate), "What no eye has seen, nor ear heard" (1 Corinthians 2:9)

=== Apostolic Age ===
The Book of Revelation 8:1 mentions "the silence of the perpetual choir in heaven". According to Dan Merkur:

The silence of the perpetual choir in heaven had mystical connotations, because silence attends the disappearance of plurality during experiences of mystical oneness. The term "silence" also alludes to the "still small voice" (1 Kings 19:12) whose revelation to Elijah on Mount Horeb rejected visionary imagery by affirming a negative theology. (Note: According to Michel Masson, Elijah's theophany is an "apophatic revelation", a mystical experience which is akin to nirvana and Böhme's Ungrund. Masson, Michel (2001). "Rois et prophètes dans le cycle d'Élie". Prophètes et rois. Bible et Proche-Orient. By Lemaire, André. Paris: Éditions du Cerf. pp. 119–131. ISBN 978-2-204-06622-8.. Quoted by Lasine, Stuart (2012). Weighing Hearts. Character, Judgment, and the Ethics of Reading the Bible. London: Bloomsbury. p. 121. ISBN 978-0-567-42674-1.)

=== Early Church Fathers ===
The Early Church Fathers were influenced by Philo (c. 25 BC – c. 50 AD), who saw Moses as "the model of human virtue and Sinai as the archetype of man's ascent into the 'luminous darkness' of God". His interpretation of Moses was followed by Clement of Alexandria, Origen, the Cappadocian Fathers, Pseudo-Dionysius, and Maximus the Confessor.

God's appearance to Moses in the burning bush was often elaborated on by the Early Church Fathers, especially Gregory of Nyssa (c. 335 – c. 395), realizing the fundamental unknowability of God; an exegesis which continued in the medieval mystical tradition. Their response is that, although God is unknowable, Jesus as person can be followed, since "following Christ is the human way of seeing God".

Clement of Alexandria (c. 150 – c. 215) was an early proponent of apophatic theology. Clement holds that God is unknowable, although God's unknowability, concerns only his essence, not his energies, or powers. According to R. A. Baker, in Clement's writings the term theoria develops further from a mere intellectual "seeing" toward a spiritual form of contemplation. Clement's apophatic theology or philosophy is closely related to this kind of theoria and the "mystic vision of the soul". For Clement, God is transcendent and immanent. According to Baker, Clement's apophaticism is mainly driven not by Biblical texts, but by the Platonic tradition. His conception of an ineffable God is a synthesis of Plato and Philo, as seen from a Biblical perspective. According to Osborne, it is a synthesis in a Biblical framework; according to Baker, while the Platonic tradition accounts for the negative approach, the Biblical tradition accounts for the positive approach. Theoria and abstraction is the means to conceive of this ineffable God; it is preceded by dispassion.

According to Tertullian (c. 155 – c. 240):

[T]hat which is infinite is known only to itself. This it is which gives some notion of God, while yet beyond all our conceptions – our very incapacity of fully grasping Him affords us the idea of what He really is. He is presented to our minds in His transcendent greatness, as at once known and unknown.

Saint Cyril of Jerusalem (c. 313 – 386), in his Catechetical Homilies, states:

For we explain not what God is but candidly confess that we have not exact knowledge concerning Him. For in what concerns God to confess our ignorance is the best knowledge.

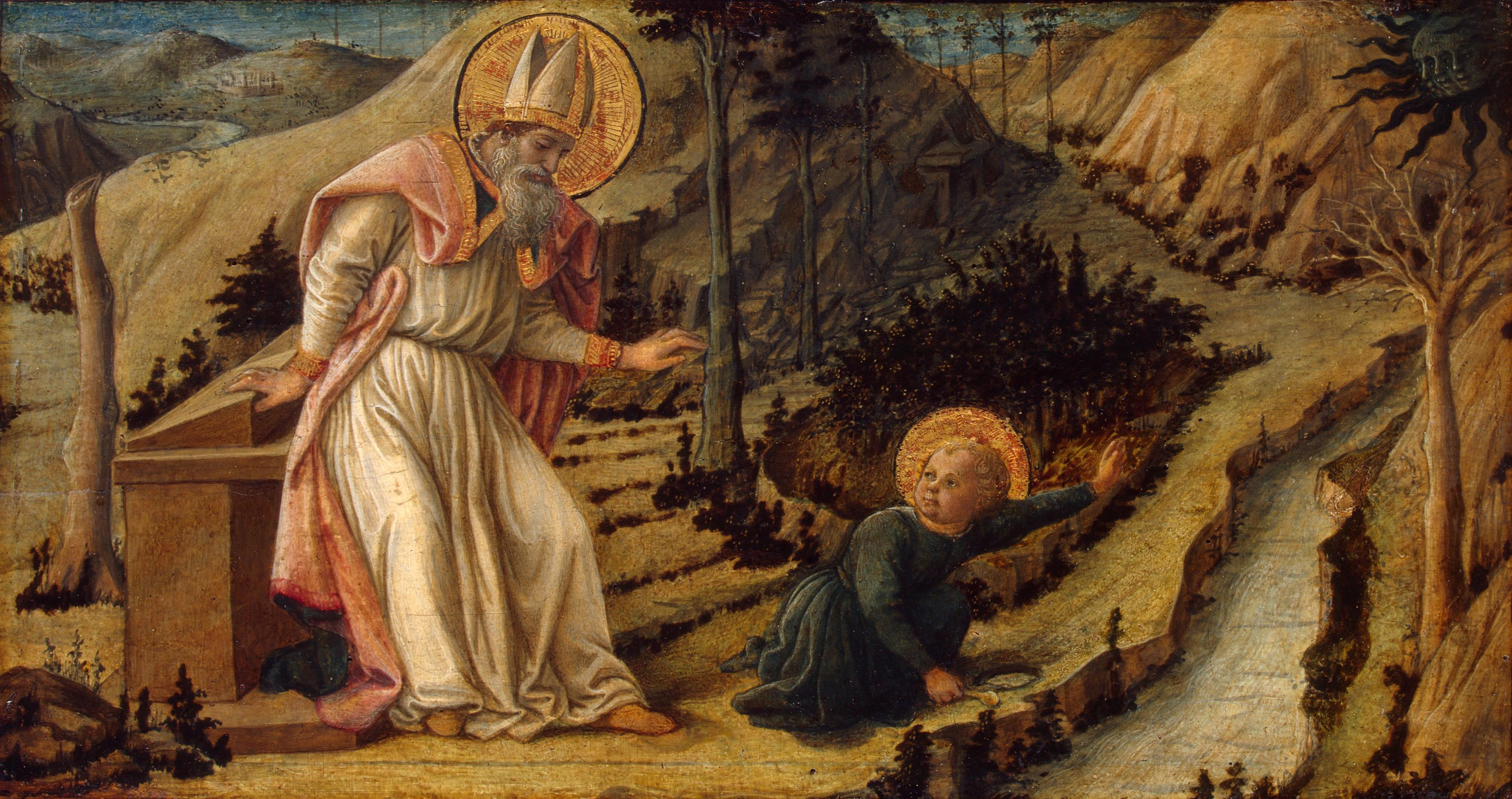
Filippo Lippi, Vision of St. Augustine, c. 1465, tempera, Hermitage Museum, Saint Petersburg

Augustine of Hippo (354–430) defined God aliud, aliud valde, meaning 'other, completely other', in Confessions 7.10.16, wrote Si [enim] comprehendis, non est Deus, meaning "if you understand [something], it is not God", in Sermo 117.3.5 (PL 38, 663), and a famous legend tells that, while walking along the Mediterranean shoreline meditating on the mystery of the Trinity, he met a child who with a seashell (or a little pail) was trying to pour the whole sea into a small hole dug in the sand. Augustine told him that it was impossible to enclose the immensity of the sea in such a small opening, and the child replied that it was equally impossible to try to understand the infinity of God within the limited confines of the human mind.

=== The Chalcedonian Christological dogma ===
The Christological dogma formulated by the Fourth Ecumenical Council held in Chalcedon in 451 is based on dyophysitism and hypostatic union, concepts used to describe the union of humanity and divinity in a single hypostasis, or individual existence, that of Jesus Christ. This remains transcendent to mankind's rational categories, a mystery which has to be guarded by apophatic language, as it is a personal union of a singularly unique kind.

=== Pseudo-Dionysius the Areopagite ===
Apophatic theology found its most influential expression in the works of Pseudo-Dionysius the Areopagite (late 5th to early 6th century), a student of Proclus (412–485) who combined a Christian worldview with Neo-Platonic ideas. He is a constant factor in the contemplative tradition of the eastern Orthodox Churches, and from the 9th century onwards his writings also had a strong impact on western mysticism.

Dionysius the Areopagite was a pseudonym, taken from Acts of the Apostles chapter 17, in which Paul gives a missionary speech to the court of the Areopagus in Athens. In Acts 17:23 Paul makes a reference to an altar inscription, dedicated to the Unknown God, "a safety measure honoring foreign gods still unknown to the Hellenistic world". For Paul, Jesus Christ is this unknown God, and as a result of Paul's speech Dionysius the Areopagite converts to Christianity. Yet, according to Stang, for Pseudo-Dionysius the Areopagite Athens is also the place of Neo-Platonic wisdom, and the term "unknown God" is a reversal of Paul's preaching toward an integration of Christianity with Neo-Platonism, and the union with the "unknown God".

Pseudo-Dionysius further explored apophasis within the context of Christian philosophy, to him, that which is the transcendent cause in a stricter sense, does not possess all the positive attributes of the universe as it succeeds them all, wherein there ought to be no contradiction between affirmation and denial of such inasmuch as it precedes and surpasses all deprivation, being wholly beyond all positive and negative distinctions. In this sense, the One, that we may arise by unknowing is the realization that none can fully know the Infinite One, and therefore is only to be approached by agnosia or by that which is beyond and above all knowledge.

According to Corrigan and Harrington, "Dionysius' central concern is how a triune God ... who is utterly unknowable, unrestricted being, beyond individual substances, beyond even goodness, can become manifest to, in, and through the whole of creation in order to bring back all things to the hidden darkness of their source." Drawing on Neo-Platonism, Pseudo-Dionysius described human ascent to divinity as a process of purgation, illumination and union. Another Neo-Platonic influence was his description of the cosmos as a series of hierarchies, which overcome the distance between God and humans.

=== Eastern Orthodox Christianity ===
In Orthodox Christianity, apophatic theology is taught as superior to cataphatic theology. The fourth-century Cappadocian Fathers (Note: Basil the Great (330–379), who was bishop of Caesarea; Basil's younger brother Gregory of Nyssa (c. 332–395), who was bishop of Nyssa; and a close friend, Gregory of Nazianzus (329–389), who became Patriarch of Constantinople.) stated a belief in the existence of God, but an existence unlike that of everything else: everything else that exists was created, but the Creator transcends this existence, is uncreated. The essence of God is completely unknowable; mankind can acquire an incomplete knowledge of God in his attributes (propria), positive and negative, by reflecting upon and participating in his self-revelatory operations (energeiai). Gregory of Nyssa (c. 335 – c. 395), John Chrysostom (c. 347 – 407), and Basil the Great (329–379) emphasized the importance of negative theology to an orthodox understanding of God. John of Damascus (c. 675/676 – c. 749) employed negative theology when he wrote that positive statements about God reveal "not the nature, but the things around the nature".

Maximus the Confessor (580–622) took over Pseudo-Dionysius' ideas, and had a strong influence on the theology and contemplative practices of the Eastern Orthodox Churches. Gregory Palamas (1296–1359) formulated the definite theology of Hesychasm, the Eastern Orthodox practices of contemplative prayer and theosis, "deification".

Influential 20th-century Orthodox theologians include the Neo-Palamist writers Vladimir Lossky, John Meyendorff, John S. Romanides, and Georges Florovsky. Lossky argues, based on his reading of Dionysius and Maximus Confessor, that positive theology is always inferior to negative theology, which is a step along the way to the superior knowledge attained by negation. This is expressed in the idea that mysticism is the expression of dogmatic theology par excellence.

According to Lossky, outside of directly revealed knowledge through Scripture and Sacred Tradition, such as the Trinitarian nature of God, God in his essence is beyond the limits of what human beings (or even angels) can understand. He is transcendent in essence (ousia). Further knowledge must be sought in a direct experience of God or his indestructible energies through theoria (vision of God). According to Aristotle Papanikolaou, in Eastern Christianity, God is immanent in his hypostasis or existences.

=== Western Christianity ===
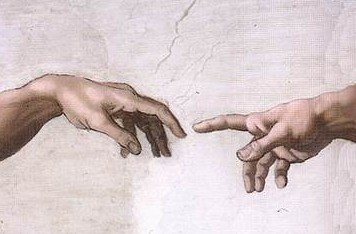
In The Creation of Adam painted by Michelangelo c. 1512, the two index fingers are separated by a small gap (3/4 inch (1.9 cm)): some scholars think that it represents the unattainability of divine perfection by man.

Negative theology has a place in the Western Christian tradition as well. The 9th-century theologian John Scotus Erigena wrote:

We do not know what God is. God Himself does not know what He is because He is not anything [i.e., "not any created thing"]. Literally God is not, because He transcends being.

When he says "He is not anything" and "God is not", Scotus does not mean that there is no God, but that God cannot be said to exist in the way that creation exists, i.e. that God is uncreated. He is using apophatic language to emphasise that God is "other".

Theologians like Meister Eckhart and John of the Cross exemplify some aspects of or tendencies towards the apophatic tradition in the West. The medieval work The Cloud of Unknowing and John of the Cross' Dark Night of the Soul are particularly well known. In 1215 apophatism became the official position of the Catholic Church, which, on the basis of Scripture and church tradition, during the Fourth Lateran Council formulated the following dogma:

Between Creator and creature no similitude can be expressed without implying an even greater dissimilitude.

==== The via eminentiae ====
Thomas Aquinas was born ten years later (1225–1274). In his Summa Theologiae he quotes Pseudo-Dionysius 1,760 times, stating that "Now, because we cannot know what God is, but rather what He is not, we have no means for considering how God is, but rather how He is not". He left the work unfinished because it was "like straw" compared to what had been revealed to him. Nonetheless, his reading in a neo-Aristotelian key of the conciliar declaration overthrew its meaning inaugurating the "analogical way" as tertium between via negativa and via positiva: the via eminentiae. In this way, the believers see what attributes are common between them and God, as well as the unique, not human, properly divine and not understandable way in respect of which God possesses that attributes.

According to Adrian Langdon:

The distinction between univocal, equivocal, and analogous language and relations corresponds to the distinction between the via positiva, via negativa, and via eminentiae. In Thomas Aquinas, for example, the via positiva undergirds the discussion of univocity, the via negativa the equivocal, and the via eminentiae the final defense of analogy.

According to the Catholic Encyclopedia, the Doctor Angelicus and the scholastics declare that:

God is not absolutely unknowable, and yet it is true that we cannot define Him adequately. But we can conceive and name Him in an "analogical way". The perfections manifested by creatures are in God, not merely nominally (equivoce) but really and positively, since He is their source. Yet, they are not in Him as they are in the creature, with a mere difference of degree, nor even with a mere specific or generic difference (univoce), for there is no common concept including the finite and the Infinite. They are really in Him in a supereminent manner (eminenter) which is wholly incommensurable with their mode of being in creatures. We can conceive and express these perfections only by an analogy; not by an analogy of proportion, for this analogy rests on a participation in a common concept, and, as already said, there is no element common to the finite and the Infinite; but by an analogy of proportionality.

Since then Thomism has played a decisive role in resizing the negative or apophatic tradition of the magisterium.

=== 20th century ===
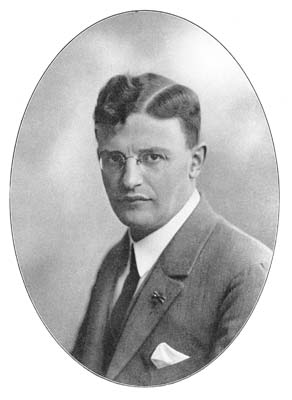
Herman Dooyeweerd

Apophatic statements are still crucial to many modern theologians, restarting in the 1800s by Søren Kierkegaard (see his concept of the infinite qualitative distinction) up to Rudolf Otto, Karl Barth (see their idea of "Wholly Other", i.e. ganz Andere or totaliter aliter), the Ludwig Wittgenstein of the Tractatus, and Martin Heidegger after his Kehre.

C. S. Lewis, in his book Miracles (1947), advocates the use of negative theology when first thinking about God, in order to cleanse one's mind of misconceptions. He goes on to advocate refilling the mind with the truth about God, untainted by mythology, bad analogies or false mind-pictures.

The mid-20th century Dutch philosopher Herman Dooyeweerd, who is often associated with a neo-Calvinistic tradition, provides a philosophical foundation for understanding the impossibility of absolutely knowing God, and yet the possibility of truly knowing something of God. Dooyeweerd made a sharp distinction between theoretical and pre-theoretical attitudes of thought. He argues that most of the discussion of knowledge of God presupposes theoretical knowledge, which involves reflection and attempts to define and discuss. Theoretical knowing, for Dooyeweerd, is never absolute, always depends on religious presuppositions, and cannot grasp either God or the law side. Pre-theoretical knowing, on the other hand, is intimate engagement, exhibits a diverse range of aspects, and can grasp at least the law side. According to Dooyeweerd, knowledge of God, as God wishes to reveal it, is pre-theoretical, immediate and intuitive, never theoretical in nature. The philosopher Leo Strauss considered that the Bible, for example, should be treated as pre-theoretical (everyday) rather than theoretical in what it contains.

Ivan Illich (1926–2002), the historian and social critic, can be read as an apophatic theologian, according to a longtime collaborator, Lee Hoinacki, in a paper presented in memory of Illich, called "Why Philia?".

=== 21st century ===
Karen Armstrong, in her book The Case for God (2009), notices a recovery of apophatic theology in postmodern theology.

Philosopher and literary scholar William Franke, particularly in his 2007 two-volume collection On What Cannot Be Said and his 2014 monograph A Philosophy of the Unsayable, puts forth that negative theology's exploration and performance of language's limitations is not simply one current among many in religious thought, but is "a kind of perennial counter-philosophy to the philosophy of Logos" that persistently challenges central tenets of Western thought throughout its history. For Franke, literature demonstrates the "infinitely open" nature of language which negative theology and related forms of philosophical thought seek to draw attention to. Franke therefore argues that literature, philosophy, and theology begin to bleed into one another as they approach what he frames as the "apophatic" side of Western thought.

== Islam ==
Various traditions and schools in Islam (see Islamic schools and branches) draw on sundry theologies in approaching God in Islam (Allah, Arabic: الله) or the ultimate reality. "Negative theology" involves the use of تَعْطِيل, ta'tīl, defined as 'setting aside', 'canceling out', 'negation', or 'nullification'. The followers of the Mu'tazili school of Kalam, the spread of which is often attributed to Wasil ibn Ata, are often called the Mu'aṭṭilah ('cancelers' or 'negators'), a description, sometimes employed derogatorily, deriving from the school's descriptions of the Islamic God.

Rajab ʿAlī Tabrīzī, an Iranian and Shi'ite philosopher and mystic of the 17th century, is credited with instilling an apophatic theology in a generation of philosophers and theologians whose influence extended into the Qajar period. Mulla Rajab affirmed the completely unknowable, unqualifiable, and attributeless nature of God and upheld a general view concerning God's attributes which can only be negatively 'affirmed' (that is, by affirmingly negating all that is not God about God).

Shia Islam largely adopts "negative theology". (Note: Encyclopædia Iranica: "God Himself comprises two ontological levels: first, of the Essence (ḏāt). This is said to be forever inconceivable, unimaginable, above all thought, beyond all knowledge. It can only be described by God through revelations and can only be apprehended by a negative apophatic theology. This recalls the Deus absconditus, the unknowable that forms the hidden, esoteric level of God, the level of the absolute abscondity of God.") In the words of the Persian Ismaili missionary, Abu Yaqub al-Sijistani: "There does not exist a tanzíh ['transcendence'] more brilliant and more splendid than that by which we establish the absolute transcendence of our Originator through the use of these phrases in which a negative and a negative of a negative apply to the thing denied."

Literalists completely reject and condemn any negation that would clash with the wording of the Islamic Scriptures or with the narratives ascribed to the Islamic Prophet. They therefore hold that descriptors and qualifiers that occur in the Qur'ān and in the canonized religious traditions, even if seeming or sounding humanlike such as "hand", "finger", or "foot", are to be wholly affirmed as attributes of God (not limbs).

Many Sunnites, like the Ash'aris and Maturidis, adhere to some middle path or synthesis between negation and anthropomorphism, though the kind of each combination of negation and affirmation varies greatly.

== Judaism ==
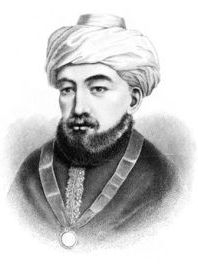
Maimonides, 1138–1204 AD

Apophatic theology is clearly attested in Judaism as early as Josephus. He states that among the Jews, "all profess the same doctrine about God", which is that he is "One, uncreated and immutable to all eternity; in beauty surpassing all mortal thought, made known to us by His power, although the nature of His real being passes knowledge." And also that "By His works and bounties He is plainly seen, indeed more manifest than ought else; but His form and magnitude surpass our powers of description."

Maimonides (1135/1138–1204) was "the most influential medieval Jewish exponent of the via negativa." Maimonides – along with Samuel ibn Tibbon – draws on Bahya ibn Paquda, who shows that our inability to describe God is related to the fact of his absolute unity. God, as the entity which is "truly One" (האחד האמת), must be free of properties and is thus unlike anything else and indescribable. In The Guide for the Perplexed, Maimonides states:

God's existence is absolute and it includes no composition and we comprehend only the fact that He exists, not His essence. Consequently it is a false assumption to hold that He has any positive attribute [...] still less has He accidents (מקרה), which could be described by an attribute. Hence it is clear that He has no positive attribute however, the negative attributes are necessary to direct the mind to the truths which we must believe [...] When we say of this being, that it exists, we mean that its non-existence is impossible; it is living – it is not dead; [...] it is the first – its existence is not due to any cause; it has power, wisdom, and will — it is not feeble or ignorant; He is One – there are not more Gods than one [...] Every attribute predicated of God denotes either the quality of an action, or, when the attribute is intended to convey some idea of the Divine Being itself – and not of His actions — the negation of the opposite.

According to Rabbi Yosef Wineberg, Maimonides stated that "[God] is knowledge," and saw his essence, being, and knowledge as completely one, "a perfect unity and not a composite at all." Wineberg quotes Maimonides as stating:

This [form of unity] wherein G‑d's knowledge and so on is one with G‑d Himself is beyond the capacity of the mouth to express, beyond the capacity of the ear to hear, and beyond the capacity of the heart of man to apprehend clearly.

According to Fagenblat, it is only in the modern period that negative theology really gains importance in Jewish thought. Yeshayahu Leibowitz (1903–1994) was a prominent modern exponent of Jewish negative theology. According to Leibowitz, a person's faith is their commitment to obey God, meaning God's commandments, and this has nothing to do with a person's image of God. This must be so because Leibowitz thought that God cannot be described, that God's understanding is not man's understanding, and thus all the questions asked of God are out of place.

=== Jacques Derrida ===
The work of Jewish philosopher Jacques Derrida, and in particular his critical method called deconstruction, has frequently been compared to negative theology, and led to renewed interest in apophaticism in the late 20th century, even among continental philosophers and literary scholars who may not have otherwise have been particularly invested in theological issues. Conversely, the perception that deconstruction resembled or essentially was a form of secular negative theology also – according to Derrida himself – took the form of an accusation from his critics, implicitly positing both negative theology and deconstruction as being elaborate ways of saying nothing of any substance or importance. However, Derrida strongly repudiated this comparison for much of his career, arguing that any resemblance between his thought and apophaticism is purely superficial. Derrida argued that the aims of negative theology – to demonstrate the ultimate, incomprehensible, transcendent reality of God – are a form of ontotheology which runs fundamentally counter to deconstruction's aim of purging Western thought of its pervasive metaphysics of presence.

Later in his career, such in as his essay "Sauf le nom", Derrida comes to see apophatic theology as potentially but not necessarily a means through which the intractable inadequacies of language and the ontological difficulties which proceed from them can brought to our attention and explored:

There is one apophasis that can in effect respond to, correspond to, correspond with the most insatiable desire of God, according to the history and the event of its manifestation or the secret of its non-manifestation. The other apophasis, the other voice, can remain readily foreign to all desire, in any case to every anthropotheomorphic form of desire.

Scholars such as Stephen Shakespeare have noted that – despite Derrida's pervasive concern with many aspects of Jewish theology and identity – his writing on negative theology draws almost exclusively on Christian writing and couches the topic in the language of Christianity generally. Derrida's thought in general, but in particular his later writing on negative theology, was highly influential in the development of the Weak Theology movement, and of postmodern theology as a whole.

David Wood and Robert Bernasconi have highlighted how Derrida explains what deconstruction is in an overwhelmingly negative, "apophatic" fashion.

== Indian parallels ==
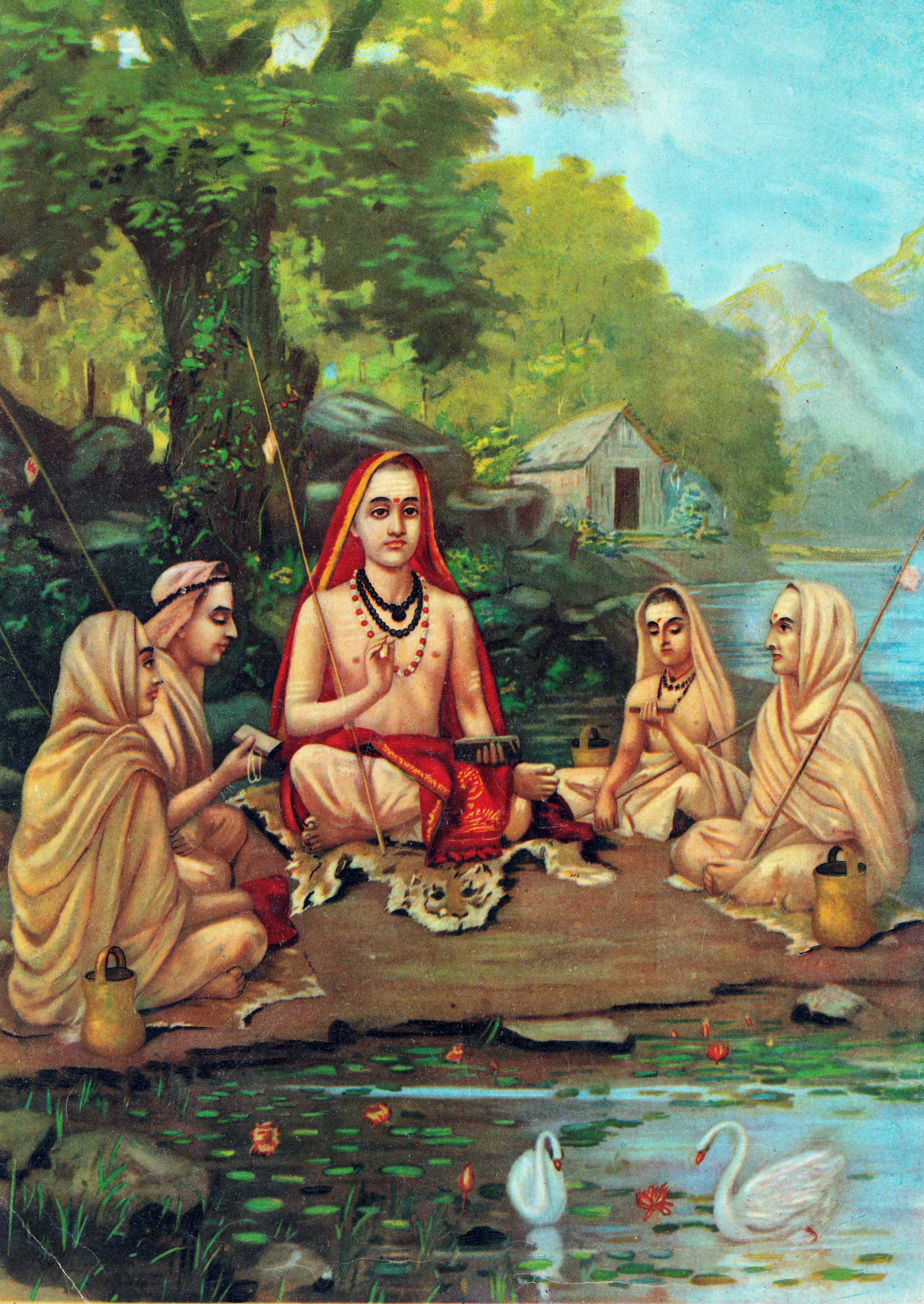
Adi Shankara, 788–820 AD

Early Indian philosophical works which have apophatic themes include the Principal Upanishads (800 BC to the start of the common era) and the Brahma Sutras (from 450 BC and 200 AD). An expression of negative theology is found in the Brihadaranyaka Upanishad, where Brahman is described as "neti neti" or "neither this, nor that". Further use of apophatic theology is found in the Brahma Sutras, which state:

Whenever we deny something unreal, it is in reference to something real.

Buddhist philosophy has also strongly advocated the way of negation, beginning with the Buddha's own theory of anatta (not-atman, not-self) which denies any truly existent and unchanging essence of a person. Madhyamaka is a Buddhist philosophical school founded by Nagarjuna (2nd–3rd century AD), which is based on a four-fold negation of all assertions and concepts and promotes the theory of emptiness (shunyata). Apophatic assertions are also an important feature of Mahayana sutras, especially the prajñaparamita genre. These currents of negative theology are visible in all forms of Buddhism.

Apophatic movements in medieval Hindu philosophy are visible in the works of Shankara (8th century), a philosopher of Advaita Vedanta (non-dualism), and Bhartṛhari (5th century), a grammarian. While Shankara holds that the transcendent noumenon, Brahman, is realized by the means of negation of every phenomenon including language, Bhartṛhari theorizes that language has both phenomenal and noumenal dimensions, the latter of which manifests Brahman.

In Advaita, Brahman is defined as being Nirguna or without qualities. Anything imaginable or conceivable is not deemed to be the ultimate reality. The Taittiriya hymn speaks of Brahman as "one where the mind does not reach". Yet the Hindu scriptures often speak of Brahman's positive aspect. For instance, Brahman is often equated with bliss. These contradictory descriptions of Brahman are used to show that the attributes of Brahman are similar to ones experienced by mortals, but not the same.

Negative theology also figures in the Buddhist and Hindu polemics. The arguments go something like this – Is Brahman an object of experience? If so, how do you convey this experience to others who have not had a similar experience? The only way possible is to relate this unique experience to common experiences while explicitly negating their sameness.

== Bahá'í Faith ==
Bahá'í's believe that God is an ultimately unknowable being (see God in the Baháʼí Faith) and Bahá'í writings state that "there can be no tie of direct intercourse to bind the one true God with His creation, and no resemblance whatever can exist between the transient and the Eternal, the contingent and the Absolute."

According to the Bahá'í Faith, the only way to grow nearer to God is to gain knowledge of the Manifestation of God, who is a reflection of God's reality in a similar way to how a mirror reflects an image of the sun. Stephen Lambden has written a paper entitled, The Background and Centrality of Apophatic Theology in Bábí and Bahá'í Scripture and Ian Kluge has also looked into the Apophatic Theology and the Baha'i faith in the second part of his paper, Neoplatonism and the Bahá'í Writings.

== Apophatic theology and atheism ==
Even though the via negativa essentially rejects theological understanding in and of itself as a path to God, some have sought to make it into an intellectual exercise, by describing God only in terms of what God is not. One problem noted with this approach is that there seems to be no fixed basis on deciding what God is not, unless the Divine is understood as an abstract experience of full aliveness unique to each individual consciousness, and universally, the perfect goodness applicable to the whole field of reality. Apophatic theology is often accused of being a version of atheism or agnosticism, since it cannot truly say that God exists. "The comparison is crude, however, for conventional atheism treats the existence of God as a predicate that can be denied ('God is nonexistent'), whereas negative theology denies that God has predicates". "God or the Divine is" without being able to attribute qualities about "what He is" would be the prerequisite of positive theology in negative theology that distinguishes theism from atheism. "Negative theology is a complement to, not the enemy of, positive theology". Since religious experience—or consciousness of the holy or sacred—is not reducible to other kinds of human experience, an abstract understanding of religious experience cannot be used as evidence or proof that religious discourse or praxis can have no meaning or value. In apophatic theology, the negation of theisms in the via negativa also requires the negation of their correlative atheisms if the dialectical method it employs is to maintain integrity.

== See also ==
Buddhism

- Anatta
- Dharmadhatu
- Dharmakāya
- Sunyata
- Tathātā
- Vipassana

Christianity

- Christian contemplation
- Christian meditation
- Conceptions of God
- Existence of God
- Monastic silence
- Pseudo-Dionysius the Areopagite – Christian apophatic theologian
- Tabor Light

Hinduism

- Neti neti
- Self-enquiry

Islam

- Fana (Sufism)
- Ta'tili

Judaism

- Tzimtzum
- Free will in theology § Judaism

Taoism

- Taoism#Theology

Philosophy

- Nihilism
- Existence of God
- Fideism
- Limit-experience
- Rational fideism

== Sources ==
=== Printed sources ===
- Allert, Craig D. (2002), Revelation, Truth, Canon and Interpretation. Studies in Justin Martyr's Dialogue with Trypho, Leiden: BRILL, ISBN 978-9-004-12619-0
- Angus, Samuel (1975) [1920], The Mystery Religions. A Study in the Religious Background of Early Christianity, Courier Dover Publications, ISBN 0-486-23124-0
- Baker, R. A. (2000), Spiritual Contemplation in Clement of Aleandria's Stromateis
- Belzen, Jacob A.; Geels, Antoon (2003), Mysticism. A Variety of Psychological Perspectives, Rodopi, ISBN 9-04201125-4
- Berthold, George C. (1985), "Introduction" to Maximus the Confessor. Selected Writings, Mahwah, New Jersey: Paulist Press, ISBN 978-0-809-12659-0
- Boersma, Hans (2013), Embodiment and Virtue in Gregory of Nyssa: An Anagogical Approach, Oxford University Press, ISBN 9780191651328
- Boys-Stones, G. R.; Haubold, J. H. (2009), Plato and Hesiod, Oxford University Press
- Bryson, Michael E. (2016), The Atheist Milton, Abingdon-on-Thames: Routledge, ISBN 978-1-317-04095-8
- Carabine, Deirdre (2015), The Unknown God: Negative Theology in the Platonic Tradition: Plato to Eriugena, Eugene, Oregon: Wipf and Stock Publishers
- Cook, Brendan (2013), Pursuing Eudaimonia: Re-appropriating the Greek Philosophical Foundations of the Christian Apophatic Tradition, Cambridge Scholars Publishing
- Corrigan, Kevin; Harrington, L. Michael (2014), Pseudo-Dionysius the Areopagite, Stanford Encyclopedia of Philosophy
- Fagenblat, Michael, ed. (2017), Negative Theology as Jewish Modernity, Indiana University Press, ISBN 978-0-253-02504-3
- Geldard, Richard G. (2000), Remembering Heraclitus, Richard Geldard
- Gerson, Lloyd (2012), Plotinus, Stanford Encyclopedia of Philosophy
- Glasscoe, Door Marion, ed. (1992), The Medieval Mystical Tradition in England. Exeter Symposium V. Papers Read at the Devon Centre, Dartington Hall, July 1992, Woodbridge, Suffolk: Boydell & Brewer, ISBN 978-0-859-91346-1
- Gregorios, Paulos (2002), Neoplatonism and Indian Philosophy, SUNY Press
- Hägg, Henny Fiska (2006), Clement of Alexandria and the Beginnings of Christian Apophaticism, Oxford: Oxford University Press, ISBN 978-0-199-28808-3
- Ho, Pao-Shen (2015), Plotinus' Mystical Teaching of Henosis: An Interpretation in the Light of the Metaphysics of the One, Peter Lang GmbH
- Kahn, Charles H. (1998), Plato and the Socratic Dialogue: The Philosophical Use of a Literary Form, Cambridge University Press
- Lane, Belden C. (2007), The Solace of Fierce Landscapes: Exploring Desert and Mountain Spirituality, Oxford University Press, ISBN 9780199760428
- Langdon, Adrian (2014), God the Eternal Contemporary. Trinity, Eternity, and Time in Karl Barth, Eugene, Oregon: Wipf and Stock Publisher, ISBN 978-1-610-97998-6
- Louth, Andrew (2003), "Holiness and the Vision of God in the Eastern Fathers", in Barton, Stephen C. (ed.), Holiness: Past and Present, A&C Black
- Louth, Andrew (2007), The Origins of the Christian Mystical Tradition: From Plato to Denys, Oxford University Press
- Louth, Andrew (2012), "Apophatic and Cataphatic Theology", in Hollywood, Amy; Beckman, Patricia Z. (eds.), The Cambridge Companion to Christian Mysticism, Cambridge University Press
- Luz, Menahem (2017), "Marinus' Abrahamic notions of the Soul and One (pp. 145ff.)", in Layne, Danielle; Butorac, David D. (eds.), Proclus and his Legacy, Berlin, Germany: Walter de Gruyter GmbH & Co KG, ISBN 978-3-110-47162-5
- MacCulloch, Diarmaid (2010), A History of Christianity, Penguin, ISBN 978-0-141-02189-8
- Mayes, Andrew D. (2016), Learning the Language of the Soul. A Spiritual Lexicon, Collegeville, Minnesota: Liturgical Press, ISBN 978-0-814-64751-6
- McCombs, Richard (2013), The Paradoxical Rationality of Søren Kierkegaard, Bloomington, Indiana: Indiana University Press, ISBN 978-0-253-00647-9
- Meredith, Anthony (2002), "Patristic Spirituality", in Byrne, Peter; Houlden, Leslie (eds.), Companion Encyclopedia of Theology, Routledge, ISBN 9781134922017
- Merkur, Dan (2014), "From Seer to Saint: Psychotherapeutic Change in the Book of Revelation (pp. 316ff.)", in Ashton, John (ed.), Revealed Wisdom. Studies in Apocalyptic in honour of Christopher Rowland. Ancient Judaism and Early Christianity, Leiden: BRILL, ISBN 978-9-004-27204-0
- Mooney, Hilary Anne-Marie (2009), Theophany: The Appearing of God According to the Writings of Johannes Scottus Eriugena, Mohr Siebeck
- Phillips, D. C. (2008), "Theories of Teaching and Learning", in Curren, Randall (ed.), A Companion to the Philosophy of Education, John Wiley & Sons
- Platt, Verity Jane (2011), Facing the Gods: Epiphany and Representation in Graeco-Roman Art, Literature and Religion, Cambridge University Press
- Przywara, Erich (2014), Analogia Entis. Metaphysics: Original Structure and Universal Rhythm, Transl. by John R. Betz, David Bentley Hart, Grand Rapids, Michigan: Wm. B. Eerdmans Publishing, ISBN 978-0-802-86859-6
- Stang, Charles M. (2011), "Dionysius, Paul and the Significance of the Pseudonym", in Stang, Paul M.; Coakley, Sarah (eds.), Re-thinking Dionysius the Areopagite, John Wiley & Sons
- Buxhoeveden, Daniel; Woloschak, Gayle, eds. (2011). Science and the Eastern Orthodox Church (1st ed.). Farnham: Ashgate. ISBN 9781409481614.
