= Muhammad Asim Butt =

Pakistani Urdu novelist

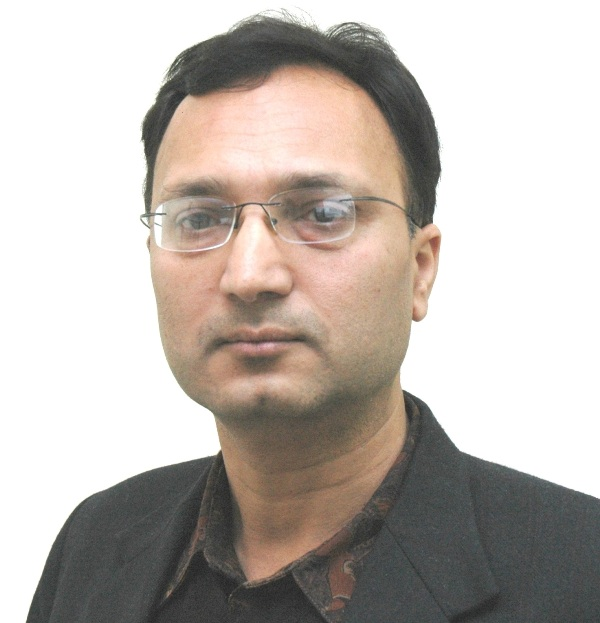
- Education: Government College University, Lahore
- Scientific career
- Fields: Urdu novelist, short story writer, translator, Researcher, editor, critic and journalist
- Workplaces: Pakistan Academy of Letters

Muhammad Asim Butt (Note: Urdu: محمد عاصم بٹ) is an Urdu novelist, short story writer, translator, researcher, editor, critic and journalist. He has published three novels and two collections of short stories along with a number of books translated from English into Urdu and vice versa. Butt also writes in English.

== Biography ==
Butt was born into a muslim literary family of ethnic Kashmiri descent, long settled in Punjab. Since 2006 he has worked with the Pakistan Academy of Letters, Government of Pakistan, as editor of the quarterly Adabiyaat, a literary magazine.

== Publications ==
=== Fiction ===
- Ishtihaar Aadami (Ad man اشتہار آدمی) (short stories), Fiction House, Lahore, Pakistan, 1998
- Daira (Circle دائرہ) (novel), Sanjh Publishers, Lahore, Pakistan, 2001
- Dastak (Knock دستک) (short stories), Dunyazaad, Karachi, Pakistan, 2010
- Naatamaam (An Unending Story ناتمام) (novel), Sang-e-Meel Publications, Lahore, Pakistan, 2014
- Bhaid (Secret بھید) (novel), Sang-e-Meel Publications, Lahore, Pakistan, 2018
- Paani Pe Likhi Kahaani (A story written on water پانی پہ لکھی کہانی) (novel), Sang-e-Meel Publications, Lahore, Pakistan, 2024

=== Translations ===
English to Urdu

- Japani Kahanian ( selected short stories from Japanese Literature), Sareer Publications, Pakistan, 2019
- Borgese Kahanian بورخیس کہانیاں ( selected short stories by Gorge Luis Borgese), Sang e Meel Publications, Lahore, Pakistan, 2017
- So Azeem Aadami سو عظیم آدمی (The 100 by Michael H. Hart), Takhleeqat Publishers, Lahore, Pakistan, 1992
- Muhabbat Key Khatoot محبت کے خطوط (Love Letters by Khalil Gibran), Takhleeqat Publishers, Lahore, Pakistan, 1993
- Kafka Kahanian کافکا کہانیاں (translation of stories by Franz Kafka), Jang Publishers, Lahore, Pakistan, 1994.
- Mukhtasar Tareekh-e-Alam (A Short History of the World by H. G. Wells), Takhleeqat Publishers, Lahore, Pakistan, 1995.
- Marco Polo Ka Safarnama مارکو پولو کا سفر نامہ (Travelogue by Marco Polo), Takhleeqat Publishers, Lahore, Pakistan, 1999.
- Muhammad (Muhammad: A Biography of the Prophet by Karen Armstrong), Takhleeqat Publishers, Lahore, Pakistan, 2002.
- Toahamat ki Dunya توہمات کی دنیا (by Carl Sagan), Mashal, Lahore, Pakistan, 2003.
- Bai Moasam Key Phool (A selection of Japanese stories), Mashal, Lahore, Pakistan, 2003.
- Sarif Nama صارف نامہ (introduction to consumer rights), The Network for Consumer Protection, Islamabad, Pakistan, 2004.
- Fidelio فیڈیلیو (by Ludwig van Beethoven), Friedrich Naumann Stiftung Fur Die Freiheit, Islamabad, Pakistan, 2011.
- Taaleem Ka Liberal Nuqta-e-Nazar تعلیم کا لبرل نقطہ نظر (Liberal Readings on Education (by Stefan Melnik and Sascha Tamm [Eds.]), Friedrich Naumann Stiftung Fur Die Freiheit, Islamabad, Pakistan, 2012.

Urdu to English

- Tale of Four Saints (Retelling of Persian classic tale Qissah Chahaar Darvaish into English) National Book Foundation, Islamabad, 2016 and CreateSpace Independent Publishing Platform; Second edition (4 September 2016).

=== Research and criticism ===
- Doosra Aadami (The Other Person دوسرا آدمی) (interviews), Jang Publishers, Lahore, Pakistan, 1993
- Pakistan Sal Ba Sal (Pakistan Year by Year پاکستان سال بہ سال, National Language Authority, Islamabad, Pakistan, 1999
- Insaani Haqooq aur Urdu Sahaafat انسانی حقوق اور اردو صحافت (Human Rights and Urdu Journalism), The Network for Consumer Protection, Islamabad, Pakistan, 2005
- Abdullah Hussein: Shakhsiat Aur Fun عبداللہ حسین: شخصیت اور فن (Abdullah Hussein: Person & Work), Pakistan Academy of Letters, Islamabad, Pakistan, 2009.
- Kia Jamhooriat Pakistan Kay Liay Zaroori Hai? (Is Democracy Essential for Pakistan?), Liberal Forum Pakistan, Islamabad, Pakistan, 2010.
- Bahtareen Afsaanaon Ka Intikhab (a selection of best Urdu short stories in 2011), Takhleeqat Publishers, Lahore, Pakistan 2011

== Recognition ==
Asim's novel Naatamaam ناتمام won Akse Khushbu (عکس خوشبو) Literary Award for Fiction for 2014.

Asim's novel Natamaam ناتمام has won UBL Literary Excellence Award for 2015.

Asim's book Kafka Kahaanian کافکا کہانیاں won Parveen Shakir Trust Literary Award for best translation for 2024.

Asim's book "Borkhese Kahanian" (بورخیس کہانیاں) (Urdu translation of short stories of Jorge Luis Borges) was short listed for the UBL Literary Excellence Award for 2019.

A selection of best short stories of Urdu Despairing Voices: Selected Urdu Short Stories compiled and translated by Syed Sarwar Hussein, published by Satyam Publishing House, India, 2011 includes two short stories of Butt.

A detailed research thesis based on the critical analysis of three modern Urdu novelists including Butt, by Robina Sultan, published with the title "Teen Nai Novel Nigar" by Dastaaveez Matbuaat, Lahore, Pakistan in 2012.

He participated as a speaker in the Oxford Literary Festival arranged by Oxford, Pakistan and British Council, Pakistan at Islamabad, Pakistan from 30 April to 1 May 2013.
