= The Spiral Staircase: My Climb Out of Darkness =

2005 autobiography by Karen Armstrong

- Book cover
- Author: Karen Armstrong
- Language: English
- Genre: Autobiography, religion
- Publisher: Alfred A. Knopf
- Publication date: 2005
- Publication place: USA
- Pages: 306
- ISBN: 978-0-375-41318-6

The Spiral Staircase: My Climb Out of Darkness (2005) is an autobiography by Karen Armstrong, an English religious scholar and founder of the Charter for Compassion.

== Synopsis ==
The book begins with Armstrong's early life experience as a nun in an authoritarian convent; she talks about the problems she encountered there, and recounts the aftermath of the Second Vatican Council, and finally her leaving the convent. Armstrong then recounts her time at the University of Oxford, which was also going through a period of great institutional change, where, according to one review, she "traded one kind of monasticism for another." As a student in Oxford she earned a BA and MA, but failed to achieve a doctorate; she then got a job teaching in London, but was let go. During that time she dealt with serious health problems and attempted suicide. She was given an opportunity to write a documentary about early Christianity, which set her on a new path of researching religion. Armstrong tells her struggles with faith and religious life, in which she was "knocked back to zero over and over again before she arrived at a personally meaningful concept of the divine" according to one review.

The Spiral Staircase is not Armstrong's first attempt at a memoir, and is in a way a rewrite of her first two books: Through the Narrow Gate and Beginning the World, which she no longer felt gave an accurate portrait of her experience. Beginning the World especially Armstrong felt was "the worst book I have ever written" because it was too soon to write truthfully about the experience of those years.

== Reception ==
Margaret Gunning wrote that the book is "utterly compelling, absorbing and remarkable in its intelligence, wit and flat-out honesty." Lauren Winner wrote in her review in The New York Times:

It is a courageous thing to tell a life story in which you sometimes look unglued, and even more so to rewrite a memoir you've already published. What has changed between Armstrong's first stab at narrating these years, and this new account, is the governing metaphor. She no longer imagines that in leaving the convent she was boldly, cleanly "beginning the world," but rather tracing circles upward on a spiral staircase.
