= A History of God =

1993 non-fiction book by Karen Armstrong

- Author: Karen Armstrong
- Subject: History of religions
- Publisher: Alfred A. Knopf
- Publication date: 1993
- Pages: 460
- ISBN: 0-345-38456-3
- OCLC: 150223350

A History of God is a book by Karen Armstrong that was published by Knopf in 1993. It details the history of the three major monotheistic traditions, Judaism, Christianity and Islam, along with some details on Buddhism and Hinduism. The evolution of the idea of God is traced from its ancient roots in the Middle East up to the present day.

== Summary ==
=== Judaism ===
Armstrong begins with the rise of the cult of Yahweh (Jahweh), one of the deities of Canaan. According to Armstrong, the cult of Yahweh consisted of a variety of ethnic groups that migrated to Canaan in three waves. These groups were united by their loyalty to Yahweh. Yahweh was unique in the ancient Middle East in that he actually participated in the profane lives of his worshipers.

She then examines the sources of the Pentateuch by way of the four authors or groups of authors, known according to the documentary hypothesis as J, E, P and D. Moreover, she explores some of the textual tensions that exist in the Pentateuch as a result of the theological tensions between these authors, or groups of authors. For Armstrong, this tension can be seen in, for example, the contrasting accounts of theophanies. The Jahwist (J) writes of very "intimate" encounters between Abraham and Yahweh, while the Elohist (E) "prefers to distance the event and make the old legends less anthropomorphic."

There follows an examination of the major Israelite prophets, including Isaiah, second Isaiah, Hosea and Ezekiel, and the contribution each made to the Jewish conception of God.

=== Christianity ===
Armstrong then turns to the stories attributed to the life of Jesus. She identifies his roots in the Pharisaic tradition of Hillel the Elder and his effect on the Jewish conception of a god. The death of Jesus and its attendant symbolism are examined, including the various constructions others, most notably Paul, have placed upon these events.

The book explores the rise of trinitarianism, leading to the Nicene Creed, and traces the evolution of the Christian conception of God and the Trinity in the respective Eastern and Western traditions.

Armstrong discusses the rise of modern Christian religiosity, in particular the Protestantism of Martin Luther and John Calvin.

=== Islam ===
The rise of Islam and its appreciation of the nature of God are examined. Armstrong analyzes how modern Shia Islam, with its emphasis upon social action in the service of Allah, the Islamic prophet Muhammad, and the Shia Imams, was a key factor that brought about the Iranian Revolution of 1979.

Subsequent chapters examine respectively both philosophical approaches to the idea of God, and the mystical relationship with God.

=== Conclusion ===
The final chapters examine the notion of the Death of God and the idea of God in a post-modern world.
