= Buddha (book) =

- Author: Karen Armstrong
- Language: English
- Genre: History, nonfiction, religion
- Published: 2004
- Publisher: Penguin
- Publication place: USA
- Pages: 240
- ISBN: 9780143034360

Buddha is a 2004 historical nonfiction book by Karen Armstrong. It is an examination of the life, times, and lasting influence of Siddhartha Gautama, with core tenets of Buddhism introduced throughout history.
