= Muhammad: A Prophet for Our Time =

Book by Karen Armstrong

Muhammad: A Prophet For Our Time
- Author: Karen Armstrong
- Series: Eminent Lives
- Publisher: HarperCollins
- Publication date: 2006
- Preceded by: Muhammad: A Biography of the Prophet

Muhammad: A Prophet For Our Time is a 2006 non-fiction book by the British writer Karen Armstrong. It is part of the "Eminent Lives" series, which are short biographies of famous people by well-known writers. It is Armstrong's second biography of Muhammad. Her first biography Muhammad: a Biography of the Prophet won the Muslim Public Affairs Council Media Award. Muhammad: A Prophet For Our Time is a short biography that shows how most Muslims understand Muhammad and their faith. In the book, Armstrong depicts Muhammad as both a mystic and a wise political and social reformer.
