= Creator ineffabilis =

Catholic prayer

"Creator ineffabilis" (Latin for "O Creator Ineffable") is a Christian prayer composed by the 13th-century Doctor of the Church Thomas Aquinas. It is also called the "Prayer of the St. Thomas Aquinas Before Study" (Latin: Orátio S. Thomæ Aquinátis ante stúdium) because St. Thomas "would often recite this prayer before he began his studies, writing, or preaching." Pope Pius XI published this prayer in his 1923 encyclical letter on St. Thomas Aquinas, Studiórum Ducem. It is now among the most well-known prayers attributed to Saint Thomas Aquinas.

== Text of the prayer ==
Latin original	English translation
Creátor ineffábilis, qui de thesáuris sapiéntiæ tuæ tres Angelórum hierarchías designásti et eas super cœlum empýreum miro órdine collocásti, atque univérsi partes elegantíssime distribuísti: Tu, inquam, qui verus fons lúminis et sapiéntiæ díceris ac superéminens princípium, infúndere dignéris super intelléctus mei ténebras tuæ rádium claritátis, dúplices, in quibus natus sum, a me rémovens ténebras, peccátum scílicet et ignorántiam. Tu, qui linguas infántium facis disértas, linguam meam erúdias atque in lábiis meis grátiam tuæ benedictiónis infúndas. Da mihi intelligéndi acúmen, retinéndi capacitátem, addiscéndi modum et facilitátem, interpretándi subtilitátem, loquéndi grátiam copiósam. Ingréssum ínstruas, progréssum dírigas, egréssum cómpleas. Tu, qui es verus Deus et Homo, qui vivis et regnas in sǽcula sæculórum. Amen	Ineffable Creator, Who, of the treasures of Thy wisdom hast formed the nine choirs of Angels, and set them on high above the heavens in a wonderful order, and hast exquisitely fashioned and knit together all parts of the universe; do Thou, Who art the true fountain and one principle of light and wisdom, deign to shed the brightness of Thy light upon the darkness of my understanding, and thus to disperse the twofold darkness of sin and ignorance wherein I was born. O Thou, Who makest eloquent the tongues of babies, instruct my tongue, and pour forth on my lips the grace of thy blessing. Grant me acuteness in understanding what I read, power to retain it, subtlety to discern its true meaning, and clearness and ease in expressing it. Do Thou order my beginnings, direct and further my progress, complete and bless my ending; Thou Who art true God and true Man, Who livest and reignest world without end. Amen.
