= Ineffability =

Inability of an idea or feeling to be expressed with words

Ineffability is the quality of something that surpasses the capacity of language to express it, often being in the form of a taboo or incomprehensible term. This property is commonly associated with philosophy, theology, aspects of existence, and similar concepts that are inherently "too great", complex or abstract to be communicated adequately. Illogical statements, principles, reasons and arguments may be considered intrinsically ineffable along with impossibilities, contradictions and paradoxes.

== Etymology ==
The term come from Latin ineffabilis is composed of the prefix in-, meaning 'not', and adjective effabilis, meaning 'capable of being expressed'.

== Philosophy ==
Terminology describing the nature of experience cannot be conveyed properly in dualistic symbolic language; it is believed that this knowledge is only held by the individual from whom it originates. Profanity and vulgarisms can easily and clearly be stated, but by those who believe they should not be said, they are considered ineffable. Thus, one method of describing something that is ineffable is by using apophasis, i.e. describing what it is not, rather than what it is.

== Rhetorical and literary usage ==
In rhetorical and literary studies, ineffability has also been analyzed as a conventional stylistic and argumentative pattern, often referred to as The topos of ineffability (German: Unsagbarkeitstopos).

== Theology ==
In Roman Catholic theology, the ineffability of God is affirmed by the First Vatican Council's apostolic constitution Dei Filius:

The holy Catholic Apostolic Roman Church believes and confesses that there is one true and living God, Creator and Lord of heaven and earth, almighty, eternal, immense, incomprehensible, infinite in intelligence, in will, and in all perfection, who, as being one, sole, absolutely simple and immutable spiritual substance, is to be declared as really and essentially distinct from the world, of supreme beatitude in and from Himself, and ineffably exalted above all things which exist, or are conceivable, except Himself.

— Dei Filius, Chapter I

God's ineffability deals with His being infinite, invisible and incomprehensible.

This dogmatic definition comes from a longtime tradition: Tertullian, Athenagoras of Athens, and Clement of Alexandria held that ineffability is a property of God. Thomas Aquinas' Prayer before Study, Creator ineffabilis, addresses God as ineffable whilst also seeking to overcome both ignorance and sin.

== See also ==
- Atopy (philosophy)
- Apophatic (or "negative") theology
- Ideasthesia
- Implicit knowledge
- Meaning (linguistics)
- True name
- Tractatus Logico-Philosophicus § Proposition 7: "Whereof one cannot speak, thereof one must be silent" (Wittgenstein)
