= The topos of ineffability =

Rhetorical and philosophical motif concerning the limits of linguistic expression

The topos of ineffability (German: Unsagbarkeitstopos) is a rhetorical and philosophical motif referring to claims about the inadequacy of language to fully express certain experiences, objects, or forms of knowledge. The concept is used as a retrospective analytical category in the study of rhetoric, literature, theology, and philosophy, rather than as a self-designation employed by historical authors.

The motif has been discussed in Western rhetorical and philosophical traditions from antiquity to modern theory, particularly in relation to metaphysical, aesthetic, and religious discourse.

== Definition ==
The term Unsagbarkeitstopos was systematized and popularized by the literary scholar Ernst Robert Curtius in his analysis of classical rhetorical topoi. In this context, it denotes a conventional argumentative or stylistic pattern in which an author emphasizes that a subject exceeds the expressive capacities of language due to its magnitude, complexity, or transcendence.

In philosophical discourse, the topos of ineffability serves to articulate perceived limits of linguistic representation, particularly in discussions of metaphysical, aesthetic, or religious phenomena.

== Historical background ==
=== Antiquity ===
Reflections on the limits of linguistic expression can already be found in classical Greek philosophy. Plato repeatedly emphasizes the difficulty of adequately expressing ultimate principles, particularly in discussions of the Good and of non-being. Such passages have often been interpreted by later commentators as anticipating themes of ineffability, although Plato himself does not formulate a systematic doctrine of the unsayable.

In Neoplatonism, the limits of discursive language become a central philosophical concern. Plotinus argues that the One, as the highest principle of reality, transcends all predication and conceptual determination. He employs apophatic strategies, paradox, and appeals to silence in order to gesture toward what cannot be expressed verbally.

=== Medieval theology and mysticism ===
In medieval Christian thought, particularly in apophatic theology, the topos of ineffability becomes a prominent argumentative and theological motif. Authors such as Pseudo-Dionysius the Areopagite emphasize divine transcendence through negation and paradox, highlighting the inadequacy of human language in relation to God.

== Rhetoric and literature ==
In rhetoric and literary theory, the topos of ineffability functions as a conventional device used to intensify emotional, aesthetic, or ethical impact. It appears, for example, in passages where authors claim that a subject cannot be described adequately, thereby indirectly enhancing its perceived significance.

The motif became especially prominent in early modern and Baroque literature, where themes of silence, excess, and inexpressibility were employed to signal transcendence or emotional intensity.

During the Romantic period, reflections on the limits of language influenced aesthetic theory, particularly in German Romanticism. In this context, the idea of “absolute music” emerged as an attempt to conceptualize artistic expression that operates beyond the constraints of propositional language.

== Modern philosophy ==
In modern philosophy, ineffability becomes a recurring topic in discussions of language, meaning, and experience.

Immanuel Kant associates the limits of conceptual language with aesthetic ideas, which stimulate thought without being fully determinable by concepts. Such ideas, while not strictly unsayable, exceed the capacity of determinate conceptual articulation.

Ludwig Wittgenstein famously distinguishes between what can be said and what can only be shown, concluding the Tractatus Logico-Philosophicus with the proposition that “whereof one cannot speak, thereof one must be silent.”

== Contemporary discussions ==
In contemporary scholarship, the topos of ineffability is discussed across philosophy, linguistics, literary studies, and discourse analysis, particularly in relation to mystical experience, trauma, and other phenomena that challenge established modes of representation.

== See also ==
- Ineffability
- Apophatic theology
- Philosophy of language
- Rhetoric
