= The Case for God =

2009 book by Karen Armstrong

- Cover
- Author: Karen Armstrong
- Subject: History of religion
- Publisher: Knopf
- Publication date: 2009
- Media type: Print
- Pages: 432
- ISBN: 978-0-307-26918-8

The Case for God is a 2009 book by Karen Armstrong. It covers the history of religion, from the Paleolithic age to the present day, with a focus on the three Abrahamic religions: Judaism, Christianity and Islam, and on apophatic theology in various religions.

Another theme is intellectual beliefs versus practice. Armstrong claims that the fundamental reality, later called God, Brahman, nirvana or Tao, transcends human concepts and thoughts, and can only be known through devoted religious practice.

In 2009, the book was awarded the Dr. Leopold Lucas Prize by the University of Tübingen (Germany) in recognition of its contribution to the fields of theology, philosophy and intellectual history, and for improving international understanding and tolerance among faiths.

== Synopsis ==
In the introduction, Armstrong presents two forms of knowledge, mythos and logos. Since the 16th and 17th century, she says logos governed civilization, resulting in two phenomena: fundamentalism and atheism. Armstrong says that the new atheists have made some invalid criticisms of religion. She states, "I can sympathize with the irritation of the new atheists", but she maintains that they have focused primarily on fundamentalism. She says they "aren't radical enough" and finds their work "disappointingly shallow". According to Armstrong, "My aim in this book is simply to bring something fresh to the table."
