= The Battle for God =

Nonfiction book by Karen Armstrong

- Cover
- Author: Karen Armstrong
- Language: English
- Subject: Religious fundamentalism
- Publisher: Knopf/HarperCollins
- Publication date: 2000
- Publication place: United States
- Media type: Print (Hardcover and Paperback)
- Pages: 480
- ISBN: 978-0006383482

The Battle for God: Fundamentalism in Judaism, Christianity and Islam is a book by author Karen Armstrong published in 2000 by Knopf/HarperCollins which the New York Times described as "one of the most penetrating, readable, and prescient accounts to date of the rise of the fundamentalist movements in Judaism, Christianity, and Islam". The Battle for God traces the history of the rise of fundamentalism in the three major monotheistic faiths. Armstrong's analysis starts with developments in Judaism and traces it through the creation of fundamentalism in Christianity to adoption of a similar approach to modernity in Islam.

== Synopsis ==
Armstrong's central case rests on the confusion between mythos and logos, using these in the technical sense suggested by the philosopher Johannes Sløk. Myth concerns "what was thought to be timeless and constant in our existence... Myth was not concerned with practical matters but with meaning". By contrast "Logos was the rational, pragmatic and scientific thought that enabled men and women to function well in the world". In religion, logos appears in legal systems and practical action. By the eighteenth century, "people in Europe and America began to think that logos was the only means to truth and began to discount mythos as false and superstitious." Armstrong suggests that fundamentalists have turned their mythos into logos using the mindset of the modern scientific age.

The first part of the book, "The Old World and the New", compares the progression of the three monotheistic faiths between 1492, when Columbus landed in America, and 1870, when "The Franco-Prussian War had revealed the hideous effects of modern weaponry, and there was a dawning realisation that science might also have a malignant dimension." It traces the way Jews and Muslims modernized during this period.

This leads to the modern period described in part two, “Fundamentalism”, when there was a growing adoption of a literalist interpretation of scripture in the United States, which eventually gave rise to The Fundamentals, a series of 12 volumes refuting modern ideas published shortly before and during the World War I, of which 3 million copies were distributed to every pastor, professor and theological student across America by the largesse of oil millionaires. Though this led to a distinctive ideology, it was not till the 1980s that it emerged as a political force.

In Judaism, the growth of Zionism was given its biggest boost by the Holocaust which led to the establishment of the State of Israel in 1948. Although many traditional Jews migrated there, the most conservative rejected the secular interpretation of Zionism and it wasn't until the emergence of Gush Emunim after the Yom Kippur War in 1974 that fundamentalism emerged in Israel as a political force.

In Islam, fundamentalism did not emerge until modernization had taken hold, first in Egypt with the creation of the Muslim Brotherhood by Hasan al-Banna. Armstrong traces the development of Sunni fundamentalism under Sayyid Qutb and Shia fundamentalism under Ayatollah Khomeini.

== Response ==
After 9/11, Karen Armstrong became one of the best selling authors in the US, as people attempted to understand the culture of men capable of carrying out such acts. One reviewer points out that "9-11 holds a fresh irony. While Osama and Co. wouldn't exist without the hegemony of Western secularism to rally against, their most effective attack on the Great Satan has breathed new life into our own fundamentalist tendencies." In 2019, The Battle for God was ranked by Slate as one of the 50 best nonfiction books of the past 25 years.
