= Charter for Compassion =

2009 call for world compassion

Charter for Compassion is a document written in 2009 that urges the peoples and religions of the world to embrace the core value of compassion. The charter is available in more than 30 languages and has been endorsed by more than two million individuals.

Charter for Compassion International, the Charter's supporting organization, has enrolled 311 communities in 45 countries in its Compassionate Communities campaign and has partnered with more than 1,300 organizations to spread the Charter's ideas in 10 sectors: the arts, business, education, environment, healthcare, peace, religion/spirituality/interfaith, science & research, social sciences and restorative justice.

== History ==
On February 28, 2008, scholar and author Karen Armstrong won the TED Prize. In her acceptance speech she called for help in creating, launching and propagating a Charter for Compassion, claiming to be based on the fundamental principle of the Golden Rule. An open writing process to create the Charter began in November 2008 with the launch of the Charter for Compassion website. People of all faiths, nationalities and backgrounds submitted ideas on what the Charter should include. Individuals from more than 100 countries added their voices to this process and their submissions were read and commented upon by more than 150,000 visitors to the site.

The Council of Conscience, a multi-faith, multi-national group of religious thinkers and leaders, then met in Vevey, Switzerland, to craft the final Charter for Compassion. The Councillors sorted and reviewed the thousands of written submissions, considered the meaning of compassion, determined key ideas to include in the Charter and created a plan for how the Charter will exist in the world.

The Charter for Compassion was unveiled by Karen Armstrong and the Council of Conscience on November 12, 2009, at the National Press Club in Washington, DC. That day, more than 75 launch events took place around the globe and more than 60 Charter for Compassion plaques designed by Yves Behar were hung at significant religious and secular sites around the world. At its launch, the Charter was endorsed by the 14th Dalai Lama and Archbishop Desmond Tutu among many others.

== The Organization ==
Just a few months after Karen Armstrong was awarded the TED Prize, individuals and organizations around the world began coalescing to bring the Charter for Compassion to life. On May 4, 2009, the 'Compassionate Action Network' (CAN) was launched in Seattle. CAN's intention, expressed in its founding document, was to create "an association of like-minded programs, projects and organizations that collectively represent the power of thousands of relationships."

CAN became the home for the Charter for Compassion from the summer of 2012 through December 2013 and provided startup assistance to the Charter organization, including staff, fundraising, resource development, and strategic planning.

With the support of CAN, the Fetzer Institute and many other groups and individuals, the Charter for Compassion grew steadily in scale and scope. In January, 2014, almost six years after the TED Prize award, a group of leaders in the movement organized as the Global Compassion Council and formed the Charter for Compassion (CFC) as a non-profit(c)(3) organization. The Global Compassion Council became CCI's advisory panel.

=== CFC vision, mission and logo ===
Charter for Compassion's vision is to foster a world where everyone is committed to living by the principle of compassion.

Its mission is to support the emergence of a global movement that brings the Charter for Compassion to life. It does this by being a network of networks—connecting organizers and leaders from around the world; providing educational resources, organizing tools and avenues for communication; sharing lessons, stories and inspiration; and providing an umbrella for Charter for Compassion conferences, events, collaborations, conversations and initiatives to create compassionate communities and institutions around the globe.

The CFC logo incorporates the ancient symbol for infinity. The symbol has long been used to represent the concept of endless love. CFC's use of the symbol in the context of the Charter for Compassion is used to represent the limitless potential of compassion to transform human relationships, institutions and communities.

=== Self-Organizing Structure ===
CFC utilizes self-organization, based on the idea that sustainable change emerges organically from communities. As such, it facilitates connections between resources, individuals and organizations with the intent of promoting compassion. CFC sees networks as the first, critical step in systemic reorganization of the type necessary to make compassion an organizing, luminous force.

The advisory body for CFC is the Global Compassion Council, which consists of leaders in the global compassion movement from the realms of government, business, education, philanthropy, religion and spirituality, healthcare, the environment, peace and social justice. The CFC governing Board of Trustees is drawn from members of the Council. Board members (2016) are: Rev. Dr. Joan Brown Campbell, president; Dr. James Doty, M.D., vice-president; Toni Murden McClure, treasurer; and the following members: Allan Boesak, Amin Hashwani, Imam Mohamed Magid and Amy Novogratz. Karen Armstrong is an ex-officio member of the Board.

CFC activities largely are delegated to made up primarily of volunteers. Located all over the world, the teams function virtually and, where there are several people in one geographic area, in person. There is a weekly teleconference staff meeting where participants review their work and contribute to and make decisions on current CFC initiatives. Also, many of the volunteers are facilitators on CFC's regularly scheduled sector- and theme-based conference calls.

The International Teams help support the daily operational work of the Charter, which includes overseeing and contributing to the Charter's website. Additionally, they support and help grow CCI's partner network and its campaigns to encourage compassionate cities and communities. Team volunteers also work on special Charter initiatives such as the Charter Community Tool Box, the Charter Education Institute and informational materials on the Charter.

== Major Initiatives ==
=== Compassionate Communities ===
At the heart of the Charter for Compassion's work is its Campaign for Compassionate Communities. In the beginning, this effort was focused on building a network of cities, but it soon became evident that communities both larger and smaller than cities wanted to join the movement to embrace compassion as a core value. The Charter's growing network of Compassionate Communities encompasses nearly 50 countries and includes cities, towns, townships, shires, hamlets, villages, neighborhoods, islands, states, provinces, and counties. Of these, more than 76 cities globally have affirmed the Charter for Compassion through city, community councils or other government entities. Affirming the Charter means that a community has identified issues on which they are working, and have committed to a multi-year action plan. A list of participating communities can be found here.

CFC's Compassionate Communities program is not a certificate program that offers a seal of approval, nor does it subscribe to a single definition of a compassionate community. Instead, the Charter invites communities of all sizes to bring compassion to life in practical, specific ways through compassion-driven actions—in neighborhoods, businesses, schools and colleges, healthcare, the arts, local government, peace groups, environmental advocacy groups and faith congregations.

Any individual, group or organization that recognizes the need for greater compassion in a community is encouraged to begin the process for creating a Compassionate Community. While the Charter does not prescribe any one path, it does recommend that the process be designed and carried out by a diverse and inclusive coalition of people so that all voices within the community are heard, and the significant issues are addressed.

The Charter for Compassion has developed a four-part model or framework, called the Charter Community Tool Box, to help communities build a compassionate society. The Tool Box is intended to provide communities with a starting point and a process to follow, though it is adaptable to the unique circumstances of any community that seeks to become a Compassionate Community. There are four broad phases: Discover and Assess; Focus and Commit; Build and Launch; Evaluate and Sustain. For each of the phases the Tool Box includes more specific steps as well as stories and examples. Depending on the community, its particular issues and available resources, this process may take one or more years.

Within the Charter Tool Box are relevant references to the University of Kansas’ Community Tool Box, with which the Charter collaborated on this project. The Charter's model for building Compassionate Communities resides on the University of Kansas’ Community Tool Box website.

The cities and communities that sign on to become Compassionate Cities and Communities often begin their work by identifying issues that are troubling the community and need to be addressed through compassionate action. For example, a community may discover a significant issue related to social justice for women, immigrants or some other marginalized group. Other communities may want to address issues of drug use, gang violence, the lack of equitable healthcare, or the effects of racism. Others may decide to work to empower youth or to educate their communities about the need for compassion in addressing environmental issues.

==== Louisville, KY—Model City ====
Louisville, KY was named the ICC's Model City of the year for four consecutive years (2012–2015). It was the seventh city to sign on to the Compassion Charter, and Mayor Greg Fischer created Compassionate Louisville to help develop and implement a city-wide campaign to nurture and champion the growth of compassion. One of its signature events is the annual 'Mayor's Give a Day Week', in which the entire city makes time for volunteering, service and compassion. In 2015, the city broke its own record, with more than 166,000 volunteers and acts of compassion.

Compassionate Louisville's education team launched the Compassion Bench project, which is designed to provide safe spots in the community where children are encouraged to express compassion. The first was installed at the Louisville Islamic Center on the heels of an act of vandalism there that ultimately served only to unify the community. Mayor Fischer noted that the vandalism at the mosque illustrates the heart of compassion in Louisville. Within hours of the terrible act, dozens of community and religious leaders showed up at an 8 a.m. press conference to denounce the hate and make plans for a community cleanup the next day. That cleanup drew a crowd of nearly 1,000 people—men, women and children; people of all color, nationality, religion and political leanings. “If the vandals’ goal was to highlight division, they failed miserably,” said Mayor Fischer. “This is a city that rejects hate, and the response to the incident at the mosque was a beautiful illustration of the work we’ve done to become a community of even greater compassion.”

Other examples of the city's commitment to compassion in 2015 include:

- The community's Give Local Louisville effort brought in almost $3 million for local charities in one day.
- Members of Compassionate Louisville's Coordinating Circle have mentored more than 40 other communities interested in joining the Compassionate Cities movement, including surrounding counties like Henderson, Ky., as well as large cities like Detroit.
- In April, Mayor Fischer announced that Louisville and Jefferson County Public Schools will serve as the site of an independently funded, $11 million health and wellness project focused on teaching caring for oneself and others.
- Louisville supported and competed in the “Compassion Games: Survival of the Kindest!” in September, joining cities across the nation in vying to post the greatest number of good deeds in an 11-day stretch in September.
- Nearly 100 local organizations and businesses have made a commitment to compassion this year, including the international YUM! Brands and Brown-Forman.
- Metro Louisville has lined up almost 100 volunteer mentors to work one-on-one with at-risk youth in a program called “Right Turn.” And Louisville Metro Government itself launched Metro Mentors, which allows and encourages city employees to spend two hours of paid time each week working with at-risk youth.
- In March, area nonprofits worked with Liberians in our community to fill a huge 12-metre (40 ft) ocean-going container with emergency meals, water purification and medical supplies and equipment for Ebola victims and families and for those suffering the aftermath of the civil war in Liberia.

=== Charter for Compassion Partners ===
Charter for Compassion believes it is possible—and indeed, urgently necessary—to tap into humanity's common desire for a more compassionate and peaceful world by building a vast interconnected network of compassion among the peoples of the Earth. It encourages groups, organizations, and institutions to join the Charter for Compassion's network of networks by signing on as a partner, at no cost, in any one of its current sectors: Arts, Business, Education, Environment, Healthcare, Peace and Non-violence, Religion/Spirituality/Interfaith, Restorative Justice, Science and Research, Social Justice, Social Service, and Women and Girls.

These partners represent a vast range of activities. In the science and research field, for example, Stanford University’s Center for Compassion and Altruism Research and Education is conducting research into mapping compassion in the brain and developing compassion training programs for adults. In the Netherlands, an impassioned group of medical students has written a charter focused on medical ethics and compassion in healthcare. They are working to make compassion training a required part of the medical school curriculum.

In education, partners around the globe have translated the Charter for children and many schools are using compassionate curricula developed for all age levels. Pakistan, one of the most active Charter partners, introduces a compassionate character into the Pakistani Sesame Street, Sim Sim Harama. Pakistan is working closely with Jordan, on the other side of the Gulf, in education efforts. In Jordan one compassionate school is housed in a tent and follows nomads through the Jordanian desert.

Another project trains prison officers to treat inmates with more respect and care. When it was put into practice in a jail in Washington State, the goal was to decrease violence by 2.5 percent; in fact the project was so successful that violence was decreased by 100 percent. Now the creators are evaluating just what the federal government could save by implementing this program across the United States.

=== The Charter for Compassion Education Institute ===
The Charter for Compassion Education Institute was formed in 2016 to educate and prepare people of the world to live a compassionate life, to understand the power of compassion to transform the inequities and injustices of human civilization, and to spread compassion and compassionate action throughout the world.

The Education Institute successfully launched its first online course in September 2016 with students from six countries and has several exciting courses lined up for Spring 2017. These first courses deal with how to develop compassion for others, how to learn self-compassion, and how to become a part of the growing compassion movement and the Charter for Compassion. Eventually, CFC will offer courses that address the work of compassion in many contexts—in communities, healthcare, business, education, religion and interfaith, the arts, restorative justice, environment, and science. Instructors from several countries are in the process of developing online courses.
