= William Franke (philosopher) =

American academic and philosopher

William Franke is a Franco-American philosopher of the humanities, poet, and professor of Comparative Literature at Vanderbilt University (formerly and concomitantly Professor Catedrático and Head of Philosophy and Religions at the University of Macau, 2013-2016). A main exposition of his philosophical thinking is A Philosophy of the Unsayable (2014), a book which dwells on the limits of language in order to open thought to the inconceivable. On this basis, the discourses of myth, mysticism, metaphysics, and the arts take on new and previously unsuspected types of meaning. This book is the object of a Syndicate Forum and of a collective volume of essays by diverse hands in the series “Palgrave Frontiers in Philosophy of Religion”: Contemporary Debates in Negative Theology and Philosophy. Franke's apophatic philosophy is based on his two-volume On What Cannot Be Said: Apophatic Discourses in Philosophy, Religion, Literature, and the Arts (2007), which reconstructs in the margins of philosophy a counter-tradition to the thought and culture of the Logos. Franke extends this philosophy in an intercultural direction, entering the field of comparative philosophy, with Apophatic Paths from Europe to China: Regions Without Borders. In On the Universality of What is Not: The Apophatic Turn in Critical Thinking, Franke argues for application of apophatic thinking in a variety of fields and across disciplines, from humanities to cognitive science, as key to reaching peaceful mutual understanding in a multicultural world riven by racial and gender conflict, religious antagonisms, and national and regional rivalries.

== Biography ==
Franke holds degrees in philosophy and theology from Williams College and Oxford University and in comparative literature from UC Berkeley and Stanford (Ph.D. 1991). He lectures and teaches in English, German, French, Italian, and Spanish on five continents. He is a research fellow of the Alexander von Humboldt-Stiftung and a senior fellow of the International Institute for Hermeneutics (IIH). He has been Fulbright-University of Salzburg Distinguished Chair in Intercultural Theology and the Study of Religions and Francesco de Dombrowski Visiting Professor at Harvard University’s Center for Italian Renaissance Studies in Florence. In 2021, he became Honorary Professor (Professor Honoris Causa) of the Agora Hermeneutica. He is a member of "HolyLit: Religion and Literature," of the Freie Universität Berlin and Harvard University and has been a member of the Dante Society Executive Council by general election of the Dante Society of America. In 2025, together with several of his former PhD students (now professors), he founded The William Franke Center for Apophatic Thought and Culture at the medieval Château de la Frogerie in France: https://chateaufrogerie.fr/

== Work ==
Franke's philosophical work intertwines with his production as a theorist in comparative literature. His interdisciplinary approach centers on Dante’s Divine Comedy read as theological revelation in poetic language. His book, Dante’s Interpretive Journey (1996) constructs an interpretation of the Comedy in dialogue with German hermeneutic theory (Heidegger, Gadamer, Fuchs, Ebeling, Bultmann). The sequel, Dante and the Sense of Transgression: The Trespass of the Sign (2012), complements it by bringing the Comedy into dialogue with contemporary French thought of difference (Bataille, Blanchot, Barthes, Levinas, Derrida). While using the instruments of contemporary literary theory to read Dante's poem, these books also leverage Dante's medieval theological vision in order to level critiques against modern thinking forgetful of its grounds in sources that transcend rational justification and can only be imagined. 2021 saw the publication of three monographs by Franke rewriting the history of philosophy as pivoting around Dante rather than Descartes viewed as origin for emerging modern forms of self-reflection. These books bring the thinking at work in Dante’s poetry to bear on our contemporary philosophical problematics. They were collectively awarded the Hermes Prize by the International Institute for Hermeneutics for Book of the Year in Phenomenological Hermeneutics.

Franke's work of speculative criticism powered by philosophical reflection is shaped into a comprehensive poetics of revelation starting with Poetry and Apocalypse: Theological Disclosures of Poetic Language (2009). This involves a construction of Christian epic tradition extending backward from James Joyce to Dante's essential source texts in antiquity and the Middle Ages with The Revelation of Imagination: From the Bible and Homer through Virgil and Augustine to Dante (2015). Moving in the opposite direction, Secular Scriptures: Modern Theological Poetics in the Wake of Dante (2016) traces the inheritance of Dante's theological vision forward into the modern era of secularized prophetic poetry and poetics. These critical interventions are at the same time theoretical employments of literature to engage certain of the chief intellectual problems of our own time, beginning from the status of knowledge as science and as revelation.

Franke has published well over a hundred essays and articles of philosophical and theological interpretations of literature ranging from the biblical prophets and classical poets to Shakespeare and Milton, Dickinson, Baudelaire, Edmond Jabès, and Paul Celan. These essays deal also with theoretical topics such as dialectical and deconstructive logic, figurative rhetoric, psychoanalysis as a hermeneutics of subjectivity, postsecular critical reason, and cultural theory in the wake of the death of God. Those of a more literary-critical bent include interventions on the canon debate, world literature, postcolonial ethics, and postmodern (non)identities.

== Bibliography ==
- Mallarmé’s Theo-Political Poetics: Revolution and Revelation in French Symbolist Poetry. Cambridge, UK: Cambridge University Press, 2026.Cambridge Elements: History of Philosophy and Theology in the West
- The Sign of the Swan: How French Symbolist Poetry Re-envisions Reality. London: Anthem Press, 2026 (82 + xii pages)
- Social Identities and Social Justice: Reconceiving Ethics and Politics in the Wake of Wokeism. Washington: Academica Press, 2025 (313 pages + 6 B/W illustrations)
- Pandemics and Apocalypse in World Literature: The Hope for Planetary Salvation. New York: Routledge, 2025 (136 Pages 6 B/W Illustrations)
- Don Quixote's Impossible Quest for the Absolute in Literature: Fiction, Reflection, and Negative Theology. New York: Routledge, 2024 (250 + xvi pages)
- Dantologies: Theoretical and Theological Turns in Dante Studies. New York: Routledge, 2023 (264 + xiv pages) Routledge Studies in Medieval Literature and Culture
- Dante’s Vita Nuova and the New Testament: Hermeneutics and the Poetics of Revelation. Cambridge: Cambridge University Press, 2021 (299 + xix pages)
- The Divine Vision of Dante’s Paradiso: The Metaphysics of Representation. Cambridge: Cambridge University Press, 2021 (304 + xx pages)
- Dante’s Paradiso and the Theological Origins of Modern Thought: Toward a Speculative Philosophy of Self-Reflection. New York: Routledge, 2021 (334 + xxii pages) Routledge Interdisciplinary Perspectives on Literature Series
- On the Universality of What is Not: The Apophatic Turn in Critical Thinking. Notre Dame: University of Notre Dame Press, 2020 (450 pages)
- Apophatic Paths from Europe to China: Regions Without Borders. Albany: State University of New York Press, 2018. Series on Chinese Philosophy and Culture, edited by Roger Ames (270 pages)
- A Theology of Literature: The Bible as Revelation in the Tradition of the Humanities. Eugene, Oregon: Wipf and Stock Publishers, 2017. Cascade Companions series, Cascade Books Imprint (104 + ix pages)
- Secular Scriptures: Modern Theological Poetics in the Wake of Dante. Columbus: Ohio State University Press: 2016 (256 + xii pages) Literature, Religion, and Postsecular Studies series, edited by Lori Branch
- The Revelation of Imagination: From the Bible and Homer through Virgil and Augustine to Dante. Evanston: Northwestern University Press, 2015 (424 + xii pages)
- A Philosophy of the Unsayable. Notre Dame: University of Notre Dame Press, 2014 (384 + viii pages)
- Dante and the Sense of Transgression: ‘The Trespass of the Sign.’ London and New York: Continuum [Bloomsbury Academic], 2013. New Directions in Religion and Literature Series, edited by Mark Knight and Emma Mason (200 + xv pages)
- Poetry and Apocalypse: Theological Disclosures of Poetic Language. Stanford: Stanford University Press: 2009 (211 + xiv pages). Translated into German as: Dichtung und Apokalypse: Theologische Erschliessungen der dichterischen Sprache. Aus dem Amerikanischen von Ursula Liebing und Michael Sonntag. Salzburger Theologische Studien Band 39 (Interkulturell 6) Innsbruck: Tyrolia Verlag, 2011 (216 pages)
- On What Cannot Be Said: Apophatic Discourses in Philosophy, Religion, Literature, and the Arts. Notre Dame, Indiana: University of Notre Dame Press, 2007. Edited with Theoretical and Critical Essays by William Franke. Vol. I: Classic Formulations (401 + xi pages); Vol. II: Modern and Contemporary Transformations (480 + viii pages)
- Dante’s Interpretive Journey. Chicago: University of Chicago Press, 1996 (242 + xi pages) Religion and Postmodernism series, edited by Mark C. Taylor
- Transcendence, Immanence, and Intercultural Philosophy. Edited by Nahum Brown and William Franke. New York: Palgrave Macmillan, 2016.

POETRY BOOKS

- The Vagabond Scholar: Poems of My Life and Thought in Several European Lands. Eugene, Oregon: Cascade Books [Wipf & Stock], 2026. 130 pp + 24 B/W illustrations
- The Thoughtful Muse: Autobiography in Occasional Verse. Eugene, Oregon: Cascade Books [Wipf & Stock], 2026. 338 pp + 54 B/W illustrations
