= Muhammad: A Biography of the Prophet =

- Author: Karen Armstrong
- Subject: Muhammad
- Publisher: Victor Gollancz Ltd
- Publication date: 1991
- Publication place: United Kingdom
- Media type: Print
- ISBN: 0575062444 (1995 ed.)
- OCLC: 656709180
- Dewey Decimal: 297/.63 B
- LC Class: BP75 .A76 1992
- Followed by: Muhammad: A Prophet for Our Time

Muhammad: A Biography of the Prophet is a biography of Muhammad by the British religion writer and lecturer Karen Armstrong, published by Gollancz in 1991.

== Overview ==
The book gives a comparison between the three major monotheistic religions of Islam, Christianity and Judaism. It also derives relevant examples from Buddhism and Hinduism. It not only speaks about the life of Muhammad but also discusses the relationships and conflicts between the Western and Islamic worlds. The book also discusses the effect that Western attitudes have had on the Muslim psyche and attempts to explain the diverse attitudes of many modern Muslims towards the Western world today.

After 9/11 Armstrong revisited the subject and wrote Muhammad: A Prophet for Our Time for the Atlas Books "Eminent Lives" series, published by HarperCollins in 2006 (249 pages).

== Editions ==
- First, 1991. Victor Gollancz Ltd
- First U.S. edition, 1992. HarperSanFrancisco (HarperCollins). ISBN 0-06-250014-7 (290 pages)
- Paperback (revised), 1993. HarperCollins. ISBN 0-06-250886-5 (288 pages)

Orion Publishing Group acquired the Gollancz name in its 1998 acquisition of Cassell & Co, which had owned Gollancz since 1992. Orion made Gollancz a fantasy and science fiction imprint.

- Paperback, 2001. Orion Publishing Group ISBN 1-84212-608-3 (288 pages)
  - In Canada, published under the Orion imprint Phoenix Books.
  - In UK, published under the Orion imprint Weidenfeld & Nicolson.
