= Karen Armstrong =

English author (born 1944)

Karen Armstrong OBE FRSL
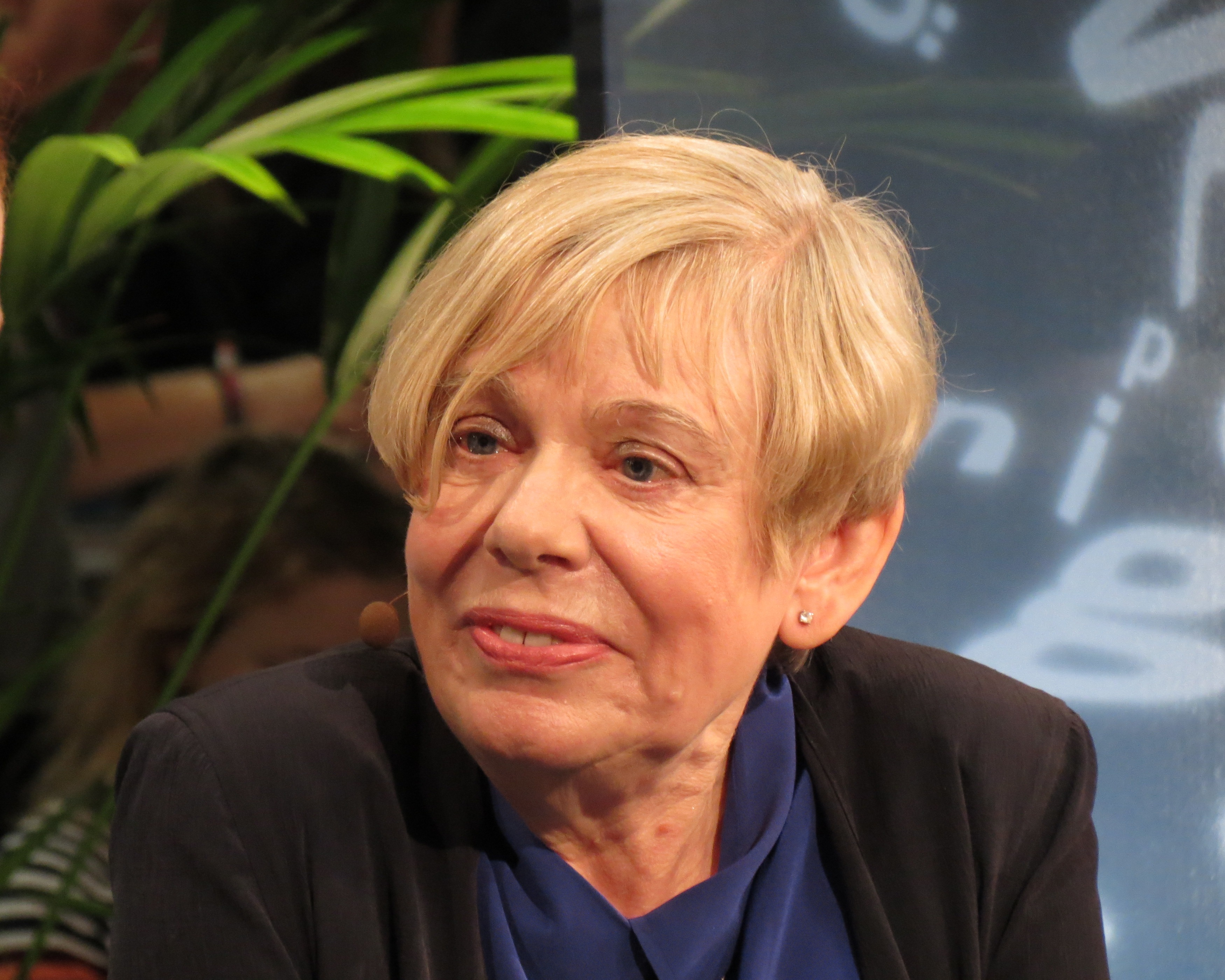
- Armstrong in 2016
- Born: 14 November 1944 (age 82); Wildmoor, Worcestershire, England
- Education: St Anne's College, Oxford
- Occupation: Writer
- Website: CharterForCompassion.org

Karen Armstrong (born 14 November 1944) is a British author and commentator known for her books on comparative religion. A former Catholic religious sister, she went from a conservative to a more liberal and mystical Christian faith. She attended St Anne's College, Oxford, while in the convent and graduated in English. She left the convent in 1969. Her work focuses on commonalities of the major religions, such as the importance of compassion and the Golden Rule.

Armstrong received the US$100,000 TED Prize in February 2008. She used that occasion to call for the creation of a Charter for Compassion, which was unveiled the following year.

== Early life and education ==
Armstrong was born at Wildmoor, Worcestershire, into a family of Irish ancestry who, after her birth, moved to Bromsgrove and later to Birmingham. In 1962, at the age of 17, she became a member of the Sisters of the Holy Child Jesus, a teaching congregation, in which she remained for seven years. Armstrong says she suffered physical and psychological abuse in the convent; according to an article in The Guardian newspaper, "Armstrong was required to mortify her flesh with whips and wear a spiked chain around her arm. When she spoke out of turn, she claims she was forced to sew at a treadle machine with no needle for a fortnight."

Once she had advanced from postulant and novice to professed nun, she enrolled in St Anne's College, Oxford, to study English. Armstrong left her order in 1969 while still a student at Oxford. After graduating with a Congratulatory First, she embarked on a DPhil on the poet Alfred Tennyson. According to Armstrong, she wrote her dissertation on a topic that had been approved by the university committee. Nevertheless, it was failed by her external examiner on the grounds that the topic had been unsuitable. Armstrong did not formally protest this verdict, nor did she embark upon a new topic but instead abandoned hope of an academic career. She reports that this period in her life was marked by ill-health stemming from her lifelong but, at that time, still undiagnosed temporal lobe epilepsy. Around this time she was lodged with Jenifer and Herbert Hart, looking after their disabled son, as told in her memoir The Spiral Staircase.

== Personal life ==
Armstrong is unmarried. Although she had once described herself as a "freelance monotheist," more recently she said, "I wouldn't even call myself a monotheist anymore. ... If anything, I'm a Confucian, I think."

== Career ==
In 1976, Armstrong took a job teaching English at James Allen's Girls' School in Dulwich while working on a memoir of her convent experiences. This was published in 1982 as Through the Narrow Gate to excellent reviews. That year she embarked on a new career as an independent writer and broadcasting presenter. In 1984, the British Channel Four commissioned her to write and present a television documentary on the life of St. Paul, The First Christian, a project that involved traveling to the Holy Land to retrace the steps of the saint. Armstrong described this visit as a "breakthrough experience" that defied her prior assumptions and provided the inspiration for virtually all her subsequent work. In A History of God: The 4,000-Year Quest of Judaism, Christianity and Islam (1993), she traces the evolution of the three major monotheistic traditions from their beginnings in the Middle East up to the present day and also discusses Hinduism and Buddhism. As guiding "luminaries" in her approach, Armstrong acknowledges (in The Spiral Staircase and elsewhere) the late Canadian theologian Wilfred Cantwell Smith, a Protestant minister, and the Jesuit father Bernard Lonergan. In 1996, she published Jerusalem: One City, Three Faiths.

Armstrong's The Great Transformation: The Beginning of Our Religious Traditions (2006) continues the themes covered in A History of God and examines the emergence and codification of the world's great religions during the so-called Axial Age identified by Karl Jaspers. In the year of its publication Armstrong was invited to choose her eight favourite records for BBC Radio's Desert Island Discs programme. She has made several appearances on television, including on Rageh Omaar's programme The Life of Muhammad. Her work has been translated into forty-five languages. She was an advisor for the award-winning, PBS-broadcast documentary Muhammad: Legacy of a Prophet (2002), produced by Unity Productions Foundation.

In 2007 the Islamic Religious Council of Singapore invited Armstrong to deliver the MUIS Lecture.

Armstrong is a fellow of the Jesus Seminar, a group of scholars and laypeople which attempts to investigate the historical foundations of Christianity. She has written numerous articles for The Guardian and for other publications. She was a key advisor on Bill Moyers' popular PBS series on religion, has addressed members of the United States Congress, and was one of three scholars to speak at the UN's first ever session on religion. She is a vice-president of the British Epilepsy Association, otherwise known as Epilepsy Action.

Armstrong, who has taught courses at Leo Baeck College, a rabbinical college and centre for Jewish education located in North London, says she has been particularly inspired by the Jewish tradition's emphasis on practice as well as faith: "I say that religion isn't about believing things. It's about what you do. It's ethical alchemy. It's about behaving in a way that changes you, that gives you intimations of holiness and sacredness." She maintains that religious fundamentalism is not just a response to, but is a product of contemporary culture and for this reason concludes that, "We urgently need to make compassion a clear, luminous and dynamic force in our polarized world. Rooted in a principled determination to transcend selfishness, compassion can break down political, dogmatic, ideological and religious boundaries. Born of our deep interdependence, compassion is essential to human relationships and to a fulfilled humanity. It is the path to enlightenment, and indispensable to the creation of a just economy and a peaceful global community."

Awarded the $100,000 TED Prize in February 2008, Armstrong called for drawing up a Charter for Compassion, in the spirit of the Golden Rule, to identify shared moral priorities across religious traditions, in order to foster global understanding and a peaceful world. It was presented in Washington, D.C. in November 2009. Signatories include Queen Noor of Jordan, the Dalai Lama, Archbishop Desmond Tutu and Paul Simon.

In 2012, the Jack P. Blaney Award for Dialogue recognized her outstanding achievement in advancing understanding about and among world religions, and promoting compassion as a way of life. During her award residency in Canada, Armstrong gave the "State of the Charter for Compassion Global Address" and co-launched a compassionate cities initiative in Vancouver.

== Honours ==
In 1999 Armstrong received the Muslim Public Affairs Council's Media Award.

Armstrong was honoured by the New York Open Center in 2004 for her "profound understanding of religious traditions and their relation to the divine." She was elected a Fellow of the Royal Society of Literature in 2005.

She received an honorary degree as Doctor of Letters by Aston University in 2006.

In May 2008 she was awarded the Freedom of Worship Award by the Roosevelt Institute, one of four medals presented each year to men and women whose achievements have demonstrated a commitment to the Four Freedoms proclaimed by President Franklin D. Roosevelt in 1941 as essential to democracy: freedom of speech and of worship, freedom from want and from fear. The institute stated that Armstrong had become "a significant voice, seeking mutual understanding in times of turbulence, confrontation and violence among religious groups." It cited "her personal dedication to the ideal that peace can be found in religious understanding, for her teachings on compassion, and her appreciation for the positive sources of spirituality."

She also received the TED Prize 2008.

In 2009 she was awarded the Dr. Leopold Lucas Prize by the University of Tübingen.

Armstrong was honoured with the Nationalencyklopedin's International Knowledge Award 2011 "for her long standing work of bringing knowledge to others about the significance of religion to humankind and, in particular, for pointing out the similarities between religions. Through a series of books and award-winning lectures she reaches out as a peace-making voice at a time when world events are becoming increasingly linked to religion."

On 12 May 2010, she was made honorary Doctor of Divinity by Queen's University (Kingston, Ontario).

On 30 November 2011 (Saint Andrew's Day), Armstrong was made honorar

. Blaney Award for Dialogue for her work in advancing understanding about and among world religions.

In 2013, she was awarded the Nayef Al-Rodhan Prize for Global Cultural Understanding by the British Academy "in recognition of her body of work that has made a significant contribution to understanding the elements of overlap and commonality in different cultures and religions".

On 3 June 2014, she was made an honorary Doctor of Divinity by McGill University.

In 2017 Armstrong was bestowed Princess of Asturias award in recognition of her investigations into world religions.

== Reception ==
Armstrong was described by philosopher Alain de Botton as "one of the most intelligent contemporary defenders of religion", who "wages a vigorous war on the twin evils of religious fundamentalism and militant atheism". The Washington Post referred to her as "a prominent and prolific religious historian". Laura Miller of Salon described her as "arguably the most lucid, wide-ranging and consistently interesting religion writer today". Juan Eduardo Campo, author of the Encyclopedia of Islam (2009), included Armstrong among a group of scholars who he claimed currently conveyed a "more or less objective", as opposed to polemical, view of Islam and its origins to a wide public. After the 11 September attacks she was in great demand as a lecturer, pleading for inter-faith dialogue.

Armstrong has been criticised as misunderstanding theology and medieval history, especially in conservative publications First Things and National Review.

== Works ==
=== Books ===
External videos
- Presentation by Armstrong on The Battle for God, 6 April 2000, C-SPAN
- Booknotes interview with Armstrong on Islam: A Short History, 22 October 2000, C-SPAN
- Discussion with Armstrong on Buddha, 9 March 2001, C-SPAN
- Presentation by Armstrong on Islam: A Short History, 1 August 2002, C-SPAN
- Presentation by Armstrong on The Spiral Staircase, 8 March 2004, C-SPAN
- Presentation by Armstrong on The Great Transformation, 3 April 2006, C-SPAN
- Presentation by Armstrong on Muhammad: A Prophet for Our Time, 20 November 2006, C-SPAN
- After Words interview with Armstrong on Fields of Blood, 15 November 2014, C-SPAN

- Through the Narrow Gate. London: Pan Books. 1982. ISBN 978-0-333-31136-3.
- Beginning the World. London: Pan Books. 1983. ISBN 978-0-333-35017-1.
- The First Christian: Saint Paul's Impact on Christianity. London: Pan Books. 1983. ISBN 978-0-330-28161-4.
- Tongues of Fire: An Anthology of Religious and Poetic Experience. Editor. Harmondsworth, England: Viking Press. 1985. ISBN 978-0-670-80878-6.
- The Gospel According to Woman: Christianity's Creation of the Sex War in the West. London: Pan Books. 1986. ISBN 978-0-330-29744-8.
- Holy War: The Crusades and their Impact on Today's World. Bantam Doubleday Dell Publishing Group. 1988. ISBN 978-0385721400.
- Muhammad: A Biography of the Prophet. Victor Gollancz Ltd. 1991. ISBN 0575062444.
- The English Mystics of the Fourteenth Century. 1991.
- The End of Silence: Women and the Priesthood. 1993.
- A History of God. Alfred A. Knopf. 1993. ISBN 0-345-38456-3.
- Visions of God : Four Medieval Mystics and Their Writings. 1994.
- In the Beginning: A New Interpretation of Genesis. 1996.
- Jerusalem: One City, Three Faiths. HarperCollins. 1996. ISBN 0002555220., with better online access at idem. Ballantine Books. 2015. ISBN 9780345391681.
- Islam: A Short History. Modern Library Chronicles. 2000. ISBN 0-8129-6618-X.
- The Battle for God: Fundamentalism in Judaism, Christianity and Islam. Knopf/HarperCollins. 2000. ISBN 978-0006383482.
- Faith After 11 September. 2002.
- Buddha. Penguin. 2004. ISBN 9780143034360.
- The Spiral Staircase: My Climb Out Of Darkness. Alfred A. Knopf. 2004. ISBN 978-0-375-41318-6.
- A Short History of Myth. Canongate Books. 2005. ISBN 9781841956442.
- Muhammad: A Prophet For Our Time. HarperCollins. 2006. ISBN 978-0061155772.
- The Great Transformation: The Beginning of Our Religious Traditions. Knopf. 2006. ISBN 978-0-375-41317-9.
- The Bible: A Biography. Grove Press. 2007. ISBN 978-0-8021-4384-6.
- The Case for God. Vintage. 2009. ISBN 978-0-307-26918-8.
- Twelve Steps to a Compassionate Life. Alfred A. Knopf. 2010. ISBN 978-0-307-59559-1.
- A Letter to Pakistan. Oxford University Press. 2011. ISBN 978-0-19-906330-7.
- Fields of Blood: Religion and the History of Violence. Bodley Head. 2014. ISBN 978-1-84792-186-4.
- St. Paul: The Apostle We Love to Hate. New Harvest. 2015. ISBN 978-0-54461-739-1.
- The Lost Art of Scripture. Bodley Head. 2019. ISBN 978-1-84792-432-2.
- Religion. Vintage. 2019. ISBN 9781784875695.
- Sacred Nature: Restoring Our Ancient Bond with the Natural World. Knopf. 2022. ISBN 978-0593319437.

=== Journal articles ===
- "Women, Tourism, Politics". Anthropological Quarterly. 50 (3): 135–145. 1977. doi:10.2307/3317593. ISSN 0003-5491. JSTOR 3317593.
- "The Holiness of Jerusalem: Asset or Burden?" (PDF). Journal of Palestine Studies. 27 (3): 5–19. 1998. doi:10.2307/2537831. ISSN 0377-919X. JSTOR 2537831.
- "The deep roots of Islamic State : Wahhabism – and how Saudi Arabia exported the main source of global terrorism". Cover Story. New Statesman. 143 (5237): 26, 28, 31. 21 November 2014.

== See also ==
- Abrahamic religions
- Interfaith dialogue
