= East–West Schism =

Break of communion between the Western and Eastern churches

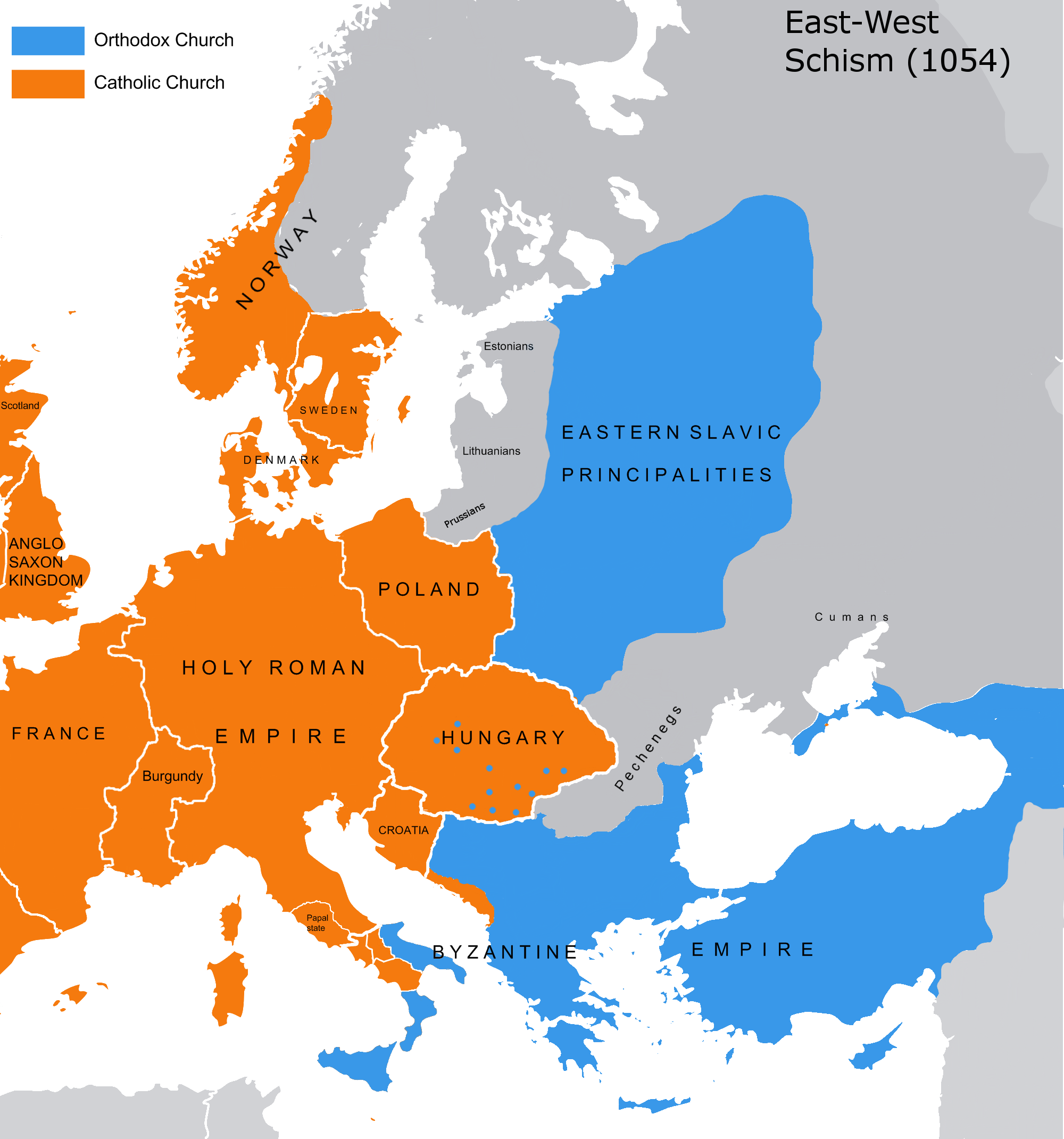
- The divided church following the schism
- Date: 16 July 1054 – present (972 years, 4 months and 5 days)
- Also known as: Great Schism; Schism of 1054; Eastern Schism; Latin Schism
- Type: Christian schism
- Cause: Ecclesiastical differences; Theological and liturgical disputes
- Participants: Pope Leo IX; Ecumenical Patriarch Michael I Cerularius
- Outcome: Split of the two churches into the modern-day Catholic Church (from which the Protestant Church later broke off) and Eastern Orthodox Church to this day

The East–West Schism, also known as the Great Schism or the Schism of 1054, is the break of communion between the Catholic Church and the Eastern Orthodox Church since 1054. A series of ecclesiastical differences, theological disputes and geopolitical tensions between the Greek East and Latin West preceded the formal split in 1054. Prominent among these were the Filioque clause of the Nicene Creed, whether leavened or unleavened bread should be used in the Eucharist, (Note: A late-11th-century pamphlet, Against the Franks, that was falsely attributed to Photios I of Constantinople lists this as the second point, right after the Filioque.) iconoclasm, the coronation of Charlemagne as emperor of the Romans in 800, the pope's claim to universal jurisdiction, and the place of the See of Constantinople in relation to the pentarchy. Although 1054 has become conventional, various scholars have proposed different dates for the Great Schism, including 1009, 1204, 1277, and 1484.

The first action that led to a formal schism occurred in 1053 when Patriarch Michael I Cerularius of Constantinople ordered the closure of all Latin churches in Constantinople. In 1054, the papal legate sent by Leo IX travelled to Constantinople to deny Cerularius the title of "ecumenical patriarch" and insist that he recognize the pope's claim to be the head of all of the churches, and to seek help from the Byzantine emperor, Constantine IX Monomachos, in view of the Norman conquest of southern Italy, and to respond to Leo of Ohrid's attacks on the use of unleavened bread and other Western customs, attacks that had the support of Cerularius. When the leader of the legation, Cardinal Humbert of Silva Candida, learned that Cerularius had refused to accept the demand, he excommunicated him, and in response Cerularius excommunicated Humbert and the other legates.

The validity of the Western legates' act is doubtful because Pope Leo had died and Cerularius' excommunication only applied to the legates personally. Still, the church split along doctrinal, theological, linguistic, political, and geographical lines, and the fundamental breach has never been healed: each side occasionally accuses the other of committing heresy and of having initiated the schism. Reconciliation was made increasingly difficult in the generations that followed; events such as the Latin-led Crusades, though originally intended to aid the Eastern Church, only served to further tension. In 1185, the Normans sacked Thessalonica, while the schism culminated in the sack and pillage of Constantinople during the Fourth Crusade in 1204, and the imposition of Latin patriarchs. The emergence of competing Greek and Latin hierarchies in the Crusader states, especially with two claimants to the patriarchal sees of Antioch, Constantinople, and Jerusalem, made the existence of a schism clear. Several attempts at reconciliation did not bear fruit.

In 1965, Pope Paul VI and Ecumenical Patriarch Athenagoras I nullified the anathemas of 1054, although this was merely a gesture of goodwill and did not constitute a reunion. The absence of full communion between the churches is even explicitly mentioned when the Code of Canon Law gives Catholic ministers permission to administer the sacraments of penance, the Eucharist, and the anointing of the sick to members of eastern churches such as the Eastern Orthodox Church (as well as the Oriental Orthodox churches and the Church of the East) and members of western churches such as the Old Catholic Church, when those members spontaneously request these. Contacts between the two sides continue. Every year a delegation from each joins in the other's celebration of its patronal feast, Saints Peter and Paul (29 June) for Rome and Saint Andrew (30 November) for Constantinople, and there have been several visits by the head of each to the other. The efforts of the ecumenical patriarchs towards reconciliation with the Catholic Church have often been the target of sharp internal criticism.

== Differences underlying the schism ==
Jaroslav Pelikan emphasizes that "while the East–West schism stemmed largely from political and ecclesiastical discord, this discord also reflected basic theological differences". Pelikan further argues that the antagonists in the 11th century inappropriately exaggerated their theological differences, whereas modern historians tend to minimize them. Pelikan asserts that the documents from that era evidence the "depths of intellectual alienation that had developed between the two sections of Christendom." While the two sides were technically more guilty of schism than of heresy, they often charged each other with blasphemy. Pelikan describes much of the dispute as dealing with "regional differences in usages and customs", some of which were adiaphorous (i.e., neither commanded nor forbidden). However, he goes on to say that while it was easy in principle to accept the existence of adiaphora, it was difficult in actual practice to distinguish customs which were innocuously adiaphoric from those that had doctrinal implications.

=== Ecclesiological disputes ===
Philip Sherrard, an English Eastern Orthodox theologian, asserted that the underlying cause of the East–West schism was and continues to be "the clash of these two fundamentally irreconcilable ecclesiologies". Roger Haight characterized the question of episcopal authority in the church as "acute" with the "relative standings of Rome and Constantinople a recurrent source of tension". Haight further characterized the difference in ecclesiologies as "the contrast between a pope with universal jurisdiction and a combination of the patriarchal superstructure with an episcopal and synodal communion ecclesiology analogous to that found in Cyprian". However, Nicholas Afanasiev has criticized both the Catholic and Orthodox churches for "subscribing to the universal ecclesiology of St. Cyprian of Carthage according to which only one true and universal church can exist".

==== Ecclesiological structure ====
There are several different ecclesiologies: "communion ecclesiology", "eucharistic ecclesiology", "baptismal ecclesiology", "trinitarian ecclesiology", and "kerygmatic theology". Other ecclesiologies are the "hierarchical-institutional" and the "organic-mystical", and the "congregationalist".

The Eastern Churches maintained the idea that every local city-church with its bishop, presbyters, deacons, and people celebrating the eucharist constituted the whole church. In this view called eucharistic ecclesiology (or more recently, holographic ecclesiology), every bishop is Peter's successor in his church ("the Church"), and the churches form what Eusebius of Caesarea called a common union of churches. This implied that all bishops were ontologically equal, although functionally particular bishops could be granted special privileges by other bishops and serve as metropolitan bishops, archbishops or patriarchs. Within the Roman Empire, from the time of Constantine the Great to the fall of Constantinople (and the empire) in 1453, universal ecclesiology, rather than eucharistic, became the operative principle.

The view prevailed that, "when the Roman Empire became Christian the perfect world order willed by God had been achieved: one universal empire was sovereign and coterminous with it was the one universal church". Early on, the Roman Church's ecclesiology was universal, with the idea that the church was a worldwide organism with a divinely (not functionally) appointed center: the Church/Bishop of Rome. These two views are still present in modern Eastern Orthodoxy and Catholicism and can be seen as foundational causes of the schisms, including the Great Schism between East and West.

The Orthodox Church does not accept the doctrine of papal authority outlined in the First Vatican Council (1869–1870), and taught today in the Catholic Church. The Orthodox Church has always maintained the original position of the bishops' collegiality, resulting in a church structure closer to a confederation. The Orthodox have synods in which the highest authorities in each church community are brought together, but unlike the Catholic Church, no central individual or figure has the absolute, infallible last word on church doctrine. In practice, this has sometimes led to divisions among Greek, Russian, Bulgarian, and Ukrainian Orthodox churches, as no central authority can serve as an arbitrator for various internal disputes.

Since the second half of the 20th century, eucharistic ecclesiology has been upheld by Catholic theologians. Henri de Lubac writes: "The Church, like the Eucharist, is a mystery of unity—the same mystery, and one with inexhaustible riches. Both are the body of Christ—the same body." Joseph Ratzinger called eucharistic ecclesiology "the real core of Vatican II's (Second Vatican Council) teaching on the cross". According to Ratzinger, the one church of God exists in no other way than in the various individual local congregations. In these, the eucharist is celebrated in union with the church everywhere. Eucharistic ecclesiology led the council to "affirm the theological significance of the local church. If each celebration of the Eucharist is a matter not only of Christ's sacramental presence on the altar but also of his ecclesial presence in the gathered community, then each local eucharistic church must be more than a subset of the universal church; it must be the body of Christ 'in that place'."

The ecclesiological dimension of the East–West schism revolves around the authority of bishops within their dioceses and the lines of authority between bishops of different dioceses. It is common for Catholics to insist on the primacy of Roman and papal authority based on patristic writings and conciliar documents.

==== Papal privilege and authority ====
The Catholic Church's current official teachings about papal privilege and power that are unacceptable to the Eastern Orthodox churches are the dogma of the pope's infallibility when speaking officially "from the chair of Peter (ex cathedra Petri)" on matters of faith and morals to be held by the whole church, so that such definitions are irreformable "of themselves, and not by the consent of the Church" (ex sese et non-ex consensu ecclesiae) and have a binding character for all (Catholic) Christians in the world; the pope's direct episcopal jurisdiction over all (Catholic) Christians in the world; the pope's authority to appoint (and so also to dismiss) the bishops of all (Catholic) Christian churches except in the territory of a patriarchate; and the affirmation that the legitimacy and authority of all (Catholic) Christian bishops in the world derive from their union with the Roman see and its bishop.

Principal among the ecclesiastical issues separating the two churches is the meaning of papal primacy in any future unified church. The Orthodox insist that it should be a "primacy of honor", and not a "primacy of authority", whereas the Catholics see the pontiff's role as required for its exercise of power and authority, the exact form of which is open to discussion with other Christians. (Note: In 1995, John Paul II wrote: "With the power and the authority without which such an office would be illusory, the Bishop of Rome must ensure the communion of all the Churches." He invited "Church leaders and their theologians to examine with me in a patient and fraternal dialogue on this subject, a dialogue in which, leaving useless controversies behind, we could listen to one another, keeping before us only the will of Christ for his Church and allowing ourselves to be deeply moved by his plea 'that they may all be one ... so that the world may believe that you have sent me'". The Ravenna document of 13 October 2007 is one response to this invitation.) According to Eastern Orthodox belief, the test of catholicity is adherence to the authority of Scripture and then by the Holy Tradition of the church. It is not defined by adherence to any particular see. The Orthodox Church holds that it has never accepted the pope as the de jure leader of the entire church.

Referring to Ignatius of Antioch, Carlton says:

Contrary to popular opinion, the word catholic does not mean "universal"; it means "whole, complete, lacking nothing." ... Thus, to confess the Church to be catholic is to say that She possesses the fullness of the Christian faith. To say, however, that Orthodox and Rome constitute two lungs of the same Church is to deny that either Church separately is catholic in any meaningful sense of the term. This is not only contrary to the teaching of Orthodoxy, it is flatly contrary to the teaching of the Roman Catholic Church, which considered itself truly catholic

— Carlton 2007, p. 22

The church is in the image of the Trinity and reflects the reality of the incarnation.

The body of Christ must always be equal with itself ... The local church which manifests the body of Christ cannot be subsumed into any larger organisation or collectivity which makes it more catholic and more in unity, for the simple reason that the principle of total catholicity and total unity is already intrinsic to it.

— Sherrard 1996, p. 15

=== Theological issues ===
The iconoclast policy enforced by a series of decrees of Emperor Leo III the Isaurian in 726–729 was resisted in the West, giving rise to friction that ended in 787, when the Second Council of Nicaea reaffirmed that images are to be venerated but not worshipped. The Libri Carolini, commissioned by Charlemagne, criticized what a faulty translation gave as the council's decision, but their objections were rebutted by Pope Adrian I.

From the Catholic Church's perspective, ecclesiological issues are central, which is why it characterizes the split between the two churches as a schism. In their view, the Eastern Orthodox are close to them in theology, and the Catholic Church does not consider the Eastern Orthodox beliefs to be heretical. However, from the perspective of Eastern Orthodox theologians, there are theological issues that run much deeper than just the theology around the primacy of the Pope. In fact, this is in contrast to Catholics, who do not generally consider the Orthodox heretical and speak instead about the Eastern "schism".

In the Catholic Church, too, some writers may be found who speak pejoratively about the Eastern Orthodox Church and its theology, but these writers are marginal.

The official view of the Catholic Church is the one expressed in the decree Unitatis redintegratio of Vatican II:

In the study of revelation East and West have followed different methods, and have developed differently their understanding and confession of God's truth. It is hardly surprising, then, if from time to time one tradition has come nearer to a full appreciation of some aspects of a mystery of revelation than the other, or has expressed it to better advantage. In such cases, these various theological expressions are to be considered often as mutually complementary rather than conflicting. Where the authentic theological traditions of the Eastern Church are concerned, we must recognize the admirable way in which they have their roots in Holy Scripture, and how they are nurtured and given expression in the life of the liturgy. They derive their strength too from the living tradition of the apostles and from the works of the Fathers and spiritual writers of the Eastern Churches. Thus they promote the right ordering of Christian life and, indeed, pave the way to a full vision of Christian truth.

==== Trinity ====
Although the Western churches do not consider the Eastern and Western understanding of the Trinity to be radically different, Eastern theologians such as John Romanides and Michael Pomazansky argue that the Filioque clause is symptomatic of a fatal flaw in the Western understanding, which they attribute to the influence of Augustine and, by extension, to that of Thomas Aquinas.

Filioque, Latin for "and (from) the Son", was added in Western Christianity to the Latin text of the Nicene-Constantinopolitan Creed, which also varies from the original Greek text in having the additional phrase Deum de Deo (God from God) and in using the singular "I believe" (Latin: Credo, Ancient Greek: Πιστεύω) instead of the original "we believe" (Ancient Greek: Πιστεύομεν), which the Oriental Orthodox Churches and the Church of the East also preserve. (Note: Oriental Orthodox churches: Armenian Apostolic Church; Coptic Orthodox Church of Alexandria; Eritrean Orthodox Tewahedo Church; Ethiopian Orthodox Tewahedo Church; Malankara Orthodox Syrian Church; Syriac Orthodox Church; Churches belonging to the Church of the East tradition: Assyrian Church of the East; Ancient Church of the East)

Filioque states that the Holy Spirit proceeds from the Son as well as from the Father, a doctrine accepted by the Catholic Church, by Anglicanism and by Protestant churches in general. (Note: Protestant churches: Lutheranism; Presbyterianism; Methodism) Christians of these groups generally include it when reciting the Nicene Creed. Nonetheless, these groups recognize that Filioque is not part of the original text established at the First Council of Constantinople in 381, and they do not demand that others too should use it when saying the Creed. The Catholic Church does not add the phrase corresponding to Filioque (καὶ τοῦ Υἱοῦ) to the Greek text of the Creed, including in the Roman Rite of Latin Church Catholics.

At the 879–880 Council of Constantinople, the Eastern Orthodox Church anathematized the Filioque phrase, "as a novelty and augmentation of the Creed", and in their 1848 encyclical, the Eastern Patriarchs spoke of it as a heresy. It was qualified as such by some of the Eastern Orthodox Church's saints, including Photios I of Constantinople, Mark of Ephesus, and Gregory Palamas, who have been called the Three Pillars of Orthodoxy. The Eastern church believes by the Western church inserting the Filioque unilaterally (without consulting or holding council with the East) into the Creed, that the Western Church broke communion with the East.

Eastern Orthodox theologians such as Vladimir Lossky criticize the focus of Western theology of God in "God in uncreated essence" as misguided, which he alleges is a modalistic and therefore a speculative expression of God that is indicative of the Sabellian heresy. Eastern Orthodox theologian Michael Pomazansky argues that, in order for the Holy Spirit to proceed from the Father and the Son in the Creed, there would have to be two sources in the deity (double procession), whereas in the one God there can only be one source of divinity, which is the Father hypostasis of the Trinity, not God's essence per se. In contrast, Bishop Kallistos Ware suggests that the problem is more in the area of semantics than of basic doctrinal differences:

The Filioque controversy which has separated us for so many centuries is more than a mere technicality, but it is not insoluble. Qualifying the firm position taken when I wrote The Orthodox Church twenty years ago, I now believe, after further study, that the problem is more in the area of semantics than in any basic doctrinal differences.

— Bishop Kallistos Ware, Diakonia, Zoghby 1992, p. 43

==== Experience of God versus scholasticism ====
Lossky argues that the difference between East and West lies in the Catholic Church's use of pagan metaphysical philosophy (and scholasticism) rather than the actual experience of God, called theoria, to validate the theological dogmas of Catholic Christianity. For this reason, Lossky states that Eastern Orthodox and Catholics have become "different men". Other Eastern Orthodox theologians such as Romanides and Metropolitan Hierotheos of Nafpaktos have made similar pronouncements. According to the Orthodox teachings, theoria can be achieved through ascetic practices like hesychasm, which was condemned as a heresy by Barlaam of Seminara.

Eastern Orthodox theologians charge that, in contrast to Eastern Orthodox theology, Western theology is based on philosophical discourse that reduces humanity and nature to cold, mechanical concepts.

Roman Catholicism rationalizes even the sacrament of the Eucharist: it interprets spiritual action as purely material and debases the sacrament to such an extent that it becomes in its view a kind of atomistic miracle. The Orthodox Church has no metaphysical theory of Transubstantiation, and there is no need of such a theory. Christ is the Lord of the elements and it is in His power to do so that 'every thing, without in the least changing its physical substance' could become His Body. Christ's Body in the Eucharist is not physical flesh.

— Lossky 1969, p. 87

Eastern Orthodox theologians argue that the mind (reason, rationality) is the focus of Western theology, whereas, in Eastern theology, the mind must be put in the heart, so they are united into what is called nous; this unity as heart is the focus of Eastern Orthodox Christianity, involving the unceasing prayer of the heart. In Orthodox theology and the Eastern ascetic traditions, one of the goals of ascetic practice is to attain sobriety of consciousness, awakeness (nepsis). For humankind, this is reached via the healing of the whole person, encompassing the soul/heart. When a person's heart is reconciled with their mind, this is referred to as a healing of the nous or the "eye, focus of the heart or soul".

Part of this process is the healing and reconciliation of humankind's reason (logos or dianoia) with the heart or soul. While the human spirit and body are energies vivified by the soul, Orthodoxy teaches that sin, suffering, and sorrow are caused by the heart and mind being in conflict. According to Orthodox theology, a lack of noetic understanding (sickness) can be neither circumvented nor satisfied by rational or discursive thought (i.e. systematization). Denying the needs of the human heart (the needs of the soul) is seen to cause various negative or destructive manifestations such as addiction, atheism and evil thoughts. A cleaned, healed or restored nous creates the condition of sobriety, or nepsis of the mind.

==== Uncreated light ====
Orthodox theologians assert that the theological division of East and West culminated in a direct theological conflict known as the Hesychasm controversy during several councils at Constantinople between 1341 and 1351. They argue that this controversy highlighted the sharp contrast between what the Catholic Church embraces as proper (or orthodox) theological dogma and how theology is validated in the Eastern Orthodox tradition. The essence of the disagreement is that, in the East, a person cannot be a true theologian or teach the knowledge of God without having experienced God, as defined by the vision of God (theoria). At the heart of the issue was the teaching of the Essence-Energies distinctions (which states that while creation can never know God's uncreated essence, it can know his uncreated energies) by Gregory Palamas.

==== Original sin, free will, and the Immaculate Conception ====
===== Augustine's doctrine of original sin =====
Some Eastern Orthodox polemicists claim that Eastern Orthodox do not accept Augustine's teaching of original sin. His interpretation of ancestral sin is rejected in the East as well. Nor is Augustine's teaching accepted in its totality in the West. The Catholic Church rejects traducianism and affirms creationism of the soul. Its teaching on original sin is largely based on but not identical with that of Augustine, and is opposed to the interpretation of Augustine advanced by Martin Luther and John Calvin. Its teaching departs from Augustine's ideas in some respects.

Another Eastern Orthodox view is expressed by Christos Yannaras, who described Augustine as "the fount of every distortion and alteration in the Church's truth in the West". This view is ahistorical. In fact, Augustine's teaching on original sin was solemnly affirmed by the ecumenical Council of Ephesus, and the ecumenical Second Council of Constantinople numbered Augustine among the great Doctors of the Church, alongside Athanasius of Alexandria, Hilary of Poitiers, Basil of Caesarea, Gregory of Nazianzus, Gregory of Nyssa, Ambrose, Theophilus, John Chrysostom, Cyril of Alexandria, and Pope Leo the Great. The late modern denial by some Eastern Orthodox writers of the supposedly "Western" teaching on original sin is regarded by some traditionalist Eastern Orthodox as a form of modernism.

===== Eastern Orthodox teaching on original sin =====
What the Eastern Orthodox Church accepts is that ancestral sin corrupted their existence (their bodies and environment) that each person is born into, and thus we are born into a corrupted existence (by the ancestral sin of Adam and Eve) and that "original sin is hereditary. It did not remain only Adam and Eve's. As life passes from them to all of their descendants, so does original sin. All of us participate in original sin because we are all descended from the same forefather, Adam." The teaching of the Eastern Orthodox Church is that, as a result of Adam's sin, "hereditary sin flowed to his posterity; so that everyone who is born after the flesh bears this burden, and experiences the fruits of it in this present world."

Similarly, what the Catholic Church holds is that the sin of Adam that we inherit, and for the remission of which even babies who have no personal sin are baptized, is called "sin" only in an analogical sense since it is not an act committed like the personal sin of Adam and Eve, but a fallen state contracted by the transmission of a human nature deprived of original holiness and justice.

Both East and West hold that each person is not called to atone for the actual sin committed by Adam and Eve.

According to the Western Church, "original sin does not have the character of a personal fault in any of Adam's descendants", and the Eastern Church teaches that "by these fruits and this burden we do not understand [actual] sin". The Orthodox and the Catholics believe that people inherit only the spiritual sickness (in which all suffer and sin) of Adam and Eve, caused by their ancestral sin (what has flowed to them), a sickness leaving them weakened in their powers, subject to ignorance, suffering from the domination of death, and inclined to sin.

===== Immaculate Conception =====
The Catholic doctrine of the Immaculate Conception, which claims that God protected the Virgin Mary from original sin through no merit of her own, was dogmatically defined by Pope Pius IX in 1854. Orthodox theology proclaims that Mary was chosen to bear Christ, having first found favor of God by her purity and obedience.

==== Sin, purgatory, and hell ====
===== Purgatory =====
Another point of theological contention between the Western and Eastern churches is the doctrine of purgatory (as it was shown at the Second Council of Lyon and the Council of Ferrara–Florence). It was developed in time in Western theology, according to which "all who die in God's grace and friendship, but still imperfectly purified, are indeed assured of their eternal salvation; but after death they undergo purification, so as to achieve the holiness necessary to enter the joy of heaven." However, some Eastern theologians, while agreeing that there is beyond death a state in which believers continue to be perfected and led to full divinization, consider that it is a state not of punishment but of growth. They hold that suffering cannot purify sin, since they have a different view of sin and consider suffering as a result of a spiritual sickness. Western theology usually considers sin not only as a sickness that weakens and impedes but also as something that merits punishment.

The Eastern Orthodox Church holds that "there is a state beyond death where believers continue to be perfected and led to full divinization". Although some Orthodox have described this intermediate state as purgatory, others distinguish it from aspects associated with it in the West: at the Council of Ferrara–Florence, the Orthodox Bishop Mark of Ephesus argued that there are in it no purifying fires.

Some Orthodox Christians also subscribe to the belief of aerial toll houses, which states that souls are tested by demons while on their way to Heaven. This concept is not found in Roman Catholicism.

===== Damnation =====
The traditional Orthodox teaching is that those who reject Christ will suffer his absence. According to the Confession of Dositheus, "persons go immediately to joy in Christ or to the torments of punishment". In Orthodox doctrine, there is no place without God. In eternity, there is no hiding from God. In Catholic theology, God is present everywhere, not only by his power but in himself. Hell is a state of self-selected separation from God.

Eastern theology considers the desire to sin to be the result of a spiritual sickness (caused by Adam and Eve's pride), which needs to be cured. One such theologian gives his interpretation of Western theology as follows: "According to the holy Fathers of the Church, there is not an uncreated Paradise and a created Hell, as the Franco–Latin tradition teaches". The Eastern Church believes that hell and heaven exist with reference to being with God, and that the very same divine love (God's uncreated energies) which is a source of bliss and consolation for the righteous (because they love God, his love is heaven for them) is also a source of torment (or a "Lake of Fire") for sinners. The Western Church speaks of heaven and hell as states of existence rather than as places, while in Eastern Orthodoxy there is no hell per se, there is a "hell" in the absence of God's grace. To quote St John of Damascus: "God does not punish, but each one decides on his receiving of God, whose reception is joy and his absence a hell (Gr. κόλασις)".

=== Governance ===
The Byzantine Empire was a theocracy; the emperor was the supreme authority in both church and state. "The king is not God among men but the Viceroy of God. He is not the logos incarnate but is in a special relation with the logos. He has been specially appointed and is continually inspired by God, the friend of God, the interpreter of the Word of God. His eyes look upward to receive the messages of God. He must be surrounded with the reverence and glory that befits God's earthly copy; and he will 'frame his earthly government according to the pattern of the divine original, finding strength in its conformity with the monarchy of God'".

In the East, endorsement of caesaropapism, the subordination of the church to the religious claims of the dominant political order, was most fully evident in the Byzantine Empire at the end of the first millennium, while in the West, where the decline of imperial authority left the church relatively independent, there was a growth in the power of the papacy. As a result of the Muslim conquests of the territories of the patriarchates of Alexandria, Antioch, and Jerusalem, only two rival powerful centres of ecclesiastical authority, Constantinople and Rome, remained. Until this happened, Rome often tried to act as a neutral mediator in disputes among the Eastern patriarchates.

In Eastern Christendom, the teaching of papal supremacy is said to be based on the pseudo-Isidorian Decretals, documents attributed to early popes but actually forged, probably in the second quarter of the 9th century, with the aim of defending the position of bishops against metropolitans and secular authorities. The Orthodox East contests the teaching that Peter was the Patriarch of Rome, a title that the West too does not give him. Early sources, such as Irenaeus, can be interpreted as describing Pope Linus as the first bishop of Rome and Pope Cletus as the second.

The Oxford Dictionary of Popes states: "In the late 2nd or early 3rd cent[ury] the tradition identified Peter as the first bishop of Rome. This was a natural development once the monarchical episcopate, i.e. the government of the local church by a single bishop, as distinct from a group of presbyter-bishops, finally emerged in Rome in the mid-2nd cent. The earlier tradition, however, which placed Peter and Paul in a class apart as the pioneers who together established the Roman church and its ministry, was never lost sight of."

Peter was, according to tradition, bishop of Antioch at one point, and was then succeeded by Evodius and Ignatius. The Eastern Orthodox teach that the Pope of Rome is first among equals. The first seven Ecumenical Councils were held in the East and called by the Eastern Emperors; the Roman pontiff never presided over any of them. (Note: The Orthodox attitude to the papacy is expressed by a 12th-century writer, Nicetas, Archbishop of Nicomedia: My dearest brother, we do not deny to the Roman Church the primacy amongst the five sister Patriarchates; and we recognize her right to the most honorable seat at an Ecumenical Council. But she has separated herself from us by her own deeds, when through pride she assumed a monarchy which does not belong to her office ... How shall we accept decrees from her that have been issued without consulting us and even without our knowledge? If the Roman Pontiff, seated on the lofty throne of his glory, wishes to thunder at us and, so to speak, hurl his mandates at us from on high, and if he wishes to judge us and even to rule us and our Churches, not by taking counsel with us but at his own arbitrary pleasure, what kind of brotherhood, or even what kind of parenthood can this be? We should be the slaves, not the sons, of such a Church, and the Roman See would not be the pious mother of sons but a hard and imperious mistress of slaves —)

== History ==
The schism between the Western and Eastern Mediterranean Christians resulted from a variety of political, cultural and theological factors which transpired over centuries. Historians regard the mutual excommunications of 1054 as the terminal event. It is difficult to agree on a date for the event where the start of the schism was apparent. It may have started as early as the Quartodeciman controversy at the time of Victor of Rome (c. 180). Orthodox apologists point to this incident as an example of claims by Rome to the papal primacy and its rejection by Eastern Churches.

Sporadic schisms in the common unions took place under Pope Damasus I in the 4th and 5th centuries. Disputes about theological and other questions led to schisms between the Churches in Rome and Constantinople for 37 years from 482 to 519 (the Acacian Schism). Most sources agree that the separation between East and West is clearly evident by the Photian schism in 863 to 867.

=== Claims of the See of Rome ===
While the church at Rome claimed a special authority over the other churches based on the primacy of Peter, the extant documents of that era yield "no clear-cut claims to, or recognition, of papal primacy."

Towards the end of the 2nd century, Victor, the Bishop of Rome, attempted to resolve the Quartodeciman controversy. The question was whether to celebrate Easter concurrently with the Jewish Passover, as Christians in the Roman province of Asia did, or to wait until the following Sunday, as was decreed by synods held in other Eastern provinces, such as those of Palestine and Pontus, the acts of which were still extant at the time of Eusebius, and in Rome. The pope attempted to excommunicate the churches in Asia, which refused to accept the observance on Sunday. Other bishops rebuked him for doing so. Laurent Cleenewerck comments:

Victor obviously claimed superior authority, probably from St. Peter, and decided – or at least "attempted" to excommunicate a whole group of Churches because they followed a different tradition and refused to conform. One could therefore argue that the Great schism started with Victor, continued with Stephen and remained underground until the ninth century! But the question is this: even if Victor was not acting wisely, did he not have the power to "cut off whole Churches"? This is what Roman Catholics argue with the implication that such an excommunication would be ontologically meaningful and put someone "outside the Catholic Church". Yet, we do not see bishops "pleading" but indeed "sharply rebuking" and "admonishing" Victor. Ultimately this is why his letters of excommunication came to no effect. Nevertheless it is possible to read in Eusebius' account the possibility that St. Irenaeus recognized that Victor could indeed "cut off whole Churches" and that such excommunication would have been ontologically meaningful. ... In the end, it took some patience and an Ecumenical Council to achieve what Victor could not achieve by his threat to excommunicate.

Despite Victor's failure to carry out his intent to excommunicate the Asian churches, a number of Catholic apologists point to this episode as evidence of papal primacy and authority in the early church, citing the fact that none of the bishops challenged his right to excommunicate but instead questioned the wisdom and charity of his action. Anglican apologists question the premise that Victor even asserted what he imagined to be supremacy:

Victor’s action is inexplicable on the hypothesis that the Papal Monarchy is jure divino. If that were so, he must have adopted, in discharge of his duty as Supreme Shepherd, a very different course. He, the Supreme judge, having 'supreme jurisdiction' which is 'immediate,' 'ordinary,' and 'truly Episcopal,' over the Asiatic churches, would have commanded them by his 'real and sovereign authority, which the whole community is bound to obey'—which could receive no increase of authority from Synods—to conform their usage to his judgment, which could not be reviewed. A man, too, of his temperament would certainly not fail to use to the uttermost whatever authority he possessed. His action shows that, however harshly he may in his intolerance have pressed the matter, he evidently had no idea that any such 'sovereign' power was possessed by him.

The opinion of the bishop of Rome was often sought, especially when the patriarchs of the Eastern Mediterranean were locked in fractious dispute. However, the bishop of Rome's opinion was by no means accepted automatically. The bishops of Rome never obviously belonged to either the Antiochian or the Alexandrian schools of theology, and usually managed to steer a middle course between whatever extremes were being propounded by theologians of either school. Because Rome was remote from the centers of Christianity in the eastern Mediterranean, it was frequently hoped its bishop would be more impartial. For instance, in 431, Cyril, the patriarch of Alexandria, appealed to Pope Celestine I, as well as the other patriarchs, charging Constantinople Patriarch Nestorius with heresy, which was dealt with at the Council of Ephesus. He nevertheless believed Rome's capacity to excommunicate Nestorius to only be effective in the West.

In 342, Pope Julius I wrote: "The custom has been for word to be written first to us [in the case of bishops under accusation, and notably in apostolic churches], and then for a just sentence to be passed from this place". This was also decreed by the Council of Sardica, which declared Athanasius to be the lawful bishop of Alexandria.

In 382 a synod in Rome protested against the raising of Constantinople to a position above that of Alexandria and spoke of Rome as "the apostolic see". Pope Siricius (384–399) claimed for papal decretals the same binding force as decisions of synods, Pope Innocent I (401–417) said that all major judicial cases should be reserved for the see of Rome, and Pope Boniface I (418–422) declared that the church of Rome stands to "the churches throughout the world as the head to its members" and that bishops everywhere, while holding the one same episcopal office, must "recognise those to whom, for the sake of ecclesiastical discipline, they should be subject".

Celestine I (r. 422–432) considered that the condemnation of Nestorius by his own Roman synod in 430 was sufficient, but consented to the general council as "of benefit in manifesting the faith". (Note: The First Council of Ephesus in 431 stated that it condemned Nestorius "compelled thereto by the canons and by the letter of our most holy father and fellow-servant Coelestine, the Roman bishop") Pope Leo I and his successors rejected canon 28 of the Council of Chalcedon, as a result of which it was not officially recorded even in the East until the 6th century. The Acacian schism, when, "for the first time, West lines up against East in a clear-cut fashion", ended with acceptance of a declaration insisted on by Pope Hormisdas (514–523) that "I hope I shall remain in communion with the apostolic see in which is found the whole, true, and perfect stability of the Christian religion". Yet, "the vast majority of the Eastern Bishops subscribed quite a different Formula."

Earlier, in 494, Pope Gelasius I (492–496) wrote to Byzantine emperor, Anastasius, distinguishing the power of civil rulers from that of the bishops (called "priests" in the document), with the latter supreme in religious matters; he ended his letter with: "And if it is fitting that the hearts of the faithful should submit to all priests in general who properly administer divine affairs, how much the more is obedience due to the bishop of that see which the Most High ordained to be above all others, and which is consequently dutifully honoured by the devotion of the whole Church." Pope Nicholas I (858–867) made it clear that he believed the power of the papacy extended "over all the earth, that is, over every church".

=== Claims of the See of Constantinople ===
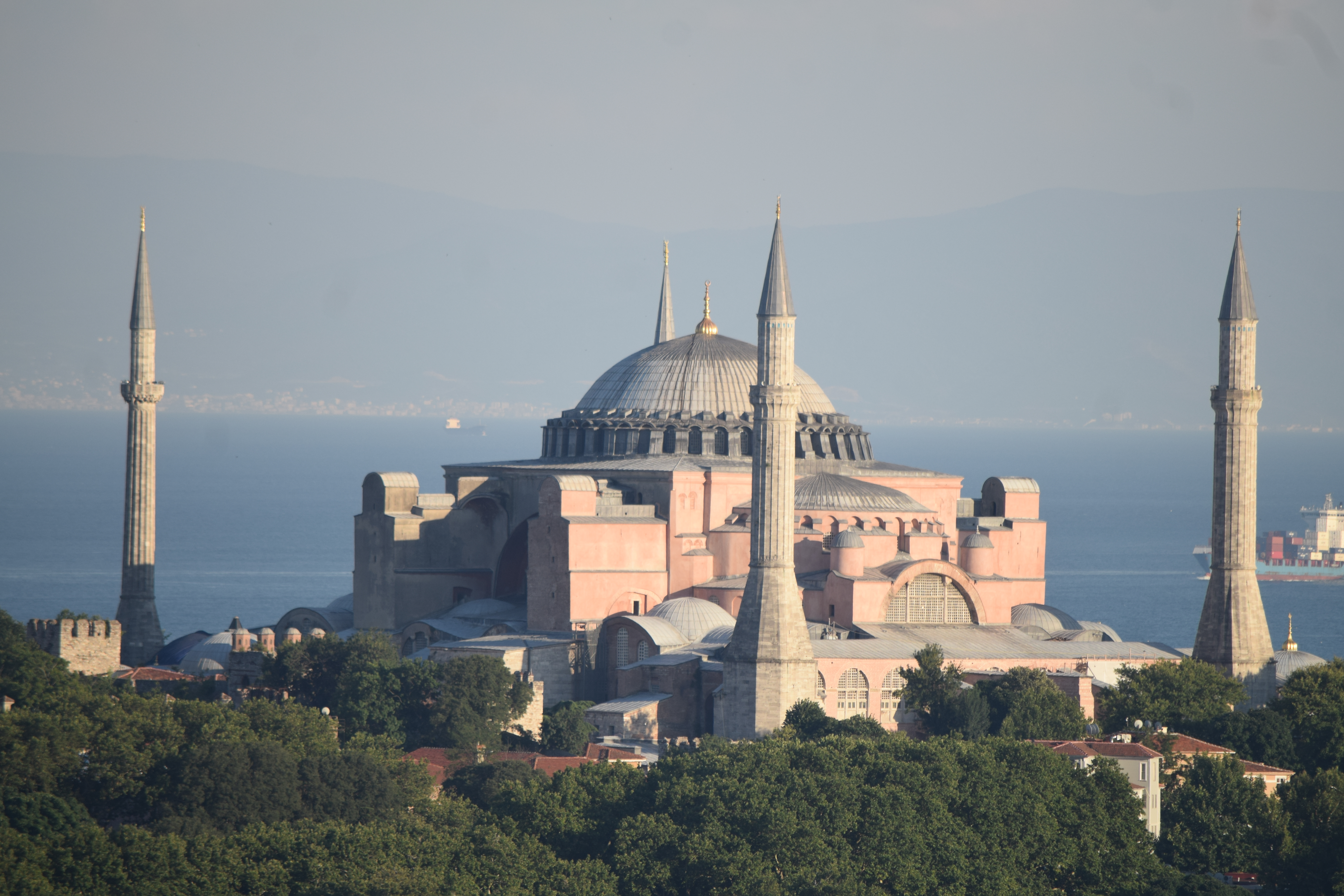
Hagia Sophia, the cathedral of Constantinople at the time of the schism

In 330, Emperor Constantine moved the imperial capital to Byzantium, which later became Constantinople. The centre of gravity in the empire was fully recognised to have completely shifted to the eastern Mediterranean. Rome lost the Senate to Constantinople and lost its status and gravitas as imperial capital. (Note: See also the Fall of Rome)

The bishop of Byzantium was under the authority of the metropolitan of Heraclea when Constantine moved there. Thereafter, the bishop's connection with the imperial court meant that he was able to free himself from ecclesiastical dependency on Heraclea and in little more than half a century to obtain recognition of next-after-Rome ranking from the First Council of Constantinople (381), held in the new capital. It decreed: "The Bishop of Constantinople, however, shall have the prerogative of honour after the Bishop of Rome; because Constantinople is New Rome", thus raising it above the sees of Alexandria and Antioch. This has been described as sowing the seed for the ecclesiastical rivalry between Constantinople and Rome that was a factor leading to the schism between East and West. The website of the Orthodox Church in America says that the Bishop of Byzantium was elevated to Patriarch already in the time of Constantine.

Disunion in the Roman Empire contributed to disunion in the church. Theodosius the Great, who in 380 established Nicene Christianity as the official religion of the Roman Empire (see Edict of Thessalonica), was the last Emperor to rule over a united Roman Empire. Following the death of Theodosius in 395, the Empire was divided for the final time into western and eastern halves. In the 4th century, the Roman emperor (reigning in Constantinople) started to control the church in his territory.

The patriarchs of Constantinople often tried to adopt a commanding position over the other patriarchs, provoking their resistance. For example, in 431 Patriarch Cyril of Alexandria impeached for heresy Patriarch Nestorius of Constantinople.

Alexandria's objections to Constantinople's promotion, which led to a constant struggle between the two sees in the first half of the 5th century, were supported by Rome, which proposed the theory that the most important sees were the three Petrine ones, of Rome, Antioch, and Alexandria, with Rome in the first place.

However, the power of the patriarch of Constantinople continued to grow. Eastern Orthodox state that the 28th canon of the Council of Chalcedon (451) explicitly proclaimed the equality of the Bishops of Rome and Constantinople, and that it established the highest court of ecclesiastical appeal in Constantinople. The patriarch of the imperial capital succeeded in his efforts to become the leading bishop in the Byzantine Empire: he "headed a vast curia and other bishops who resided in Constantinople constituted a permanent synod, which became the real governing body of the church".

Patriarch John IV of Constantinople, who died in 595, assumed the title of "Ecumenical Patriarch".

The idea that with the transfer of the imperial capital from Rome to Constantinople, primacy in the church was also transferred, is found in undeveloped form as early as John Philoponus (c. 490 – c. 570). It was enunciated in its most advanced form by Photios I of Constantinople (c. 810 – c. 893). Constantinople, as the seat of the ruler of the empire and therefore of the world, was the highest among the patriarchates and, like the emperor, had the right to govern them.

=== Council of Nicaea (325) ===
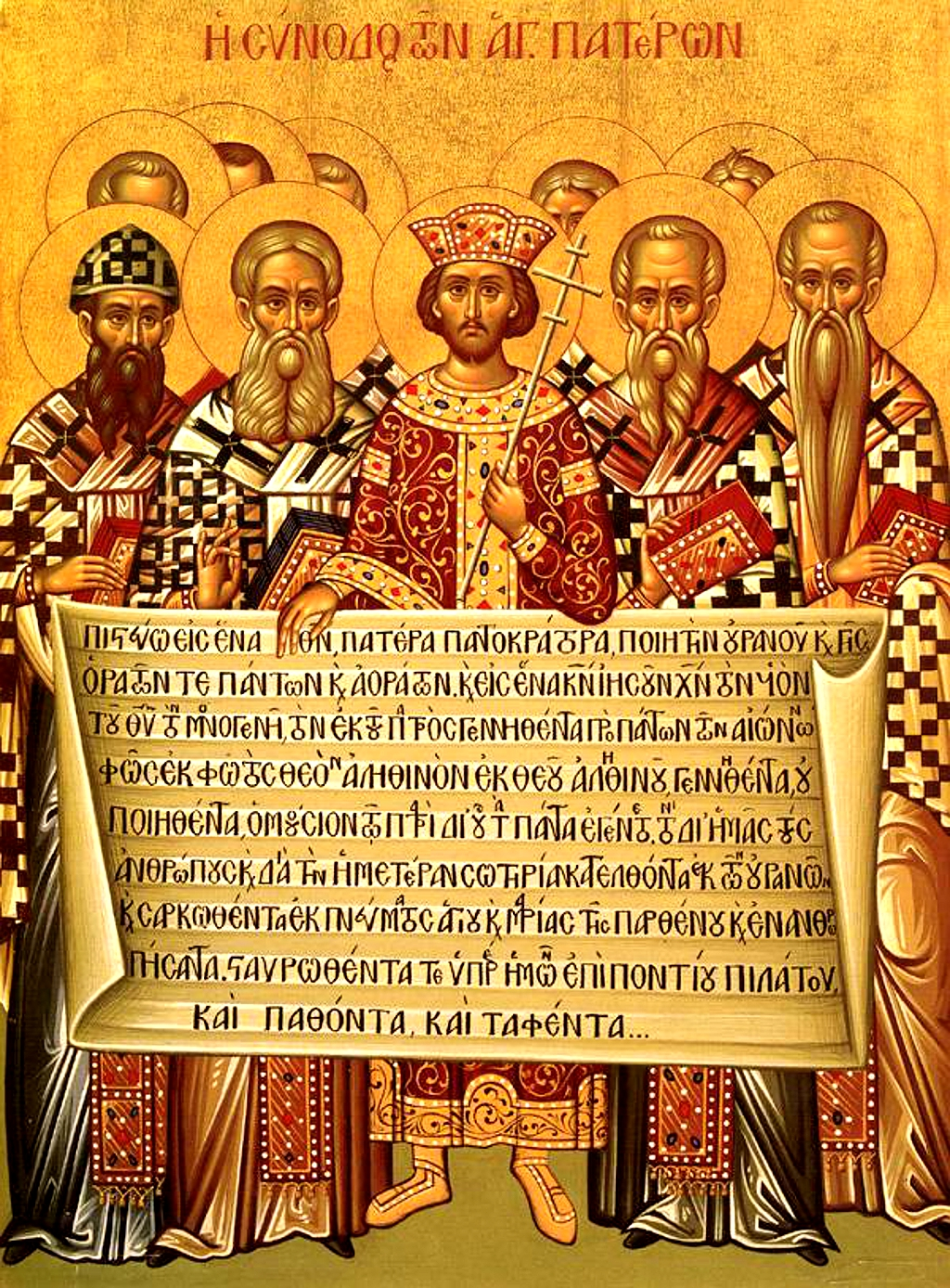
Icon depicting the Emperor Constantine (centre) and the bishops of the First Council of Nicaea (325) holding the Niceno–Constantinopolitan Creed of 381

After the Roman Emperor Constantine the Great legalized Christianity (with the Edict of Milan), he summoned the First Ecumenical Council at Nicaea in 325. The bishops at the council confirmed the position of the metropolitan sees of Rome and Alexandria as having authority outside their own province, and also the existing privileges of the churches in Antioch and the other provinces. These sees were later called Patriarchates. These were given an order of precedence: Rome, as the capital of the empire, was naturally given first place, then came Alexandria and Antioch. In a separate canon the council also approved the special honor given to Jerusalem over other sees subject to the same metropolitan.

=== First Council of Constantinople (381) ===
Emperor Theodosius I convened the second ecumenical council (Constantinople I) at the imperial capital city in 381. The council elevated the see of Constantinople to a position ahead of the other chief metropolitan sees, except that of Rome, thus raising it above the sees of Alexandria and Antioch. (Note: Following the establishment of Constantinople (the ancient city of Byzantium) as the state capital of the Roman Empire in the early part of the 4th century, a series of significant ecclesiastical events saw the status of the Bishop of New Rome (as Constantinople was then called) elevated to its current position and privilege.) This action has been described as sowing the seed for the ecclesiastical rivalry between Constantinople and Rome which was ultimately a factor leading to the schism between East and West.

It demarcated the territory within the praetorian prefecture of the East into five canonical territories corresponding to the five civil dioceses: Diocese of Egypt (metropolis in Alexandria), Diocese of the East (metropolis in Antioch), Diocese of Asia (Metropolis of Ephesus), Diocese of Pontus (metropolis in Caesarea Cappadociae), and Diocese of Thrace (metropolis in Heraclea, later under Constantinople); The council mentioned the churches in the civil dioceses of Asia, Pontus, and Thrace, decreeing that the synod of each province should manage the ecclesiastical affairs of that province alone, except for the privileges already recognized for the sees of Alexandria and Antioch.

Generally, no Western bishops attended the council, though Ascholius of Thessalonica (a city under Roman jurisdiction at that time) did attend and was tasked by Pope Damasus to "insure that an utterly blameless bishop" be elected for Constantinople. The Latin Church appears to have initially accepted the canons of this council as evidenced to one of them being cited by a Roman legate during the Council of Chalcedon and all extant sources include these canons.

=== Chalcedon (451) ===
Rome's Tome of Leo (449) was highly regarded and formed the basis for the Council of Chalcedon formulation. But it was not universally accepted and was even called "impious" and "blasphemous" by those who condemned the council that approved and accepted it. The next ecumenical council corrected a possible imbalance in Pope Leo's presentation. Although the Bishop of Rome was well respected even at this early date, the East holds that the concept of the primacy of the Roman See and Papal Infallibility were only developed much later.

The disputed canon 28 of the Council of Chalcedon in 451, confirming the authority already held by Constantinople, granted its archbishop jurisdiction over Pontus and Thrace.

The council also ratified an agreement between Antioch and Jerusalem, whereby Jerusalem held jurisdiction over three provinces, numbering it among the five great sees. As thus interpreted, there were now five patriarchs presiding over the church within the Byzantine Empire, in the following order of precedence: the Patriarch of Rome, the Patriarch of Constantinople, the Patriarch of Alexandria, the Patriarch of Antioch, and the Patriarch of Jerusalem.

Although Leo I, whose delegates were absent when this resolution was passed, recognized the council as ecumenical and confirmed its doctrinal decrees, he rejected its canon 28 on the ground that it contravened the sixth canon of Nicaea and infringed the rights of Alexandria and Antioch.

This canon would remain a constant source of friction between East and West until the mutual excommunications of 1054 made it irrelevant in that regard; but controversy about its applicability to the authority of the patriarchate of Constantinople still continues.

The same disputed canon also recognized the authority of Constantinople over bishops of dioceses "among the barbarians", which has been variously interpreted as referring either to all areas outside the Byzantine Empire or only to those in the vicinity of Pontus, Asia and Thrace or to non-Greeks within the empire.

Canon 9 of the council also declared: "If a bishop or clergyman should have a difference with the metropolitan of the province, let him have recourse to the Exarch of the Diocese, or to the throne of the Imperial City of Constantinople, and there let it be tried." This has been interpreted as conferring on the see of Constantinople a greater privilege than what any council ever gave Rome, or as of much lesser significance than that.

=== Separation of the West from the Roman Empire ===
In 476, the Osthrogoth leader Odoacer deposed Romulus Augustulus, emperor of the western part of the Roman Empire, ending the line of emperors in Rome. Odoacer sent western imperial insignia were sent to the eastern emperor Zeno in Constantinople, and called himself as Zeno's vassal. Odoacer was soon replaced by Theodoric. Being an Arian like other Christian Goths, Theodoric ended ecclesiastical ties with Constaninople, which was committed to establiahing Nicene Christianity. This was the first separation of Rome from Constantinople. In the opinion of Randall R. Cloud, the permanent separation of the Greek East from the Latin West was "the fundamental reason for the estrangement that soon followed between the Greek and the Latin Christians".

The dominant language of the West was Latin, while that of the East was Greek. Soon after the fall of the West to invaders, the number of individuals who spoke both languages dwindled, and communication between East and West grew much more difficult. With linguistic unity gone, cultural unity began to crumble as well. The two halves of the church were naturally divided along similar lines; they developed different rites and had different approaches to religious doctrines. Although the schism was still centuries away, its outlines were already perceptible.

After a lengthy war, Rome was reconquered by the Byzantine army under Justinian I. In the areas under his control, Justinian I established the doctrine of symphonia (also called caesaropapism) as the constitution of the church in a scheme according to which the emperor "had the right and duty of regulating by his laws the minutest detail of worship and discipline, and also of dictating the theological opinions to be held in the Church". According to the Westminster Dictionary of Theological Terms, this caesaropapism was "a source of contention between Rome and Constantinople that led to the schism of 1054". Justinian deposed the pro-Gothic Pope Silverius, caused a schism within the Latin Church due to the Three Chapters Controversy (resulting in the creation of the Patriarchate of Aquileia) During the period called the Byzantine Papacy, this applied to the bishops of Rome, most of whom were of Greek or Syrian origin. Explicit approval of the emperor in Constantinople was required for consecration of bishops within the empire. Previously the newly appointed Popes used to travel to Constantinople to ratify their appointment by the Emperor, but later this work was alloted to the Exarch of Ravenna. Resentment in the West against the Byzantine emperor's governance of the church is shown as far back as the 6th century, when "the tolerance of the Arian Gothic kings was preferred to the caesaropapist claims of Constantinople". The origins of the distinct attitudes in West and East are sometimes traced back even to Augustine of Hippo, who "saw the relationship between church and state as one of tension between the 'city of God' and the 'city of the world'", and Eusebius, who "saw the state as the protector of the church and the emperor as God's vicar on earth".

=== Decline of three patriarchates ===
By 661, Muslim Arabs had taken over the territories assigned to the patriarchates of Alexandria, Antioch and Jerusalem, which thereafter were never more than partially and temporarily recovered. In 732, Emperor Leo III the Isaurian, in revenge for the opposition of Pope Gregory III to the emperor's iconoclast policies, transferred Sicily, Calabria and Illyria from the patriarchate of Rome (whose jurisdiction until then extended as far east as Thessalonica) to that of Constantinople. The Constantinople Patriarchate, after expanding eastward at the time of the Council of Chalcedon to take in Pontus and the Roman province of Asia, which at that time were still under the emperor's control, thus expanded equally to the west and was practically coextensive with the Byzantine Empire.

=== Council in Trullo (Quinisext, 692) ===
The West's rejection of the Quinisext Council of 692 led to pressure from the Byzantine Empire on the West to reject multiple Latin rite customs as non-Orthodox. The Latin practices that had got the attention of the other Patriarchates and that had been condemned by this Council included the practice of celebrating Mass on weekdays in Lent (rather than having Pre-Sanctified Liturgies); fasting on Saturdays throughout the year; omitting the "Alleluia" in Lent; depicting Christ as a lamb; and using unleavened bread.

Larger disputes were revealed regarding Eastern and Western attitudes toward celibacy for priests and deacons, with the Council affirming the right of married men to become priests (though forbidding priests to marry and forbidding bishops to live with their wives) and prescribing deposition for anyone who attempted to separate a clergyman other than a bishop from his wife, or for any cleric other than a bishop who dismissed his wife.

Pope Sergius I, who was of Syrian ancestry, rejected the council. Emperor Justinian II ordered his arrest, but this was thwarted.

In 694, in Visigothic Spain, the council was ratified by the Eighteenth Council of Toledo at the urging of the king, Wittiza. Fruela I of Asturias reversed the decision of Toledo sometime during his reign (757–768).

=== Papal supremacy and Pentarchy ===
The primary causes of the schism were disputes over conflicting claims of jurisdiction, in particular over papal authority—Pope Leo IX claimed he held authority over the four Eastern patriarchs—and over the insertion of the Filioque clause into the Nicene Creed by the Western patriarch in 1014. Eastern Orthodox today state that Council of Chalcedon canon 28 explicitly proclaimed the equality of the Bishops of Rome and Constantinople and that it established the highest court of ecclesiastical appeal in Constantinople. Council of Ephesus canon 7 declared:

It is unlawful for any man to bring forward, or to write, or to compose a different (ἑτέραν) Faith as a rival to that established by the holy Fathers assembled with the Holy Ghost in Nicæa. But those who shall dare to compose a different faith, or to introduce or offer it to persons desiring to turn to the acknowledgment of the truth, whether from Heathenism or from Judaism, or from any heresy whatsoever, shall be deposed, if they be bishops or clergymen; bishops from the episcopate and clergymen from the clergy; and if they be laymen, they shall be anathematized

— Schaff 1916, p. 197, Ch. IV The Council of Ephesus, Session I Extracts from the Acts

Eastern Orthodox today state that this canon of the Council of Ephesus explicitly prohibited modification of the Nicene Creed drawn up by the first Ecumenical Council in 325, the wording of which, it is claimed, but not the substance, had been modified by the second Ecumenical Council, making additions such as "who proceeds from the Father".

Eastern Orthodox argue that the First Council of Ephesus canon 7 explicitly prohibited modification of the Nicene Creed by any man (not by ecumenical church council) drawn up by the first Ecumenical Council in 325. In reality, the council made no exception for an ecumenical council or any other body of bishops, and the Greeks participating in the Council of Florence emphatically denied that even an ecumenical council had the power to add anything to the creed.

The creed quoted in the Acts of the Council of Ephesus of 431 (the third ecumenical council) is that of the first ecumenical council without the modifications that the second ecumenical council, held in Constantinople in 381, is understood to have made to it, such as the addition of "who proceeds from the Father". Eastern Orthodox theologians state this change of the wording of the churches' original creed was done to address various teachings outside of the church—specifically, that of Macedonius I of Constantinople, which the council claimed was a distortion of the church's teaching on the Holy Spirit. This was not a change of the orthodoxy of the churches' original creed.

Thus the word ἑτέραν in the seventh canon of the later Council of Ephesus is understood as meaning "different" or "contradictory" and not "another" in the sense of mere explanatory additions to the already existing creed. Some scholars hold that the additions attributed to the First Council of Constantinople were adopted only with the 451 Council of Chalcedon, 20 years after that of Ephesus, and even that the Council of Ephesus, in which Alexandrian influence was dominant, was by this canon excluding the Constantinopolitan Creed, which eventually annexed the name and fame of the creed adopted at Nicaea.

=== Filioque and primacy issues (867–879) ===
Three councils were held, two by Constantinople, one by Rome over the validity of the deposition of Patriarch Ignatios of Constantinople. The council convened in 869 at Constantinople deposed Ignatios' successor Photius, who also happened to be a vehement critic of papal supremacy and insertion of the filioque into the Nicene Creed by the Latins, (which initially began in Visigothic Spain by the Third Council of Toledo, then adopted in the England at the Council of Hatfield and institutionalised in the Frankish Empire by Council of Frankfurt) as his politically motivated appointment withput episcopal consecration by Emperor Michael III was deemed uncanonical. This was ratified by a council held in Rome by Pope Nicholas I. But after the death of Ignatios, the Orthodox brought Photius back, denounced the replacement and excommunicated the now dead Pope Nicholas I in their own council held in 879. This council also denounced the pope's attempt to control affairs outside the purview of his own canonical territory (which occurred in the context of disputes over the status of the newly Christianised Bulgaria as Bulgarian Tsar Boris I played Rome and Constantinople against each other in his attempt to obtain an autocephalous Patriachate for his kingdom) and denounced the addition of filioque as a heresy (in sharp contrast to the interpretation of the same that had been put forward by Maximus the Confessor). The schism with Rome was mended when Photius was deposed by Emperor Basil I. Each church recognizes its own council(s) as legitimate and does not recognize the other's council(s).

=== Mutual excommunication of 1054 ===
Changes in the extent of the Empire ruled from Constantinople. 476 End of the Western Empire; 550 Conquests of Justinian I; 717 Accession of Leo the Isaurian; 867 Accession of Basil I; 1025 Death of Basil II; 1095 Eve of the First Crusade; 1170 Under Manuel I; 1270 Under Michael VIII Palaiologos; 1400 Before the fall of Constantinople

In 1053, Leo of Ohrid, at the instigation, according to J. B. Bury, of Patriarch Michael Cerularius of Constantinople, wrote to Bishop John of Trani a letter, intended for all the Latin bishops, including the pope, in which he attacked Western practices such as using unleavened bread for the Eucharist, and fasting rules that differed from those in Constantinople, while Cerularius himself closed all Latin churches in Constantinople.

In response, Leo IX wrote the letter In terra pax of 2 September 1053, addressed to Cerularius and Leo of Ohrid, in which he speaks at length of the privileges granted through Peter to the see of Rome. In one of the 41 sections of his letter he also speaks of privileges granted by the emperors, quoting from the Donation of Constantine document, which he believed to be genuine (section 20). Some scholars say that this letter was never actually dispatched, but was set aside and that the papal reply actually sent was the softer but still harsh letter Scripta tuae of January 1054.

The advance of the Norman conquest of southern Italy constituted a threat to the possessions of both the Byzantine Empire and the papacy, each of which sought the support of the other. Accordingly, conciliatory letters, the texts of which have not been preserved, were written to the pope by the emperor and Cerularius. In his January 1054 reply to the emperor, Quantas gratias, Leo IX asked for his assistance against the Normans and complained of what the pope saw as Caerularius's arrogance. In his reply to Caerularius, he upbraided the patriarch for trying to subject the patriarchs of Alexandria and Antioch to himself and for adopting the title of Ecumenical Patriarch and insisted on the primacy of the see of Rome.

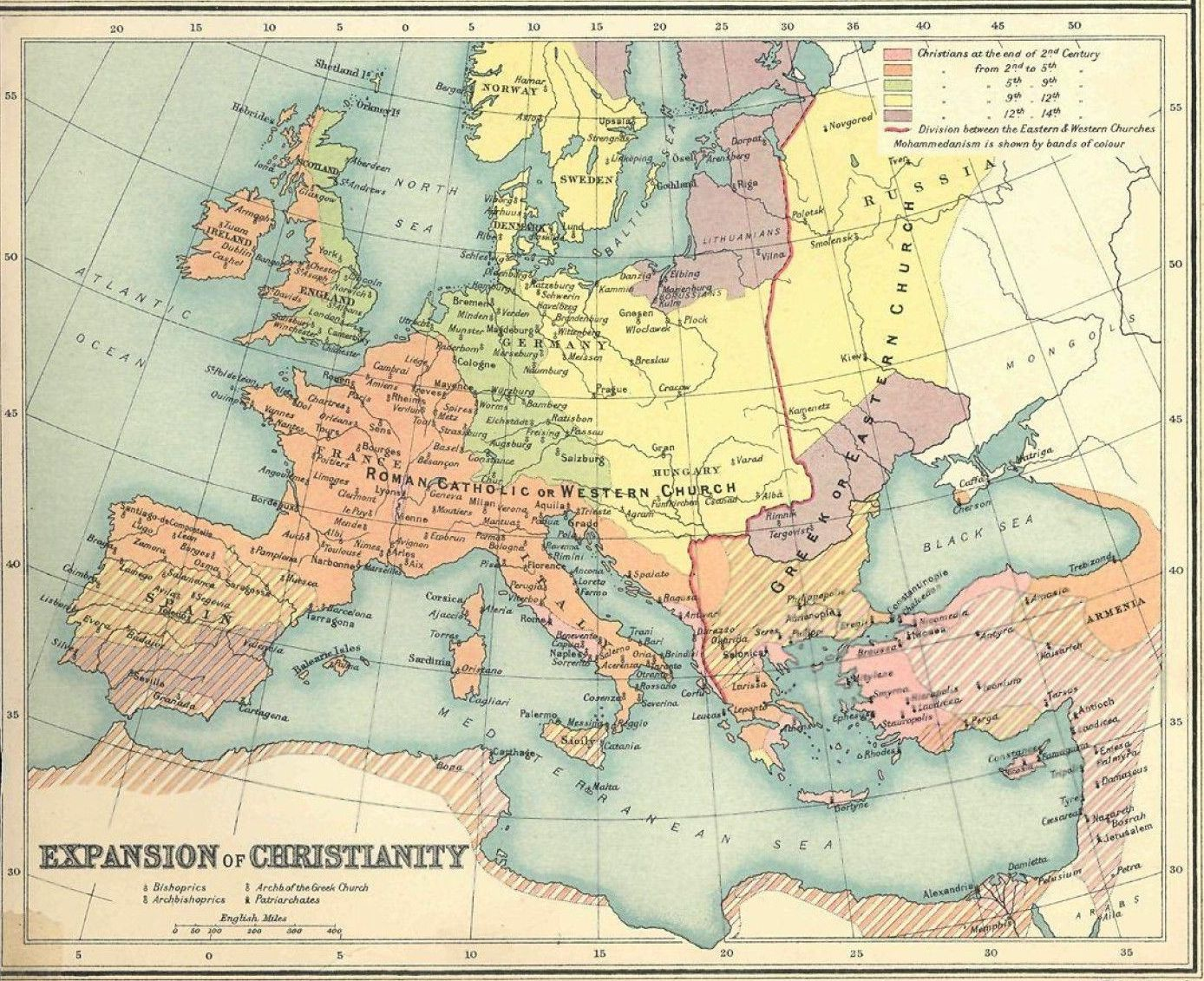
The division between the Eastern and Western Churches

These two letters were entrusted to a delegation of three legates, headed by the undiplomatic cardinal Humbert of Silva Candida, and also including Frederick of Lorraine, who was papal secretary and Cardinal-Deacon of Santa Maria in Domnica, and Peter, Archbishop of Amalfi. They were given friendship and support by the emperor but were spurned by the patriarch. On 16 July 1054, three months after Pope Leo's death in April 1054 and nine months before the next pope took office, they laid on the altar of Hagia Sophia, which was prepared for the celebration of the Divine Liturgy, a bull of excommunication of Cerularius and his supporters. At a synod held on 20 July 1054, Cerularius in turn excommunicated the legates.

=== East and West since 1054 ===
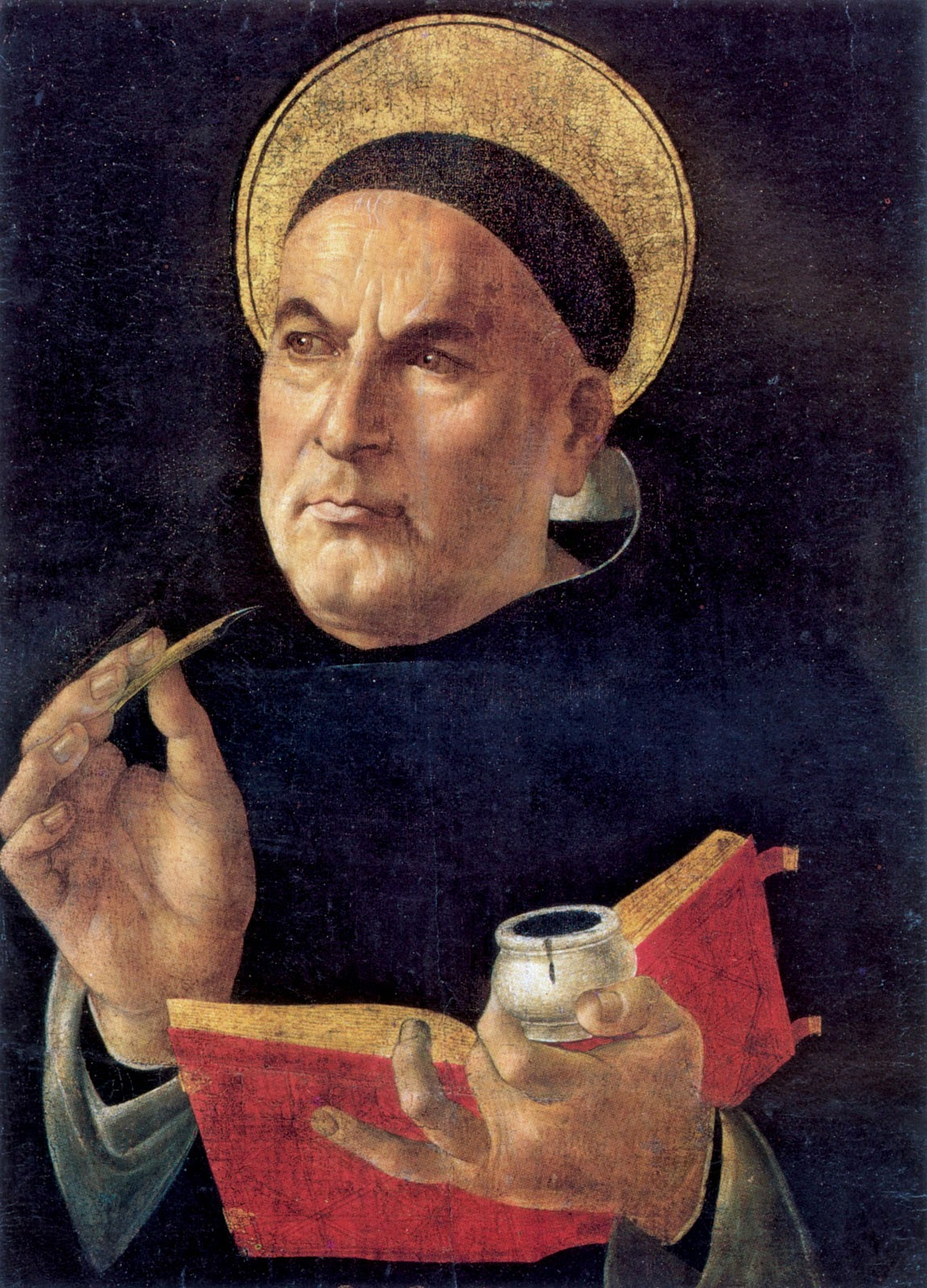
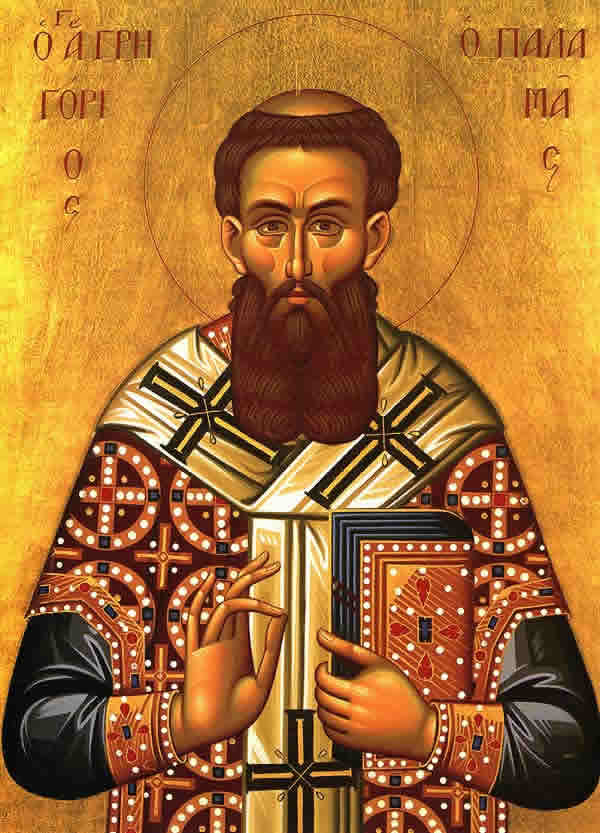
After the Great Schism of 1054, Roman Catholicism and Eastern Orthodoxy continued to move further away theologically. Scholasticism, reaching its peak under Thomas Aquinas (left) was adopted by the Roman Catholic Church as its main doctrine, whereas hesychasm, famously defended by Gregory Palamas (right) was made central to its doctrine. Thomism's divine simplicity stands in direct opposition to Palamite essence-energy distinction. Canonization of Thomas Aquinas was counteracted with his condemnation at the Hesychast councils, which canonised Palamas in response, thereby solidifying the schism.

There was no single event that marked the breakdown. Rather, the two churches slid into and out of schism over a period of several centuries, punctuated with temporary reconciliations. Efforts were made in subsequent centuries by emperors, popes and patriarchs to heal the rift between the churches. However, a number of factors and historical events worked to widen the separation over time. It is estimated that in 1054, a slim majority of Christians worldwide were Eastern Christians; most of the rest were Western Christians. Few of these would have noticed any difference as noted by Timothy Ware: "Even after 1054 friendly relations between East and West continued. The two parts of Christendom were not yet conscious of a great gulf of separation between them. ... The dispute remained something of which ordinary Christians in East and West were largely unaware".

At the time of the excommunications, many contemporary historians, including Byzantine chroniclers, did not consider the event significant. Relations continued as usual, for instance endownments made towards churches in the East such as the Holy Sepulchre were kept in place and Pope Gregory VII confirmed the proprietorship of the Patriarch of Jerusalem over a church in Le Marche in the Pyrenees.

When Emperor Alexios Komnenos asked in the 1080s whether a canonical decision had been made to break relations with Rome, the participants of the synod of Constantinople said no. Interactions in the 12th century between the Latin crusaders and the indigenous population show that rather than the former considering the latter as heretics or schismatics, they incorporated local hierarchies into their own. However, the Catholics were aware that there were in scishm with Constantinople, as evidenced by their creation of Latin Patriarchates of Jerusalem and Antioch in opposition to the Greek Patriachates and expulsion of the Greek patriarch John the Oxite from Antioch. The Greek Patriarchs remained exiled out of their sees in the Outremer and operated from Constantinople until they were reconqured by Muslim forces.

=== Sectarian tensions in the Byzantine Empire in the 11th–12th centuries ===
Starting from the late 11th century, the dependency of the Byzantine Empire on the navies of the Republic of Venice and, to a lesser extent, the Republic of Genoa and the Republic of Pisa, led to the predominance of Catholic merchants in Byzantium—which had received major trading concessions since the 1080s—subsequently causing economic and social upheaval. Together with the perceived arrogance of the Italians, it fueled popular resentment amongst the middle and lower classes both in the countryside and in the cities.

By the second half of the 12th century, the practically uncontrollable rivalry among competitors from the different city-states devolved to the point that Italians were raiding the quarters of other Italians in the capital, and retaliatory draconian measures by the Byzantine authorities led to the deterioration of inter-religious relations in the city.

When in 1182 the regency of the empress mother, Maria of Antioch, an ethnic French from the Crusader Principality of Antioch notorious for the favouritism shown to Latin merchants and the big aristocratic land-owners, was deposed by Andronikos I Komnenos in the wake of popular support, the new emperor allowed mobs to massacre the hated foreigners. Henceforth Byzantine foreign policy was invariably perceived as sinister and anti-Latin in the West. Byzantine theologian Theodore Balsamon wrote in 1190 that no Latin should be given sacraments unless he first declares that he will abstain from Latin dogmas and customs and conform to Eastern practices. He was still criticized for excessive harshness by contemporaries such as Archbishop Demetrios Chomatenos, who pointed out that Latins had not been condemned as heretics and were not in complete schism, although he did not state whether Latins should be given Communion or vice versa.

=== Fourth Crusade (1204) and other military conflicts ===
Latin crusaders and Venetian merchants sacked Constantinople itself (1204), looting the Church of Holy Wisdom and various other Orthodox holy sites, and converting them to Latin Catholic worship. The Norman Crusaders also destroyed the Imperial Library of Constantinople.

Various holy artifacts from these Orthodox holy places were taken to the West. The crusaders also appointed a Latin Patriarch of Constantinople. The conquest of Constantinople and the final treaty established the Latin Empire of the East and the Latin Patriarch of Constantinople, with various other Crusader states. Later some religious artifacts were sold in Europe to finance or fund the Latin Empire in Byzantium – as when Emperor Baldwin II of Constantinople (r. 1228–1261) sold the relic of the Crown of Thorns while in France trying to raise new funds to maintain his hold on Byzantium.

In 1261, the Byzantine emperor, Michael VIII Palaiologos brought the Latin Empire to an end. However, the Western attack on the heart of the Byzantine Empire is seen as a factor that led eventually to its conquest by Ottoman Muslims in the 15th century. Some scholars believe that the 1204 sacking of Constantinople contributed more to the schism than the events of 1054.

In Northern Europe, the Teutonic Knights, after their 12th- and 13th-century successes in the Northern Crusades, attempted (1240) to conquer the Eastern Orthodox Russian Republics of Pskov and Novgorod, an enterprise somewhat endorsed by Pope Gregory IX (r. 1227–1241). One of the major defeats the Teutonic Knights suffered was the Battle of the Ice in 1242. Catholic Sweden also undertook several campaigns against Orthodox Novgorod. There were also conflicts between Catholic Poland and Orthodox Russia, which helped solidify the schism between East and West.

=== Second Council of Lyon (1272) ===
The Second Council of Lyon was convoked to act on a pledge by Michael VIII to reunite the Eastern church with the West. Wishing to end the Great Schism that divided Rome and Constantinople, Gregory X had sent an embassy to Michael VIII, who had reconquered Constantinople, putting an end to the remnants of the Latin Empire in the East, and he asked Latin despots in the East to curb their ambitions.

On 29 June (the Feast of Saints Peter and Paul, a patronal feast of the Popes), Gregory X celebrated a Mass in St John's Church, where both sides took part. The council declared that the Roman church possessed "the supreme and full primacy and authority over the universal Catholic Church."

The union effected was "a sham and a political gambit", a fiction maintained by the emperor to prevent westerners from recovering the city of Constantinople, which they had lost just over a decade before, in 1261. It was fiercely opposed by clergy and people and never put into effect, in spite of a sustained campaign by Patriarch John XI of Constantinople (John Bekkos), a convert to the cause of union, to defend the union intellectually, and vigorous and brutal repression of opponents by Michael.

In 1278, Pope Nicholas III, learning of the fictitious character of Greek conformity, sent legates to Constantinople, demanding the personal submission of every Orthodox cleric and adoption of the Filioque, as already the Greek delegates at Lyon had been required to recite the Creed with the inclusion of Filioque and to repeat it two more times.

Emperor Michael's attempts to resolve the schism ended when Pope Martin IV, seeing that the union was only a sham, excommunicated Michael VIII in 1281 in support of Charles of Anjou's attempts to mount a new campaign to retake the Eastern Roman provinces lost to Michael. Michael VIII's son and successor Andronicus II repudiated the union at the Council of Blacharnae, and Bekkos was forced to abdicate, being eventually exiled and imprisoned until his death in 1297.

=== Hesychasm and Fifth Council of Constantinople ===
The Hesychast controversy began in the 1340s as a private dispute between the Italian Greek monk Barlaam of Calabria, a faculty of the University of Constantinople and the bishop of Thessalonica Gregory Palamas, over the legitimacy of hesychasm but snowballed into a larger controversy which pitted the Latin doctrines centered around Augustinian teachings and Thomist Aristotelianism against Greek patristic doctrine based on the Neoplatonist works of the Cappadocian Fathers. Barlaam asserted that God is ultimately unknowable to humanity but can be logically inferred to using Scholasticism & attacked the notion of humans obtaining theosis through the practice of hesychasm as a form of Bogomilism and Messalianism in his treatise Against the Messalians. Palamas in return, accessed Barlaam's assertions as being agnostic, accused him of placing more trust in the works of virtuous pagan philosophers over the methodologies of the Church Fathers and formulated the essence-energies distinction in his works like the Triads, under which humanity can achieve theosis with God's energies through theoria while God's essence remaining unknowable. Palamite teachings on the essence-energies distinction provided the strongest doctrinal backbone for the rejection of filioque since the denunciation of the same by Photius (as Palamas explained that the Holy Spirit proceeded from the Son energetically and not hypostatically as implied by the filioque) and were in line with a series of highly-esteemed Greek mystical writings circulated within the Byzantine monastic community (later codified in the form of Philokalia), thus it attracted widespread support amongst the Byzantine clergy. Barlaam and his supporters like Gregory Akindynos, Matthew of Ephesus, Nikephoros Gregoras and Prochoros Kydones were condemned heretics at the Fifth Council of Constantinople, as Palamism was found to be line with works of Pseudo-Dionysious, and Palamite clergymen like Isidore Buchiras and Philotheos Kokkinos were promoted to the position of Patriarch of Constantinople. Barlaam and his supporters would end converting into Catholicism. The Catholics found the essence-energies distinction as being fundamentally opposed to the concept of divine simplicity as propounded by Thomas Aquinas and hesychasm was interpreted as (what would be later called) quietism ('Quietism' being a literal translation of the Greek hesychasm).

The Hesychasm controversy occurred in midst of the Byzantine civil war of 1341-47, with the pro-hesychasts supporting John VI Kantakouzene against the anti-hesychast figures like Patriarch John Kalekas. Kalekas' supporter, the Italian-born dowager empress Anna of Savoy, working to secure the regency of her son John V, attracted xenophobic sentiment similar to that shown towards Maria of Antioch due to the lingering resentment against Frankokratia (where Latin Catholic entities like the House of Flanders, House of Courtenay, Orsini family, Catalan Company etc colonised parts of Greece, the most notable cases being Catalan vandalism at Mount Athos and Venetian colonisation of Crete, Cyprus and Ionian islands) and the conversion of anti-Palamites into Roman Catholicism, in midst of the intense socio-religious polarisation of the times, made support to Palamas synonymous to expression of anti-Catholic sentiment. The Fifth Council of Constantinople joined the list of councils like the Fourth Council of Constantinople and Quinisext Council that recognised by Eastern Orthodoxy as ecumenical but not so by the Catholic Church.

=== Council of Ferrara–Florence (1439) ===
In the 15th century, the eastern emperor John VIII Palaiologos, pressed hard by the Ottoman Turks, was keen to ally himself with the West, and to do so he arranged with Pope Eugene IV for discussions about the reunion to be held again, this time at the Council of Ferrara-Florence. After several long discussions, the emperor managed to convince the Eastern representatives to accept the Western doctrines of Filioque, Purgatory and the supremacy of the Papacy. On 6 June 1439, an agreement was signed by all the Eastern bishops present but one, the pro-Palamite legate Mark of Ephesus, who held that Rome continued in both heresy and schism. Mark utilised Palamism as the main doctrinal difference to argue against union with Rome.

It seemed that the Great Schism had been ended. Upon their return, the Eastern bishops found their agreement with the West broadly rejected by the populace and by civil authorities, with the notable exception of the Emperors of the East who remained committed to union until the fall of Constantinople two decades later. The union signed at Florence has never been accepted by the Eastern churches.

=== Fall of Constantinople (1453) and thereafter ===
At the time of the fall of Constantinople to the invading Ottoman Empire in May 1453, Orthodox Christianity was already entrenched in Russia, whose political and de facto religious centre had shifted from Kiev to Moscow. The Russian Orthodox Church, had previously declared its autocephaly from the Patriarchate of Constantinople in protest of the Union of Florence. With the subjugation of the Byzantine, Bulgarian and Serbian realms by the Ottomans, Russian political and ecclesiastical elite came to view Moscow as the Third Rome.

Under Ottoman rule, the Orthodox Church acquired the status of an autonomous millet, specifically the Rum Millet. The Ecumenical Patriarch became the ruler (millet başı) of all the Eastern Orthodox Christian subjects of the empire, including Serbians, Bulgarians and Romanians. Upon conquering Constantinople, Mehmed II assumed the legal function of the Byzantine emperors and appointed the anti-Catholic Palamite monk Gennadius Scholarius as the new Patriarch of Constantinople. The sultans enhanced the temporal powers of the Greek orthodox hierarchy that came to be politically beholden solely to the Ottoman sultan and, along with other Ottoman Greek nobles, came to run the Balkan Orthodox domains of the Ottoman Empire.

Russia bolstered its claims of being the successor of the Byzantine Empire by raising itself from a Grand Principality to Tsardom, and engaging in wars of expansion against Islamic polities of Central Asia, in addition to wars against Poland-Lithuania aimed at reconquering the territories of the Eastern Orthodox polity of Kievan Rus that had fallen under Lithuanian control following the Mongol conquest and wars against Iran (in the manner of the Byzantine-Sasanid wars), ultimately confronting the Ottomans themselves. In 1589 that the Metropolitan Bishop of Moscow was raised to the position of Patriarch by the Patriarch of Constantinople. In Russia, the anti-Catholic sentiments came to be entrenched by the Polish intervention during the Time of Troubles in the early 17th century, which was seen as an attempt by Poland to convert the Tsardom of Russia to Catholicism by installing the Polish king Wladyslaw IV as the Tsar of Moscow. Wladyslaw's father Sigismumd III, a fanatical Catholic committed to the Counter-Reformation, actively persecuted Orthodox clergy in his territory, forcing the Orthodox clergy to unite with Rome, thereby creating the Ukrainian Greek Catholic Church and Belarusian Greek Catholic Church. Wladyslaw IV killed the Patriarch Hermogenes of Moscow in his attempt to forcefully impose Catholicism in Russia but that attempt failed as the Russians allied behind Mikhail Romanov, son of the new Patriarch Filaret. Subjugation of the Ukrainian Orthodox population by the Polish Catholics would later result in the Khmelnytsky Uprising.

By the late 17th century, when the Hapsburgs began to conquer Hungary from the Ottomans following the failed siege of Vienna, efforts were made to convert the Orthodox population largely concentrated in the borders with Poland and the provinces of Transylvania and Vojvodina into Catholicism, leading to the creation of the Romanian Greek Catholic Church, Slovak Greek Catholic Church, Ruthenian Greek Catholic Church and the Eparchy of Marča (which ultimately became the Greek Catholic Church of Croatia and Serbia).

The capitulation of the Ottoman Empire, in the late 17th century in response to the changing tides of the Ottoman-Hapsburg wars and conflicts with Russia, saw the incursion of Catholic missionaries under the support of the French state. As Ottoman law restricted these Catholics from evangelising among Muslims (see Apostacy in Islam), the Eastern Orthodox became the main target for Catholic missionary activities, resulting in creation of Albanian Greek Catholic Church. In mainland Italy, many Albanian adherents of Eastern Orthodoxy fleeing Ottoman persecution joined into the Italo-Albanian Catholic Church. The Status Quo formulated by the Sublime Porte formally alloted the Francisan missionaries shares in sites like the Church of the Holy Sepulchre and Church of the Nativity that had been traditionally administered by the Greek Orthodox Patriarchs of Jerusalem. 2 Greek Orthodox Patriarchs of Antioch - Cyril V Zaim and Athanasius III Dabbas, under the influence of Franciscan preachers, had entered into communion with Rome while maintaining the same with Constantinople. This ultimately resulted in the creation of the Melkite Greek Catholic Church by Cyril VI Tanas in 1724. The final separation between the Catholic Church and the Eastern Orthodox Churches came in the 18th century. In 1729, the Roman Church under Pope Benedict XIII prohibited communion with Orthodox Churches. In 1755, the patriarchs of Alexandria, Jerusalem and Constantinople in retaliation declared the final interruption of sacral communion with the Roman Church and declared Catholicism heretical.

In the 19th century, missionary efforts on part of the Catholic Church to convert the Eastern Orthodox intensified as the Ottoman Empire continued to decline. The Bulgarian Greek Catholic Church was established in 1861 in response to growth of Bulgarian nationalism fueling resentment against Greek ecclesiastical dominance. The Latin Patriarchate of Jerusalem, which had been expelled from the city by the fall of Jerusalem, was reestablished in 1847. The early 1900s saw the creation of the Greek Byzantine Catholic Church and Russian Greek Catholic Church in an attempt to convert the 2 main Eastern Orthodox nationalities.

The discord between Eastern Orthodoxy and Roman Catholicism has translated into the open hostility among various Slavic countries, prominent being that of Poland and Russia and Croatia and Serbia. Nationalistic policies like Russification, pan-Slavism and Polonisation are heavily motivated by the Catholic-Orthodox divide.

=== First Vatican Council (1870) ===
The doctrine of papal primacy was further developed at the First Vatican Council, which declared that "in the disposition of God the Roman church holds the preeminence of ordinary power over all the other churches". This council also affirmed the dogma of papal infallibility, declaring that the infallibility of the Christian community extends to the pope himself when he defines a doctrine concerning faith or morals to be held by the whole church. This new dogma, as well as the dogma of the Immaculate Conception, promulgated in Ineffabilis Deus a few years prior, are unequivocally rejected by the Eastern Church as heretical.

=== Nullification of mutual anathemas (1965) ===
A major event of the Second Vatican Council (Vatican II), was the issuance by Pope Paul VI and Orthodox Patriarch Athenagoras I of Constantinople of the Catholic–Orthodox Joint Declaration of 1965. At the same time, they lifted the mutual excommunications dating from the 11th century. The act did not result in the restoration of communion.

== Role of Byzantine-rite Eastern Catholic churches ==
The Eastern Catholic Churches, historically (and pejoratively) referred to as "Uniate" by the Orthodox, consider themselves to have reconciled the East and West Schism by having accepted the primacy of the Bishop of Rome while retaining some of the canonical rules and liturgical practices in line with the Eastern tradition such as the Byzantine Rite that is prevalent in the Orthodox Churches. Initially all Eastern Catholic Churches went through enforced Latinisation, but that was stopped in order to ease religious conversion following the incorporatation of the Melkite Greek Catholic Church and Maronite Church into Catholicism. Pope Benedict XIV had famously remarked "all may be Catholic rather than all become Latin". Latinisation was explicitly banned by Pope Leo XIII in his papal encyclical Orientale dignitatis. Byzantine-rite churches continue to enjoy significant autonomy under their own Code of Canons, retaining practices like having married clergy which aren't tolerated within the Latin rite. But some Eastern Orthodox charge that joining in this unity comes at the expense of ignoring critical doctrinal differences (like the irreconcilable differences between Palamism and Thomism) and past atrocities.

There have been periodic conflicts between the Eastern Orthodox and Eastern Catholics in Ukraine and Belarus, and later also in Transylvania. When these regions fell under Russian influence, the Russian government heavily persecuted the Eastern Catholics by dissolving the Eastern Catholic church structures (such as the Synod of Polotsk which dissolved the Ruthenian Greek Catholic Church) in name of Russification, which continued even into the Soviet Union, as the local Orthodox church hierarchy chose to cooperate with the Communist authorities, while Eastern Catholics hardened their position against Communism following the 1949 decree issued by Pope Pius XII,and thus were heavily persecuted. Since the late 1980s, the Moscow Patriarchate has criticised the methods of restoration of the "Uniate" church structures in Ukraine as well as what it called Catholic proselytism in Russia. The Moscow Patriarchate has also sought to counter Catholic proselytism within Eastern Orthodoxy theough counter-proselytism among the Catholics, especially in North America. This was initially done through the Russian Orthodox Church Outiside of Russia, leading to the creation of the Orthodox Church of America. A significant case is Alexios Toth, an Eastern Catholic who later converted to Eastern Orthodoxy, venerated as a saint within Eastern Orthodoxy for converting many Eastern Catholics back into Orthodoxy. Russian Patriarch Tikhon also formulated Western rites out of pre-schism Latin rites that are used in these Western churches. However, the OCA's autocephaly isn't recognised by Constantinople, which places American converts under the jurisdiction of Antioch. Orthodox proselytism in Poland when it fell under Russian rule led to the creation of the Polish Orthodox Church.

In 1993, a report written by the Joint International Commission for Theological Dialogue Between the Catholic Church and the Orthodox Church during its 7th plenary session at the Balamand School of Theology in Lebanon stated: (Note: The report contains unofficial suggestions of the commission, "until the competent organs of the Catholic Church and of the Orthodox Churches express their judgement in regard to it.") "Because of the way in which Catholics and Orthodox once again consider each other in their relationship to the mystery of the Church and discover each other once again as Sister Churches, this form of 'missionary apostolate' described above, and which has been called 'uniatism', can no longer be accepted either as a method to be followed nor as a model of the unity our Churches are seeking". At the same time, the document inter alia stated:

- Concerning the Oriental Catholic Churches (not to be confused with Catholic counterparts of Oriental Orthodox Churches like the Coptic Catholic Church or Syriac Catholic Church), it is clear that they, as part of the Catholic Communion, have the right to exist and to act in answer to the spiritual needs of their faithful.
- The Oriental Catholic Churches who have desired to re-establish full communion with the See of Rome and have remained faithful to it, have the rights and obligations which are connected with this communion. The principles determining their attitude towards Orthodox Churches are those which have been stated by the Second Vatican Council and have been put into practice by the Popes who have clarified the practical consequences flowing from these principles in various documents published since then. These Churches, then, should be inserted, on both local and universal levels, into the dialogue of love, in mutual respect and reciprocal trust found once again, and enter into the theological dialogue, with all its practical implications.

In February 2016, Pope Francis and Patriarch Kirill of the Russian Orthodox Church (ROC) had a meeting in Cuba and signed a joint declaration that stated inter alia: "It is our hope that our meeting may also contribute to reconciliation wherever tensions exist between Greek Catholics and Orthodox. It is today clear that the past method of 'uniatism', understood as the union of one community to the other, separating it from its Church, is not the way to re-establish unity. Nonetheless, the ecclesial communities which emerged in these historical circumstances have the right to exist and to undertake all that is necessary to meet the spiritual needs of their faithful, while seeking to live in peace with their neighbours. Orthodox and Greek Catholics are in need of reconciliation and of mutually acceptable forms of co-existence."

Meanwhile, in the interview published on the eve of the meeting in Cuba, Metropolitan Hilarion Alfeyev, the chairman of the Department of External Church Relations and a permanent member of the Holy Synod of the ROC, said that tensions between the Ukrainian Greek Catholic Church and the ROC's Ukrainian Orthodox Church had been recently heightened mainly due to the Russo-Ukrainian war. The declaration was sharply criticised by Sviatoslav Shevchuk, the Primate of the Ukrainian Greek Catholic Church, who said that his flock felt "betrayed" by the Vatican.

== Recent efforts at reconciliation ==
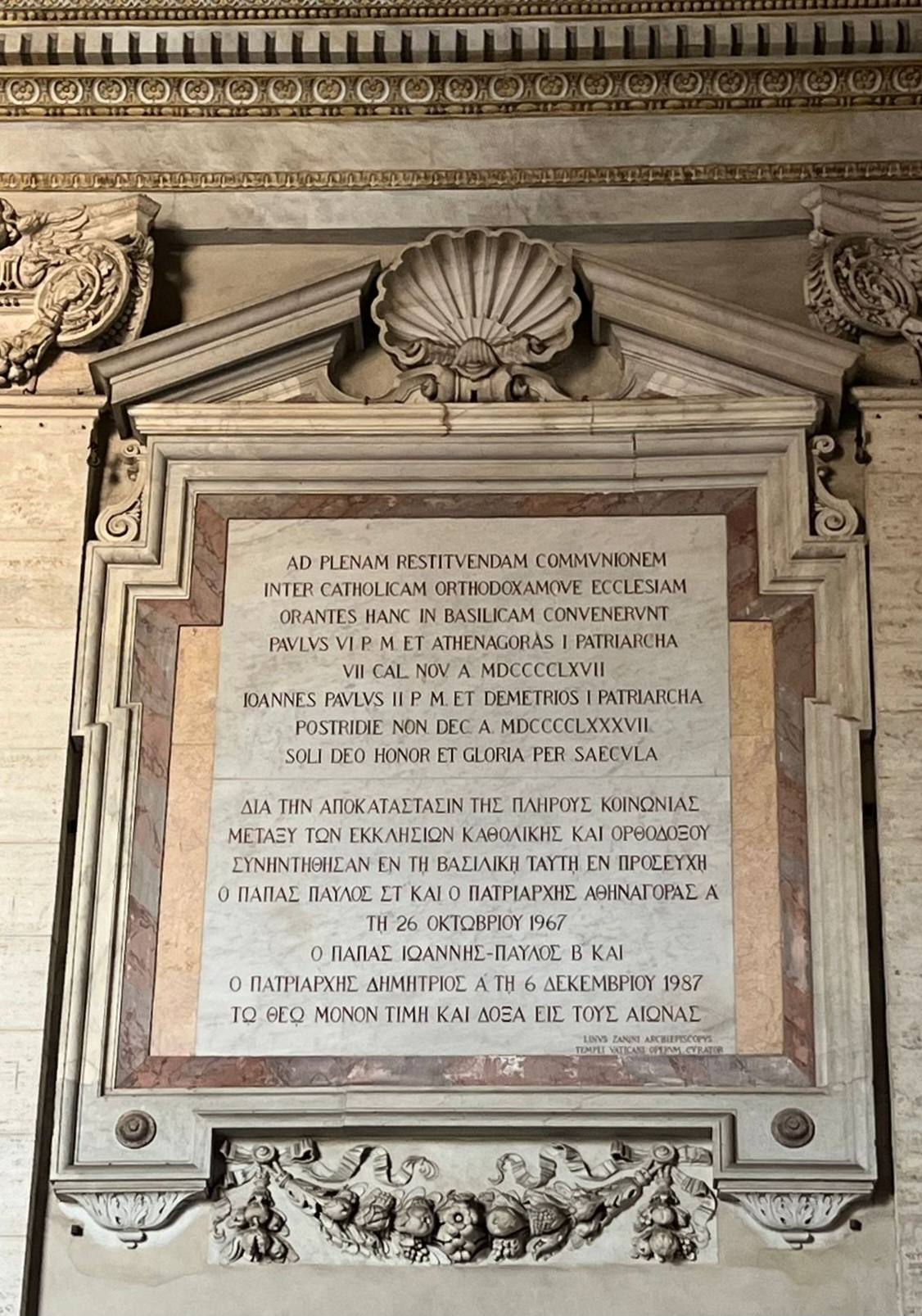
Commemorative tablet of Catholic-Orthodox prayer at Saint Peter's Basilica, commemorating the meetings held between Pope Paul VI and Patriarch Athenagoras in 1967, and between Pope John Paul II and Patriarch Demetrios I of Constantinople in 1987.

=== Joint Theological Commission ===
Inspired by Vatican II that adopted the Unitatis Redintegratio decree on ecumenism in 1964 as well as the change of heart toward Ecumenism on the part of the Moscow Patriarchate that had occurred in 1961, the Vatican and 14 universally recognised autocephalous Orthodox Churches established the Joint International Commission for Theological Dialogue Between the Catholic Church and the Orthodox Church that first met in Rhodes in 1980 and is an ongoing endeavour.

=== Other moves toward reconciliation ===
On a number of occasions, Pope John Paul II recited the Nicene Creed with patriarchs of the Eastern Orthodox Church in Greek according to the original text. Both he and his successor, Pope Benedict XVI, have recited the Nicene Creed jointly with Patriarchs Demetrius I and Bartholomew I in Greek without the Filioque clause, "according to the usage of the Byzantine Churches". This accords with the Catholic Church's practice of including the clause when reciting the Creed in Latin, but not when reciting it in Greek.

In June 1995, Patriarch Bartholomew I, of Constantinople, visited Vatican City for the first time, and joined in the historic inter-religious day of prayer for peace at Assisi. John Paul II and Bartholomew I explicitly stated their mutual "desire to relegate the excommunications of the past to oblivion and to set out on the way to re-establishing full communion".

In May 1999, John Paul II was the first pope since the Great Schism to visit an Eastern Orthodox country: Romania. Upon greeting John Paul II, the Romanian Patriarch Teoctist stated: "The second millennium of Christian history began with a painful wounding of the unity of the Church; the end of this millennium has seen a real commitment to restoring Christian unity." John Paul II visited other heavily Orthodox areas such as Ukraine, despite lack of welcome at times, and he said that healing the divisions between Western and Eastern Christianity was one of his fondest wishes.

In June 2004, Bartholomew I's visit to Rome for the Feast of Saints Peter and Paul (29 June) afforded him the opportunity for another personal meeting with John Paul II, for conversations with the Pontifical Council for Promoting Christian Unity and for taking part in the celebration for the feast day in St. Peter's Basilica.

The Patriarch's partial participation in the Eucharistic liturgy at which the Pope presided followed the program of the past visits of Patriarch Dimitrios (1987) and Patriarch Bartholomew I himself: full participation in the Liturgy of the Word, a joint proclamation by the Pope and by the Patriarch of the profession of faith according to the Nicene-Constantinopolitan Creed in Greek and as the conclusion, the final Blessing imparted by both the Pope and the Patriarch at the Altar of the Confessio. The Patriarch did not fully participate in the Liturgy of the Eucharist involving the consecration and distribution of the Eucharist itself.

Many Eastern Orthodox denominations have also started to use the Revised Julian calendar, which is heavily influenced by the Gregorian calendar of the Catholics. But anti-ecumenical conservative Eastern Orthodox denominations like the Russian Orthodox Church and the monastic community of Mount Athos, refuse to comply by, citing procedural errors at its adaptation.

== Prospects for reconciliation ==
Despite efforts on the part of Catholic popes and Orthodox patriarchs to heal the schism, only limited progress towards reconciliation has been made over the last half-century. One stumbling block is the fact that the Orthodox and the Catholics have different perceptions of the nature of the divide. The official Catholic teaching is that the Orthodox are schismatic, meaning that there is nothing heretical about their theology, and their unwillingness to accept the supremacy of the Pope is presented in Catholic teaching as chiefly an ecclesiological issue, not so much a theological one. The Orthodox object to the Catholic doctrines of purgatory, substitutionary atonement, the immaculate conception, and papal supremacy, among others, as heretical doctrines. With respect to primacy of the pope, the two churches agree that the pope, as Bishop of Rome, has primacy although they continue to have different interpretations of what that primacy entails.

The Catholic Church's attitude was expressed by John Paul II in the image of the church "breathing with her two lungs". He meant that there should be a combination of the more rational, juridical, organization-minded "Latin" temperament with the intuitive, mystical and contemplative spirit found in the East.

In the Orthodox view, the Bishop of Rome (i.e. the Pope) would have universal primacy in a reunited Christendom, as primus inter pares without the power of jurisdiction.

=== Ecclesiological reconciliation ===
The Eastern Orthodox insist that the primacy is largely one of honor, the Pope being "first among equals" primus inter pares. The Catholic Church, on the other hand, insists on the doctrine of supremacy. It is widely understood that, if there is to be reconciliation, both sides will have to compromise on this doctrine. Although some commentators have proposed ways in which such compromise can be achieved, there is no official indication that such compromise is being contemplated.

In his 1987 book Principles of Catholic Theology, Pope Benedict XVI (then Cardinal Ratzinger) assessed the range of "possibilities that are open to Christian ecumenism." He characterized the "maximum demand" of the West as the recognition by the East of and submission to the "primacy of the bishop of Rome in the full scope of the definition of 1870..." The "maximum demand" of the East was described as a declaration by the West of the 1870 doctrine of papal primacy as erroneous along with the "removal of the Filioque from the Creed and including the Marian dogmas of the nineteenth and twentieth centuries." Ratzinger asserted that "(n)one of the maximum solutions offers any real hope of unity."

Ratzinger wrote that "Rome must not require more from the East than had been formulated and what was lived in the first millennium." He concluded that "Reunion could take place in this context if, on the one hand, the East would cease to oppose as heretical the developments that took place in the West in the second millennium and would accept the Catholic Church as legitimate and orthodox in the form she had acquired in the course of that development, while on the other hand, the West would recognize the Church of the East as orthodox in the form she has always had."

The declaration of Ravenna in 2007 re-asserted the belief that the bishop of Rome is indeed the protos, although future discussions are to be held on the concrete ecclesiological exercise of papal primacy.

=== Theological reconciliation ===
Some scholars such as Jeffrey Finch assert that "the future of East–West rapprochement appears to be overcoming the modern polemics of neo-scholasticism and neo-Palamism".

These doctrinal issues center around the Orthodox perception that the Catholic theologians lack the actual experience of God called theoria and thereby fail to understand the importance of the heart as a noetic or intuitive faculty. It is what they consider to be the Catholic Church's reliance on pagan metaphysical philosophy and rational methods such as scholasticism rather than on the intuitive experience of God (theoria) that causes Orthodox to consider the Catholic Church heretical. Other points of doctrinal difference include a difference regarding human nature as well as a difference regarding original sin, purgatory, and the nature of Hell.

One point of theological difference is embodied in the dispute regarding the inclusion of the Filioque in the Nicene Creed. In the view of the Catholic Church, what it calls the legitimate complementarity of the expressions "from the Father" and "from the Father and the Son" does not provide it does not become rigid, affect the identity of faith in the reality of the same mystery confessed. The Orthodox, on the other hand, view inclusion of the phrase to be almost heretical (see also the Trinity section).

More importantly, the Orthodox see the Filioque as just the tip of the iceberg and really just a symptom of a much more deeply rooted problem of theology, one so deeply rooted that they consider it to be heretical and even, by some characterizations, an inability to "see God" and know God. This heresy is allegedly rooted in Frankish paganism, Arianism, Platonist, and Aristotelian philosophy and Thomist rational and objective Scholasticism. In opposition to what they characterize as pagan, heretical and "godless" foundations, the Orthodox rely on intuitive and mystical knowledge and vision of God (theoria) based on hesychasm and noesis. Catholics accept as valid the Eastern Orthodox intuitive and mystical understanding of God and consider it complementary to the rational Western reflection.

==== Sacraments ====
Most Orthodox Churches through economy do not require baptism in the Orthodox Church for one who has been previously baptized in the Catholic Church. Most Orthodox jurisdictions, based on that same principle of economy, allow a sacramental marriage between an Orthodox Christian and some non-Orthodox Christians. The Catholic Church allows its clergy to administer the sacraments of Penance, the Eucharist and Anointing of the Sick to members of the Eastern Orthodox Church, if these spontaneously ask for the sacraments and are properly disposed.

It also allows Catholics who cannot approach a Catholic minister to receive these three sacraments from the clergy of the Eastern Orthodox Church, whenever necessity requires or a genuine spiritual advantage commends it, and provided the danger of error or indifferentism is avoided. Catholic canon law allows marriage between a Catholic and an Orthodox. The Orthodox Church will only administer the sacraments to Christians who are not Orthodox if there is an emergency.

The Code of Canons of the Eastern Churches authorizes the local Catholic bishop to permit a Catholic priest, of whatever rite, to bless the marriage of Orthodox faithful who, being unable without great difficulty to approach a priest of their own church, ask for this spontaneously. In exceptional circumstances Catholics may, in the absence of an authorized priest, marry before witnesses. If a priest who is not authorized for the celebration of the marriage is available, he should be called in, although the marriage is valid even without his presence. The Code of Canons of the Eastern Churches specifies that, in those exceptional circumstances, even a "non-Catholic" priest (and so not necessarily one belonging to an Eastern Church) may be called in.

=== Criticism of reconciliation efforts ===
The efforts of Orthodox patriarchs towards reconciliation with the Catholic Church has been strongly criticized by some elements of Eastern Orthodoxy, such as the Metropolitan of Kalavryta, Greece, in November 2008.

In 2010, Patriarch Bartholomew I issued an encyclical lauding the ongoing dialogue between the Orthodox Church and other Christian churches and lamenting that the dialogues between the two churches were being criticized in "an unacceptably fanatical way" by some who claim to be defenders of Orthodoxy despite the fact that these dialogues are being conducted "with the mutual agreement and participation of all local Orthodox Churches". The Patriarch warned that "such opponents raise themselves above episcopal synods and risk creating schisms". A major point of contention in the way of ecumenical dialogue is the question of calendar reform in the Orthodox Church, particularly regarding the adoption of the Revised Julian calendar (heavily influenced by the Gregorian calendar of the West). Opponents of ecumenism within the Eastern Orthodox Church, using the pretext of calendar reform, have separated themselves into Old Calendarist groups.

The Patriarch further accused some critics of distorting reality to "deceive and arouse the faithful" and of depicting theological dialogue not as a pan-Orthodox effort, but an effort of the Ecumenical Patriarchate alone. As an example, he pointed to "false rumors that union between the Roman Catholic and Orthodox Churches is imminent" claiming that the disseminators of such rumors were fully aware that "the differences discussed in these theological dialogues remain numerous and require lengthy debate". The Patriarch re-emphasized that "union is not decided by theological commissions but by Church Synods".

== See also ==
- Catholic–Eastern Orthodox relations
- List of schisms in Christianity
- Symbolism of domes
