= Persecution of Christians in the Eastern Bloc =

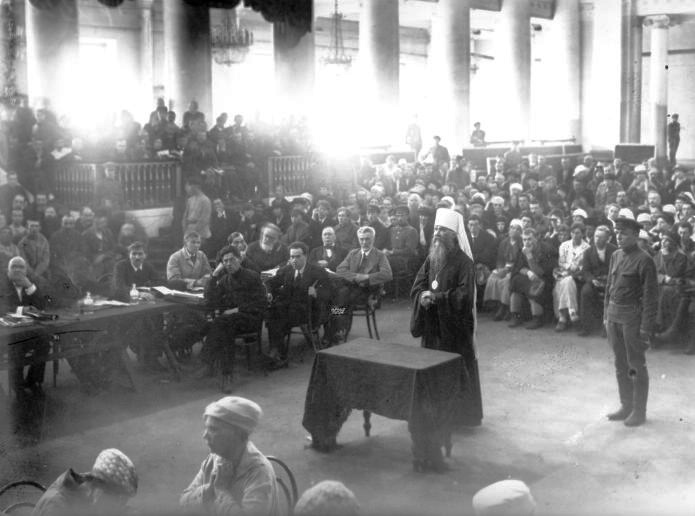
Russian Orthodox metropolitan Benjamin of Petrograd during his show trial for "counter-revolutionary agitation", after leading nonviolent resistance to Soviet anti-religious legislation. He was later executed by firing squad.

Christians in the Eastern Bloc were subjected to severe persecution under the state atheism of most of the Bloc. After the October Revolution, there was a movement within the Soviet Union to unite all of the people of the world under communist rule known as world communism. Communism as interpreted by Vladimir Lenin and his successors in the Soviet government included the abolition of religion and to this effect the Soviet government launched a long-running unofficial campaign to eliminate religion from society. Since some of these Slavic states tied their ethnic heritage to their ethnic churches, both the peoples and their churches were targeted by the Soviets.

Across Eastern Europe following World War II, parts of the former Nazi Germany liberated by the Soviet Red Army and Yugoslav Partisans became one-party communist states and the project of coercive conversion to atheism continued. The Soviet Union ended its war time truce against the Russian Orthodox Church, and extended its persecutions to the newly communist Eastern bloc. While the churches were generally not as severely treated as they had been in the Soviet Union, nearly all their schools and many of their churches were closed, and they lost their formally prominent roles in public life. Children were taught atheism, and clergy were imprisoned or killed by the thousands. In the Eastern Bloc, Christian churches, along with Jewish synagogues and Islamic mosques were forcibly converted into museums of atheism.

== Treatment of Christians ==
=== Soviet Union ===
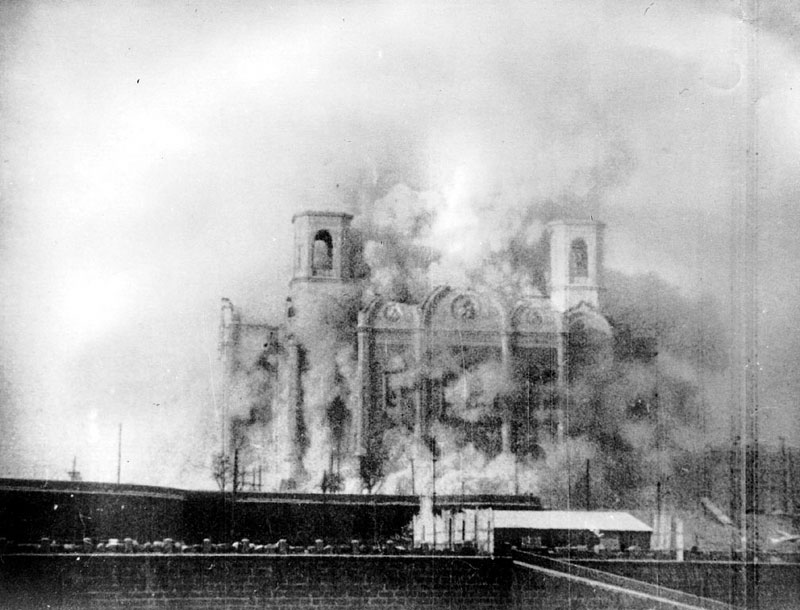
Demolition of the Cathedral of Christ the Saviour on 5 December 1931

Very soon after the October Revolution, the campaign to end religion – and more specifically, Christianity, Judaism and Islam – began. In 1920, the White Sea camp was opened on the grounds of a former Russian Orthodox Monastery. Described by some as a proto-gulag, it took mainly Orthodox and Catholic priests which didn't comply with government statutes.

From 1917 until 1991, Christians were imprisoned by Soviet authorities for numerous reasons such as protesting antireligious policies, leading congregations, conducting missionary work, organizing Sunday schools, mobilizing the youth to Christian societies, political opposition to Soviet power, national or class identity, and ordinary crimes.

Under the doctrine of state atheism in the Soviet Union, there was a "government-sponsored program of forced conversion to atheism" conducted by Communists. As a part of its anti-religious campaign, the Communist Party destroyed Christian churches, as well as mosques and synagogues, ridiculed, harassed, incarcerated and executed religious leaders, flooded the schools and media with anti-religious teachings, and introduced a belief system called "scientific atheism", with its own rituals, promises and proselytizers. Many priests were killed and imprisoned, and thousands of churches were closed. In 1925, the government founded the League of Militant Atheists, a "nominally independent organization" meant to intensify religious persecution.

The state established atheism as the only scientific truth. Soviet authorities forbade the criticism of atheism and agnosticism or of the state's anti-religious policies, until 1936; such criticism could lead to forced retirement. Militant atheism became central to the ideology of the Communist Party of the Soviet Union and a high priority policy of all Soviet leaders. Christopher Marsh, a professor at Baylor University, writes that "Tracing the social nature of religion from Schleiermacher and Feuerbach to Marx, Engels, and Lenin...the idea of religion as a social product evolved to the point of policies aimed at the forced conversion of believers to atheism." A few years later, in 1929, priests were not considered workers; thus, they were given higher taxes. Priests also could not serve in the military because they were ineligible. The priests, because of their ineligibility, were given non-service taxes, which was calculated to be more than 100% of their income. Priests also were ineligible to join collective farms. Because of this, they were given no health care, pensions, or social security. By 1939, only 500 out of 50,000 churches remained open.

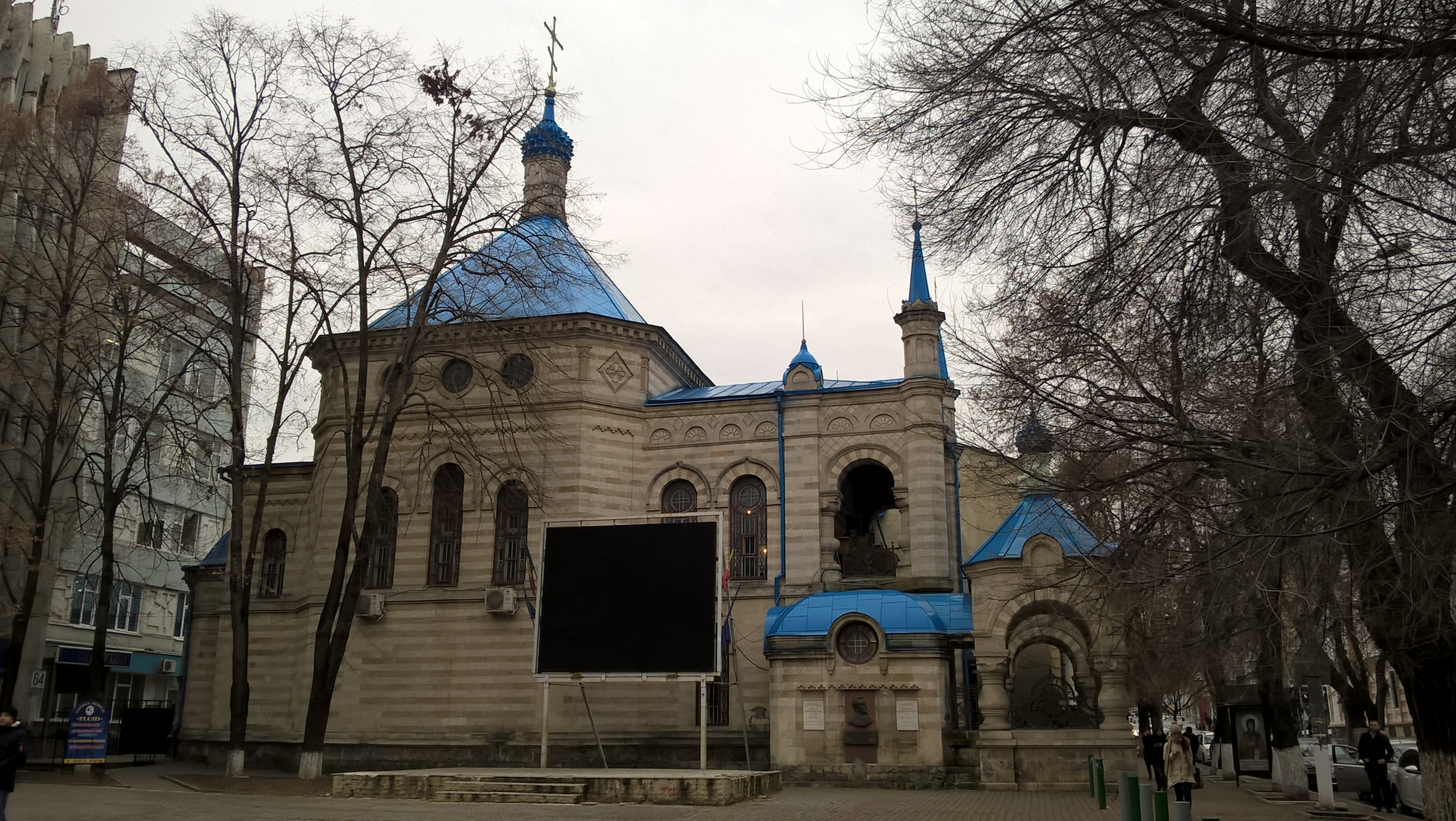
St. Teodora de la Sihla Church in Central Chișinău was one of the churches that were forcibly converted into museums of atheism, under the doctrine of Marxist–Leninist atheism.

Christian churches, as well as Jewish synagogues and Islamic mosques, were made into museums of atheism. Historical essayist Andrei Brezianu expounds upon this situation, writing that scientific atheism was "aggressively applied to Moldova, immediately after the 1940 annexation, when churches were profaned, clergy assaulted, and signs and public symbols of religion were prohibited"; he provides an example of this phenomenon, further writing that "St. Theodora Church in downtown Chişinău was converted into the city's Museum of Scientific Atheism". Marxist-Leninist regimes treated religious believers as subversives or abnormal, sometimes relegating them to psychiatric hospitals and reeducation. Nevertheless, historian Emily Baran writes that "some accounts suggest the conversion to militant atheism did not always end individuals' existential questions".

After the German invasion of the USSR in 1941, Stalin revived the Russian Orthodox Church to raise morale for the war effort. Consequently, by 1957, there were almost 22,000 Orthodox churches in the USSR. However, in 1959, Nikita Khrushchev initiated a new anti-religious campaign, which led to the closure of almost 12,000 churches. By 1985, only 7,000 churches remained active.

By the end of the Khrushchev era, 50,000 clergy were executed, and many of the church hierarchy were replaced by individuals who had connections with the KGB. With the drafting of the new 1977 Constitution, however, "freedom of conscience, that is, the right to profess or not to profess any religion, and to conduct religious worship or atheistic propaganda" was guaranteed.

In 1995, the Russian state commissioner confirmed that 200,000 Russian Orthodox priests, monks, and nuns were killed. In 1997, the remains of a Catholic bishop and 30 priests were found at Sandormokh, 240 kilometres (150 mi) north of St. Petersburg.

=== Bulgaria ===
In Bulgaria, Christianity was not persecuted to the same extent as other Abrahamic religions, such as Islam. In particular, the Bulgarian Orthodox Church, due to "its historic role in helping preserve Bulgarian nationalism and culture", was treated with favor by the communist government. This was in exchange for total submission to the state and a limitation of activities. However, Christians who refused to toe the party line, mainly Roman Catholics and Protestants, were often harassed and had few legal rights.

=== Czechoslovakia ===
Shortly after the 1948 Czechoslovak coup d'état, the new president Klement Gottwald began his attacks on the Catholic Church. During the meeting of the Central Committee of the Communist Party of Czechoslovakia on June 9th, Gottwald stated that the new republic must "turn away from Rome, towards a national Church” and that it was "necessary to neutralize the church and get it into our hands so that it serves the regime".

In its efforts to destroy organized religion, the Czechoslovak government emulated many practices of the anti-religious campaign in the Soviet Union, such as creating bodies to control religious activities and punishing priests who failed to comply with the many laws on religion; the Catholic Church in particular was targeted due to its historical alliance with the nobility during the Austro-Hungarian Empire, leading to the state labeling Catholic clergy as enemies of the people. The punishments meted out for such violations were not as great as occurred in the USSR, however.

Slovak émigrés abroad contributed resources to the church under communist rule in Slovakia and smuggled religious literature into Slovakia through Poland. Pope Paul VI created an independent archbishop for Slovakia in 1977; however, the government blocked an appointment of a new archbishop until 1988.

=== East Germany ===
Early on in the history of the German Democratic Republic, churches had more rights and provisions in comparison to other Eastern Bloc countries under Articles 41–48 of the 1949 Constitution, such as the capacity to take a position on public issues and establish religious schools. However, as the Cold War heated up in the mid-1950s, atheism became a topic of major interest for the state, in both domestic and foreign contexts. Religion became contested ground, with the governing SED promoting state atheism, although some people remained loyal to Christian communities.

The Landeskirche had a long history of submission to the temporal authorities. This submission under Nazi rule led to many of its members being compromised or silent on various moral issues. Once the communists took power in the East, the Protestants broke with historical precedent and became opponents of the government. In 1945, they formed part of a common umbrella with Protestants in West Germany, the Evangelical Church in Germany (EKD), and rejected silence on moral issues. The East German Protestant churches were the largest organizations in the country that were independent of the communist party or the state.

In 1969, under the pressure of the East German government, the regional Protestant churches in East Germany seceded from the EKD, forming a new organization called the Confederation of Protestant Churches in the GDR (BEK). The churches were called to be promoters of socialism; however, the churches themselves, while accepting this role, also considered themselves to be the determiners of what this meant, criticizing the state when its policies were immoral and applauded the state when its policies were positive. They provided such a strong force that the regime sometimes had to change its policies as a result of church pressure.

The government put significant pressure on the churches to submit to its authority, nonetheless. It did not, however, attempt to implement the same level of state control over churches as occurred in other Warsaw pact countries. The regime had difficulties in attempting to control the Protestant churches in Germany as a result of their fragmented nature, even down to the local level and the regionalism present in Germany.

As in neighboring Poland, the churches in East Germany championed the mass political dissent against the regime in the 1980s. Most of the mass protests began with church prayer meetings that provided a focus for the opposition. It fostered the youth counter culture and emphasized the church's positive role in society. The churches fostered discussion on issues such as rock music, sexuality, life in the third world, alcoholism, life in the GDR, and the militarization of society, etc. This drew large crowds.

The churches promoted change in the GDR, not by overthrowing the authorities, but through peaceful change.

=== Poland ===
The Catholic Church in Poland provided strong resistance to the Communist regime and Poland itself had a long history of dissent to foreign rule. The Polish nation rallied to the church, just as occurred in neighboring Lithuania, which made it more difficult for the regime to impose its anti religious policies in the same fashion as it had in the USSR, wherein the populace did not hold mass solidarity with the Russian Orthodox church. The Catholic Church unequivocally condemned Communist ideology. The Communists in Poland largely failed in their attempt to suppress and control the Polish church.

The experiences in World War II, wherein the large Jewish minority was annihilated by the Nazis and the large German minority was forcibly expelled from the country at the end of the war, as well as the loss of the eastern territories that were heavily populated by Eastern Orthodox Ukrainians, led to Poland becoming more homogeneously Catholic than it had been in previous times.

After Soviet troops occupied Poland at the end of World War II, the Soviet government then enacted a gradual approach aimed at gaining control of the Catholic Church in Poland. In 1950, the Polish government created the Bureau for Religious Affairs, which had jurisdiction over personnel decisions and organizational functions.

The state tried to take control of the Polish Orthodox Church, with a membership of about half a million, in order to use it as a weapon against the Roman Catholic Church in Poland, arresting its leader Metropolitan Dionysius and forcibly retiring him after his release.

Under the doctrine of Marxism, the state actively advocated for the disenfranchisement of religion and planned atheization. To this effect, the regime conducted anti-religious propaganda and persecution of clergymen and monasteries. As in most other Communist countries, religion was not outlawed as such (an exception being Albania) and was permitted by the constitution, but the state attempted to achieve an atheistic society.

Persecutions of individuals for religion in the first few years were rare, because the state initially was concerned strictly with suppressing armed political resistance. From 1947 to 1953, the Catholic Church in Poland became the primary target for persecution in Communist Poland. All social and charitable organizations affiliated with the church were made illegal, Catholic schools were closed, crosses were removed from classrooms and hospitals, and a terror campaign was enacted against parishes and monasteries (which included the notable arrest of a group of Jesuits headed by Father Tomasz Rostworowski).

Salesian schools and orphanages were closed. The Rozanystok seminary, which was created in 1949, was brutally liquidated in 1954. It had been moved from Wilno and had been run by Salesians for training candidates for the priesthood, as well as for giving Catholic education for boys. The seminary was situated in Eastern Poland, it employed former residents of the territory annexed by the USSR in 1939, and it had caused great concern to the government, provoking its brutal closure.

Catholic publications continued to exist, although under pressure from the state. These publications included Tygodnik Warszawski, Tygodnik Powszechny, and Dziś i Jutro. This was a liberty that was not allowed to other places in the Soviet bloc, including the USSR most notably, which had banned church publications in 1929. The founders of Tygodnik Warszawski were incarcerated, of which Father Zygmunt Kaczynski and Antoni Antczak both died in prison.

Polish society was prepared for the post-World War II persecutions due to its long history prior to the Bolshevik revolution of operation underneath the rule of regimes that were hostile to it. Underground universities taught uncensored history and ethics lessons, and many people openly attended church in protest against the Communist government.

Following with the forcible conversion of Eastern Catholics in the USSR to Orthodoxy, the Polish government called on the Orthodox church in Poland to assume 'pastoral care' of the eastern Catholics in Poland. After the removal of Metropolitan Dionizy from leadership of the Polish Orthodox Church, Metropolitan Macarius was placed in charge. He was from western Ukraine (previously eastern Poland) and who had been instrumental in the compulsory conversion of eastern Catholics to orthodoxy there. Polish security forces assisted him in suppressing resistance in his taking control of Eastern Catholic parishes. Many Eastern Catholics who remained in Poland after the postwar border adjustments were resettled in Western Poland in the newly acquired territories from Germany. The state in Poland gave the POC a greater number of privileges than the Roman Catholic Church in Poland; the state even gave money to this church, although it often defaulted on promised payments, leading to a perpetual financial crisis for the POC.

A notable feature of the anti-religious campaign in Poland included "patriot priests" who opposed the church hierarchy and supported Communism. In return, they were rewarded and even sometimes allowed to travel to Rome. These priests could be blackmailed into cooperation. The core of their group was often formed by men who had experienced the camps and been tortured. The bishops often let them remain at their posts, although they were commonly ostracized by the laity.

After the accession of Wladyslaw Gomulka to power in 1956, the state lightened its restrictions on the Eastern Catholic churches which began to grow back, partly with assistance from the rest of the Catholics.

The security apparatus in Poland, as in other communist nations, recruited members of the clergy. The security service used blackmail, psychological manipulation and a variety of material rewards (e.g. needed medicines for ill relatives) in order to secure the cooperation of clergy. In a reversal, the security service and Polish government had also members in its ranks who were secretly providing beneficial information to the church, but Catholic youth were forced to enroll in Communist Youth organizations.

From the 1960s onward, Poland developed an increasingly vocal Catholic intelligentsia and an active movement of young Catholics. The "Oasis" movement was created in the 1960s by Father Franciszek Blachniki, and it consisted of church activities including pilgrimages, retreats and various ecumenical endeavors. Intense efforts by the state to undermine it failed.

Beginning in the early 1970s, the church moved from a defensive stance to a more aggressive stance in speaking in defense of human rights.

Cardinal Primate of Poland, Stefan Wyszynski, believed that Poland had a special role to play in human history and he supported Polish nationalism as a precursor to the liberation of Eastern Europe from Soviet role. Such ideas were popular among many Polish Catholics, as well. Wyszynski was brought into sharp conflict with the Communist authorities on account of this (he also experienced some conflict with the Vatican); during his reign, he was jailed for three years for his refusal to cooperate with the government. He was both a critic of the regime and a mediator between the regime and the rest of civil society. Wyszynski provided a significant obstacle to the Communists taking control of the church in Poland; he died in 1981 and was replaced by Cardinal Josef Glemp.

After Cardinal Wojtyla of Kraków became Pope John Paul II in 1978, his election was greeted in Poland with great enthusiasm. He visited Poland from June 2–10 in 1979. During his visit, he bluntly challenged communist ideology by declaring that Christianity was the route to true human freedom as opposed to Marxism and called people to non-conformance. Over thirteen million people went into the streets to greet him in his visit, in direct defiance to the Polish government. Dissidents in Poland and elsewhere in Eastern Europe took great notice of this fact. Radoslaw Sikorski, in his memoir, later said "We realized for the first time that 'we' were more numerous than 'them'..."

Within a year, the independent trade union Solidarity was formed. While initially based on economic concerns, it soon became deeply affiliated with the church. The Pope promoted Poland's cause as well as the cause of Christians behind the Iron Curtain on an international level, to the great discomfort of the communist governments in the Warsaw Pact. The church in Poland played a key role in the revolution against the regime in the 1980s and provided symbols (the Black Madonna, the suffering Christ, etc.) that gave spiritual depth to the struggle against communism. It also provided spiritual and material comfort to striking workers, and acted as a mediator between Solidarity and the government.

In December 1981, martial law was imposed throughout Poland. This caused great trouble for the church, and many were rounded up by the military. Cardinal Glemp initially seemed to justify its imposition as a lesser evil, but many in the church defended those who were arrested.

The Polish Orthodox Church hierarchy, which had had their position in society strengthened since 1945, spoke out against the Solidarity movement. They refused to send delegates to meetings about human rights issues. Some exceptions occurred, such as Father Piotr Poplawski, an Orthodox priest openly sympathetic to Solidarity who died in 1985; his death was officially listed as a suicide, although such a claim was disputed by the doctors responsible for his autopsy.

Communist authorities blamed nationalist Catholics for fanning strife between Catholic and Orthodox populations.

In the Gdańsk Agreement, an accord reached between the Polish government and striking shipyard workers, the church was given permission to perform radio broadcasts. As the 1980s progressed, the church became increasingly critical of the regime and in the last years of the decade it played a critical role in the transition to democracy.

=== Romania ===
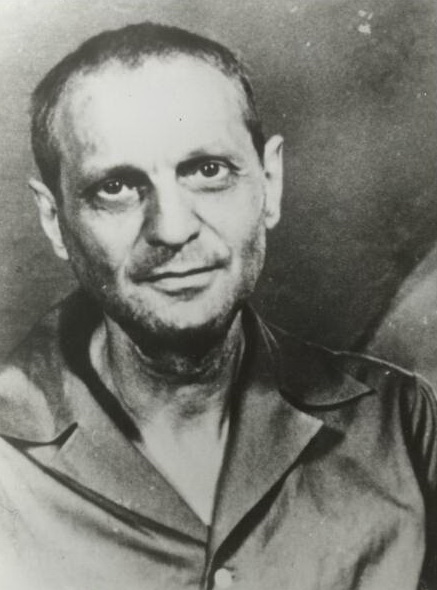
Christian pastor Richard Wurmbrand, who was imprisoned and tortured for 14 years because of his religious faith

The Romanian Orthodox Church had a long history of submitting to foreign rulers, and when the communists took power after the Soviet army occupied Romania, that was used to their advantage. The government ensured that the Patriarch was always someone who was loyal to them and priests who were opposed to the communists were removed. Under the doctrine of Marxist–Leninist atheism, the People's Republic of Romania took a hostile stance against religion, and set its sights on the ultimate goal of an atheistic society.

After World War II, with Northern Transylvania becoming again part of Romania, non-Orthodox ethnic minorities became more numerous. Rivalries developed in the different religious groups and the government used this to its own advantage by letting the church strengthen its position in society in exchange for giving greater government control over it. This agreement played a major factor in the weakening of the Eastern Catholic Churches and their semi-forced integration into the Orthodox community.

Members of the PCR chose who served in the church, who was admitted to seminary, and even what the content of sermons would be. Although these successive constitutions provided a simulacrum of religious freedom, the regime in fact had a policy of promoting atheism, coupled with religious persecution. The role of religious bodies was strictly limited to their houses of worship, and any visible demonstrations were strictly forbidden. In 1948, in order to minimize the role of the clergy in society, the government adopted a decree nationalizing church property, including schools.

Once complete control of the church was achieved, the government felt free to persecute its membership, which the hierarchy of the church turned a blind eye towards. As Nicolae Ceausescu increasingly gained control, the only religious bodies that provided significant dissent to the regime were evangelical Protestants, who formed only a small portion of the population.

A notable Christian revival occurred in Romania in the 1980s, something which, according to the United States Department of State, was coupled by an increase in repression. Charismatic religious leaders were subject to harassment, imprisonment and forced emigration. Churches had difficulties in trying to enlarge their facilities to accommodate the influx of converts, and some which attempted to do so without permission had their buildings torn down. Printing and importing Bibles was very difficult, and reportedly Bibles could be pulped for making toilet paper.

Widespread dissent from religious groups in Romania did not appear until revolution was sweeping across Eastern Europe in 1989. The Patriarch of the Romanian Orthodox Church supported Ceausescu up until the end of the regime, and even congratulated him after the state murdered one hundred demonstrators in Timișoara. It was not until the day before Ceausescu's execution on December 24, 1989, that the Patriarch condemned him as "a new child-murdering Herod".

In Romania, more than 5,000 Orthodox priests were imprisoned, and 400 priests from Romania's Eastern-rite were killed. The Orthodox archdiocese of Cluj contains biographies of 1,700 church personnel jailed.

=== Hungary ===
In Hungary, a 443-page collection, published by Gyula Havasy in 1990, reveals 10 church show trials and the detention of 2,800 monks and nuns. Many thousands of Christians were imprisoned and many others were martyred. Perhaps the best known was bishop Vilmos Apor.

=== Albania ===
At the close of World War II, certain religious leaders were imprisoned or executed on grounds that they were either spies for the Italian protectorate government or affiliated with Balli Kombëtar, an anti-communist collaborationist militia. These leaders typically spent decades in prison and penal labor. Baba Murteza of Kruje was tortured and thrown from a prison window to his death in 1946; Baba Kamil Glava of Tepelen was executed by a court in Gjirokastër in 1946; Baba Ali Tomori was executed by a court in 1947; and Baba Shefket Koshtani of Tepelan was shot by a court in 1947.

Early on, persecution mainly affected the Roman Catholic Church, which made up 10% of the population. This was mainly due to how organized and well-linked it was to organizations outside Albania, unlike the autocephalous Albanian Orthodox Church. Other religious minorities, such as the Bektashi Order of Sufis, were targeted for similar reasons. Cathedrals and other religious buildings were often closed or converted. By 1967, 2,167 religious buildings had been closed or converted to other uses, such as the Roman Catholic cathedral in Shkodër, which became a sports arena. Many churches only survived by being marked for historical preservation.

Enver Hoxha declared the state atheist in 1967, stating that "Albania is the world's first atheistic state, whose only religion is Albanianism." The same year, Article 37 was added to the Albanian Constitution, which stated:

The state recognizes no religion whatsoever and supports atheist propaganda for the purpose of inculcating the scientific materialist world outlook in people.

This resulted in a massive anti-religious campaign greater in scale and scope than previous efforts.

Considerable anti-religious propaganda was produced with such slogans, claiming religion was "not of the enlightened world" and lowered women's status. Church centers were moved to holy sites to marginal, out-of-the-way locations and religious leaders were then relegated to what was essentially house arrest within them. Young people were encouraged to attack places of worship and to turn in remaining clergy to the authorities, who would then either kill them or send them to penal labor camps. Tombstones with any religious symbols were overturned and people caught wearing religious symbols could be sentenced to 10 years imprisonment. To prevent people from giving religious names to children, a dictionary of approved names for children was published.

Hoxha died in 1985, and throughout the late 1980s, atheistic policies were slowly reversed. In 1988 Albanian emigre religious leaders were allowed to visit Albania; in 1989 Mother Teresa, herself an ethnic Albanian born in the Ottoman Empire, came to visit Albania after previously denied permission.

In November 1990, in Shkodër, a Catholic priest named Don Simon Jubani was released from prison after 26 years, and he celebrated Mass in a ransacked cemetery; he was immediately arrested for worship in public, but when the building that he was being held in was surrounded by people, he was released again. That same month, he performed another public Mass for 50,000 people. In December 1990, the law against public religious practice was rescinded; elections were held the following year, and religious buildings re-opened.

== See also ==
- Clerical collaboration with communist secret services
- Religion in the Soviet Union
- Persecutions of the Catholic Church and Pius XII
- Persecution of Muslims in the former USSR
- Red Terror
- USSR anti-religious campaign (1921–1928)
- USSR anti-religious campaign (1928–1941)
- USSR anti-religious campaign (1958–1964)
- USSR anti-religious campaign (1970s–1987)
- Violence against Christians in India
