= Clerical collaboration with communist secret services =

Clerical collaboration with communist secret services occurred in some Eastern European countries during the Cold War. There were multiple reasons why certain clergy members chose to take this course of action. Some hoped to provide services to the government in exchange for a reversal of policies persecuting Christians. Others wished to buy favors from the authorities in order to advance their own careers, since the authorities could influence promotions within the Church hierarchies. Finally, there are claims that some clergy members were secret service agents from the beginning, working undercover.

== Czechoslovakia ==
The association of Catholic Clergy Pacem in Terris was a regime-sponsored organisation of Catholic clergy in the communist Czechoslovakia between 1971 and 1989. Its name was taken from the well-known encyclical Pacem in terris of Pope John XXIII. SKD PiT was registered on August 1, 1971 and its stated purposes were 'peace in the world' and 'friendship between nations'. But in fact its raison d'être was rather to control and spy the clergy and influence the life of the whole church. Its founding assembly was held in Prague on August 31, 1971.

== Poland ==
On 20 December 2006, journalists found documents from the communist archives according to which Archbishop Wielgus collaborated—or at least conversed—with the communist Secret Police during communist rule in Poland. This development was considered to be particularly significant in the context of post-communist Polish politics because public figures, particularly politicians, can be officially censured and barred from holding public office if found to have collaborated with the Security Services (Polish: Służba Bezpieczeństwa) of the People's Republic of Poland (Polish: PRL, Polska Rzeczpospolita Ludowa). The process of review of the Security Service's files, known in Poland as Lustration (Pol: Lustracja) has been the source of many political scandals in recent years. The Polish human rights ombudsman, Janusz Kochanowski, said on January 4, 2007, that there was evidence in the secret police archives that Archbishop Wielgus knowingly cooperated with the authorities of the Communist era.

Archbishop Wielgus acknowledged that he signed a cooperation statement in 1978, but insisted that he did so only under coercion and disputed the length and characterization of his contact as described in the published reports. He made a public statement on January 4, 2007 indicating that he only provided information concerning his own academic work, and that the reports seriously distorted the truth. However, according to the Polish national newspaper, Rzeczpospolita Wielgus had a more extensive role than he admitted, and alleged that he provided information about student activities as far back as 1967, when he was a philosophy student at the Catholic University of Lublin. Archbishop Wielgus only acknowledged a relationship beginning in 1978. Wielgus asked the Polish Bishops' Conference to examine the files pertaining to him.

The day after the discovery of the incriminating documents on 20 December 2006, the Catholic News Service announced that the Vatican Press Office had issued a statement of support regarding Wielgus: "The Holy See, in deciding the nomination of the new archbishop of Warsaw, took into consideration all the circumstances of his life, including those regarding his past .... (Pope Benedict XVI) has every confidence in Monsignor Stanisław Wielgus and in full conscience entrusted him the mission of pastor of the Archdiocese of Warsaw."

== Romania ==
After the Romanian Revolution, the Romanian Orthodox Church never admitted to willingly collaborating with the régime, but several Romanian Orthodox priests have admitted publicly after 1989 that they have collaborated with and/or were informers for the Securitate, the Romanian Communist secret police. A prime example was Bishop Nicolae Corneanu, the Metropolitan of Banat, who admitted his efforts on the behalf of the Communist Party, and denounced clergy activity with the Communists, including his own, as "the Church's prostitution with the Communist régime".

Before July 2006, when the matter made headlines again, Consiliul Național pentru Studierea Arhivelor Securității (The National Council for the Study of the Archives of the Securitate; CNSAS) has not made public any of the files of priests that collaborated with the Communist secret police, and has not responded to any requests by the civil society to reveal the truth in this matter. Historian Stejărel Olaru claimed in a TV interview in July 2006 that he had uncovered some documents that imply that the (now late) Patriarch of Romania Teoctist was an agent of the Securitate.

Constantin Stoica, the spokesperson of the Romanian Patriarchy, immediately denied that Teoctist had any doings with Securitate, and said that the Patriarchy would not ask CNSAS to verify informations regarding the alleged connections between the high-ranking people in the Church and the former secret police, because "it would mean to give too much importance to this information".

In November 2006, however, Stoica announced that the Synod of the Romanian Orthodox Church had decided to form a commission, whose members would be young historians and not clergy, which would work in parallel with CNSAS, so that "once CNSAS identifies cases of representatives of the Church that have collaborated with the Securitate, [the Synod] would take measures in full awareness of the facts. Every particular case would be subject to a court of the Church, in respect with the Canons of the Church."

Leonida Pop, who was stripped of his priesthood in the 1970s under Securitate's pressure due to his views considered reactionary by the Communists, and who subsequently fled to West Germany where he worked for a while for Radio Free Europe, told the BBC that many of the leaders of the Church in 2006 would not be strangers to collaboration with the Securitate. He said that during the Communist regime it was not possible to advance in the Church hierarchy without the consent of and collaboration with the Securitate. "I know a few Bishops, both former and present, which were devoted servants of the Securitate", Pop said.

In August 2008, CNSAS announced that it had verified 260 representatives of religious organisations, including 89 clergy of the Romanian Orthodox Church, for possible collaboration with the Securitate, and has found that 6 priests indeed have worked for the Communist secret police. CNSAS warned that "the number of priests that have collaborated with the Securitate is considerable, given the fact that verification in some cases is still under way". Among the confirmed cases of Securitate collaborators were five high prelates of the Romanian Orthodox Church: Nicolae Corneanu, Archbishop of Timișoara and Metropolitan of Banat, Pimen Zainea, Archbishop of Suceava and Rădăuţi, Andrei Andreicuț, Archbishop of Alba Iulia, Casian Crăciun, Bishop of Lower Danube, and Calinic Argatu, Bishop of Argeș. The sixth person was Sandi Mehedințu, parochial priest at Colțea Church in Bucharest.

== Russia ==
According to Mitrokhin Archive and other sources, the Moscow Patriarchate has been established on the order from Joseph Stalin in 1943 as a front organization of NKVD and later the KGB. All key positions in the Church including bishops have been approved by the Ideological Department of Communist Party of the Soviet Union (CPSU) and by the KGB. The priests were used as agents of influence in the World Council of Churches and front organizations, such as World Peace Council, Christian Peace Conference, and the Rodina ("Motherland") Society founded by the KGB in 1975.

The future Russian Patriarch Alexius II said that Rodina has been created to "maintain spiritual ties with our compatriots" as one of its leading organizers. According to the archive and other sources, Alexius has been working for the KGB as agent DROZDOV and received an honorary citation from the agency for a variety of services. Priests have also recruited intelligence agents abroad and spied on Russian emigrant communities. This information by Mitrokhin has been corroborated by other sources.

In the early 1990s and later on, Patriarch Kirill of Moscow was accused of having links to the KGB during much of the Soviet period, as were many members of the hierarchy, and of pursuing the Communist Party of the Soviet Union's interests before those of the Russian Orthodox Church. His alleged KGB informant codename was "Mikhailov".

== Ukraine ==
These dissident ex-Ukrainian Greek Catholic Church clergy called a (Soviet-supervised) "synod" (Lviv Sobor of 1946) in Lviv and at this synod purported to annul the Union of Brest of 1596 and all of its statutes. Ex-UGCC priest Havryil Kostelnyk (who later died under dubious circumstances) was forced or convinced to preside over this Lviv Sobor of 1946, probably due to blackmailing by the Soviet NKVD and other secret services. Ironically, as all the bishops of the UGCC were at this point either in prison or exile, no bishops of the UGCC were involved, making the supposed synod or sobor canonically illegitimate by the official canons of both Orthodox and Catholic Churches alike. While officially all of the church property was transferred to the Russian Orthodox Church under the Moscow Patriarchate, some Ukrainian Greek Catholic clergy went underground. This catacomb church was strongly supported by the diaspora created by the Ukrainian diaspora, particularly in the Western Hemisphere, which had begun already in the 1870s and increased at the end of World War II.
