= Catholic–Eastern Orthodox relations =

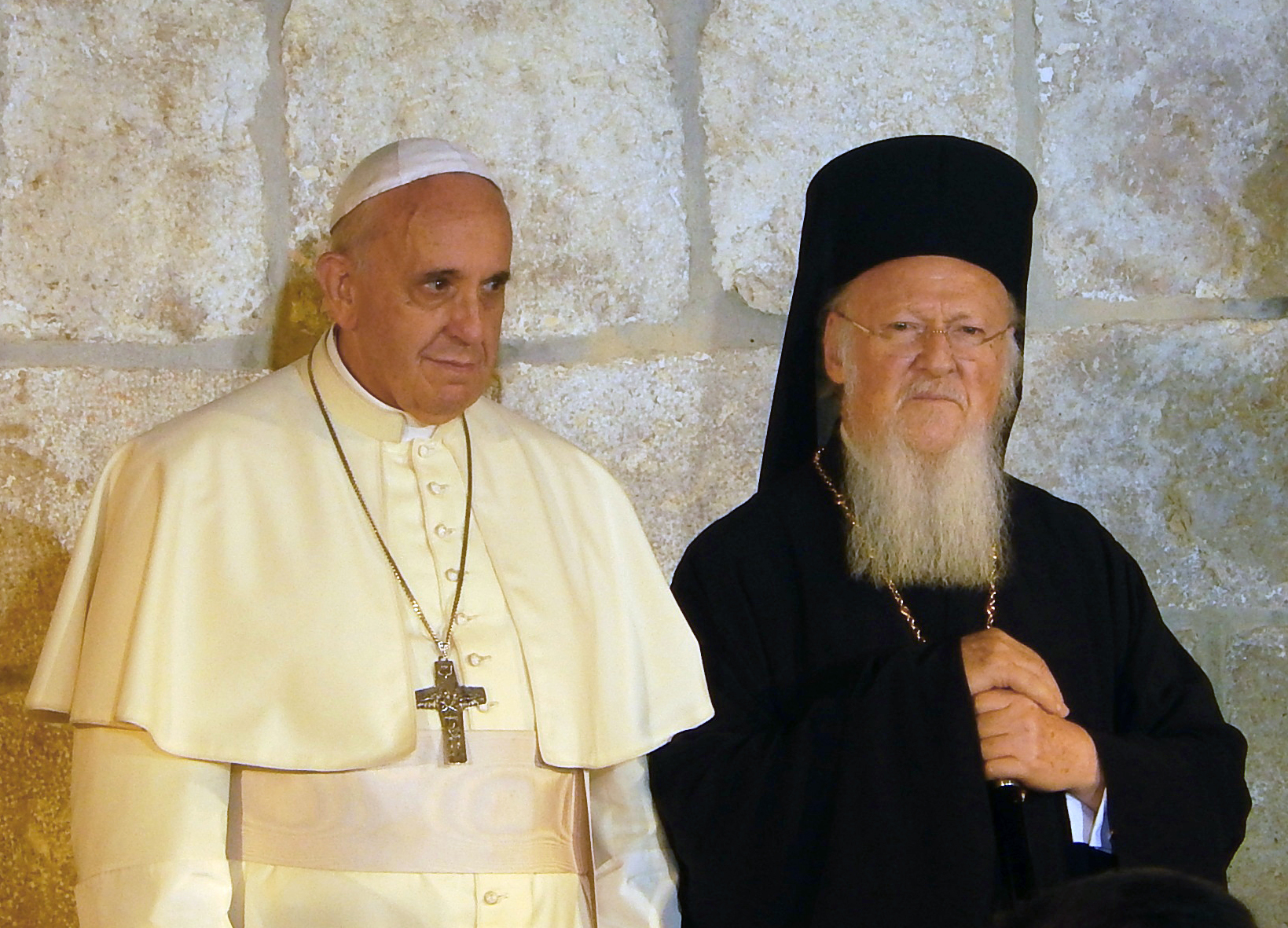
Pope Francis of the Catholic Church (left) and Ecumenical Patriarch Bartholomew of the Eastern Orthodox Church (right)

The Catholic Church and Eastern Orthodox Church broke communion during the East–West Schism of 1054. While an informal divide between the East and West existed prior to the split, these were internal disputes, under the umbrella of the recognised “one, holy, catholic and apostolic Church” of the Nicene Creed. It is only after the formal schism of the 11th century that two, distinct churches are seen to exist, and thus commence relations. The split has, on both sides, been immensely lamented, for it defeats the exhortation of Jesus Christ “that they may all be one" (John 17:21). The anguish over the past has spurred both sides, particularly in recent decades, to work towards restoring Christian unity through ecumenical efforts.

Relations between the East and West have warmed over the last century, as both churches embrace a dialogue of charity. The Second Vatican Council (1962–1965) ushered in a new era of relations for the Roman Church towards the Eastern Orthodox Church, fondly describing the Orthodox as “separated brethren” with valid sacraments and an apostolic priesthood. Likewise, the Eastern Orthodox Church encouraged local churches to prepare for future dialogue in the Third Pan-Orthodox Conference in Rhodes (1964), and has since engaged in several ecumenical efforts with the Vatican. Significantly, in 1965 Pope Paul VI and Ecumenical Patriarch Athenagoras I of Constantinople jointly lifted the mutual excommunications of 1054. In November 2019, the current Ecumenical Patriarch of Constantinople, Bartholomew I, stated that in his view, the reunification of the Eastern Orthodox and Catholic churches is inevitable.

== Historical relations ==
The East and West were two centres of influence throughout Christian history. While an informal divide existed prior, in 1054 mutual excommunications were formally issued, thereby rupturing relations and causing schism. Multiple attempts at healing the union have taken place, most notably at the Second Council of Lyon and the Council of Florence, which were both ultimately unsuccessful. The only reconciliation that has been brought about is in the creation of Eastern Catholic Churches, which are also a point of disconcertment for the Eastern Orthodox.

=== Schism and estrangement ===
The "Great Schism" connotes the unremitting rupture of communion between the Catholic and Orthodox families. Historians of the split have traditionally, following in the footsteps of Edward Gibbon, recognised 1054 as the watershed of relational breakdown between the Eastern and Western spheres of the Christian World. In this sense, the schism can be understood as an event; the mutual excommunications issued in 1054. The idea of a definitive break has, however, been called into question by more contemporary scholarship, which minimises the importance of this specific date.

This breakdown, however, was the culmination of a process of distancing which unfolded over prior centuries. Therefore, the schism can also rightfully be understood as an ongoing process of separation between the Greek East and Latin West beginning around the year 900.

The primary cause of the schism is often recognised to be the ecclesiological differences, most notably the Bishop of Rome's growing claim to universal jurisdiction. The pre-eminence of this factor, however, is a heavily contested point; with numerous scholars placing greater importance on the theological or political disagreements instead.

It is unsurprising that the relationship immediately following the schism was one of animosity, considering Augustine diagnosed the moral origin of schism as “hatred among brothers”. The phenomenon of cultural alienation between the Latin West and Greek East is crucial for understanding the historic relationship between the Catholic and Orthodox churches. The difference was, for one, pronounced in the language of the respective spheres. As a result, communication became more strained and several seminal works were not translated on both sides.

This led to a division in theological tradition in either milieu. The Eastern theologians relied more on the work of Greek philosophy, while in the West it was the Roman system of law that permeated the minds of theologians. One of the key divergences that emerged was regarding the nature and function of the church: fundamental ecclesiology. The relational breakdown was also highlighted by the filioque controversy, where Rome in 1014 inserted the clause “and the Son” (filioque in Latin) to describe the procession of the Holy Spirit into the Nicene Creed. The Orthodox argue that this modification was made in contravention of Canon 7 of the Council of Ephesus. (Note: Council of Ephesus, Canon 7: “It is unlawful for any man to bring forward, or to write, or to compose a different (ἑτέραν) Faith as a rival to that established by the holy Fathers assembled with the Holy Ghost in Nicæa. But those who shall dare to compose a different faith, or to introduce or offer it to persons desiring to turn to the acknowledgment of the truth, whether from Heathenism or from Judaism, or from any heresy whatsoever, shall be deposed, if they be bishops or clergymen; bishops from the episcopate and clergymen from the clergy; and if they be laymen, they shall be anathematized.”)

=== Massacre of the Latins ===
The Massacre of the Latins was a large-scale massacre of Roman Catholics (called "Latins") in Constantinople, the capital of the Eastern Roman Empire, by the Eastern Orthodox population of the city on April 11, 1182. The massacre was sparked by a number of factors, including the growing resentment of the Byzantines towards the Latins, who had come to dominate the empire's political and economic life, and the Byzantines' fear that the Latins were trying to undermine their Orthodox faith.

The massacre began when a large mob of Byzantines attacked the Latin quarter of the city. The mob killed hundreds of Latins, including women and children, and looted and burned their homes and businesses. The massacre continued for several days, until the Byzantine authorities were able to restore order. The exact number of people killed or forced to flee during the Massacre of the Latins is unknown, but it is estimated that the bulk of the Latin community in Constantinople, which was around 60,000 people at the time, was either killed or forced to flee, according to Eustathius of Thessalonica. The Genoese and Pisan communities were especially hard hit, with some 4,000 survivors being sold into slavery to the Sultanate of Rum.

The Massacre of the Latins had a profound impact on the relationship between the Orthodox and Catholic churches. The massacre led to a hardening of attitudes on both sides, and it made it much more difficult for the two churches to reconcile their differences. The massacre also damaged the Byzantine Empire's standing in the West, and it contributed to the empire's eventual decline.

=== Sack of Constantinople ===
In April 1204, Catholic Crusader armies captured and looted Constantinople, then the capital of the Byzantine Empire and seat of the Eastern Orthodox Church. After the city's sacking, most of the Byzantine Empire's territories were divided up among the Crusaders. The sack of Constantinople was a major turning point in medieval history. The Crusaders' decision to attack the world's largest Christian city was unprecedented and immediately controversial. Reports of Crusader looting and brutality scandalised and horrified the Orthodox world; the Byzantine Empire was left much poorer, smaller, and ultimately less able to defend itself against the Seljuk and Ottoman conquests that followed; the actions of the Crusaders thus directly accelerated the collapse of Christendom in the east, and in the long run helped facilitate the later Ottoman conquest.

Eight hundred years after the Fourth Crusade, Pope John Paul II twice expressed sorrow for the events of the Fourth Crusade. In 2001 he wrote that "It is tragic that the assailants, who set out to secure free access for Christians to the Holy Land, turned against their brothers in the faith. The fact that they were Latin Christians fills Catholics with deep regret." In 2004, while Bartholomew I, Patriarch of Constantinople, was visiting the Vatican, John Paul II asked, "How can we not share, at a distance of eight centuries, the pain and disgust?". In April 2004, in a speech on the 800th anniversary of the capture of the city, Ecumenical Patriarch Bartholomew I formally accepted the apology. "The spirit of reconciliation is stronger than hatred," he said during a liturgy attended by Roman Catholic Archbishop Philippe Barbarin of Lyon, France. "We receive with gratitude and respect your cordial gesture for the tragic events of the Fourth Crusade. It is a fact that a crime was committed here in the city 800 years ago."

=== Second Council of Lyon ===
The Second Council of Lyon in 1274 was an attempted reconciliation called by Pope Gregory X. The council had in attendance over 300 bishops, who discussed the union of the East and the West. Pope Gregory X said Mass for the Feast of Peter and Paul which was attended by both sides. The Greeks conceded the contested Filioque clause, which allowed reunification to be momentarily reached. However, it was only short lived, for while Emperor Michael VIII Palaeologus was enthusiastic about reunion, the Eastern clergy were largely opposed to the decisions of the council. Hence, when his son Andronikos II Palaiologos succeeded as Emperor, he repudiated the union.

=== Council of Florence ===
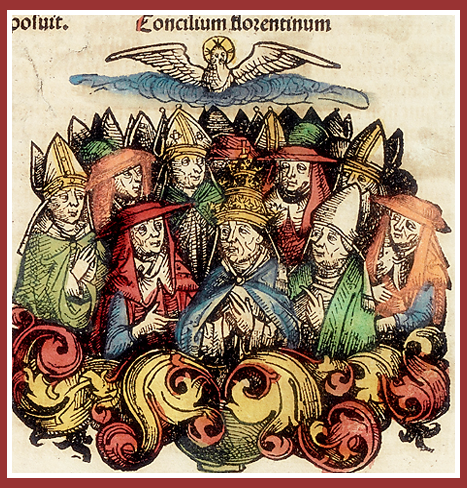
The Council of Florence

The Council of Florence (1438–1445) was one of the most significant attempts to restore communion between the Roman Catholic and Eastern Orthodox churches following the East–West Schism. Convened initially at Ferrara and later transferred to Florence, the council brought together representatives of the papacy, the Byzantine Empire, and several Eastern churches to address long-standing theological and ecclesiastical disputes.

After extensive negotiations, most members of the Byzantine delegation accepted formulations concerning the filioque, Purgatory, Papal primacy, and other issues, which formed the basis of the bull of union, Laetentur Caeli.

However, the union was not universally accepted among the Eastern Orthodox churches. The delegates of the Georgian Orthodox Church and the Greek Orthodox Patriarchate of Alexandria did not sign the decree of union, while the Serbian Orthodox Church rejected the union and was not represented at the council. Delegates from the Greek Orthodox Patriarchate of Antioch and the Greek Orthodox Patriarchate of Jerusalem signed the decree, but their patriarchs later repudiated the union.

After the Fall of Constantinople in 1453, the position of the Ecumenical Patriarchate of Constantinople under Ottoman rule further reduced contacts with the Catholic Church, and any remaining efforts toward the Florentine Union effectively ceased.

Eastern Orthodox theologians have argued that the Council of Florence should not be regarded as a valid ecumenical council, stating that it did not follow the traditional procedures associated with ecumenical councils. Ultimately, Florence served to highlight the overwhelming difficulty of unification.

=== Eastern Catholic Churches ===
Despite the failure of Florence, relations were fairly strong in the following centuries. The Eastern Catholic Churches emerged from a movement which sought to enter full communion with the Pope while retaining elements of their traditional liturgical practices and canonical rules. Here is a list of Eastern Catholic churches that have their origins in the Eastern Orthodox Church:

- Ruthenian Uniate Church (1595-1795)
  - Ukrainian Greek Catholic Church (1963)
  - Belarusian Greek Catholic Church (1990)
  - Russian Greek Catholic Church
- Byzantine (Ruthenian) Catholic Church (1646)
  - Hungarian Greek Catholic Church (1912)
  - Slovak Greek Catholic Church (2008)
- Romanian Greek Catholic Church (1698)
- Melkite Greek Catholic Church (1724)
- Italo-Albanian Catholic Church (1731)
- Greek Catholic Church of Croatia and Serbia (1777)
- Bulgarian Greek Catholic Church (1861)
- Greek Byzantine Catholic Church (1880)
- Albanian Greek Catholic Church (1939)
- Macedonian Greek Catholic Church (2001)

Many Eastern Orthodox have criticised what they pejoratively call 'Uniatism', as an inadequate method of healing the split. Leading Orthodox theologian and bishop Kallistos Ware has described this approach by Catholics, especially the Society of Jesus, as a "Trojan horse policy". In fact, Archpriest Vladislav Tsypin has even claimed that today this is the primary factor preventing the Orthodox and Catholics from fostering better relations. Those in favour of the Uniates, generally Catholics, look at these churches as a bridge between the two Christian communities that is working towards full reunification. Nevertheless, after the Second Vatican Council the Catholic Church has distanced itself from uniatism as an approach to finding lasting unity.

== Contemporary relations ==
Contemporary relations between the Catholic and Eastern Orthodox churches have been characterised by a push towards ecumenism and dialogue. The Second Vatican Council was instrumental in changing the Catholic churches pastoral approach to dealing with the Orthodox. Despite this new openness, however, many Orthodox remain hesitant, especially in light of recent developments and continued debate over topics such as the essence-energy distinction.

=== Second Vatican Council ===
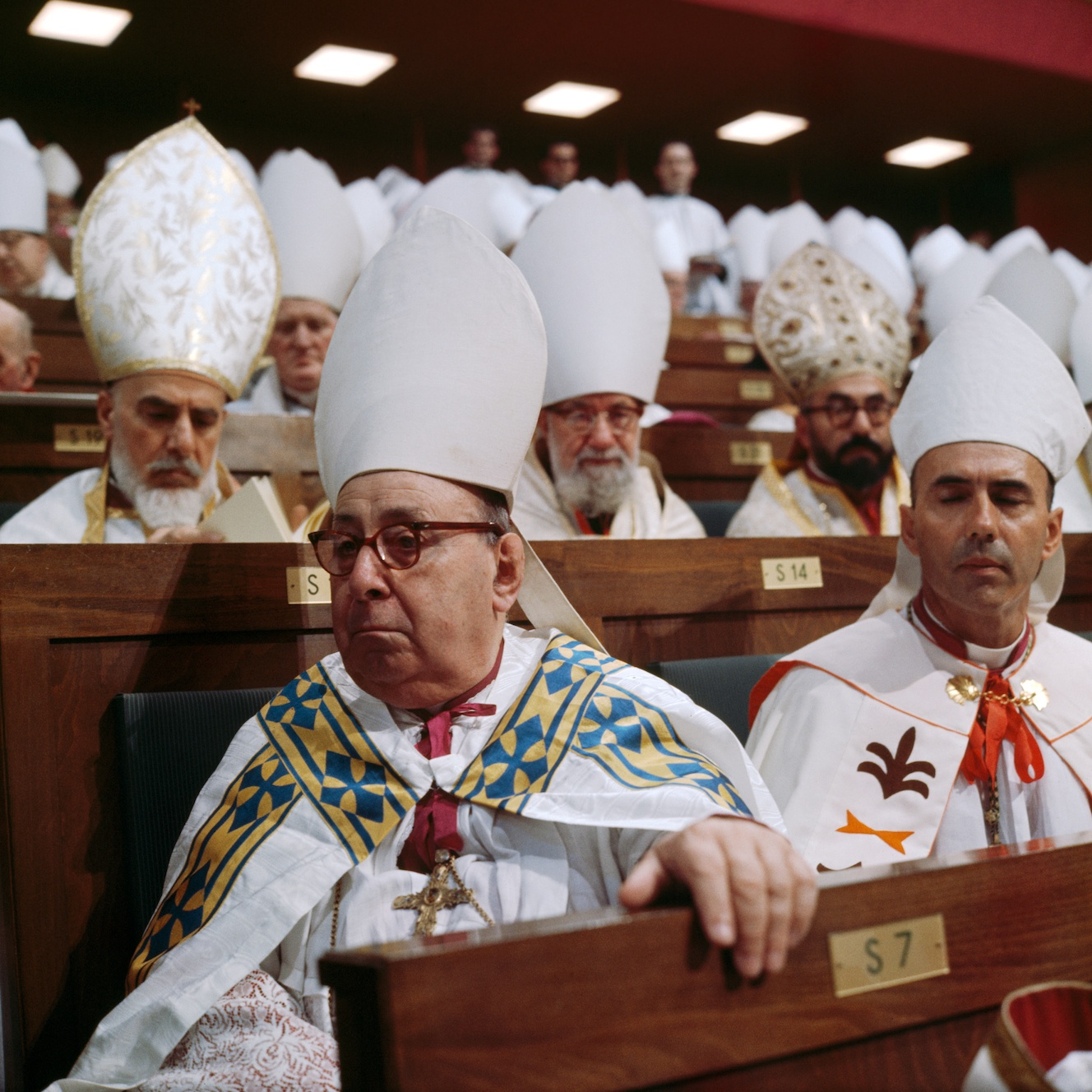
The Second Vatican Council

The Second Vatican Council was a watershed in terms of the Catholic Church's pastoral approach. Over two thousand bishops were called to Rome between 1962 and 1965 to discuss how the church would face the challenges of the modern world. The church, according to Peter A. Huff, largely redirected its concern from internal stability to external dialogue. Seventeen Orthodox churches sent observers to the council who participated in discussions, specifically on ecumenism between the two churches. One of the council's primary concerns was to bring about the unity of all Christians.

Significantly, at the close of the council Pope Paul VI and Orthodox Patriarch Athenagoras mutually lifted their respective excommunications in the Catholic–Orthodox Joint Declaration of 1965. This, however, was largely symbolic of intentions to eventually restore full communion between the churches.

=== Dialogue and ecumenism ===
The Vatican II Decree on Ecumenism has driven Catholic efforts to reach out to the Orthodox over the last 60 years. (Note: Unitatis redintegratio (Decree on Ecumenism): "But the Lord of Ages wisely and patiently follows out the plan of grace on our behalf, sinners that we are. In recent times more than ever before, He has been rousing divided Christians to remorse over their divisions and to a longing for unity. Everywhere large numbers have felt the impulse of this grace, and among our separated brethren also there increases from day to day the movement, fostered by the grace of the Holy Spirit, for the restoration of unity among all Christians. This movement toward unity is called "ecumenical."... The term "ecumenical movement" indicates the initiatives and activities planned and undertaken, according to the various needs of the Church and as opportunities offer, to promote Christian unity. These are: first, every effort to avoid expressions, judgments and actions which do not represent the condition of our separated brethren with truth and fairness and so make mutual relations with them more difficult; then, "dialogue" between competent experts from different Churches and Communities. At these meetings, which are organized in a religious spirit, each explains the teaching of his Communion in greater depth and brings out clearly its distinctive features. In such dialogue, everyone gains a truer knowledge and more just appreciation of the teaching and religious life of both Communions. In addition, the way is prepared for cooperation between them in the duties for the common good of humanity which are demanded by every Christian conscience; and, wherever this is allowed, there is prayer in common. Finally, all are led to examine their own faithfulness to Christ's will for the Church and accordingly to undertake with vigor the task of renewal and reform.") The dialogue that took place between 1963 and 1979 has been described as a "dialogue of charity". This transitioned into a "dialogue of doctrine" with reference to the history and tradition of the early Church. Consecutive popes have chosen to recite the Nicene Creed with Eastern Patriarchs according to the text prior to the addition of the Filioque clause. The Orthodox have engaged with the Vatican on several occasions over recent decades, significantly Patriarch Bartholomew I attending the Assisi Prayer Meeting.

The Joint Theological Commission was set up between the Holy See and fourteen autocephalous Orthodox churches. In 1980 the Commission first met in Rhodes where they released a joint preparatory document stating that a deeper understanding of the sacraments would help further dialogue.

Another issue that has been made clear is the disagreement surrounding the nature of the dispute. For many Catholics the primary issue is one of authority, which relates to ecclesiology. They do not regard the Orthodox as heretical but merely as schismatic, for they do not recognise Papal supremacy. Alternatively the Orthodox will often diagnose the problem as primarily theological, pointing to Catholic dogmatic teachings on the Immaculate Conception and Papal Infallibility as being heretical.

=== Recent developments ===
In 2018 the ecumenical effort was further complicated by tensions between the Russian Orthodox Church and Greek Orthodox Church, which resulted in the Ecumenical Patriarch establishing an independent Orthodox Church of Ukraine. Pew Research has shown that as of 2017 35% of Orthodox practitioners are in favor of communion with the Catholic Church. Support for Orthodox/Catholic unity was highest among Orthodox in Romania with 62% in support and lowest among Russian Orthodox with 17% support. Among Catholics in the countries polled, 38% supported unity compared to 30% opposed. Support for unity was highest among Ukrainian Catholics with 74% in favor and lowest among Lithuanian Catholics with 24% in favor.

== Bilateral relations of the Roman Catholic Church with autocephalous Eastern Orthodox churches ==
=== Relations between the Roman Catholic Church and Greek Orthodox Church of Alexandria ===
The Greek Orthodox Patriarchate of Alexandria and all Africa is actively involved in ecumenical dialogue with the Roman Catholic Church. In 1968, at the enthronement of the Patriarch Nicholas VI of Alexandria, the delegation of the Roman Catholic Church handed over to the Patriarchate of Alexandria a particle of the relics of Saint Mark, the founder of the Church of Alexandria. In 2013, a meeting between Pope Francis and Patriarch Theodore II of Alexandria took place in Rome. On April 28, 2017, Patriarch Theodore II in Cairo took part in a joint ecumenical prayer with Pope Francis, Coptic Pope Tawadros II and Patriarch Bartholomew of Constantinople.

== Vision for unity ==
=== Future prospects ===
The Catholic Church has expressed a deep desire to heal the schism in order that the church may "breathe with her two lungs". The Orthodox, however, continue to insist that the Bishop of Rome holds a primacy which is limited to one of honour. This is encapsulated in the phrase primus inter pares (Latin for "first among equals"). Given that the Catholic Church recognises more than just a distinction in honour there is clearly a need for one side to compromise on this matter. Currently there are no indications of a compromise of this sort in the near future.

Despite the enduring differences between the Catholic and Orthodox churches, some scholars hold that the main problem halting progress is behavioural and not doctrinal. Thus, Robert F. Taft, S.J. believed that the answer to the churches' problems is ecumenical scholarship which seeks understanding rather than confrontation.

== Bibliography ==
- Nichols, Aiden (2010). Rome and the Eastern Churches (2nd ed.). Ignatius Press.
- Cleenewerck, Laurent (2008). His Broken Body: Understanding and Healing the Schism between the Roman Catholic and Eastern Orthodox Churches. Euclid University Consortium Press.
- Borelli, John; Erickson, John H., eds. (1996). The Quest for Unity: Orthodox and Catholics in Dialogue: Documents of the Joint International Commission and Official Dialogues in the United States, 1965–1995. St. Vladimir's Seminary Press.
- Chryssavgis, John, ed. (2014). Dialogue of Love: Breaking the Silence of Centuries. Fordham University Press.
- Chadwick, Henry (2003). East and West: The Making of a Rift in the Church: From Apostolic Times until the Council of Florence. Oxford University Press.
