= Ecclesiastical differences between the Catholic Church and the Eastern Orthodox Church =

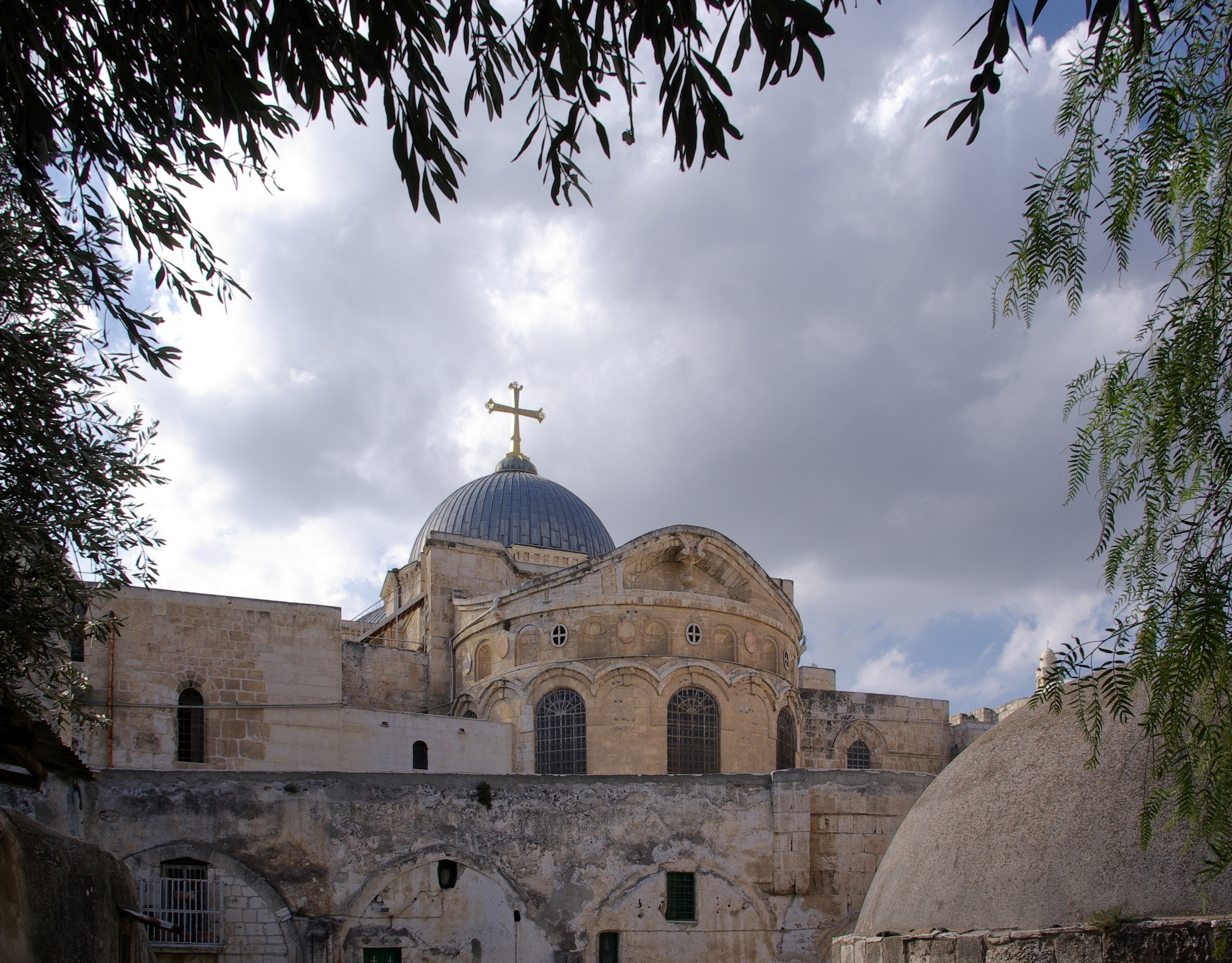
The Church of the Holy Sepulchre in Jerusalem – a centre of pilgrimage long shared and disputed between the Catholic, Eastern Orthodox, and Oriental Orthodox churches.

Several differences exist within the organizational structures and governance of the Catholic Church and the Eastern Orthodox Church. These are distinguished from theological differences which are differences in dogma and doctrine. A number of disagreements over matters of ecclesiology developed slowly between the Western and Eastern wings of the State church of the Roman Empire centered upon the cities of Rome (considered to have fallen in 476) and New Rome/Constantinople (also considered to have "fallen" in 1453) respectively. The disputes were a major factor in the formal East-West Schism between Pope Leo IX and Patriarch Michael I in 1054 and are largely still unresolved between the churches today.

== Papal authority ==
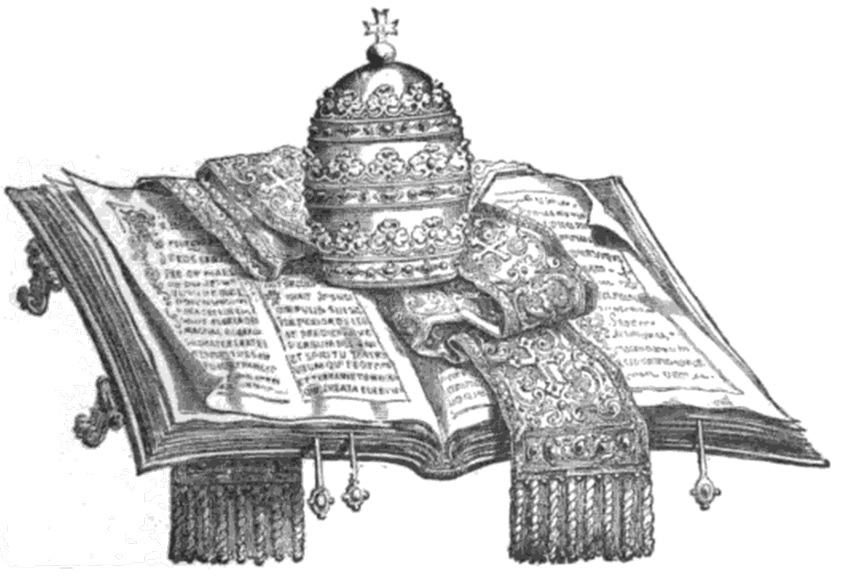
1881 illustration depicting papal infallibility

Many of the issues that currently separate the two churches are ecclesiastical. Principal among them is the meaning of papal primacy within any future unified church. The Orthodox insist that it should be a "primacy of honor", as in the ancient church and not a "primacy of authority", whereas the Catholic Church sees the pontiff's role as requiring for its exercise power and authority the exact form of which is open to discussion with other Christians.

The declaration of Ravenna in 2007 re-asserted these beliefs and re-stated the notion that the bishop of Rome is indeed the protos ("first" in Greek), although future discussions are to be held on the concrete ecclesiastical exercise of papal primacy. Hierarchs within the Russian Church have condemned the document and reassert that Papal authority as is held in the West is not historically valid. The Orthodox view of the Papacy would be Primus inter pares without power of jurisdiction.

== Canonical territory ==
A canonical territory is a geographical area seen as belonging to a particular patriarchate or autocephalous church as its own. The concept is found not only in the Eastern Orthodox Church, but also in the Catholic Church, and is mentioned extensively in the Code of Canons of the Eastern Churches.

The issue of canonical territory has proven to be a significant point of dispute in Russia, with the Moscow Patriarchate being opposed on one hand to the influence of the Patriarch of Constantinople in Ukraine, and on the other to perceived Catholic influence within Russia itself.

== Ecclesiological economy ==
A major point of difference is with the style of church government. The Orthodox Church has always maintained the position of collegiality of the bishops. The Orthodox Church has also emphasised 'economia', or a certain amount of flexibility in the rules depending upon the exigencies of a particular situation. The administrative structure of the Orthodox church is closer to a confederacy in structure, with no functioning centralization as a constant.

In the synods of the Orthodox Church, the highest authorities in each Church community are brought together. Unlike the pope in the Catholic Church, no central individual or figure has the absolute (and "infallible") last word on church doctrine and administration. In practice, this has sometimes led to divisions among Greek, Russian, Bulgarian and Ukrainian Orthodox churches, as no central authority can serve as a rallying point for various internal disputes.

However, in contrast with the picture presented by the Russian religious poet Aleksey Khomyakov more than a century earlier, the Catholic Church's Second Vatican Council reasserted the importance of collegiality, clarifying that "primatial authority is inseparable from collegiality and synodality" and that "the Bishop of Rome is a brother among brothers who are sacramentally all equal in the episcopate.

== Rejection of Eastern Catholic Churches ==
At a meeting in Balamand, Lebanon, in June 1993, the Joint International Commission for Theological Dialogue Between the Catholic Church and the Orthodox Church declared that these initiatives that "led to the union of certain communities with the See of Rome and brought with them, as a consequence, the breaking of communion with their Mother Churches of the East ... took place not without the interference of extra-ecclesial interests"; and that:

- What has been called "uniatism" "can no longer be accepted either as a method to be followed nor as a model of the unity our Churches are seeking".

At the same time, the Commission stated:

- Concerning the Eastern Catholic Churches, it is clear that they, as part of the Catholic Communion, have the right to exist and to act in response to the spiritual needs of their faithful.
- The Oriental Catholic Churches who have desired to re-establish full communion with the See of Rome and have remained faithful to it, have the rights and obligations which are connected with this communion.

== Apostolic succession and sacraments ==
Some Eastern Orthodox churches do not require baptism of a convert already baptized in the Catholic Church. Most Orthodox churches allow marriages between members of the Catholic Church and the Eastern Orthodox Church. For example, the Church of Greece would allow an Orthodox man to marry a Catholic bride in its church, providing the wife vows the children will be baptized Orthodox.

Because the Catholic Church respects their celebration of the Mass as a true sacrament, intercommunion with the Eastern Orthodox in "suitable circumstances and with Church authority" is both possible and encouraged.

The Catholic Church allows its clergy to administer the sacraments of Penance, the Eucharist and Anointing of the Sick to members of the Eastern Orthodox Church, if these spontaneously ask for the sacraments and are properly disposed. It also allows Catholics who cannot approach a Catholic minister to receive these three sacraments from clergy of the Eastern Orthodox Church, whenever necessity requires or a genuine spiritual advantage commends it, and provided the danger of error or indifferentism is avoided. Catholic canon law allows marriage between a Catholic and an Orthodox only if permission is obtained from the Catholic bishop. However Holy sacraments in the Catholic Church and Syrian Orthodox Church are treated as same and accepted each other as identified by Pope John Paul II, and Patriarch Ignatius Zakka I.

The Code of Canons of the Eastern Churches authorizes the local Catholic bishop to permit a Catholic priest, of whatever rite, to bless the marriage of Orthodox faithful who being unable without great difficulty to approach a priest of their own church, ask for this spontaneously. In exceptional circumstances Catholics may, in the absence of an authorized priest, marry before witnesses. If a priest who is not authorized for the celebration of the marriage is available, he should be called in, although the marriage is valid even without his presence. The Code of Canons of the Eastern Churches specifies that, in those exceptional circumstances, even a "non-Catholic" priest (and so not necessarily one belonging to an Eastern church) may be called in.

== See also ==
- Autocephaly
- Balamand declaration
- Catholic–Eastern Orthodox relations
- Eastern Christianity
- Eastern Orthodox Christian theology
- Eastern Orthodox opposition to papal supremacy
- Theological differences between the Catholic Church and the Eastern Orthodox Church
- Eastern Rite Catholicism
- Eastern Orthodox Church organization
- Quartodecimanism
- Ravenna Document
- Western Christianity
- Western Rite Orthodoxy
