= Differences between the Catholic Church and the Eastern Orthodox Church =

Differences between the Catholic Church and the Eastern Orthodox Church may refer to:

- Ecclesiastical differences between the Catholic Church and the Eastern Orthodox Church
- Theological differences between the Catholic Church and the Eastern Orthodox Church
