= Balamand Monastery =

Monastery in Koura District, Lebanon

Coordinates: 34°22′06″N 35°46′46″E

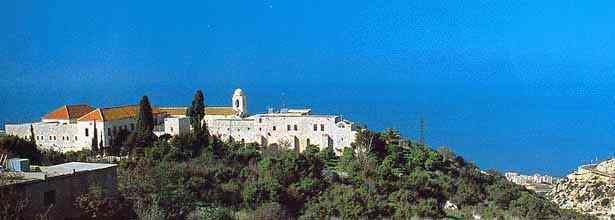
Balamand Monastery, known as the "Pearl of the East."

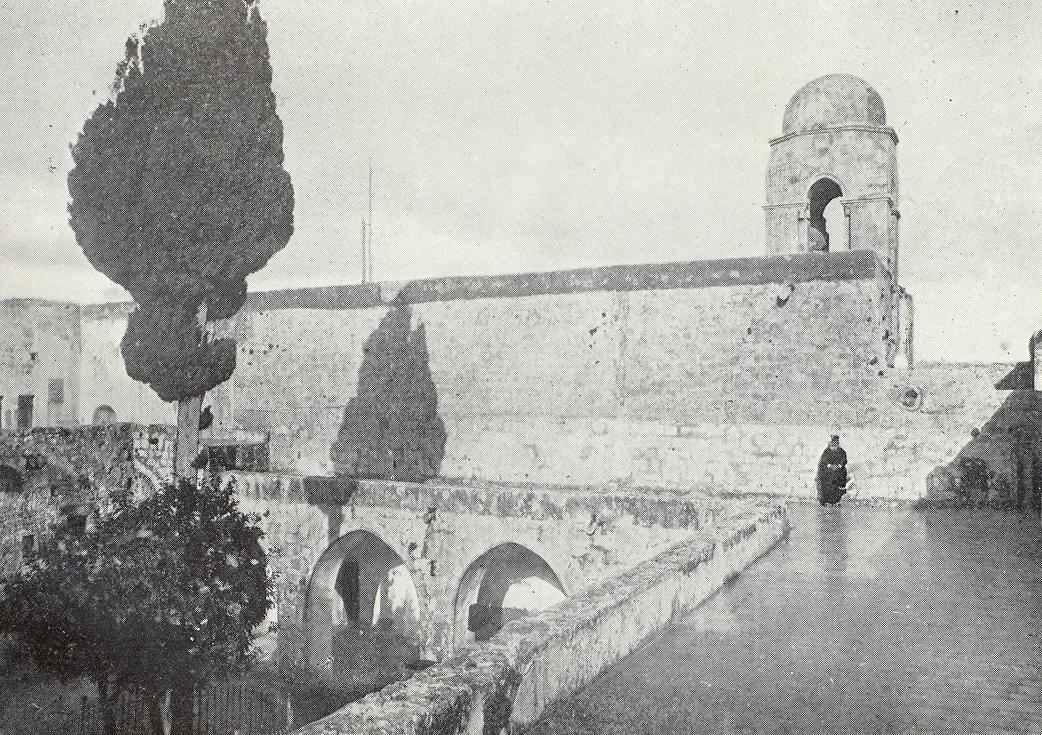
Balamand Monastery (1921)

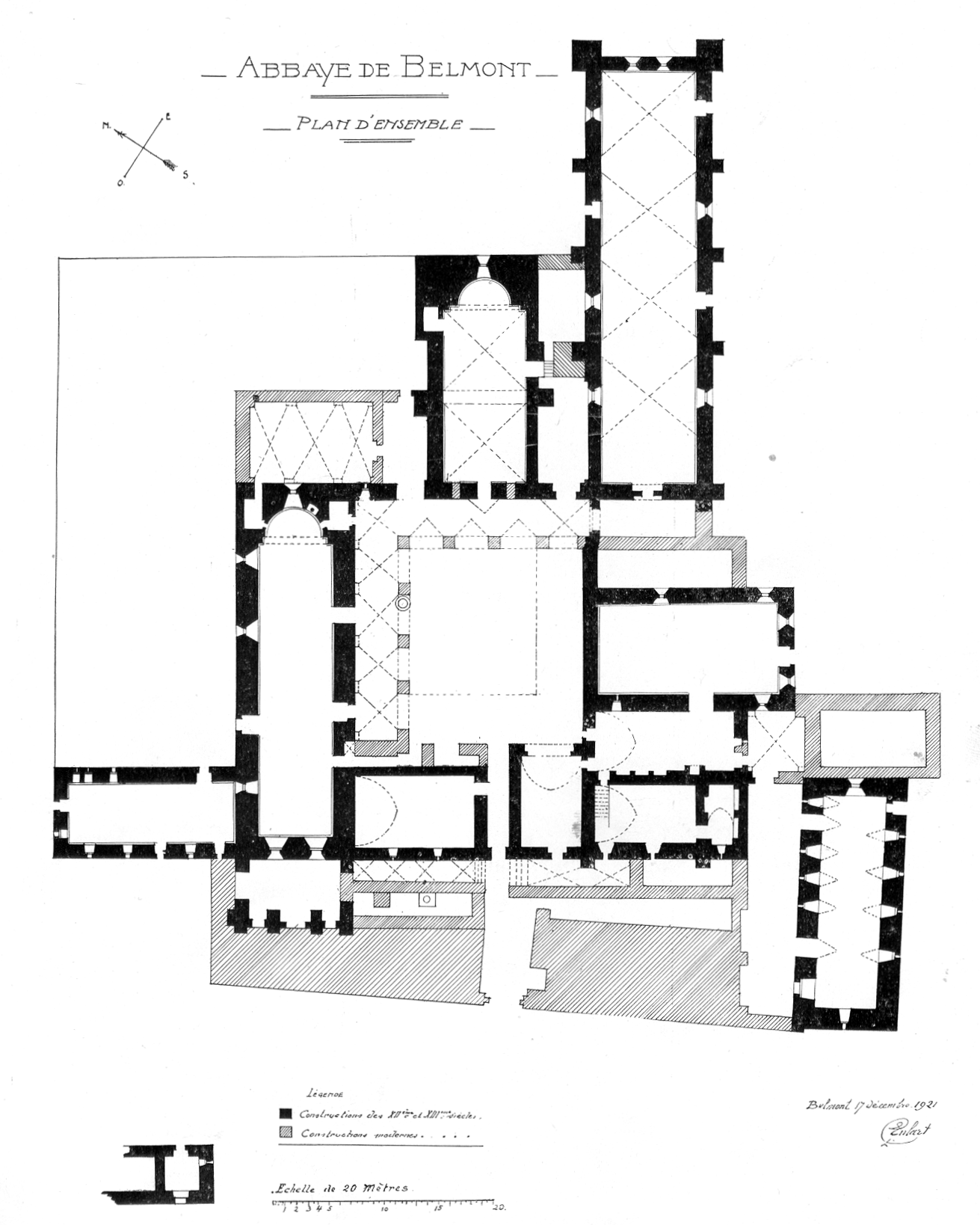
Balamand Monastery floor plan (1921)

The Balamand Monastery (historically called Belmont, Bellimontis ultra Mare, or Bellus-Mons), is a monastery for the Greek Orthodox Church of Antioch founded in 1157 in Balamand (Belmont), the Crusader County of Tripoli, now in the Koura District, in Northern Lebanon. It was originally started by Cistercian monks and maintained as such until the Mamluk conquest in 1289, then reestablished as monastery by Greek Orthodox monks in 1610, after a poorly documented period of three centuries.

On the grounds of the monastery has been established the University of Balamand, founded by the Orthodox Patriarch Ignatius IV of Antioch in 1988, though the university claims to be secular and a distinct institution.

== History ==
The Balamand Monastery, originally known to Crusaders as Belmont (“beautiful mountain”), was founded in 1157 by French Cistercian monks in the Crusader County of Tripoli (modern-day northern Lebanon). Constructed between 1157 and 1169, the abbey flourished for over a century. The monastery remained under Cistercian control until the Mamluk conquest of Tripoli in 1289. After this, the site was abandoned; archaeological surveys show little Mamluk-era occupation. However, occasional hermitic presence persisted in the late 15th century, as suggested by Syriac–Arabic manuscripts from around 1492.

In 1603, Greek Orthodox monks, led by Youwakim, metropolitan of Tripoli, and with support from local Muslim officials, officially restored the monastery. By 1610, it had been re‑endowed as a waqf and repopulated by a dozen monks, replanting vineyards, olive groves, and livestock. The monastery prospered thereafter, becoming renowned for its hospitality and continued religious life through the Ottoman period. The English traveler Henry Maundrell, who stayed there in 1697, noted about forty monks and praised their industriousness despite their simplicity.

In 1988, Patriarch Ignatius IV of Antioch founded the University of Balamand on and around the historic monastery lands. Recognizing the site's long-standing role as a scholarly and printing center in North Lebanon, he envisioned a secular yet culturally rooted institution promoting dialogue among Christians and Muslims.

== See also ==
- Balamand declaration
