= Balamand declaration =

1993 religious report

Uniatism, method of union of the past, and the present search for full communion (French: l'uniatisme, méthode d'union du passé, et la recherche actuelle de la pleine communion), also known as the Balamand declaration and the Balamand document, is a 1993 report written by the Joint International Commission for Theological Dialogue Between the Catholic Church and the Orthodox Church during its 7th plenary session at University of Balamand's Balamand School of Theology in Lebanon. (Note: The report contains unofficial suggestions of the commission, "until the competent organs of the Catholic Church and of the Orthodox Churches express their judgement in regard to it.") The report discusses ecclesiological principles and suggests practical rules for both the Catholic Church and the Eastern Orthodox Church to implement about improving relations by reciprocally avoiding interfering in each other's Churches and not using history in a polemical manner. According to Cardinal Edward Cassidy, the report contains three principles: that individuals have the freedom to follow their conscience, that Eastern Catholic Churches have the right to exist, and that uniatism is not the current method of full communion; and two conclusions: that the Catholic Church and the Eastern Orthodox churches are "sister churches" and that rebaptism should be avoided. The Eastern Catholics rejected the report "because it seemed to imply they should never have existed in the first place" while the Eastern Orthodox rejected it because it did not call for the abolition of the Eastern Catholic Churches. (Note: According to Aidan Nichols, in Rome and the Eastern Churches, in 1995, Ecumenical Patriarch Bartholomew I of Constantinople addressed John Paul II about the Eastern Catholic Churches "in words so extraordinary that the Vatican 'newspaper of record', L'Osservatore Romano, found it more judicious not to publish them." Bartholomew I rejected that the Eastern Catholic Churches were Churches but were irregular communities that should be subject to an Orthodox Church.)

== Content ==
The suggested ecclesiological principles include that the Eastern Catholic Churches of the Catholic Church should be included the theological dialogue. Monks from Mount Athos monasteries protested against this principle.

The central issue is exclusivity of the doctrine that there is no salvation outside the Church. Missionaries converted other Christians "so as 'to bring them back' to one's own Church. In order to legitimize this tendency, a source of proselytism, the Catholic Church developed the theological vision according to which she presented herself as the only one to whom salvation was entrusted. As a reaction, the Orthodox Church, in turn, came to accept the same vision according to which only in her could salvation be found. To assure the salvation of 'the separated brethren' it even happened that Christians were rebaptized and that certain requirements of the religious freedom of persons and of their act of faith were forgotten." The principle that "the inviolable freedom of persons and their obligation to follow the requirements of their conscience," is foundational, according to Cassidy, "and justifies both the personal choice to adhere to the Catholic Church or to the Orthodox Church, and offers the possibility of returning to the Catholic Church for those communities which in 1945–49 had been forced to convert by Communist regimes to become part of the Orthodox Church," as happened in the Ukrainian Soviet Socialist Republic, the Socialist Republic of Romania and the Czechoslovak Socialist Republic.

The report notes that a solution to the problems depends upon "a will to pardon" and to "overcome reciprocal lack of understanding" with a goal of restoring "the full communion which existed for more than a thousand years between our Churches." While the Catholic Church "no longer aims at proselytizing among the Orthodox." The report acknowledges that historically relations between the Eastern Orthodox Churches and the Eastern Catholic Churches were "marked by persecutions and sufferings" and that no one should "accuse or disparage the other Church."

Churches need to respect all "who suffered, confessed their faith, witnessed their fidelity to the Church, and, in general, towards all Christians, without discrimination, who underwent persecutions." The report suggests that by relinquishing "everything that can foment division, contempt and hatred between the churches" a resolution to "the extremely complex situation that has been created in Eastern Europe" can be implemented.

According to the report, both churches need to "scrupulously respect the religious liberty of the faithful" which "requires that, particularly in situations of conflict, the faithful are able to express their opinion and to decide without pressure from outside if they wish to be in communion either with the Orthodox Church or with the Catholic Church."

A "necessary respect for christian freedom" requires the exclusion of "every form of pressure" and a "respect for consciences" should guide pastoral concerns in both the Eastern Orthodox Church and the Catholic Church. Open dialogue is necessary. "If agreement cannot be reached on the local level, the question should be brought to mixed commissions established by higher authorities."

Condemning group violence against communities of a sister church lessens suspicion, the report paraphrased Pope John Paul II, that violence and pressure needs to "be absolutely avoided in order that freedom of conscience be respected. It is the task of those in charge of communities to assist their faithful to deepen their loyalty towards their own Church and towards its traditions and to teach them to avoid not only violence, be that physical or verbal, but also all that could lead to contempt for other Christians and to a counter-witness, completely ignoring the work of salvation which is reconciliation in Christ." (Note: The report showed how some Western "universal values of freedom of conscience could offend the Orthodox who are less concerned by the rights of the individual than the rights of the community and tradition." For example, the phrase "the right of each person to join the religion of his choice" was removed in the final version of paragraph 27 in the report.)

"The use of violence to occupy a place of worship contradicts" faith in sacramental reality and "the evangelical ethos requires that statements or manifestations which are likely to perpetuate a state of conflict and hinder the dialogue be avoided." Clergy "have the duty before God to respect the authority which the Holy Spirit has given to the bishops and priests of the other Church and for that reason to avoid interfering in the spiritual life of the faithful of that Church. When cooperation becomes necessary for the good of the faithful, it is then required that those responsible to an agreement among themselves, establish for this mutual assistance clear principles which are known to all, and act subsequently with frankness, clarity, and with respect for the sacramental discipline of the other Church." New Catholic pastoral projects, "which imply the creation of new structures in regions which traditionally form part of the jurisdiction of the Orthodox Church," should not be established without consulting the Orthodox bishops in the same geographical area to avoid the risk of rivalry and conflict. Instead of intervention by civil authorities, dialogue about "the complexity of present realities and local circumstances" between churches or local communities should be used to resolve problems such as "the possession or return of ecclesiastical property."

Avoiding "the use of history in a polemical manner [...] will lead to an awareness that faults leading to separation belong to both sides, leaving deep wounds on each side." Clergy should be educated about "the apostolic succession of the other Church and the authenticity of its sacramental life" as should "a correct and comprehensive knowledge of history aiming at a historiography of the two Churches which is in agreement and even may be common." Providing "objective news to the mass-media especially to the religious press in order to avoid tendentious and misleading information" should be a common task to evangelize a secularized world.

"By excluding [...] all proselytism and all desire for expansion by Catholics at the expense of the Orthodox Church, the commission hopes that it has overcome the obstacles which impelled certain autocephalous Churches to suspend their participation in the theological dialogue and that the Orthodox Church will" continue the theological work of the commission.

== Participants ==
Representatives of the Catholic Church and nine autocephalous and autonomous Eastern Orthodox Churches participated: Ecumenical Patriarchate of Constantinople (including Orthodox Church of Finland), Greek Orthodox Church of Alexandria, Greek Orthodox Church of Antioch, Russian Orthodox Church, Romanian Orthodox Church, Cypriot Orthodox Church, Polish Orthodox Church, Albanian Orthodox Church.

Representatives of the Church of Greece, the Greek Orthodox Church of Jerusalem, the Serbian Orthodox Church, the Bulgarian Orthodox Church, the Georgian Orthodox Church, the Czech and Slovak Orthodox Church and Orthodox Church of America did not participate.

== See also ==
- Eastern Christianity § Rejection of Uniatism
- Personal ordinariates, 21st century organizations for groups with Anglican patrimony to enter into full communion with the Catholic Church
- Ravenna Document
- Anti-religious campaign of Communist Romania
- Persecution of Christians in the Eastern Bloc
- Persecution of Christians in the Soviet Union
- Persecutions of the Catholic Church and Pius XII
