= Joint International Commission for Theological Dialogue Between the Catholic Church and the Orthodox Church =

Catholic–Eastern Orthodox ecumenism

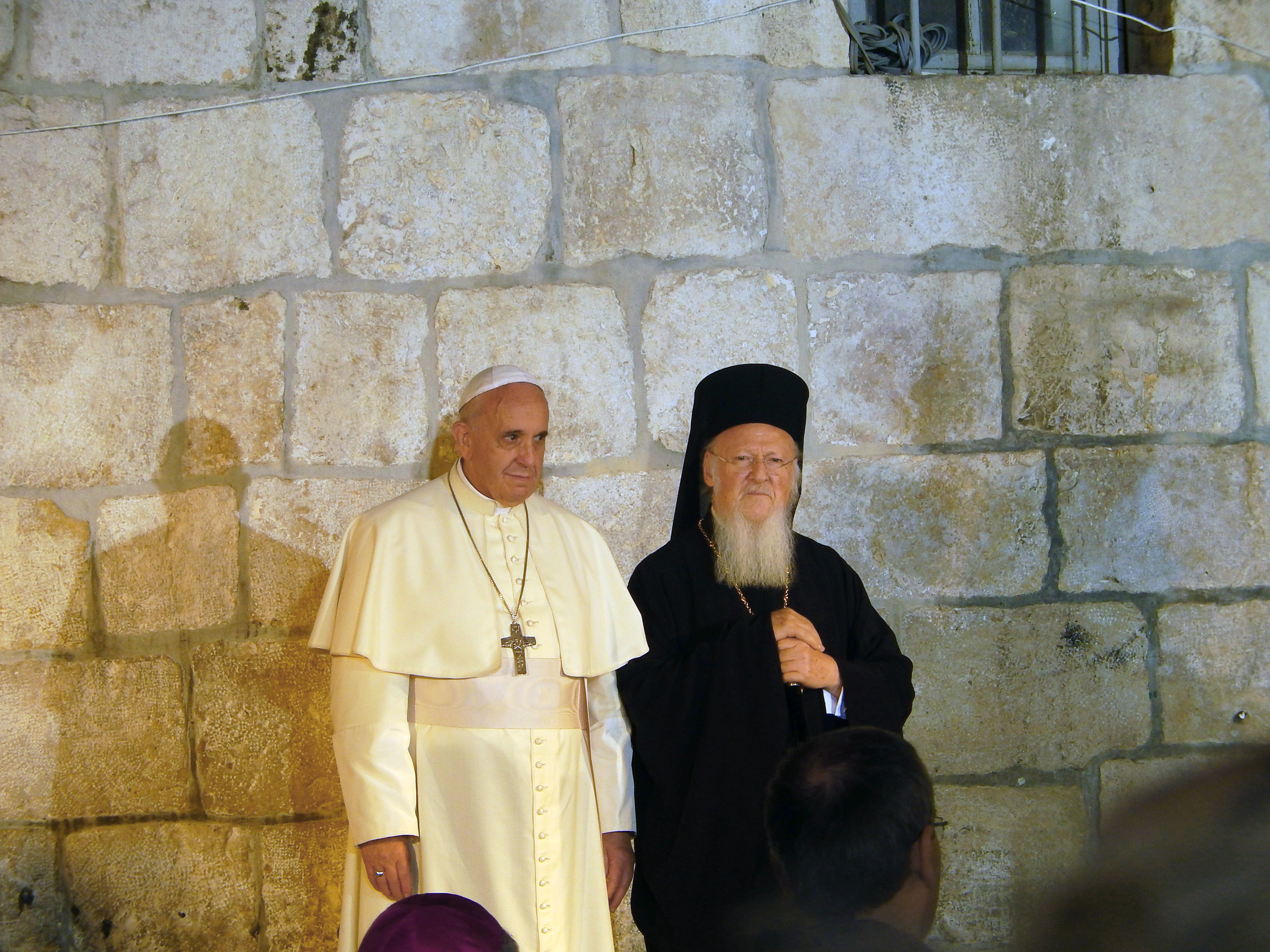
Pope Francis and Patriarch Bartholomew

The Joint International Commission for Theological Dialogue Between the Catholic Church and the Eastern Orthodox Church was established by the Holy See and 14 autocephalous Orthodox churches.

== Plenary sessions ==
The commission's first ten years of work reflected the growing consensus between the two communions and saw the publication of three agreed statements on such issues as the relationship between the Trinity, the Church and Eucharist; the sacraments of initiation and the connection between common faith and sacramental communion; and the theology of the ordained ministry.

The commission has held the following plenary sessions:

- 1st Patmos & Rhodes, Greece (1980) "The Mystery of the Church and the Eucharist in the Light of the Mystery of the Holy Trinity"
- 2nd Munich, Germany (June 30 to July 6, 1982) "The Mystery of the Church and the Eucharist in the Light of the Mystery of the Holy Trinity"
- 3rd Crete, Greece (1984) "Faith, Sacraments and Unity of the Church"
- 4th Bari, Italy (June 9–16, 1987) "Faith, Sacraments and the Unity of the Church"
- 5th Valamo, Finland (June 19–27, 1988) "The Sacrament of Order in the Sacramental Structure of the Church, with Particular Reference to the Importance of the Apostolic Succession for the Sanctification and Unity of the People of God"
- 6th Freising, Germany (1990) "Uniatism"
- 7th Balamand, Lebanon (June 17–24, 1993) "Uniatism: Method of Union of the Past, and Present Search for Full Communion"
- 8th Emmitsburg, Maryland, US (July 9–19, 2000)"Ecclesiological and Canonical Implications of Uniatism"
- 9th Belgrade, Serbia (2006) "The Ecclesiological and Canonical Consequences of the Sacramental Nature of the Church; Conciliarity and Authority in the Church at Three Levels of Ecclesial Life: Local, Regional and Universal"
- 10th Ravenna, Italy (October 8–14, 2007)"The Ecclesiological and Canonical Consequences of the Sacramental Nature of the Church – Ecclesial Communion, Conciliarity and Authority"
- 11th Paphos, Cyprus (2009) "The Role of the Bishop of Rome in the Communion of the Church in the First Millennium"
- 12th Vienna, Austria (2010) "The Role of the Bishop of Rome in the Communion of the Church in the First Millennium"
- 13th Amman, Jordan (2014) "Primacy and synodality in the Church"
- 14th Chieti, Italy (2016) "Primacy and synodality in the Church"
- 15th Alexandria, Egypt (2023) "Primacy and Synodality in the Second Millenium and Today"

== Seventh Plenary Session (Balamand, Lebanon) ==
The seventh plenary session took place from June 17 to 24, 1993. According to the Communique, also known as the Balamand declaration, the dissolution of the Soviet Union and the attendant collapse of the Warsaw Pact in Central and Eastern Europe brought about "profound changes... involving the rebirth of religious liberty and the resumption of open pastoral activity by the Oriental Catholic Churches". The session declared that these changes had "made these questions the touchstone of the quality of the relations between the Catholic and the Orthodox Churches." In particular, the question of Uniatism became the focus of attention.

== Eighth Plenary Session (Emmitsburg, United States) ==
The eighth plenary session took place from July 9 to 19, 2000 and centered on the theme of the "Ecclesiological and Canonical Implications of Uniatism"

== Ninth Plenary Session (Belgrade, Serbia) ==
The ninth plenary session of the commission was held from 18 September to 25 September 2006 in Belgrade, Serbia.

The theme discussed was "Conciliarity and Authority in the Church". Following the session, Pope Benedict XVI visited Patriarch Bartholomew at Phanar on 30 November 2006.

== Tenth Plenary Session (Ravenna, Italy) ==
The tenth meeting took place in Ravenna, Italy from October 8 to 14, 2007.

== See also ==
- Eastern Orthodox – Roman Catholic ecclesiastical differences
- Eastern Orthodox – Roman Catholic theological differences
- Pontifical Council for Promoting Christian Unity
