= Theological differences between the Catholic Church and the Eastern Orthodox Church =

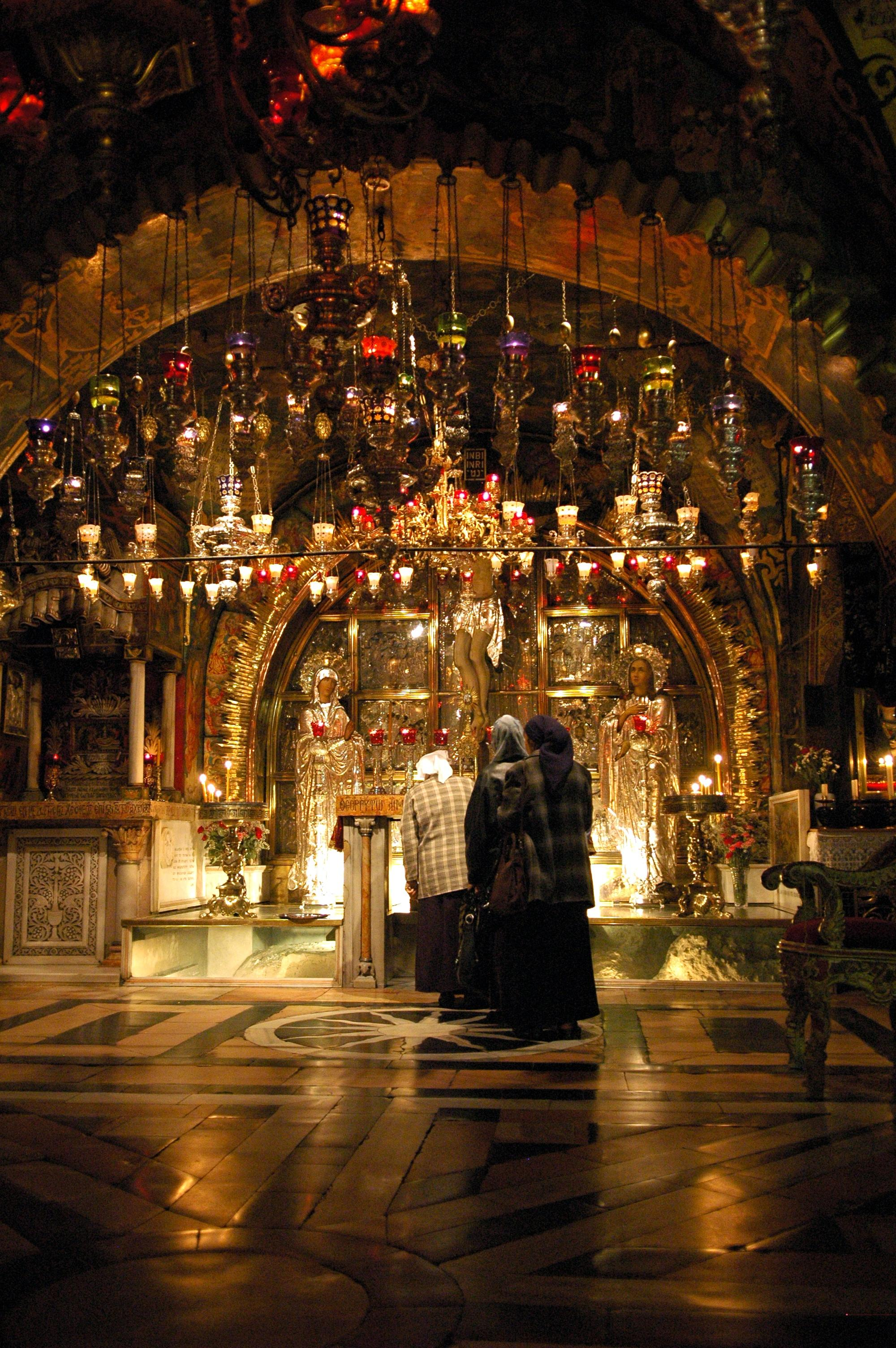
The Church of the Holy Sepulchre in Jerusalem – a centre of Christian pilgrimage long shared and disputed among the Eastern Orthodox, Oriental Orthodox, and Catholic Churches.

The Catholic Church and the Eastern Orthodox Church have been in a state of official schism from one another since the East–West Schism of 1054. This schism was caused by historical and linguistic differences, and the ensuing theological differences between the Western and Eastern churches.

The main theological differences with the Catholic Church are the papal primacy and the filioque clause. In spirituality, the tenability of neo-Palamism's essence-energy distinction and of the experiential vision of God as attained in theoria and theosis are actively debated.

Although the 21st century saw a growth of anti-Western sentiments with the rise of neo-Palamism, "the future of East–West rapprochement appears to be overcoming the modern polemics of neo-scholasticism and neo-Palamism". Since the Second Vatican Council, the Catholic Church has generally taken the approach that the schism is primarily ecclesiological in nature, that the doctrinal teachings of the Eastern Orthodox churches are generally sound, and that "the vision of the full communion to be sought is that of unity in legitimate diversity" as before the division.

== Areas of doctrinal agreement ==
Both churches accept the decisions of the first seven ecumenical councils of the state Roman church. These are:

- The First Council of Nicaea
- The First Council of Constantinople
- The First Council of Ephesus
- The Council of Chalcedon
- The Second Council of Constantinople
- The Third Council of Constantinople
- The Second Council of Nicaea

There is therefore doctrinal agreement on:

- The divine and human natures of Jesus
- Apostolic succession
- The threefold ministry of bishops, priests and deacons
- The broad structure of the visible church
- The sinless life of the Blessed Virgin Mary and the honour due to her as Theotokos
- Invocation of the saints
- Acceptance of the seven sacraments
- Confession to a priest
- Use of icons in worship
- Solemn celebration of the Eucharist and affirmation of its sacrificial nature as identical with the sacrifice of Christ
- The Eucharistic bread and wine becoming the Body and Blood of Jesus Christ

Both churches reject many Protestant doctrines; some important examples are the teachings of salvation through faith alone and sola scriptura.

== East–West schism ==
Changes in extent of the Empire ruled from Constantinople. 476 End of the Western Empire; 550 Conquests of Justinian I; 717 Accession of Leo the Isaurian; 867 Accession of Basil I; 1025 Death of Basil II; 1095 Eve of the First Crusade; 1170 Under Manuel I; 1270 Under Michael VIII Palaiologos; 1400 Before the fall of Constantinople

The Catholic Church and the Eastern Orthodox Church have been in a state of official schism from one another since the East–West schism of 1054. This schism was caused by historical and language differences, and the ensuing theological differences between the Western and Eastern churches.

The Byzantine Empire permanently withdrew from the City of Rome in 751, thus ending the Byzantine Papacy. The subsequent mutual alienation of the Greek-speaking East and the Latin-speaking West led to increasing ignorance of the theological and ecclesiological developments of each tradition.

The Eastern Church and the Western Church used respectively Greek and Latin as their media of communication. Translations did not always correspond exactly. This also led to misunderstandings.

== Papal primacy ==
Papal primacy, also known as the "primacy of the Bishop of Rome," is an ecclesiastical doctrine concerning the respect and authority that is due to the pope from other bishops and their episcopal sees.

In the Eastern Orthodox Church, some understand the primacy of the Bishop of Rome to be merely one of greater honour, regarding him as primus inter pares ("first among equals"), without effective power over other churches. A prominent 20th-century Eastern Orthodox Christian theologian, Fr. Alexander Schmemann, envisioned a primacy that sums up rather than rules over: "Primacy is power, but as power it is not different from the power of a bishop in each church. It is not a higher power but indeed the same power, only expressed, manifested, and realized by one."

The Catholic Church attributes to the primacy of the Pope "full, supreme, and universal power over the whole Church, a power which he can always exercise unhindered," with a power that it attributes also to the entire body of the bishops united with the pope. The power that it attributes to the pope's primatial authority has limitations that are official, legal, dogmatic, and practical.

In the Ravenna Document, issued in 2007, representatives of the Eastern Orthodox Church and the Catholic Church jointly stated that both East and West accept the fact of the Bishop of Rome's primacy at the universal level, but that differences of understanding exist about how the primacy is to be exercised and about its scriptural and theological foundations.

== Filioque ==
Differences over this doctrine and the question of papal primacy have been and remain primary causes of schism between the Eastern Orthodox and Western churches. The term has been an ongoing source of conflict between Eastern Christianity and Western Christianity, contributing, in major part, to the East–West Schism of 1054 and proving to be an obstacle to attempts to reunify the two sides.

=== The Filioque clause ===
Filioque (literally "and [from] the Son" (Note: "filioque, n". Oxford English Dictionary (online ed.). Oxford University Press. (Subscription or participating institution membership required.))) is a Latin term added to the Niceno-Constantinopolitan Creed (commonly known as the Nicene Creed), which is absent in the original Greek version. The Latin term Filioque is translated into the English clause "and the Son" in that creed:

I believe in the Holy Spirit, the Lord, the giver of life,
who proceeds from the Father ⟨and the Son⟩.
Who with the Father and the Son is adored and glorified.

or in Latin:

Et in Spiritum Sanctum, Dominium et vivificantem:
qui ex Patre ⟨Filioque⟩ procedit
Qui cum Patre, et Filio simul adoratur et cum glorificatur

=== Inclusion and rejection ===
The Filioque was accepted by the popes only in 1014 and is rejected by the Eastern Orthodox Church, Oriental Orthodox Churches and Church of the East. (Note: The doctrine expressed by the Filioque is accepted by the Catholic Church, by Anglicanism and by Protestant churches in general. Christians of these groups generally include it when reciting the Nicene Creed. Nonetheless, these groups recognize that Filioque is not part of the original text established at the First Council of Constantinople in 381 and they do not demand that others too should use it when saying the Creed, including in the Latin liturgical rites of the Latin Church. the Catholic Church does not add the phrase corresponding to Filioque (καὶ τοῦ Υἱοῦ) to the Greek text of the Creed, where it would be associated with the verb ἐκπορεύεσθαι, but adds it in Latin, where it is associated with the verb procedere, a word of broader meaning than ἐκπορεύεσθαι, and in languages, such as English, in which the verb with which it is associated also has a broader meaning than ἐκπορεύεσθαι. Pope John Paul II has recited the Nicene Creed several times with patriarchs of the Eastern Orthodox Church in Greek according to the original text.) first appearing in the 6th century though some scholars claim it is predated by a Nestorian recension dating to 410.

=== Consequences ===
Whether that term Filioque is included, as well as how it is translated and understood, can have important implications for how one understands the central Christian doctrine of the Holy Trinity. For some, the term implies a serious underestimation of the Father's role in the Trinity; for others, denial of what it expresses implies a serious underestimation of the role of the Son in the Trinity. Over time, the term became a symbol of conflict between Eastern Christianity and Western Christianity, although there have been attempts at resolving the conflict. Among the early attempts at harmonization are the works of Maximus the Confessor, who notably was canonised independently by both the Eastern and Western churches.

=== Possible linguistic resolution ===
In 1995, the Pontifical Council for Promoting Christian Unity (PCPCU) pointed out that the Filioque conundrum may be a problem of language, rather than a problem of theology. The word ἐκπορεύεσθαι in Greek indicates a primary cause or an ultimate cause; while the Latin word procedere indicates a procession but not from an ultimate cause. The Latin version may be more accurately retranslated into Greek as προϊέναι, rather than ἐκπορεύεσθαι. Metropolitan John Zizioulas declared that PCPCU position shows positive signs of reconciliation for the Filioque issue between the Eastern and Western churches.

== Sacraments ==
With regard to the Eucharist, both the Orthodox and Catholic churches believe in the real presence but differ on transubstantiation. The Orthodox Church holds that it is not the words of institution that change the substance into the Body and Blood, as is done in the Western liturgical rites, but instead, the epiclesis, which was not in the Roman Rite until 1969. Communion bread also varies between the Catholic and Orthodox churches, with the Orthodox Church and some Eastern Catholics using leavened bread while Roman Catholic Church uses unleavened bread.

Regarding the sacrament of holy orders, in the Orthodox married men can be ordained but, if they become widowed, they cannot remarry. Bishops are chosen from the monks (the monks are all celibate). In this, the Orthodox Church is closer to Catholics of oriental rites. In the Catholic Church, however, with the exception of the Eastern liturgical rites, priests maintain celibacy.

The age of confirmation and holy communion also varies between Catholics and Orthodox; Orthodox infants receive chrismation and holy communion immediately after baptism, while Catholic children receive their first communion and confirmation from the age of 7.

== Neo-Palamism: theoria and hesychasm ==
=== Neo-Palamism ===
The 20th century saw the rise of neo-Palamism, c.q. "Neo-Orthodox Movement," in the Eastern Orthodox churches. According to this point of view, which arose in defense of the Palamite distinction between essence and energeia, Western theology is dominated by rational philosophy, while Orthodox theology is based on the experiential vision of God and the highest truth. According to neo-Palamism, this is a main division between East and West.

Neo-Palamism has its roots in the Hesychast controversy or Palamite controversy (14th century), in which Gregory Palamas provided a theological justification for the centuries-old Orthodox practice of hesychasm. The hesychast controversy lead to a further distinction between East and West, with Palamite doctrine being accepted as orthodox in the Fifth Council of Constantinople, giving a prominent place to the contemplative practice and theology in the Eastern Orthodox Church. The publication in 1782 of the Philokalia, which lead to a revival of hesychasm, was accepted in particular by the Slav Orthodox churches. Together with the importance attached to it in the 20th century by the Paris school of Orthodox theology, it has "led to hesychasm's becoming definitive for modern Orthodox theology as never before," with its Palamite Essence–energies distinction.

=== Rational and mystical theology ===
According to these modern Eastern Orthodox theologians, Western theology depends too much on kataphatic theology. According to Steenberg, Eastern theologians assert that Christianity in essence is apodictic truth, in contrast to the dialectic, dianoia, or rationalised knowledge which is the arrived at truth by way of philosophical speculation.

While Thomas Aquinas argued that kataphatic and apophatic theology need to balance each other, Vladimir Lossky argued, based on his reading of Dionysius the Areopagite and Maximus the Confessor, that positive theology is always inferior to negative theology. According to Lossky mysticism, c.q. gnosiology, is the expression of dogmatic theology par excellence, while positive theology is a step along the way to the superior knowledge attained by negation. According to Lossky, the difference in East and West is due to the Catholic Church's use of pagan (Neoplatonist & Aristotelian) metaphysical philosophy, and its outgrowth, scholasticism, rather than the mystical, actual experience of God called theoria, to validate the theological dogmas of Catholic Christianity. Lossky argues that therefore the Eastern Orthodox and Catholics have become "different men," stating that "Revelation sets an abyss between the truth which it declares and the truths which can be discovered by philosophical speculation."

Lossky had a strong influence on 20th century Eastern Orthodox theology, and influenced John Romanides, himself also an influential theologian on his own. Romanides saw a strong dichotomy between Eastern Orthodox and Western views, arguing that the influence of the Franks, and Western acceptance of Augustine's theology, is the starting point of Western rational theology, and the dichotomy between East and West. (Note: According to Romanides, both Saint Thomas Aquinas' Aristotelianism and Saint Augustine's Neoplatonism mislead and dominated Western theology. According to Romanides, Augustine did not have theoria, and many of his theological conclusions are not based on a personal experience of God, but on philosophical or logical speculation and conjecture. Romanides therefore reveres Augustine as a saint, but says he does not qualify as a theologian in the Eastern Orthodox church. According to John Romanides the Catholic Church, starting with Augustine, has removed the mystical experience (revelation) of God (theoria) from Christianity, and replaced it with the conceptualization of revelation through the philosophical speculation of metaphysics. Romanides does not consider the metaphysics of Augustine to be Orthodox but pagan mysticism. According to John Romanides, Augustinian theology is generally ignored in the Eastern Orthodox church. According to John Romanides and George Papademetriou, some of Augustine's teachings, including his Platonic mysticism, has actually been condemned within the Eastern Orthodox condemnation of Barlaam of Calabria, at the Hesychast or Fifth Council of Constantinople 1351. (Note: This claim is made by Romanides in the title of his Augustine's Teachings Which Were Condemned as Those of Barlaam the Calabrian by the Ninth Ecumenical Council of 1351.))

This same sentiment was also expressed by the early Slavophile movements (19th century) in the works of Ivan Kireevsky and Aleksey Khomyakov. The Slavophiles sought reconciliation with all various forms of Christianity, as can be seen in the works of its most famous proponent Vladimir Solovyov.

=== Hesychasm ===
Hesychasm, "to keep stillness," is a mystical tradition of contemplative prayer in the Eastern Orthodox Church, which already existed in the fourth century AD with the Desert Fathers. Its aim is theosis, deification obtained through the practice of contemplative prayer, the first stage of theoria, leading to the "vision of God". (Note: Theosis has also been referred to as "glorification", "union with God", "becoming god by Grace", "self-realization", "the acquisition of the Holy Spirit", "experience of the uncreated light".) It consists of three stages, namely catharsis, theoria, and completion of deification, c.q. theosis.

The knowledge of God is attained by theoria, "the vision of God." (Note: In classical Greek philosophy, theoria was the "intellectual vision of truth," that is, an intuitive or comprehensive understanding and vision, as opposed to a mere rational and analytical understanding. Until the sixth century the practice of what is now called mysticism was referred to by the term contemplatio, c.q. theoria. According to Johnson, "[b]oth contemplation and mysticism speak of the eye of love which is looking at, gazing at, aware of divine realities." Under the influence of Pseudo-Dionysius the Areopagite the mystical theology came to denote the investigation of the allegorical truth of the Bible, and "the spiritual awareness of the ineffable Absolute beyond the theology of divine names." Theoria enabled the Fathers to perceive depths of meaning in the biblical writings that escape a purely scientific or empirical approach to interpretation. The Antiochene Fathers, in particular, saw in every passage of Scripture a double meaning, both literal and spiritual. (Note: The Antiochene use of theoria respected the literal meaning of Old Testament texts, while discerning in it a typological or spiritual sense, revealing in the things narrated "the face of Christ in the Old Testament". According to Beck, for Clement and other Alexandrians the word theōria denoted the spiritual sense of a passage of Scripture as revealed by allegory, and they treated it as virtually synonymous with allēgoria.) (Note: As Frances Margaret Young notes, "Best translated in this context as a type of "insight", theoria was the act of perceiving in the wording and "story" of Scripture a moral and spiritual meaning," and may be regarded as a form of allegory, In Hesychasm, theoria is obtained by contemplative prayer, the ceaseless and mindfull repetition of the Jesus Prayer.)) This is also referred to as experiencing the uncreated light of God, the light of Tabor of Christ's Transfiguration as was seen by the apostles at Mount Tabor.

=== Hesychast controversy ===
The Hesychast controversy was a theological dispute in the Byzantine Empire during the 14th century between supporters and opponents of Gregory Palamas. Gregory Palamas, bishop of Thessaloniki (1296–1359) provided a theological justification for the practice of hesychasm. Palamas stated that there is a distinction between the essence (ousia) and the energies (energeia) of God. While God in his essence is unknowable and indeterminable, the vision of God can be attained when his energy is seen with the eyes as the Uncreated Light. Palamas formulated his ideas on this distinction as part of his defense of the Athonite monastic practice of hesychasmos against the charge of heresy brought by the humanist scholar and theologian Barlaam of Calabria.

Eastern Orthodox theologians generally regard this distinction as a real distinction, and not just a conceptual distinction. Historically, Western Christian thought has tended to reject the essence-energies distinction as real in the case of God, characterizing the view as a heretical introduction of an unacceptable division in the Trinity opposed to divine simplicity espoused in the First Council of Nicaea and suggestive of polytheism.

=== Catholic views on Hesychasm ===
The later 20th century saw a change in the attitude of Catholic theologians to Palamas. While some Western theologians see the theology of Palamas as introducing an inadmissible division within God, others have incorporated his theology into their own thinking, maintaining that there is no conflict between his teaching and Catholic thought.

Sergey S. Horujy states that "hesychast studies may provide fresh look at some old interconfessional divisions, disclosing unexpected points of resemblance", and Jeffrey D. Finch says that "the future of East-West rapprochement appears to be overcoming the modern polemics of neo-scholasticism and neo-Palamism".

Pope John Paul II repeatedly emphasized his respect for eastern theology as an enrichment for the whole church. While from a Catholic viewpoint there have been tensions concerning some developments of the practice of hesychasm, the Pope said, there is no denying the goodness of the intention that inspired its defence.

== Future directions ==
Jeffrey D. Finch claims that "the future of East–West rapprochement appears to be overcoming the modern polemics of neo-scholasticism and neo-Palamism".

The Catholic Church considers that the differences between Eastern and Western theology are complementary rather than contradictory, as stated in the decree Unitatis redintegratio of the Second Vatican Council, which declared:

In the study of revelation East and West have followed different methods, and have developed differently their understanding and confession of God's truth. It is hardly surprising, then, if from time to time one tradition has come nearer to a full appreciation of some aspects of a mystery of revelation than the other, or has expressed it to better advantage. In such cases, these various theological expressions are to be considered often as mutually complementary rather than conflicting. Where the authentic theological traditions of the Eastern Church are concerned, we must recognize the admirable way in which they have their roots in Holy Scripture, and how they are nurtured and given expression in the life of the liturgy. They derive their strength too from the living tradition of the apostles and from the works of the Fathers and spiritual writers of the Eastern Churches. Thus they promote the right ordering of Christian life and, indeed, pave the way to a full vision of Christian truth.

The Catholic Church's attitude was also expressed by Pope John Paul II in the image of the Church "breathing with her two lungs". He meant that there should be a combination of the more rational, juridical, organization-minded "Latin" temperament with the intuitive, mystical and contemplative spirit found in the East.

The Catechism of the Catholic Church, citing documents of the Second Vatican Council and of Pope Paul VI, states:

"The Church knows that she is joined in many ways to the baptized who are honoured by the name of Christian, but do not profess the Catholic faith in its entirety or have not preserved unity or communion under the successor of Peter" (Lumen gentium 15). Those "who believe in Christ and have been properly baptized are put in a certain, although imperfect, communion with the Catholic Church" (Unitatis redintegratio 3). With the Orthodox Churches, this communion is so profound "that it lacks little to attain the fulness that would permit a common celebration of the Lord's Eucharist" (Paul VI, Discourse, 14 December 1975; cf. Unitatis redintegratio 13-18).

On 10 July 2007, the Congregation for the Doctrine of the Faith published a document, approved by Pope Benedict XVI, that stated that the Eastern churches are separated from Rome (the member churches of the Eastern Orthodox Church, Oriental Orthodoxy and the Assyrian Church of the East) and for that very reason "lack something in their condition as particular churches", and that the division also means that "the fullness of universality, which is proper to the Church governed by the Successor of Peter and the Bishops in communion with him, is not fully realised in history."

On 3 July 2019, it was revealed that during a Vatican meeting with Orthodox Archbishop Job of Telmessos, who represented the Orthodox Church's Ecumenical Patriarch Bartholomew of Constantinople, during the feast of Sts. Peter and Paul on 29 June 2019, Pope Francis stated that unity rather than leveling differences should be the goal between the Catholic and Orthodox churches. Pope Francis also gave Bartholomew nine bone fragments which were believed to have belonged to St. Peter and which were displayed at a public Mass which was held in the Vatican in November 2013 to celebrate the "Year of Faith". Despite holding a "cordial" meeting with Russian President Vladimir Putin, with whom the Pope has had a history of good relations, on 4 July 2019 tensions between the Vatican and Russian Orthodox churches still remained, with Pope Francis stating that it is unlikely that he will visit Russia unless Putin agrees to not include the Russian Orthodox Church in the visit. Putin also stated to the Pope that he would not invite the Pope to Russia without this condition. Pope Francis also hinted that he was willing to support the concerns of Ukrainian Greek Catholic Church, which has expressed opposition to both Putin's intervention in Ukraine and the Vatican's current relationship with Putin.

== See also ==
- Eastern Christianity
- Eastern Orthodox theology
- Eastern Orthodox opposition to papal supremacy
- History of Eastern Orthodox Christian theology
- History of Catholic Mariology
- History of Catholic theology
- Catholic theology
- Western Christianity
- Western Rite Orthodoxy
- Joint International Commission for Theological Dialogue Between the Catholic Church and the Orthodox Church
- Council of Florence
- H. Tristram Engelhardt Jr. wrote extensively on the failure of Ecumenism.

== Notes ==
Subnotes
