= Ecumenical Patriarch of Constantinople =

First among equals of leaders in the Eastern Orthodox Church

Archbishop of Constantinople - New Rome and Ecumenical Patriarch
- Archbishopric

Orthodox
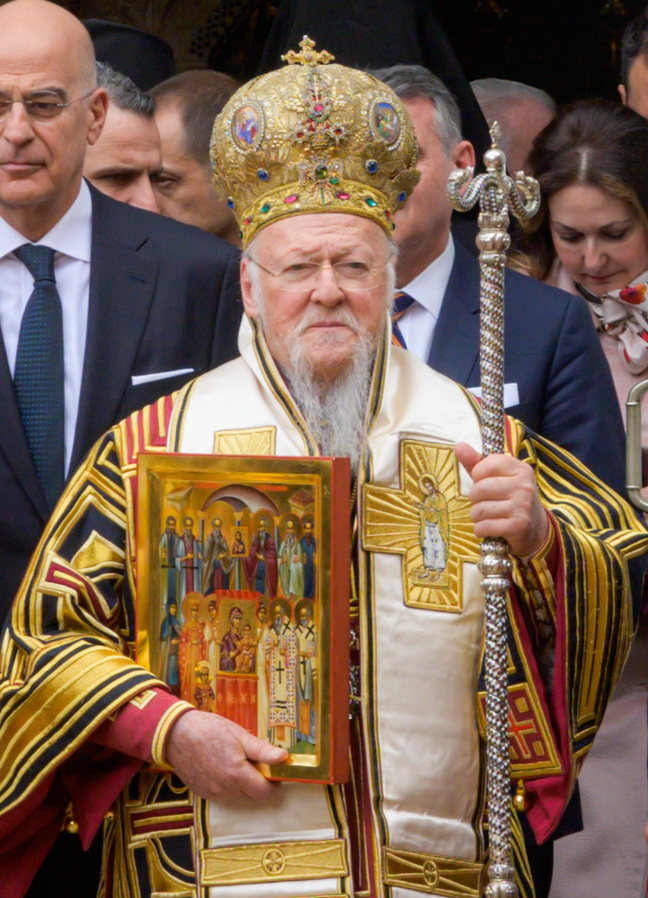
- Incumbent; Bartholomew I Since 2 November 1991
- Style: His All Holiness

Location
- Country: Turkey
- Territory: Istanbul

Information
- First holder: Andrew the Apostle (as bishop); Alexander (as archbishop); Anatolius (as patriarch)
- Established: 38 (founded); 451 (granted title of patriarch)
- Cathedral: St. George's Cathedral, Istanbul
- Language: Greek

Website
- Official website

The Ecumenical Patriarch of Constantinople (Greek: Οἰκουμενικὸς Πατριάρχης, romanized: Oikoumenikós Patriárchēs) is the archbishop of Constantinople and primus inter pares (first among equals) among the heads of the several autocephalous churches that comprise the Eastern Orthodox Church. The ecumenical patriarch is regarded as the representative and spiritual leader of the Eastern Orthodox Christians worldwide. The term ecumenical in the title is a historical reference to the Ecumene, a Greek designation for the civilised world, i.e. the Roman Empire, and it stems from Canon 28 of the Council of Chalcedon.

The patriarch's see, the Ecumenical Patriarchate of Constantinople, is one of the most enduring institutions in the world and has had a prominent part in world history. The ecumenical patriarchs in ancient times helped in the spread of Christianity and the resolution of various doctrinal disputes. In the Middle Ages, they played a major role in the affairs of the Eastern Orthodox Church, as well as in the politics of the Orthodox world, and in spreading Christianity among the Slavs. Currently, in addition to the expansion of the Christian faith and the Eastern Orthodox doctrine, the patriarchs are involved in ecumenism and interfaith dialogue, charitable work, and the defense of Orthodox Christian traditions.

Within the five apostolic sees of the Pentarchy, the ecumenical patriarch is regarded as the successor of Andrew the Apostle. The current holder of the office is Bartholomew I, the 270th bishop of that see, whose ecological efforts have won him the epithet of "the Green Patriarch".

== Status in the Orthodox Church ==
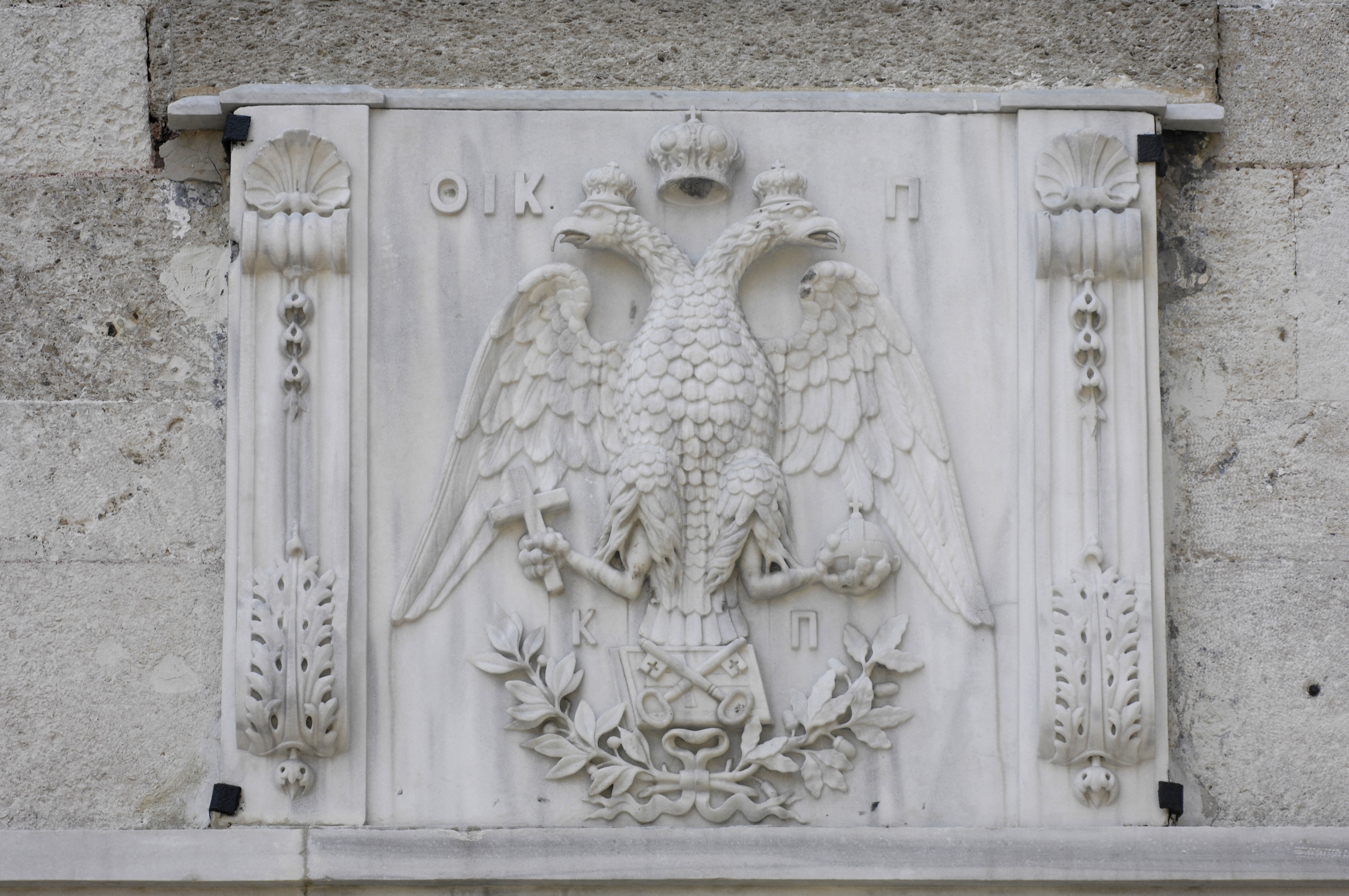
Double-headed eagle emblem atop the entrance of the Patriarchate of Constantinople.

Styles of The Ecumenical Patriarch of Constantinople
- Reference style: His All Holiness
- Spoken style: Your All Holiness
- Religious style: Ecumenical Patriarch
- Posthumous style: N/A

The ecumenical patriarch of Constantinople is first among equals, or first in honor among all Eastern Orthodox bishops, who presides in person—or through a delegate—over any council of Orthodox primates or bishops in which he takes part and serves as primary spokesman for the Orthodox communion especially in ecumenical contacts with other Christian denominations. He has no direct jurisdiction over the other patriarchs or the other autocephalous Orthodox churches, but he, alone among his fellow primates, enjoys the right of convening extraordinary synods consisting of them or their delegates to deal with ad hoc situations and has also convened well-attended pan-Orthodox synods in the last 40 years. His unique role often sees the ecumenical patriarch referred to as the spiritual leader of the Orthodox Church in some sources, though this is not an official title of the patriarch nor is it usually used in scholarly sources on the patriarchate. The Orthodox Church is entirely decentralized: it has no central authority, earthly head, or single bishop in a leadership role. Because it has a synodical system canonically, it is significantly distinguished from the hierarchically organized Catholic Church, whose doctrine is papal supremacy and whose head is the pope. His titles primus inter pares. 'first among equals', and "ecumenical patriarch" are of honor rather than authority, and in fact the ecumenical patriarch has no real authority over churches other than the Constantinopolitan.

The ecumenical patriarch of Constantinople is the direct administrative superior of dioceses and archdioceses serving millions of Greek, Ukrainian, Rusyn and Albanian believers in North and South America, Western Europe, Australia and New Zealand, South Korea, as well as parts of modern Greece which, for historical reasons, do not fall under the jurisdiction of the Church of Greece.

His actual position is patriarch of the Orthodox Church of Constantinople, one of the fourteen autocephalous and several autonomous churches and the most senior (though not oldest) of the four orthodox ancient primatial sees among the five patriarchal Christian centers comprising the ancient Pentarchy of the undivided Church. In his role as head of the Orthodox Church of Constantinople, he is known as the "archbishop of Constantinople, New Rome".

The Ecumenical Patriarchate is also sometimes called the Greek Patriarchate of Constantinople to distinguish it from the Armenian Patriarchate and the extinct Latin Patriarchate, which was created after the Latin capture of Constantinople in 1204, during the Fourth Crusade.

=== History ===
The see of Byzantium, whose foundation was later ascribed to Andrew the Apostle, was originally a common bishopric. It gained importance when Emperor Constantine elevated Byzantium to a second capital alongside Rome and named it Constantinople. The see's ecclesiastical status as the second of five patriarchates was developed by the Ecumenical Councils of Constantinople in 381 and Chalcedon in 451.

The Turkish government recognizes him as the spiritual leader of the Greek minority in Turkey, but does not recognize the title "Ecumenical Patriarch", instead referring to him as the Roman (literally Rûm) Orthodox patriarch of Fener (Turkish: Fener Rum Ortodoks Patriği). The patriarch was subject to the authority of the Ottoman Empire after the conquest of Constantinople in 1453, until the declaration of Turkish Republic in 1923. Today, according to Turkish law, he is subject to the authority of the state of Turkey and is required to be a citizen of Turkey to be patriarch.

The patriarch of Constantinople has been dubbed the ecumenical patriarch since the sixth century. The exact significance of the style, which has been used occasionally for other prelates since the middle of the fifth century, is nowhere officially defined but, according to the Oxford Dictionary of the Christian Church, the title has been criticized in the Catholic Church as incompatible with the claims of the Holy See.

=== Mount Athos ===
The monastic communities of Mount Athos are stauropegic and they are directly under the jurisdiction of the ecumenical patriarch, the only bishop who has jurisdiction over them. Athos, officially the "Autonomous Monastic State of the Holy Mountain" (Ancient Greek: Αυτόνομη Μοναστικὴ Πολιτεία Ἁγίου Ὄρους), is a self-governed polity within the Greek state subject to the Ministry of Foreign Affairs in its political aspect and to the ecumenical patriarch of Constantinople as regards its religious aspect. It is home to 20 monasteries and numerous other monastic communities.

== Episcopacy role ==
The ecumenical patriarch has a unique role among Eastern Orthodox bishops, though it is not without controversy. He is primus inter pares ("first among equals"), as he is senior among all Orthodox bishops. This primacy, expressed in canonical literature as presbeia ("prerogatives", literally: "seniorities"), grants to the ecumenical patriarch the right to preside at pan-Orthodox synods.

Additionally, the canonical literature of the Orthodox Church grants to the ecumenical patriarch the right to hear appeals in cases of dispute between bishops. However, whether these canonical rights are limited only to his own patriarchate or are universal throughout the Orthodox Church is the subject of debate, especially between the Ecumenical Patriarchate and the Russian Orthodox Church.

Historically, the ecumenical patriarch has heard such appeals and sometimes was invited to intervene in other churches' disputes and difficulties. Even as early as the fourth century, Constantinople was instrumental in the deposition of multiple bishops outside its traditional jurisdiction. This still occurs today, as when in 2006 the patriarchate was invited to assist in declaring Chrysostomos I of Cyprus, the archbishop of the Church of Cyprus, incompetent due to his having Alzheimer's disease. Additionally, in 2005, the Ecumenical Patriarchate convoked a pan-Orthodox synod to express the Orthodox world's confirmation of the deposition of Patriarch Irenaios of Jerusalem. In 2006, the patriarchate was invited to hear the appeal of a Russian Orthodox bishop in the United Kingdom in a dispute with his superior in Moscow, though the result of that appeal – and the right to make it – were both rejected by the latter.

The ecumenical patriarch has no direct jurisdiction outside the Patriarchate of Constantinople granted to him in Orthodox canonical literature, but his primary function regarding the whole Orthodox Church is one of dealing with relations between autocephalous and autonomous churches. That is, his primary role is one of promoting and sustaining Church unity.

This unique role often sees the ecumenical patriarch referred to as the "spiritual leader" of the Orthodox Church in some sources, though this is not an official title of the patriarch nor is it usually used in scholarly sources on the patriarchate. Such a title is acceptable if it refers to this unique role, but it sometimes leads to the mistaken belief that the office is thus the equivalent of an Orthodox pope. There is, however, no Orthodox notion equivalent to the papacy: the Orthodox churches operate in the synodical system, whereby ecclesiastical matters are settled by the competent synod of bishops, in which each bishop has one vote. The five patriarchs of the ancient Pentarchy (Rome, Constantinople, Alexandria, Antioch, and Jerusalem, in that order) are to be given the seniority of honour, but have no actual power over other bishops other than the power of the synod they are chairing (and in which they also wield one vote).

In 2007, the patriarch gave his approval to the Ravenna Document, a Catholic–Orthodox document re-asserting that the bishop of Rome was indeed the prōtos ("first") of the Church in the first millenium, as in "first among equals", although future discussions are to be held on the concrete ecclesiological exercise of papal primacy.

== Title ==
The Ecumenical Patriarch bears the name: "(name), by the grace of God Archbishop of Constantinople, New Rome and Ecumenical Patriarch".

== Early history ==
The (arch)bishopric of Constantinople has had a continuous history since the founding of the city in AD 330 by Constantine the Great. After Constantine the Great had enlarged Byzantium to make it into a second capital city in 330, it was thought appropriate that its bishop, once a suffragan of the Exarch of Thrace and Macedonia, the Metropolitan of Heraclea, should be elevated to an archbishopric. For many decades, the heads of the church of Rome opposed this ambition, due to their existing papal claims, and because they defended the 'Petrine principle' by which all Patriarchates were derived from Saint Peter and were unwilling to violate the old order of the hierarchy for political reasons.

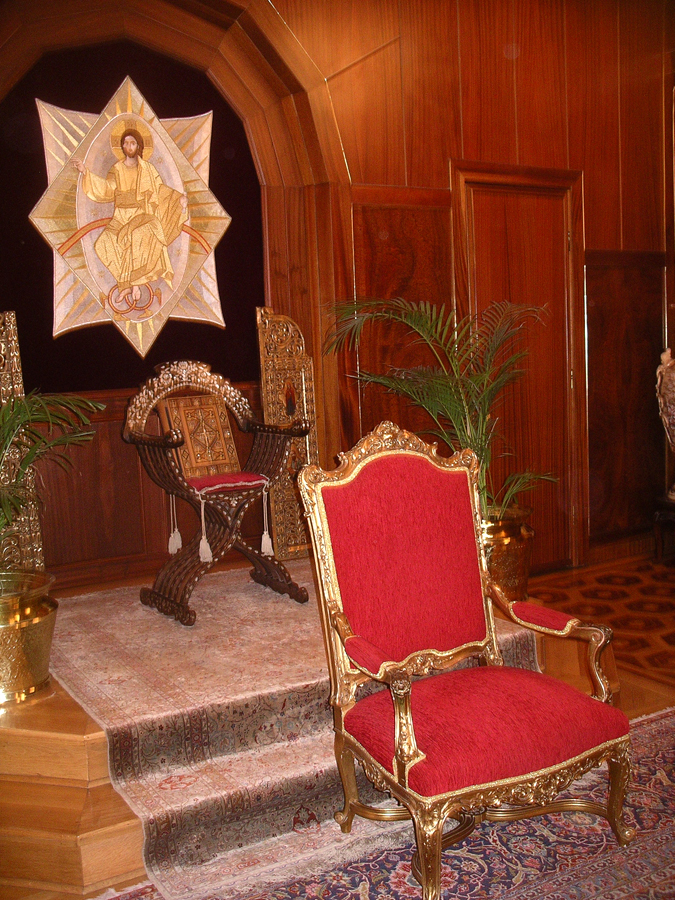
Throne room inside the Patriarchate of Constantinople. The Gospel is enthroned on the dais; the patriarch sits on the lower throne in front.

In 381, the First Council of Constantinople declared that "The Bishop of Constantinople shall have the primacy of honour after the Bishop of Rome, because it is New Rome" (Canon III). The prestige of the office continued to grow not only because of the obvious patronage of the Byzantine Emperor but because of its overwhelming geographical importance.

The Council of Chalcedon in 451 established Constantinople as a patriarchate with ecclesiastical jurisdiction over Asia Minor (the dioceses of Asiane and Pontus) and Thrace as well as over the barbaric territories, non-converted lands outside the defined area of the Western Patriarchate (Old Rome) and the other three patriarchates, Alexandria, Antioch and Jerusalem, gave it appellate jurisdiction extraterritorially over canon law decisions by the other patriarchs and granted it honours equal to those belonging to the first Christian see, Rome, in terms of primacy, Rome retaining however its seniority (Canon XXVIII). Leo I refused to accept this canon, basing himself on the fact that it was made in the absence of his legates. In the sixth century, the official title became that of "archbishop of Constantinople, New Rome, and ecumenical patriarch".

== Ottoman ethnarchy ==
When the Ottoman Turks conquered Constantinople in 1453, the patriarchate ceased to function. The Patriarchate was restored by the conquering ruler, Sultan Mehmed II, who wished to establish his dynasty as the direct heirs of the Eastern Roman emperors, and who adopted the imperial title Kayser-i-Rûm "caesar of the Romans", one of his subsidiary titles but a significant one. In 1454 he bestowed the office upon an illustrious Byzantine scholar-monk who was well known for his opposition to union with the Latin West, Gennadius Scholarius, who became Patriarch Gennadius II.

The patriarch was designated millet-başı (ethnarch) of the Millet of Rum, which included all Orthodox Christians under Ottoman rule, regardless of their ethnicity in the modern sense. This role was carried out by ethnic Greeks at their great peril, in the midst of enormous difficulties and traps and inevitably with mixed success. Several patriarchs were summarily executed by the Ottoman authorities, most notably Gregory V, who was lynched on Easter Monday 1821 in revenge for the outbreak of the Greek Revolution.

In the 19th century, the rising tide of nationalism and secularism among the Balkan Christian nations led to the establishment of several autocephalous national churches, generally under autonomous patriarchs or archbishops, leaving the ecumenical patriarch only direct control over the ethnically Greek-originated Orthodox Christians of Turkey, parts of Greece and the archdioceses in North America, Asia, Africa and Oceania where growing Greek and other migrant communities have gradually constituted a significant orthodox diaspora.

== Relationship with the Republic of Turkey ==
After the proclamation of the Republic of Turkey on 29 October 1923, the Turkish state only recognises the patriarch as the spiritual leader of the Greek minority in Turkey, and officially refers to him as the "Greek Orthodox Patriarch of the Phanar" or "Roman Orthodox Patriarch of Constantinople" (Turkish: Fener Rum Ortodoks Patriği; Phanar is the neighbourhood in Istanbul where the patriarchate is located). According to Turkish law, still in force today, he is subject to the authority of the Republic of Turkey; however, Turkey allows the Standing Synod of Metropolitan Bishops to elect the patriarch. To be electable, Turkish law requires the candidates to be Turkish citizens. Since the establishment of modern Turkey, the position of the ecumenical patriarch has been filled by Turkish-born citizens of Greek ethnicity. As nearly all Greek Orthodox have left Turkey (see Population exchange between Greece and Turkey and Istanbul Pogrom), this considerably narrows the field of candidates for succession.

Human rights groups have long protested against conditions placed by the secular government of Turkey on the ecumenical patriarch, a religious office. The same policy also applied to the institution of the Islamic Caliphate, which was abolished by Turkey. For example, the ecumenical status accorded him traditionally within Eastern Orthodoxy, and recognized previously by the Ottoman governments, has on occasion been a source of controversy within the Republic of Turkey. This policy results in problems in the function of the patriarchate, since clergy coming from abroad are not eligible to apply for residence and work permits. In its early days the Turkish state promoted a rival Turkish Orthodox Patriarchate, whose congregation, however, has remained limited.

Expropriation of Church property and the conditions of state control imposed on the Orthodox Theological School of Halki that have led to its closure by the Patriarchate, are also cited by human rights groups. However, in 2004 Patriarch Bartholomew, with the help of the Turkish government, succeeded, after eighty years, in altering the composition of the twelve-member Standing Synod of Metropolitan Bishops in Constantinople so that it can include six bishops from outside Turkey. He has also been convening biennially in Constantinople convocations of all bishops in his jurisdiction.

The Ecumenical Patriarchate of Constantinople has suffered attacks from 1993 to 2004, including desecration of patriarchal cemeteries as well as assaults on the ecumenical patriarch.

After the protests from Turkey, the signature of the Ecumenical Patriarchate was removed from the statement of the June 2024 Ukraine peace summit.

== See also ==
- Archons of the Ecumenical Patriarchate
- Church of St. George, Istanbul
- Eastern Christianity
- Ecumenical Patriarchate of Constantinople
- History of the Eastern Orthodox Church
- List of bishops and Ecumenical Patriarchs of Constantinople
- Armenian Patriarch of Constantinople
- Latin Patriarchate of Constantinople
