= Ravenna Document =

Document re-asserting that the bishop of Rome is the first among the patriarchs (2007)

The Ravenna Document is a Roman Catholic–Eastern Orthodox document issued on 13 October 2007, re-asserting that the bishop of Rome is indeed the first (Greek: πρώτος, romanized: protos) among the patriarchs, although future discussions are to be held on the concrete ecclesiological exercise of papal primacy. The document was issued at the tenth plenary session of the Joint International Commission for Theological Dialogue Between the Catholic Church and the Orthodox Church held from 8 to 14 October 2007 in Ravenna, Italy.

The signing of the declaration highlighted the internal tensions between the Patriarchate of Constantinople and the Moscow Patriarchate, on account of whether the Estonian Apostolic Orthodox Church had a right to be represented in Ravenna, which eventually led the Moscow delegation to walk out of the talks. It was an internal dispute within Orthodoxy, however, and had no relation to the issues actually addressed at Ravenna.
