= Lartey =

Lartey is a surname. Notable people with the surname include:

- Benjamin Dorme Lartey, Liberian cleric
- Henry Herbert Lartey (born 1954), Ghanaian accountant, entrepreneur, and politician
- Lawrence Lartey (born 1994), Ghanaian footballer
- Mohammed Lartey (born 1986), Ghanaian-German footballer
- Solomon Lartey, Ghanaian businessman
