= Dick Wagner (activist) =

American historian

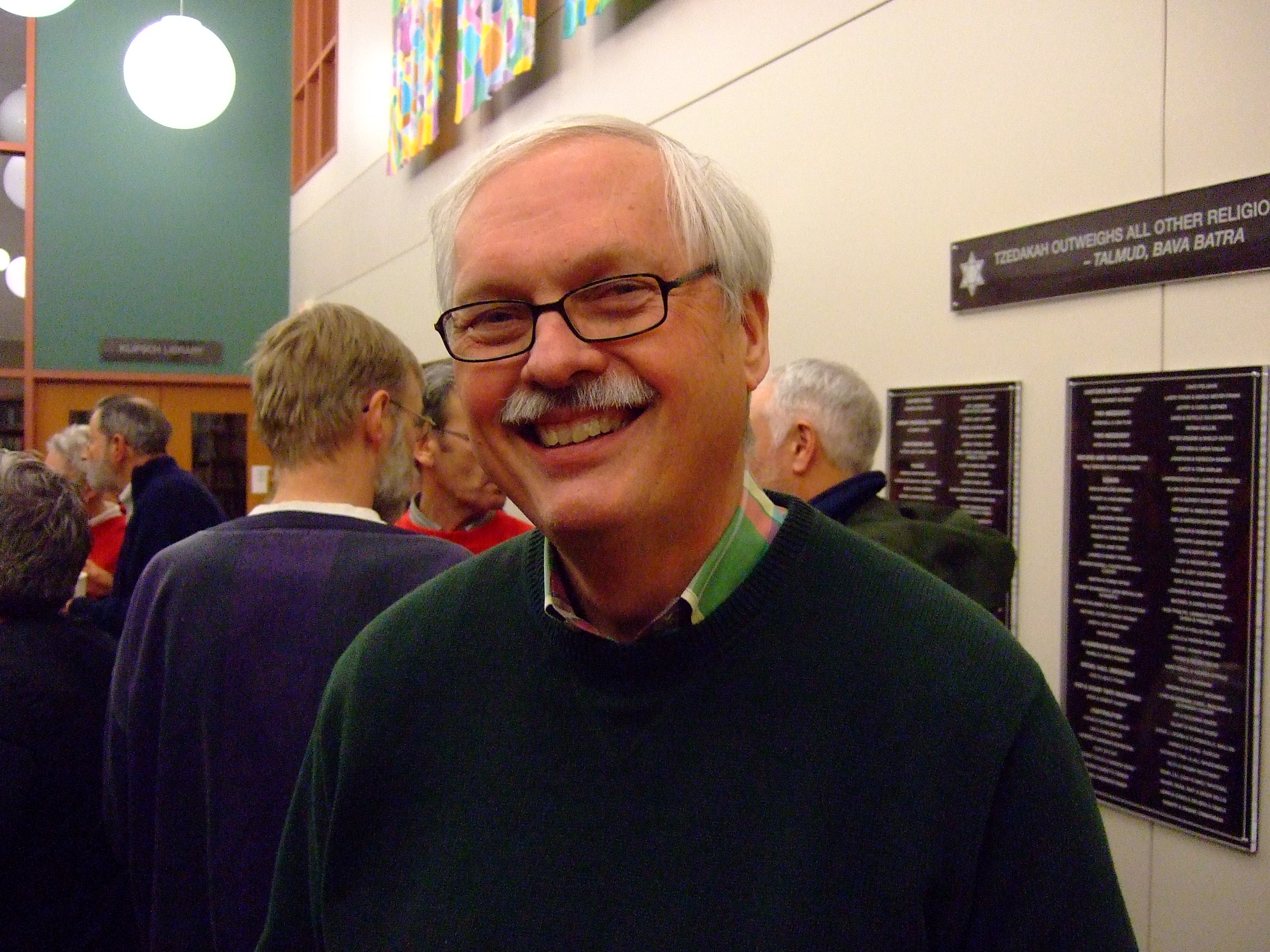
- Dick Wagner in Temple Beth El, Madison, Wisconsin in 2008

Member of the Dane County Board of Supervisors from the 6th district
- In office April 1980 – April 1994
- Succeeded by: John Hendrick

Personal details
- Born: Roland Richard Wagner; September 23, 1943 Dayton, Ohio, U.S.
- Died: December 13, 2021 (aged 78) Madison, Wisconsin, U.S.
- Education: University of Dayton (BA) University of Wisconsin–Madison (MA, PhD)

Roland Richard Wagner (September 23, 1943 – December 13, 2021) was an American historian, activist, and politician, most noted for his writings on Wisconsin LGBT history, the creation of organizations to elect gays and lesbians to public office, and public service to Madison, Wisconsin, and Dane County.

== Life and career ==
Wagner was born on September 29, 1943, to Roland A. Wagner and Katherine Moorman Wagner in Dayton, Ohio. He completed a bachelor's degree (1965) at the University of Dayton and both a master's degree (1967) and a Ph.D. (1971) in American history at the University of Wisconsin–Madison. Entitled “Virtue Against Vice: A Study of Moral Reformers and Prostitution in the Progressive Era”, his doctoral dissertation was written under the direction of Professor E. David Cronon. While a graduate student at the UW-Madison, Wagner helped organize rallies against the Vietnam War and was active in the Eugene McCarthy 1968 presidential campaign and the Patrick Lucey campaign in 1970 Wisconsin gubernatorial election. He was also involved in protesting for fair housing in Milwaukee with Father James Groppi, a Catholic civil rights activist based in Milwaukee. During these years, Wagner attended the Catholic chapel on campus, but he later attended the ecumenical Holy Wisdom Monastery due to the increasing conservatism of the Madison diocese. In 1972, he was named executive director of the American Revolution Bicentennial Commission. In 1977, he managed the executive residence for Governor Martin Schreiber. In 1979, he became a budget analyst at the Wisconsin Department of Administration. He retired from civil service in 2005.

Wagner ran for the Madison Common Council in 1974, but was not successful. In 1980, he was elected to the Dane County Board of Supervisors, and he served until 1994. He chaired the board from 1988 until 1992. While on the County Board, he arranged for a long-term loan of the Gay Liberation Monument sculpture by George Segal, which was displayed in Madison's Orton Park prior to its final siting at Christopher Street in New York City. In 1993 Wagner co-founded the New Harvest Foundation, which funds Wisconsin’s LGBT communities.

In addition to his service on the Dane County Board of Supervisors, Wagner was the first chair of the Dane County Regional Transit Authority. He also served on the Madison Plan Commission, the Board of Downtown Madison Inc, the Madison Urban Design Commission, the Madison Landmarks Commission, the Wisconsin Humanities Council, Historic Madison, the Wisconsin Arts Board, the Madison Trust for Historic Preservation, the board of the Olbrich Botanical Gardens, the board of the Friends of UW Libraries, and the GLBT Alumni Council of the UW-Madison Alumni Association. In 2007, he was the first recipient of Madison’s Jeffrey Clay Erlanger Civility in Public Discourse Award.

== LGBT electoral activism ==
In 1972 Wagner organized the successful electoral campaign of then 18-year-old David Clarenbach to the Dane County Board of Supervisors, though neither Wagner nor Clarenbach was publicly out at the time. Wagner assisted in Clarenbach’s election to the Wisconsin State Assembly in 1974. On the municipal level, Wagner lobbied for a gay rights ordinance in 1974, and in 1975 the City of Madison passed the first gay rights ordinance in the state by amending its Equal Opportunities Ordinance to prohibit discrimination on the basis of sexual orientation.

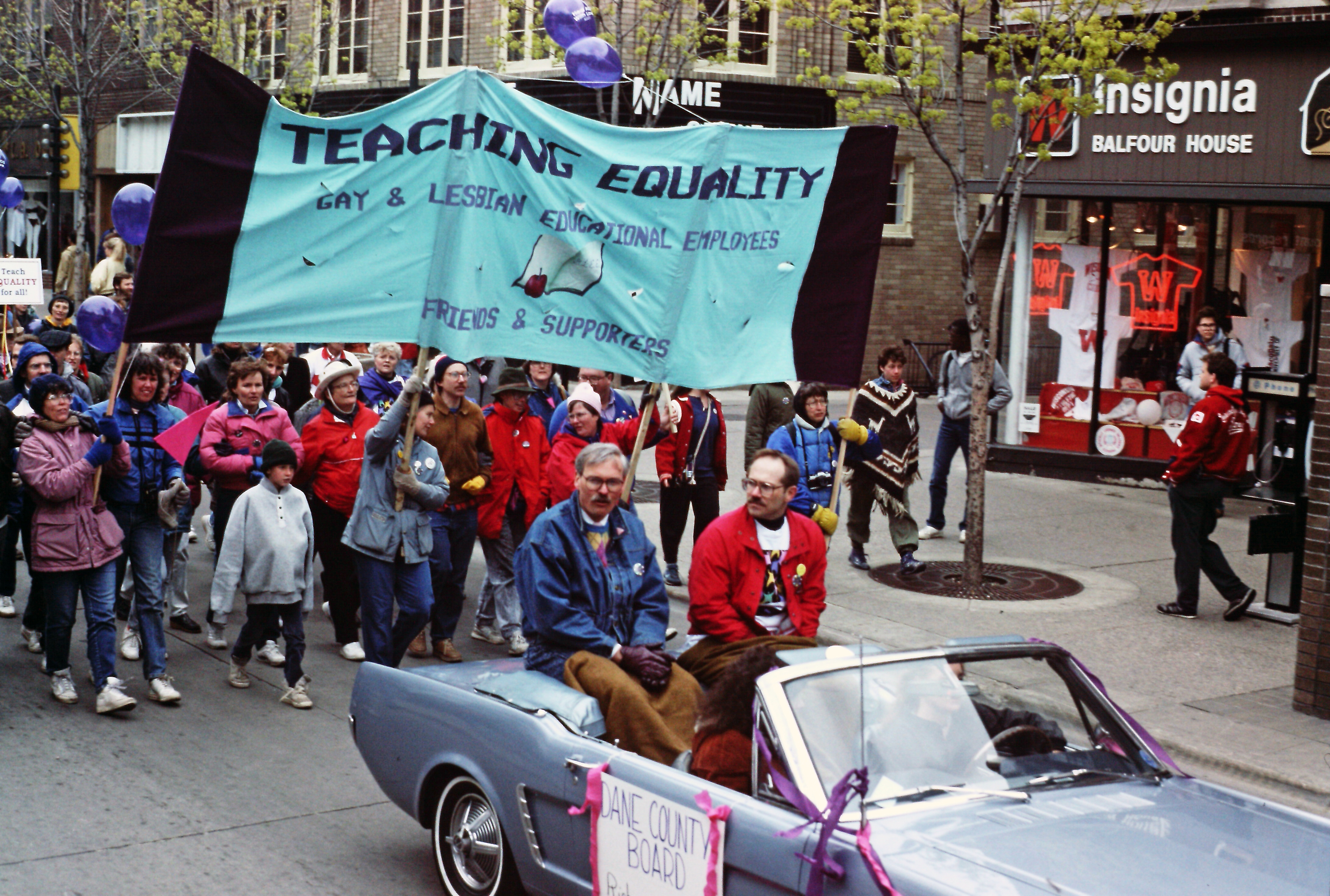
Dick Wagner (left, in the car) at the GALVAnize march organized by the Gay and Lesbian Visibility Alliance in Madison, 1989.

In 1981 Wagner recruited Kathleen Nichols to run in the upcoming 1982 election for the Dane County Board of Supervisors as an out lesbian. Although Wagner had been out to friends for some time, he himself came out to the press that spring.

In 1982 Wagner again worked with Clarenbach and others in the state legislature to craft a statewide bill to ban discrimination based on sexual orientation. It was signed into law by Republican Governor Lee Sherman Dreyfus. Clarenbach later said, “I don’t think I can overstate the role he played… If there was no Dick Wagner, I doubt Wisconsin would have become the Gay Rights State.”

In 1983 newly elected Governor Tony Earl, who had campaigned with a gay rights plank in his platform, tasked Wagner and Nichols with traveling around the state to meet with LGBT groups and communities and reporting back to him on the issues his administration could tackle. After they submitted their report, Earl appointed Wagner and Nichols to co-chair a newly established Governor’s Council on Lesbian and Gay Issues. Almost immediately, the Council began coordinating a state-level response to the AIDS crisis.

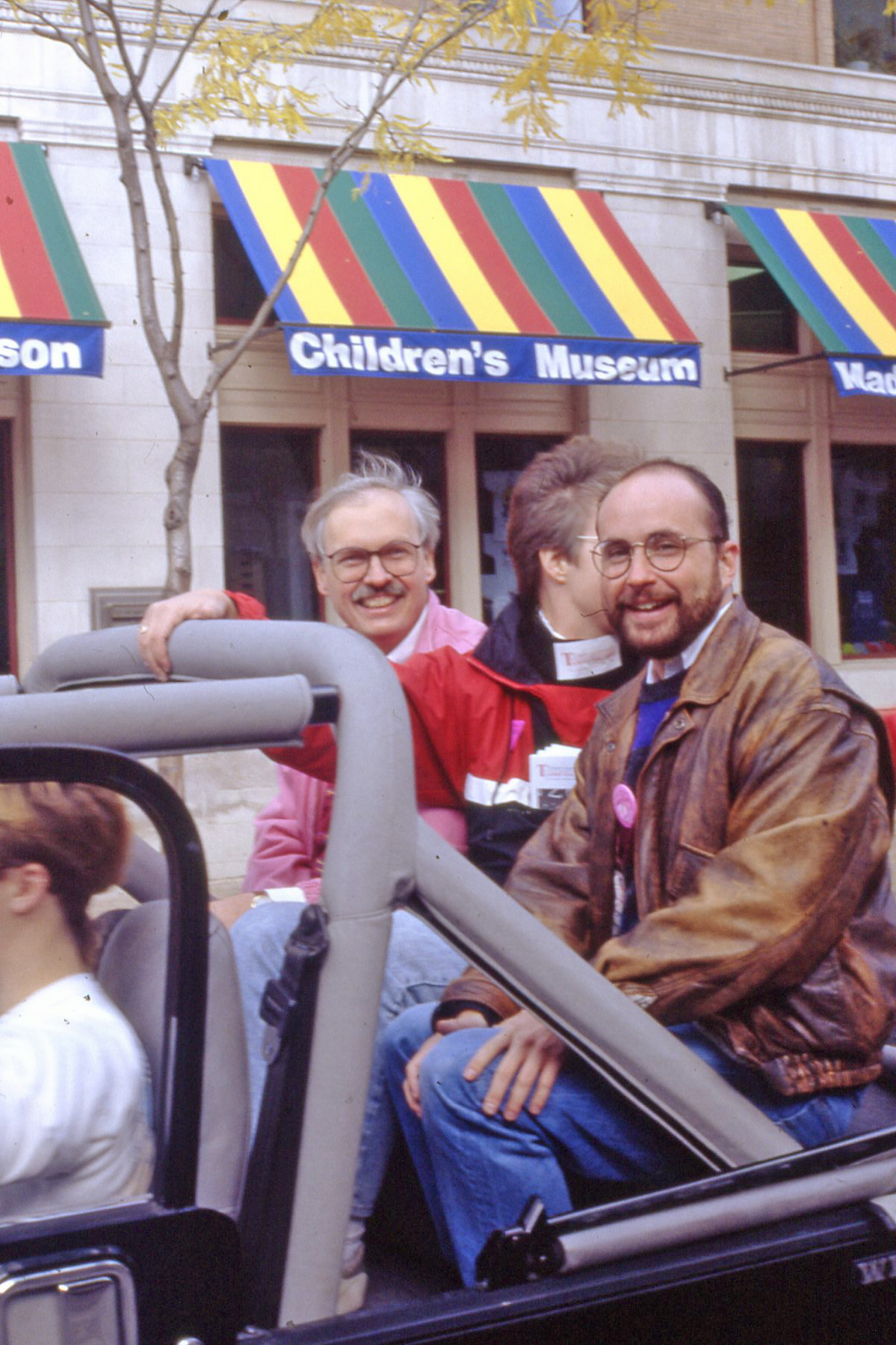
Dick Wagner (left) along with Tammy Baldwin and Mark Pocan at Madison Gay Pride Parade, 1991.

In November 1985 Wagner and Nichols joined ten other out elected officials for the first National Conference of Openly Lesbian and Gay Elected Officials. At the time, there were an estimated nineteen out elected officials in the United States. The conference convened annually under the auspices of the International Network of Lesbian and Gay Officials (INLGO). INLGO would later merge with the Gay and Lesbian Leadership Institute (now known as the LGBTQ Victory Fund).

== Books ==
In 2019 Wagner published We've Been Here All Along, which recounted Wisconsin's LGBT history from the 1895 newspaper reports on Oscar Wilde's trials to the Stonewall riots of 1969. He drew on archival material to recover heretofore untold stories of LGBT Wisconsinites and the development of their communities, identities, and support networks. The book recounts how they managed to survive and at times thrive despite hostility from the government and the general public, including the Lavender Scare of the 1950s. In a second book, Coming Out, Moving Forward: Wisconsin's Recent Gay History (2020), Wagner surveyed the challenges faced by Wisconsin's LGBT community in the years following Stonewall, from 1969 to 2000. Together, these two volumes formed the basis of a two-part television documentary, "Wisconsin Pride" (2023).

Wagner authored a history of the Wisconsin Department of Administration entitled DOA, the Story: Four Decades of Wisconsin‘s Department of Administration (OCLC 53175734) that was published in 2002. He also contributed a chapter on "Wisconsin Academics Outing LGBT Policies" to Education for Democracy: Renewing the Wisconsin Idea (University of Wisconsin Press 2020, ISBN 9780299328900 OCLC 1199891851) edited by Chad Allen Goldberg, a book that uses the Wisconsin Idea as a frame to uphold public higher education institutions as a bastion of collaborative problem solving.

== Death and legacy ==
Wagner died on December 13, 2021, while carrying groceries to a neighbor that had been mistakenly delivered to his address. He died in Kerr-McGee Triangle Park, a downtown Madison pocket park that he had been instrumental in creating; it has since been renamed the R. Richard Wagner Park. His funeral, an ecumenical Christian service, was held at Holy Wisdom Monastery.

At his death, statements were released by US Senator Tammy Baldwin, Governor Tony Evers, Madison Mayor Satya Rhodes-Conway, Dane County Executive Joe Parisi, and former Madison Mayor Dave Cieslewicz, who a few years earlier had proposed naming Madison's city hall in honor of Wagner. The UW-Madison History Department also posted a tribute to Wagner, and Congressman Mark Pocan released a video tribute.

Mayor Rhodes-Conway later selected a portrait of Wagner as the 2022 Mayor’s Purchase Award. Painted by Rae Senarighi a.k.a. Transpainter, the painting was dedicated in a joint ceremony with the City of Madison and Dane County, joining a painting of Nathan Dane as the only two portraits of individuals at the entrance to the chambers of the Madison Common Council and Dane County Board of Supervisors.

To mark Wagner's passing, the University of Wisconsin Libraries established the R. Richard Wagner Pride Archive fund. His papers constitute a large part of the university’s collection of LGBTQ+ materials from Madison and Dane County. Wagner left a major bequest to the Wisconsin LGBTQ History Project.

== Bibliography ==
- Wagner, Dick (2002). DOA, the Story: Four Decades of Wisconsin's Department of Administration. Wisconsin Dept. of Administration. OCLC 53175734.
- Wagner, Dick (2019). We've Been Here All Along. Wisconsin Historical Society Press. ISBN 9780870209123.
- Wagner, Dick (2020). Coming Out, Moving Forward: Wisconsin's Recent Gay History. Wisconsin Historical Society Press. ISBN 9780870209284.
- Wagner, Dick (2020). "Wisconsin Academics Outing LGBT Policies." In Education for Democracy: Renewing the Wisconsin Idea. Chad Alan Goldberg, ed. University of Wisconsin Press. ISBN 978-0-299-32890-0.
