= Sumowood Harris =

Liberian Lutheran bishop

Sumowood Harris is a Liberian Lutheran bishop. He served as the president of the Liberian Council of Churches and is a peace activist.

== See also ==
- Benjamin Dorme Lartey
