= Ecumenism =

Cooperation between Christian denominations

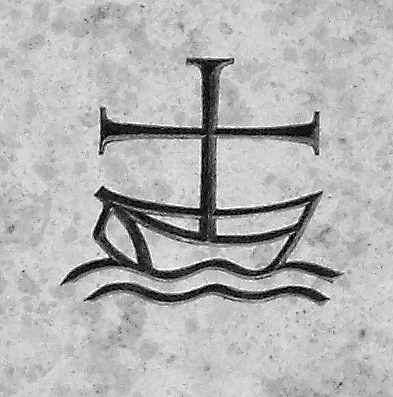
Ecumenism symbol from a plaque in St. Anne's Church, Augsburg, Germany. It shows Christianity as a boat at sea with the cross serving as the mast.

Ecumenism (/ɪˈkjuːməˌnɪzəm/ ih-KEW-mə-niz-əm; alternatively spelled oecumenism) – also called interdenominationalism, or ecumenicalism – is the concept and principle that Christians who belong to different Christian denominations and theological traditions should work together to develop closer relationships among their churches and promote Christian unity. The adjective ecumenical is thus applied to any inter-denominational initiative which encourages greater cooperation and union among Christian denominations and churches. Ecumenical dialogue is a central feature of contemporary ecumenism.

The reception of the sacrament of baptism and faith in Jesus is seen as the basis of ecumenism and its goal for Christian unity. Ecumenists cite John 17:20–23 as the biblical grounds of striving for church unity, in which Jesus prays "may all be one" in order "that the world may know" and believe the Gospel message.

In 1920, the Ecumenical Patriarch of the Eastern Orthodox Church, Germanus V of Constantinople, wrote a letter "addressed 'To all the Churches of Christ, wherever they may be', urging closer co-operation among separated Christians, and suggesting a 'League of Churches', parallel to the newly founded League of Nations". In 1937, Christian leaders from mainstream Christian churches resolved to establish the World Council of Churches, to work for the cause of Christian unity; it today includes churches from most major traditions of Christianity as full members, including the Assyrian Church of the East, the Old Catholic Church, the Oriental Orthodox Churches, the Lutheran World Federation, the Anglican Communion, the Baptist World Alliance, the Mennonite churches, the World Methodist Council, the Moravian Church, the Pentecostal churches and the World Communion of Reformed Churches, as well as almost all jurisdictions of the Eastern Orthodox Church; the Roman Catholic Church participates as an observer, sending delegates to official gatherings. Substantial agreement between various Christian denominations, especially those of Catholicism and Protestantism, has led to a unified presentation of the Christian religion in The Common Catechism.

Many regional councils affiliated with the World Council of Churches, such as the Middle East Council of Churches, National Council of Churches in Australia and Christian Churches Together, work for the cause of Christian unity on the domestic level, with member denominations including churches from the Oriental Orthodox, Evangelical-Lutheran, Roman Catholic, Eastern Orthodox, Methodist, Anglican, and Reformed traditions, among others.

On a local level, ecumenical initiatives occur through holding prayer services and Bible studies, with members of various denominations present, as well as the undertaking of service activities together. A number of Christian religious orders, monasteries and convents are ecumenical, with believers of a number of denominations praying together and living under a common rule of life (a prominent example is the Taizé Community). Each year, Christians observe the Week of Prayer for Christian Unity for the goal of ecumenism, which is coordinated by the World Council of Churches and adopted by many of its member churches.

== Terminology ==
According the Roman Catholic Church, ecumenism refers to cooperation or efforts towards unity among Christian denominations, while interfaith dialogue (interreligious dialogue) refers to developing an understanding between Christianity and non-Christian religions, such as Hinduism and Shintoism.

The terms ecumenism and ecumenical come from the Greek οἰκουμένη (oikoumene), which means "the whole inhabited world", and was historically used with specific reference to the Roman Empire. The ecumenical vision comprises both the search for the visible unity of the Christian Church (Ephesians 4:3) and the "whole inhabited earth" (Matthew 24:14) as the concern of all Christians. In Christianity, the qualification ecumenical was originally used, and still is, in terms such as "ecumenical council" and "Ecumenical Patriarch", in the meaning of pertaining to the totality of the larger church (such as the Catholic Church or the Eastern Orthodox Church) rather than being restricted to one of its constituent local churches or dioceses. Used in this sense, the term carries no connotation of re-uniting the historically separated Christian denominations but presumes a unity of local congregations in a worldwide communion.

== Purpose and goal ==
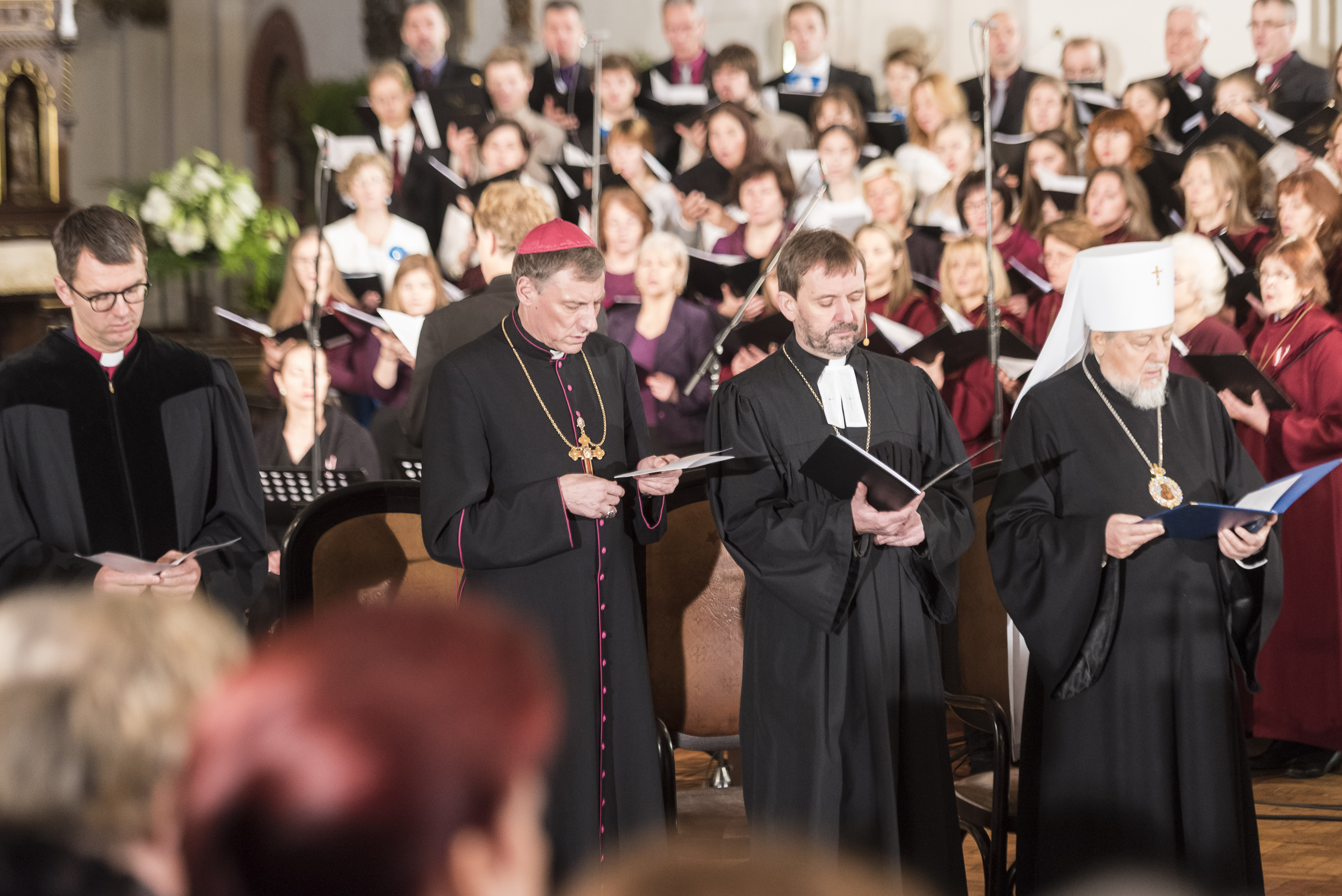
An ecumenical gathering with Christian clergy from the Roman Catholic, Evangelical-Lutheran, and Eastern Orthodox Churches at the Evangelical-Lutheran Cathedral Church of Saint Mary (18 November 2015)

The term ecumenism as it is now commonly used refers to interdenominational cooperation between different Christian churches. These initiatives can range from local churches of different denominations operating a soup kitchen for the poor, hosting an ecumenical Bible study with participants from different Christian traditions, inviting all baptized Christians to partake in a Lovefeast when churches celebrate them, to holding an ecumenical Stations of the Cross service on Fridays during the Christian liturgical season of Lent with the service being held at a different local church each Friday (e.g. Catholic, Lutheran, Moravian, Anglican, Reformed and Methodist). A number of Christian religious orders, convents, and monasteries are ecumenical, accepting believers from various denominations; associated with these are oblates and third orders that are ecumenical as well. These Christians live according to a common rule of life and pray with one another.

The ultimate goal of ecumenism is the recognition of sacramental validity, eucharistic sharing, and the reaching of full communion between different Christian denominations. There are a variety of different expectations of what that Christian unity looks like, how it is brought about, what ecumenical methods ought to be engaged, and what both short- and long-term objectives of the ecumenical movement should be.

Baptism according to the Trinitarian formula, which is done in most mainstream Christian denominations, is seen as being the grounds for Christian ecumenism, the concept of unity amongst Christians. With respect to ecumenism, A. W. Tozer maintained that "Unity in Christ is not something to be achieved; it is something to be recognized." Ecumenists cite John 17:20–23 as the Biblical basis of striving for church unity, in which Jesus prays that Christians "may all be one" in order "that the world may know" and believe the Gospel message. As such, ecumenism has a strong implication for the Christian Church's mission of evangelism, which is referenced in John 13:35: "By this all men will know that you are my disciples, if you love one another". Additionally, Jesus emphasized that the ties of Christians to one another are much greater than those to blood relatives.

Historically, the term "ecumenism" was originally used in the context of the larger ecumenical councils organised with the support of the Roman Emperor. The aim of these councils was to clarify matters of Christian theology and doctrine, leading to the meaning of unity behind the term "ecumenical". The ecumenical councils brought together bishops from across the Roman Empire, with a total of seven ecumenical councils accepted to have been held by both the Eastern Orthodox and Catholic churches before the Great Schism dividing the two churches; the first four ecumenical councils are recognized by the Lutheran churches, Anglican Communion and Reformed churches though they are "considered subordinate to Scripture". The Assyrian Church of the East acknowledges the first two ecumenical councils, while Oriental Orthodox Churches accept the first three ecumenical councils.

== Historic divisions in Christianity ==
=== Christian denominations today ===
Christianity has not been a monolithic faith since the first century, also known as the "Apostolic Age", and in the present day, a number of widely varied Christian groups exist, both within and without mainstream Christianity. Despite the division between these groups, a number of commonalities exist throughout their traditions, understanding of theology, governing church systems, doctrine and language. As such, many of these groups are visibly divided into different communions or denominations, groupings of Christians and their churches in full communion with one another, but to some degree set apart from other Christians.

The World Council of Churches counts 348 member churches, representing more than half a billion members of the major Christian traditions. This, with the Catholic Church's 1.25 billion Christians, indicates that 349 churches/denominations already account for nearly 80% of the world's Christian population.

One problem with the larger numbers is that single denominations can be counted multiple times. For example, the Catholic Church is a single church, or communion, comprising 24 distinct self-governing particular churches in full communion with the bishop of Rome (the largest being the Latin Church, commonly called "Roman Catholic"). Further, the Catholic Church's presence in each country is counted as a different denomination—though this is in no way an ecclesiologically accurate definition. This can result in the one Catholic Church being counted as 242 distinct denominations, as in the World Christian Encyclopedia.

Additionally, single nondenominational congregations or megachurches without denominational affiliation are effectively counted each as its own denomination, resulting in cases where entire "denominations" may account for only a handful of people. Other denominations may be very small remnants of once larger churches. The United Society of Believers in Christ's Second Appearing (Shakers) have only two full members, for example, yet are a distinct denomination.

Most current divisions are the result of historical schisms—a break in the full communion between previously united churches, bishops, or communities. Some historical schisms proved temporary and were eventually healed, others have hardened into the denominations of today. However individual denominations are counted, it is generally acknowledged that they fall into the following major "families" of churches (though certain parts of some Christian denominations, such as Quakerism, may fall into the mainline category though the majority are evangelical Quakers):

- The Eastern Orthodox Church, the Oriental Orthodox Churches, and the Church of the East;
- The Catholic Church (the Catholic Church is a hierarchical religious institution of universal scope, and sees itself and proclaims itself as the one commissioned by Jesus Christ to help walk the spiritual path to God);
- Mainline Protestant (including the Lutheran churches, Moravian Church, Anglican Communion, Reformed churches, Waldensian churches, among others) and Old Catholic churches;
- Evangelical (including the Baptist, Methodist and Plymouth Brethren churches) and Pentecostal churches;
- Restorationist sects (Irvingians, Swedenborgians, Latter-day Saints, Jehovah's Witnesses, Christadelphians, La Luz del Mundo, Iglesia ni Cristo etc.) (Non-Nicene Christianity)

In the United States, the historic racial/ethnic churches are sometimes counted as a distinct family of churches, though they may otherwise fit into any one of the previous categories.

Some of these families are in themselves a single communion, such as the Catholic Church. Other families are a very general movement with no universal governing authority. Protestantism, for example, includes such diverse groups as Adventists, Anabaptists, Baptists, Congregationalists, Evangelicals, Hussites, Lutherans, Messianic Jews, Methodists (inclusive of the Holiness movement), Moravians, Pentecostals, Presbyterians, Reformed, and Waldensians. Many of these have, as a result of ecumenical dialogue, established full or partial communion agreements.

=== Ancient apostolic churches ===
The oldest lasting schism in Christianity resulted from fifth-century disagreements on Christology, heightened by philosophical, linguistic, cultural, and political differences.

The first significant, lasting split in historic Christianity, the so-called Nestorian Schism, came from the Church of the East, consisting largely of Eastern Syriac churches outside the Roman Empire, who left full communion after 431 in response to misunderstandings and personality conflicts at the Council of Ephesus. After fifteen centuries of estrangement, the Assyrian Church of the East and the Catholic Church entered into an ecumenical dialogue in the 1980s, resulting in agreement on the very issue that split them asunder, in the 1994 Common Christological Declaration, which identifies the origin of the schism as largely linguistic, due to problems of translating very delicate and precise terminology from Latin to Aramaic and vice versa.

As part of the then-ongoing Christological controversy, following the Council of Chalcedon in 451, the next large split came with the Syriac and Coptic churches dividing themselves. The churches dissented from Chalcedon, becoming today's Oriental Orthodox Churches. These also include the Armenian Apostolic Church, the Ethiopian Orthodox Tewahedo Church, and the Malankara Orthodox Syrian Church in India. In modern times, there have also been moves towards healing this division, with common Christological statements being made between Pope John Paul II and Syriac patriarch Ignatius Zakka I Iwas, as well as between representatives of both Oriental Orthodoxy and the Eastern Orthodox Church.

=== Great Schism ===
Although the Christian world as a whole did not experience any major church divisions for centuries afterward, the Eastern, predominantly Greek-speaking and Western, predominantly Latin-speaking, cultural divisions drifted toward isolation, culminating in the mutual excommunication of Patriarch of Constantinople Michael I Cerularius and the legate of then-deceased Pope of Rome Leo IX in 1054, in what is known as the Great Schism. The canonical separation was sealed by the Latin sacking of Constantinople (1204) during the Fourth Crusade and through the poor reception of the Council of Florence (1449) among the Orthodox Eastern churches.

The political and theological reasons for the schism are complex. Aside from the natural rivalry between the Eastern Roman or Byzantine Empire and the Franco-Latin Holy Roman Empire, one major controversy was the inclusion and acceptance in the West in general—and in the diocese of Rome in particular—of the Filioque clause ("and the Son") into the Nicene-Constantinopolitan Creed, which the East viewed as a violation of ecclesiastical procedure at best, an abuse of papal authority as only an Ecumenical Council could amend what had been defined by a previous council, and a heresy at worst, inasfar as the Filioque implies that the essential divinity of the Holy Spirit is derived not from the Father alone as arche (singular head and source), but from the perichoretic union between the Father and the Son. That the hypostasis or persona of the Spirit either is or is produced by the mutual, pre-eternal love between God and His Word is an explanation which Eastern Christian detractors have alleged is rooted in the medieval Augustinian appropriation of Plotinian Neoplatonism. (See Augustine of Hippo, De Trinitate.)

Both West and East agreed that the patriarch of Rome was owed a "primacy of honour" by the other patriarchs (those of Alexandria, Antioch, Constantinople and Jerusalem), but the West also contended that this primacy extended to jurisdiction, a position rejected by the Eastern patriarchs. Various attempts at dialogue between the two groups would occur, but it was only in the 1960s, under Pope Paul VI and Patriarch Athenagoras, that significant steps began to be made to mend the relationship between the two. In 1965, the excommunications were "committed to oblivion".

The resulting division remains, however, providing the Catholic Church and the Eastern Orthodox Church, both of which are globally distributed bodies and no longer restricted geographically or culturally to the "West" or "East", respectively. (There exist both Eastern Rite Roman Catholicism and Western Rite Orthodoxy, for example.) There is an ongoing and fruitful Catholic-Orthodox dialogue.

=== Western schisms and reformations ===
In Western Christianity, there were a handful of geographically isolated movements that preceded in the spirit of the Protestant Reformation. The Cathars were a very strong movement in medieval southwestern France, but did not survive into modern times, largely as a result of the Albigensian Crusade. In northern Italy and southeastern France, Peter Waldo founded the Waldensians in the 12th century, which remains the largest non-Catholic church in Italy and is in full communion with the Italian Methodist Church. In Bohemia, a movement in the early 15th century by Jan Hus called the Hussites called for reform of Catholic teaching and still exists to this day, known as the Moravian Church. Though generally counted among Protestant churches, groups such as the Waldensians and Moravians pre-exist Protestantism proper.

The Protestant Reformation began, symbolically, with the posting of Martin Luther's "Ninety-Five Theses" in Saxony on October 31, 1517, written as a set of grievances to reform the Western Church. Luther's writings, combined with the work of Swiss theologian Huldrych Zwingli and French theologian and politician John Calvin, sought to reform existing problems in doctrine and practice. Due to the reactions of ecclesiastical office holders at the time of the reformers, the Catholic Church separated from them, instigating a rift in Western Christianity. This schism created the Mainline Protestant churches, including especially the Lutheran and Reformed traditions.

In England, Henry VIII of England declared himself to be supreme head of the Church of England with the Act of Supremacy in 1531, repressing both Lutheran reformers and those loyal to the pope. Thomas Cranmer as Archbishop of Canterbury introduced the English Reformation in a form compromising between the Calvinists and Lutherans, being theologically Reformed though drawing close to Lutherans in liturgy. This schism created today's Anglican Communion.

The Radical Reformation, also mid-sixteenth century, moved beyond the Magisterial Reformation, emphasizing the invisible, spiritual reality of the Church, apart from any visible ecclesial manifestation. A significant group of Radical reformers were the Anabaptists, people such as Menno Simons and Jakob Ammann, whose movements resulted in today's communities of Mennonites, Amish, Hutterites, and Brethren churches, and to some extent, the Bruderhof Communities.

Further reform movements within Anglicanism during the 16th through 18th centuries, with influence from the Radical Reformation, produced the Puritans and Separatists, creating today's Baptists, Congregationalists, Quakers, and eventually Unitarian Universalism.

The Methodist churches, which uphold Wesleyan-Arminian theology, grew out of a revival within Anglicanism, especially in England and the American colonies, under the leadership of the brothers John Wesley and Charles Wesley, both priests in the Church of England. Within Methodism arose the holiness movement; while the majority of those aligned with the holiness movement remained within major Methodist denominations, new denominations were formed too.

The Old Catholic Church split from the Catholic Church in the 1870s because of the promulgation of the dogma of Papal Infallibility as promoted by the First Vatican Council of 1869–1870. The term "Old Catholic" was first used in 1853 to describe the members of the See of Utrecht who were not under Papal authority. The Old Catholic movement grew in America but has not maintained ties with Utrecht, although talks are under way between some independent Old Catholic bishops and Utrecht.

The Evangelical movement takes form as the result of spiritual renewal efforts in the anglophone world in the 18th century. According to religion scholar, social activist, and politician Randall Balmer, Evangelicalism resulted "from the confluence of Pietism, Presbyterianism, and the vestiges of Puritanism. Evangelicalism picked up the peculiar characteristics from each strain—warmhearted spirituality from the Pietists (for instance), doctrinal precisionism from the Presbyterians, and individualistic introspection from the Puritans". Historian Mark Noll adds to this list High Church Anglicanism, which contributed to Evangelicalism a legacy of "rigorous spirituality and innovative organization".

Pentecostalism is likewise born out of this context, and traditionally traces its origins to what it describes as an outpouring of the Holy Spirit on 1 January 1901 in Topeka, Kansas, at the Bethel Bible College. Subsequent charismatic revivals in Wales in 1904 and the Azusa Street Revival in 1906 are held as the beginnings of the Pentecostal movement. These started just a few hours after Pope Leo XIII led a prayer Veni Spiritus Sanctus during an Urbi et Orbi message, consecrating the 20th century to the Holy Spirit and through this prayer to the reunion of Christianity.

== Three approaches to Christian unity ==
For some Protestants, spiritual unity, and often unity on the church's teachings on central issues, suffices. According to Lutheran theologian Edmund Schlink, most important in Christian ecumenism is that people focus primarily on Christ, not on separate church organizations. In Schlink's book Ökumenische Dogmatik (1983), he says Christians who see the risen Christ at work in the lives of various Christians or in diverse churches realize that the unity of Christ's church has never been lost, but has instead been distorted and obscured by different historical experiences and by spiritual myopia. Both are overcome in renewed faith in Christ. Included in that is responding to his admonition (John 17; Philippians 2) to be one in him and love one another as a witness to the world. The result of mutual recognition would be a discernible worldwide fellowship, organized in a historically new way.

For a significant part of the Christian world, one of the highest goals to be sought is the reconciliation of the various denominations by overcoming the historical divisions within Christianity. Even where there is broad agreement upon this goal, approaches to ecumenism vary. Generally, Protestants see fulfillment of the goal of ecumenism as consisting in general agreements on teachings about central issues of faith, with mutual pastoral accountability between the diverse churches regarding the teachings of salvation.

For Catholics and Orthodox on the other hand, the true unity of Christendom is treated in accordance with their more sacramental understanding of the Body of Christ; this ecclesiastical matter for them is closely linked to key theological issues (e.g. regarding the Eucharist and the historical Episcopate), and requires full dogmatic assent to the pastoral authority of the Church for full communion to be considered viable and valid. Thus, there are different answers even to the question of the church, which finally is the goal of the ecumenist movement itself. However, the desire of unity is expressed by many denominations, generally that all who profess faith in Christ in sincerity, would be more fully cooperative and supportive of one another.

For the Catholic and Orthodox churches, the process of approaching one another can be described as formally split in two successive stages: the "dialogue of love" and the "dialogue of truth". Examples of acts belonging to the former include the mutual revocation in 1965 of the anathemas of 1054, returning the relics of Sabbas the Sanctified (a common saint) to Mar Saba in the same year, and the first visit of a Pope to an Orthodox country in a millennium (Pope John Paul II accepting the invitation of the Patriarch of the Romanian Orthodox Church, Teoctist, in 1999), among others.

Christian ecumenism can be described in terms of the three largest divisions of Christianity: Roman Catholic, Eastern Orthodox, and Protestant. While this underemphasizes the complexity of these divisions, it is a useful model.

=== Catholicism ===
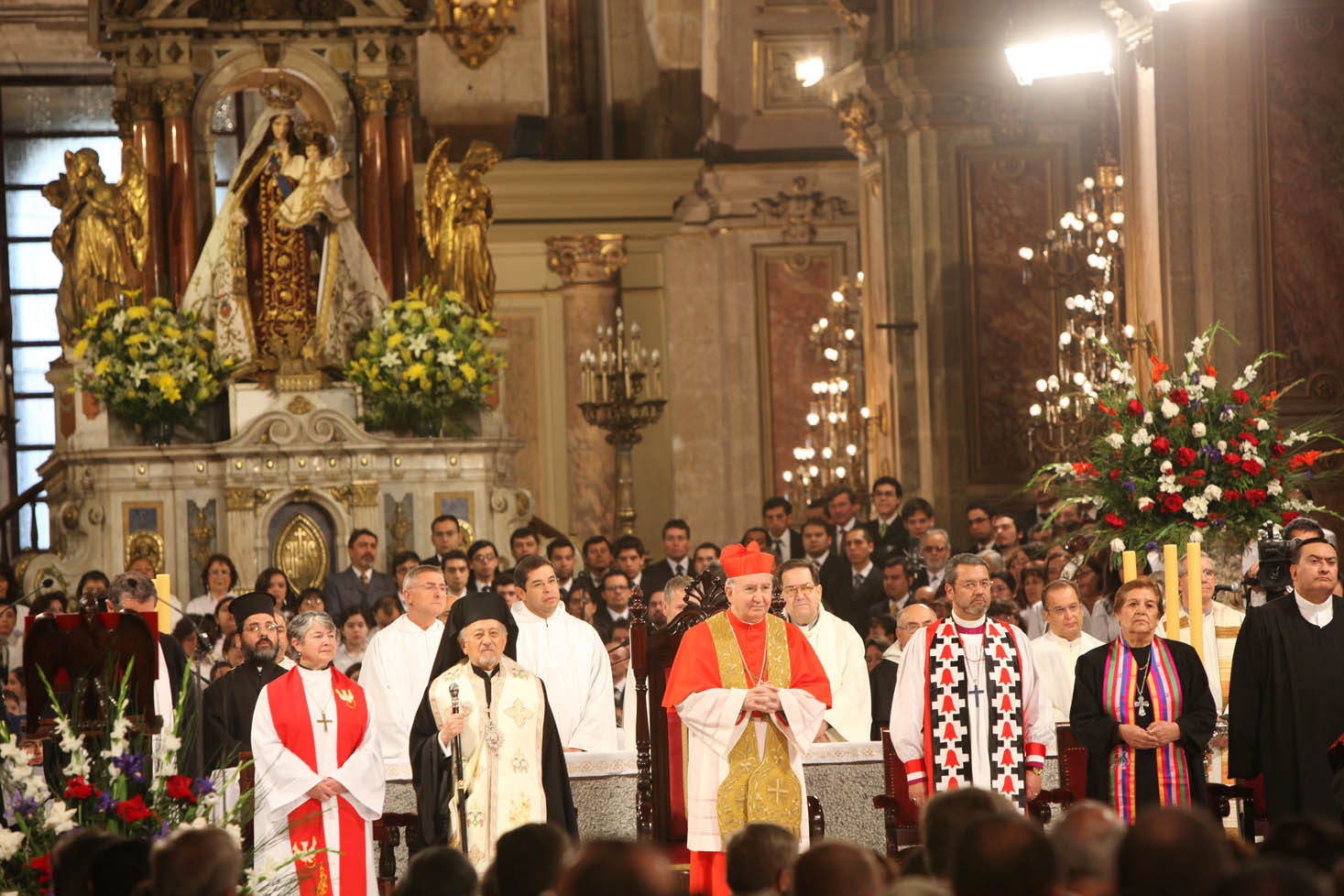
Te Deum Ecuménico 2009 in the Santiago Metropolitan Cathedral, Chile. An ecumenical gathering of clergy from different denominations.

The Catholic Church has always considered it a duty of the highest rank to seek full unity with estranged communions of fellow Christians and, at the same time, to reject what it sees as a false union which would mean being unfaithful to or glossing over the teaching of sacred scripture and tradition. Moreover, the Catholic Church recognizes itself as the one true Church founded by Christ, and that this unity is "something she can never lose", due to the guarantee of Christ (a doctrine known as the "indefectibility of the Church"). Accordingly, from a Catholic point of view, all ecumenism is aimed at a return of separated ecclesial communities to the Catholic Church, which already has the unity, holiness, catholicity, and apostolicity which mark it as the singular true Church (see Four Marks of the Church). Because of this, the notion of the goal of ecumenical activity is very different from the form of unity sought by other groups, particularly Protestant groups which have a radically different ecclesiology.

Before the Aggiornamento or "updating" of the Second Vatican Council, the main stress was laid on this second aspect, as exemplified in canon 1258 of the 1917 Code of Canon Law:

1. It is illicit for the faithful to assist at or participate in any way in non-Catholic religious functions.
2. For a serious reason requiring, in case of doubt, the Bishop's approval, passive or merely material presence at non-Catholic funerals, weddings and similar occasions because of holding a civil office or as a courtesy can be tolerated, provided there is no danger of perversion or scandal.

The 1983 Code of Canon Law has no corresponding canon. It absolutely forbids Catholic priests to concelebrate the Eucharist with members of communities which are not in full communion (canon 908), but allows, in certain circumstances and under certain conditions, other sharing in the sacraments. The Directory for the Application of Principles and Norms on Ecumenism, 102 states: "Christians may be encouraged to share in spiritual activities and resources, i.e., to share that spiritual heritage they have in common in a manner and to a degree appropriate to their present divided state."

Pope John XXIII, who convoked the council that brought this change of emphasis about, said that the council's aim was to seek renewal of the church itself, which would serve, for those separated from the See of Rome, as a "gentle invitation to seek and find that unity for which Jesus Christ prayed so ardently to his heavenly Father". Pope Paul VI, in his 1964 encyclical letter Ecclesiam Suam observed that "ecumenical dialogue, as it is called, is already in being, and there are places where it is beginning to make considerable progress".

Some elements of the Catholic perspective on ecumenism are illustrated in the following quotations from the council's decree on ecumenism, Unitatis Redintegratio of 21 November 1964, and Pope John Paul II's encyclical, Ut Unum Sint of 25 May 1995.

Every renewal of the Church is essentially grounded in an increase of fidelity to her own calling. Undoubtedly this is the basis of the movement toward unity … There can be no ecumenism worthy of the name without a change of heart. For it is from renewal of the inner life of our minds, from self-denial and an unstinted love that desires of unity take their rise and develop in a mature way. We should therefore pray to the Holy Spirit for the grace to be genuinely self-denying, humble, gentle in the service of others, and to have an attitude of brotherly generosity towards them. … The words of St. John hold good about sins against unity: "If we say we have not sinned, we make him a liar, and his word is not in us". So we humbly beg pardon of God and of our separated brethren, just as we forgive them that trespass against us.

Christians cannot underestimate the burden of long-standing misgivings inherited from the past, and of mutual misunderstandings and prejudices. Complacency, indifference and insufficient knowledge of one another often make this situation worse. Consequently, the commitment to ecumenism must be based upon the conversion of hearts and upon prayer, which will also lead to the necessary purification of past memories. With the grace of the Holy Spirit, the Lord's disciples, inspired by love, by the power of the truth and by a sincere desire for mutual forgiveness and reconciliation, are called to re-examine together their painful past and the hurt which that past regrettably continues to provoke even today.

In ecumenical dialogue, Catholic theologians standing fast by the teaching of the Church and investigating the divine mysteries with the separated brethren must proceed with love for the truth, with charity, and with humility. When comparing doctrines with one another, they should remember that in Catholic doctrine there exists a "hierarchy" of truths, since they vary in their relation to the fundamental Christian faith. Thus the way will be opened by which through fraternal rivalry all will be stirred to a deeper understanding and a clearer presentation of the unfathomable riches of Christ.

The unity willed by God can be attained only by the adherence of all to the content of revealed faith in its entirety. In matters of faith, compromise is in contradiction with God who is Truth. In the Body of Christ, "the way, and the truth, and the life" (Jn 14:6), who could consider legitimate a reconciliation brought about at the expense of the truth?...Even so, doctrine needs to be presented in a way that makes it understandable to those for whom God himself intends it.

When the obstacles to perfect ecclesiastical communion have been gradually overcome, all Christians will at last, in a common celebration of the Eucharist, be gathered into the one and only Church in that unity which Christ bestowed on his Church from the beginning. We believe that this unity subsists in the Catholic Church as something she can never lose, and we hope that it will continue to increase until the end of time.

While some Eastern Orthodox churches commonly rebaptize converts from the Catholic Church, thereby refusing to recognize the baptism that the converts have previously received, the Catholic Church has always accepted the validity of all the sacraments administered by the Eastern Orthodox and Oriental Orthodox churches.

The Catholic Church likewise has very seldom applied the terms "heterodox" or "heretic" to the Eastern Orthodox churches or its members, although there are clear differences in doctrine, notably about the authority of the Pope, Purgatory, and the filioque clause. More often, the term "separated" or "schismatic" has been applied to the state of the Eastern Orthodox churches.

=== Orthodoxy ===
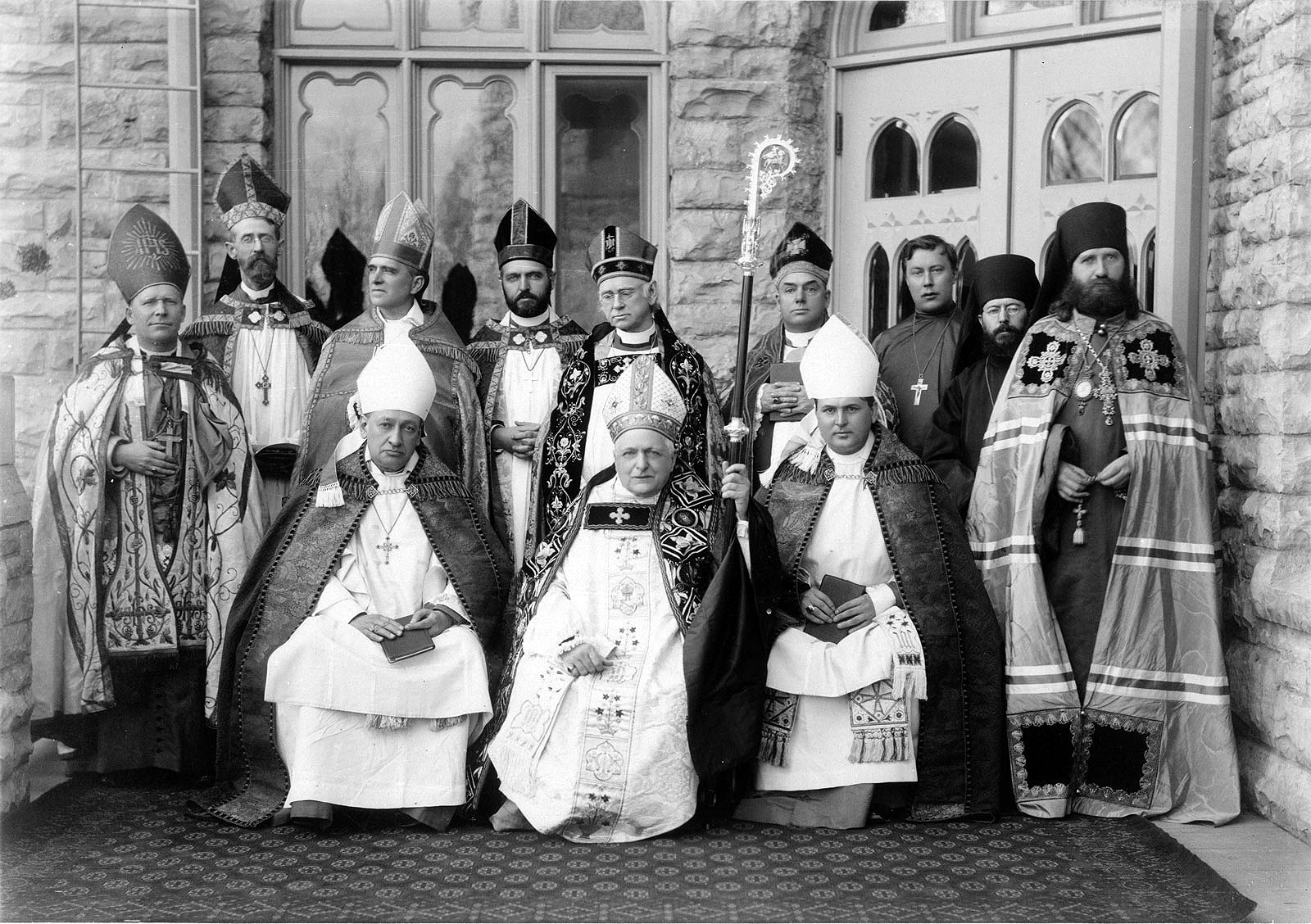
The consecration of Reginald Heber Weller as an Anglican bishop at the Cathedral of St. Paul the Apostle in the Protestant Episcopal Diocese of Fond du Lac, with the Rt. Rev. Anthony Kozlowski of the Polish National Catholic Church and the Patriarch Tikhon of Moscow (along with his chaplains John Kochurov, and Fr. Sebastian Dabovich) of the Russian Orthodox Church present

The Oriental Orthodox and Eastern Orthodox churches are two distinct bodies of local churches. The churches within each body share full communion, although there is not official communion between the two bodies. Both consider themselves to be the original church, from which the West was divided in the 5th and 11th centuries, respectively (after the 3rd and 7th Ecumenical councils).

Many theologians of the Eastern Orthodox and Oriental Orthodox churches engage in theological dialogue with each other and with some of the Western churches, though short of full communion. The Eastern Orthodox have participated in the ecumenical movement, with students active in the World Student Christian Federation since the late 19th century. Most Eastern Orthodox and all Oriental Orthodox churches are members of the World Council of Churches. Kallistos of Diokleia, a bishop of the Eastern Orthodox Church has stated that ecumenism "is important for Orthodoxy: it has helped to force the various Orthodox Churches out of their comparative isolation, making them meet one another and enter into a living contact with non-Orthodox Christians."

Historically, the relationship between the Eastern Orthodox Church and the Anglican Communion has been congenial, with the Patriarch of Constantinople in 1922 recognising Anglican orders as valid. He wrote: "That the orthodox theologians who have scientifically examined the question have almost unanimously come to the same conclusions and have declared themselves as accepting the validity of Anglican Orders." Moreover, some Eastern Orthodox bishops have assisted in the ordination of Anglican bishops; for example, in 1870, the Most Reverend Alexander Lycurgus, the Greek Orthodox Archbishop of Syra and Tinos, was one of the bishops who consecrated Henry MacKenzie as the Suffragan Bishop of Nottingham. From 1910 to 1911, the era before World War I, Raphael of Brooklyn, an Eastern Orthodox bishop, "sanctioned an interchange of ministrations with the Episcopalians in places where members of one or the other communion are without clergy of their own". Bishop Raphael stated that in places "where there is no resident Orthodox Priest", an Anglican (Episcopalian) priest could administer Marriage, Holy Baptism, and the Blessed Sacrament to an Orthodox layperson. In 1912, however, Bishop Raphael ended the intercommunion after becoming uncomfortable with the fact that the Anglican Communion contained different churchmanships within it, e.g. High Church, Evangelical, etc. However, after World War I, the Fellowship of Saint Alban and Saint Sergius was organized in 1927, which much like the Anglican and Eastern Churches Association worked on ecumenism between the two Churches; both of these organisations continue their task today.

In accordance with the Soviet anti-religious legislation under the state atheism of the Soviet Union, several Russian Orthodox churches and seminaries were closed. With ecumenical aid from Methodists in the United States, two Russian Orthodox seminaries were reopened, and hierarchs of the Orthodox Church thankfully made the following statement: "The services rendered by the American Methodists and other Christian friends will go down in history of the Orthodox Church as one of its brightest pages in that dark and trying time of the church. Our Church will never forget the Samaritan service which your whole Church unselfishly rendered us. May this be the beginning of closer friendship for our churches and nations."

=== Protestantism ===
Protestants are involved in a variety of ecumenical groups, working in some cases toward organic denominational unity and in other cases for cooperative purposes alone. Because of the wide spectrum of Protestant denominations and perspectives, full cooperation has been difficult at times. Edmund Schlink's Ökumenische Dogmatik (1983, 1997) proposes a way through these problems to mutual recognition and renewed church unity.

==== Lutheranism ====
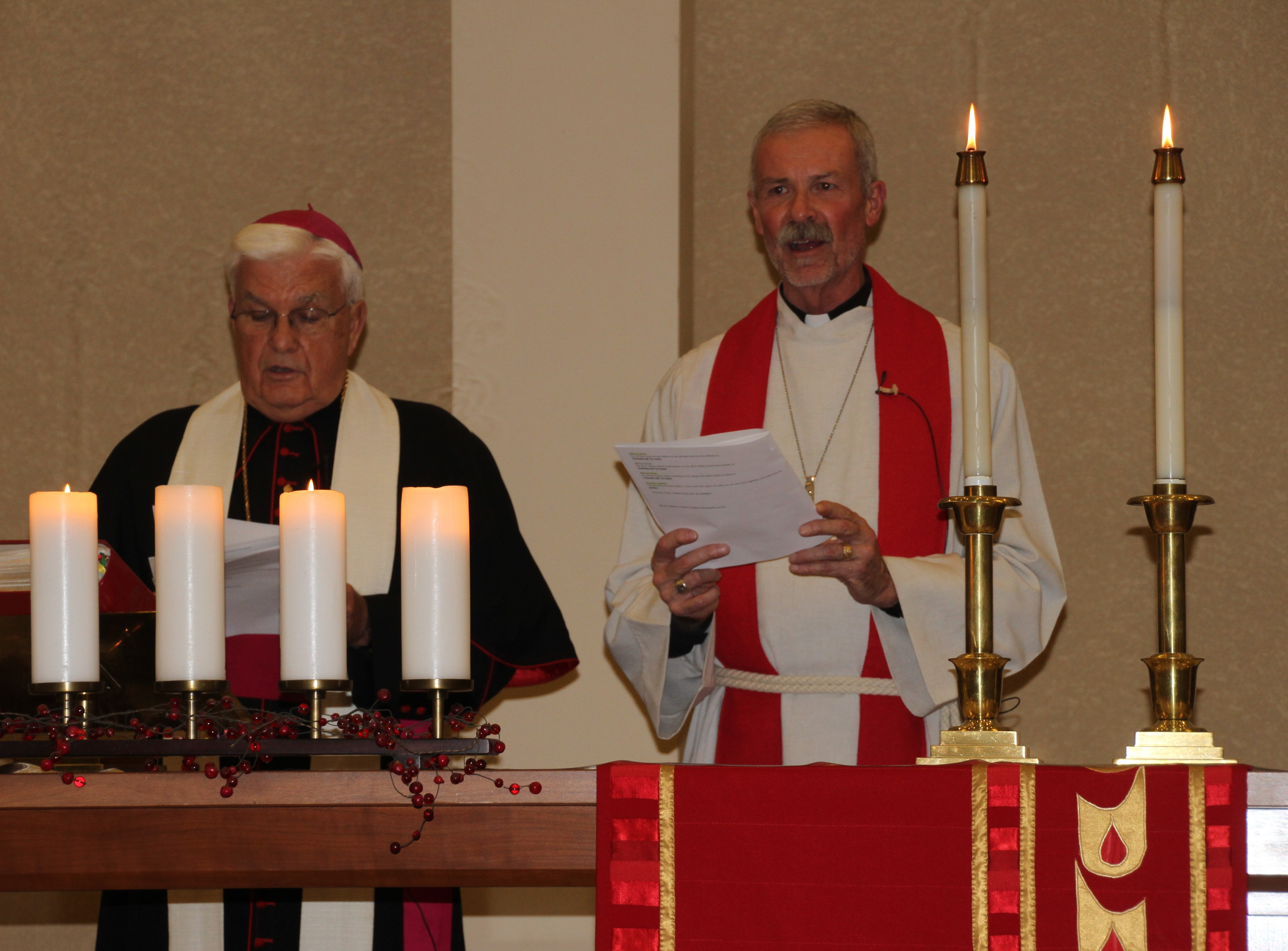
Bishop John M. Quinn of the Roman Catholic Diocese of Winona and Bishop Steven Delzer of Evangelical Lutheran Southeastern Minnesota Synod leading a Reformation Day service in 2017

The Lutheran World Federation has several ongoing dialogues with respect to ecumenism:

- Lutheran-Anglican
- Lutheran-Mennonite-Roman Catholic
- Lutheran-Orthodox
- Lutheran-Reformed
- Lutheran-Roman Catholic

In 1999, the representatives of Lutheran World Federation and Catholic Church signed the Joint Declaration on the Doctrine of Justification, resolving the conflict over the nature of Justification which was at the root of the Protestant Reformation. On 18 July 2006, delegates to the World Methodist Conference voted unanimously to adopt the Joint Declaration. The World Communion of Reformed Churches (representing the "80 million members of Congregational, Presbyterian, Reformed, United, Uniting, and Waldensian churches"), adopted the Declaration in 2017.

On Reformation Day in 2016, Pope Francis of the Catholic Church travelled to Sweden (where the Lutheran Church is the national Church) to commemorate the 500th anniversary of the Reformation at Lund Cathedral, which serves as the cathedra for the Bishop of Lund of the Church of Sweden, a Lutheran church. An official press release from the Holy See stated:

The Lutheran World Federation (LWF) and Roman Catholic Church joint event will highlight the 50 years of continuous ecumenical dialogue between Catholics and Lutherans and the joint gifts of this collaboration. The Catholic-Lutheran commemoration of 500 years of the Reformation is structured around the themes of thanksgiving, repentance and commitment to common witness. The aim is to express the gifts of the Reformation and ask forgiveness for division perpetuated by Christians from the two traditions.

An ecumenical service was presided over by Bishop Munib Younan, the president of the Lutheran World Federation, Martin Junge, the General Secretary of the LWF, as well as Pope Francis, the leader of the Catholic Church. Representatives from the Anglican Communion, Baptist World Alliance, Eastern Orthodox Church, and Salvation Army also participated in the predominantly Lutheran and Roman Catholic event. Pope Francis, in a joint statement with Bishop Munib A. Younan, stated that "With gratitude we acknowledge that the Reformation helped give a greater centrality to sacred Scripture in the Church's life".

Susan Wood, a Sister of Charity, who is a systematic theology professor and chair of the theology department at Marquette University and a former president of the Catholic Theological Society of America, stated that "Since Vatican II, we have acknowledged an imperfect communion between Lutheran and Catholics" and that "There is no substantial difference in Lutheran and Catholic belief in the real presence of Christ in the Eucharist". Wood stated that in the near future intercommunion could happen in places "where people can't get out, like nursing homes and prisons."

The Porvoo Communion is a communion that established altar and pulpit fellowship between churches of the Lutheran and Anglican tradition.

==== Anglicanism ====
The members of the Anglican Communion have generally embraced the Ecumenical Movement, actively participating in such organizations as the World Council of Churches and the National Council of the Churches of Christ in the USA. Most provinces holding membership in the Anglican Communion have special departments devoted to ecumenical relations; however, the influence of Liberal Christianity has in recent years caused tension within the communion, causing some to question the direction ecumenism has taken them.

Each member church of the Anglican Communion makes its own decisions with regard to intercommunion. The 1958 Lambeth Conference recommended "that where between two Churches not of the same denominational or confessional family, there is unrestricted communio in sacris, including mutual recognition and acceptance of ministries, the appropriate term to use is 'full communion', and that where varying degrees of relation other than 'full communion' are established by agreement between two such churches the appropriate term is 'intercommunion'."

Full communion has been established between provinces of the Anglican Communion and these churches:

- Union of Utrecht of Old Catholic Churches
- Philippine Independent Church
- Mar Thoma Syrian Church of Malabar
- Evangelical Lutheran Church in America
- Moravian Church in America, Northern and Southern Provinces

Full communion has been established between the Anglican Churches of Europe (England, Wales, Scotland, Ireland, Spain, Portugal and Gibraltar in Europe) and the Lutheran churches of Northern Europe (Norway, Sweden, Denmark, Finland, Iceland, Estonia, Lithuania, Great Britain and the Latvian Evangelical Lutheran Church Abroad) with the Porvoo Communion.

The Episcopal Church is currently engaged in dialogue with the following religious bodies:

- Churches Uniting in Christ (CUIC)
- Eastern Orthodox Church
- Catholic Church
- Presbyterian Church USA
- United Methodist Church
- Reformed Episcopal Church and the Anglican Province of America

Worldwide, an estimated forty million Anglicans belong to churches that do not participate in the Anglican Communion, a particular organization limited to one province per country. In these Anglican churches, there is strong opposition to the ecumenical movement and to membership in such bodies as the World and National Councils of Churches. Most of these churches are associated with the Continuing Anglican movement or the movement for Anglican realignment. While ecumenicalism in general is opposed, certain Anglican church bodies that are not members of the Anglican Communion—the Free Church of England and the Church of England in South Africa, for example—have fostered close and cooperative relations with other evangelical (if non-Anglican) churches, on an individual basis.

== Modern ecumenical movement ==
One understanding of the ecumenical movement is that it came from the Catholic Church's attempts to reconcile with Christians who had become separated over theological issues. Others see the 1910 World Missionary Conference as the birthplace of the ecumenical movement. Others yet point to the 1920 encyclical of the Eastern Orthodox Ecumenical Patriarch Germanus V "To the Churches of Christ Everywhere" that suggested a "fellowship of churches" similar to the League of Nations.

Earlier, Nicolaus Ludwig, Count von Zinzendorf (1700–1760), the renewer of the Moravian Church in the 18th century, was the first person to use the word "ecumenical" in this sense. His pioneering efforts to unite all Christians, regardless of denominational labels, into a "Church of God in the Spirit"—notably among German immigrants in Pennsylvania—were misunderstood by his contemporaries.

The founding of the London Missionary Society, a missionary society, occurred in 1795 by various evangelical denominations who had an interdenominational vision of the mission. It developed with the founding of the Evangelical Alliance in 1846 in London, England, by 52 evangelical denominations. Various other evangelical organizations have also contributed to the interdenominational movement. In the Biblical studies, there was the International Fellowship of Evangelical Students in 1947. In the area of Christian humanitarian aid, World Vision International was established in 1950. There was also the emergence of various interdenominational Bible colleges. In 1951, the World Evangelical Alliance (formerly the World Evangelical Fellowship) was founded by evangelical leaders from 21 countries at the first general assembly in Woudschoten (Zeist) in Netherlands.

Nathan Söderblom, Archbishop of Uppsala, the head of the Lutheran Church of Sweden, is known as the architect of the ecumenical movement of the twentieth century. During the First World War, he called on all Christian leaders to work for peace and justice. His leadership of the Christian "Life and Work" movement in the 1920s has led him to be recognised as one of the principal founders of the ecumenical movement. He was instrumental in chairing the World Conference of Life and Work in Stockholm, Sweden in 1925. At the Stockholm Conference in 1925, the culminating event in Söderblom's ecumenical work, Protestant and Orthodox Christians from the major Christian denominations, such as the Lutheran and Anglican churches, were all present and participating, with the exception of the Catholic Church. He was a close friend of the English ecumenist George Bell. In 1930, Söderblom was one of the recipients of the Nobel Prize for promoting Christian unity and helping create 'that new attitude of mind which is necessary if peace between nations is to become reality'. He was first clergyman to receive a Nobel prize.

The contemporary ecumenical movement gained speed through the 1910 Edinburgh Missionary Conference. However this conference would not have been possible without the pioneering ecumenical work of the Christian youth movements: the Young Men's Christian Association (founded 1844), the Young Women's Christian Association (founded 1855), the World Student Christian Federation (founded 1895), and the Federal Council of Churches (founded 1908), predecessor to today's National Council of Churches USA. Led by Methodist layman John R. Mott (former YMCA staff and in 1910 the General Secretary of WSCF), the World Mission conference marked the largest Protestant gathering to that time, with the express purposes of working across denominational lines for the sake of world missions. After the First World War further developments were the "Faith and Order" movement led by Charles Henry Brent, and the "Life and Work" movement led by Nathan Soderblom. In the 1930s, the tradition of an annual World Communion Sunday to celebrate ecumenical ties was established in the Presbyterian Church and was subsequently adopted by several other denominations. In this era, in 1886, the International Order of the King's Daughters and Sons was founded through which Christians belonging to various denominations undertook service work for the poor together as members of an ecumenical fraternal order.

After World War II, which had brought much devastation to many people, the church became a source of hope to those in need. In 1948, the first meeting of the World Council of Churches took place. Despite the fact that the meeting had been postponed due to World War II, the council took place in Amsterdam with the theme of "Man's Disorder and God's Design". The focus of the church and the council following the gathering was on the damage created by the Second World War. The council and the movement went forward to continue the efforts of unifying the church globally in the mission of helping all those in need, whether physical, emotional, or spiritual. The movement led to an understanding amongst the churches that, despite difference, they could join to be an element of great change, hope, and peace in the world. More importantly, the council and the movement lead to not only wider ecumenism but to the forming of councils amongst the denominations that connected churches across continental lines. Today, the World Council of Churches sees its role as sharing "the legacy of the one ecumenical movement and the responsibility to keep it alive" and acting "as a trustee for the inner coherence of the movement". Some scholars, such as Antoaneta Sabău, think that "the features that ecumenism may display today could testify against the idea of a diminished interest in ecumenical matters, and rather for the fact that essential concepts of ecumenism have already become integrative parts of contemporary theologies."

The rise of Marxism–Leninism, with its doctrine of state atheism, led to the persecution of Christians in the 20th century. Several Christian human rights NGOs were founded in order to support Christians of various denominations in affected areas, which laid "the groundwork for broader, more ecumenical initiatives". For example, International Christian Concern was founded in 1995 to assist Christians from all denominations who affirm the Apostle's Creed.

Several denominational bodies have a lead person who oversees and encourages ecumenical activity, whom they may call an "ecumenical officer".

== Contemporary developments ==
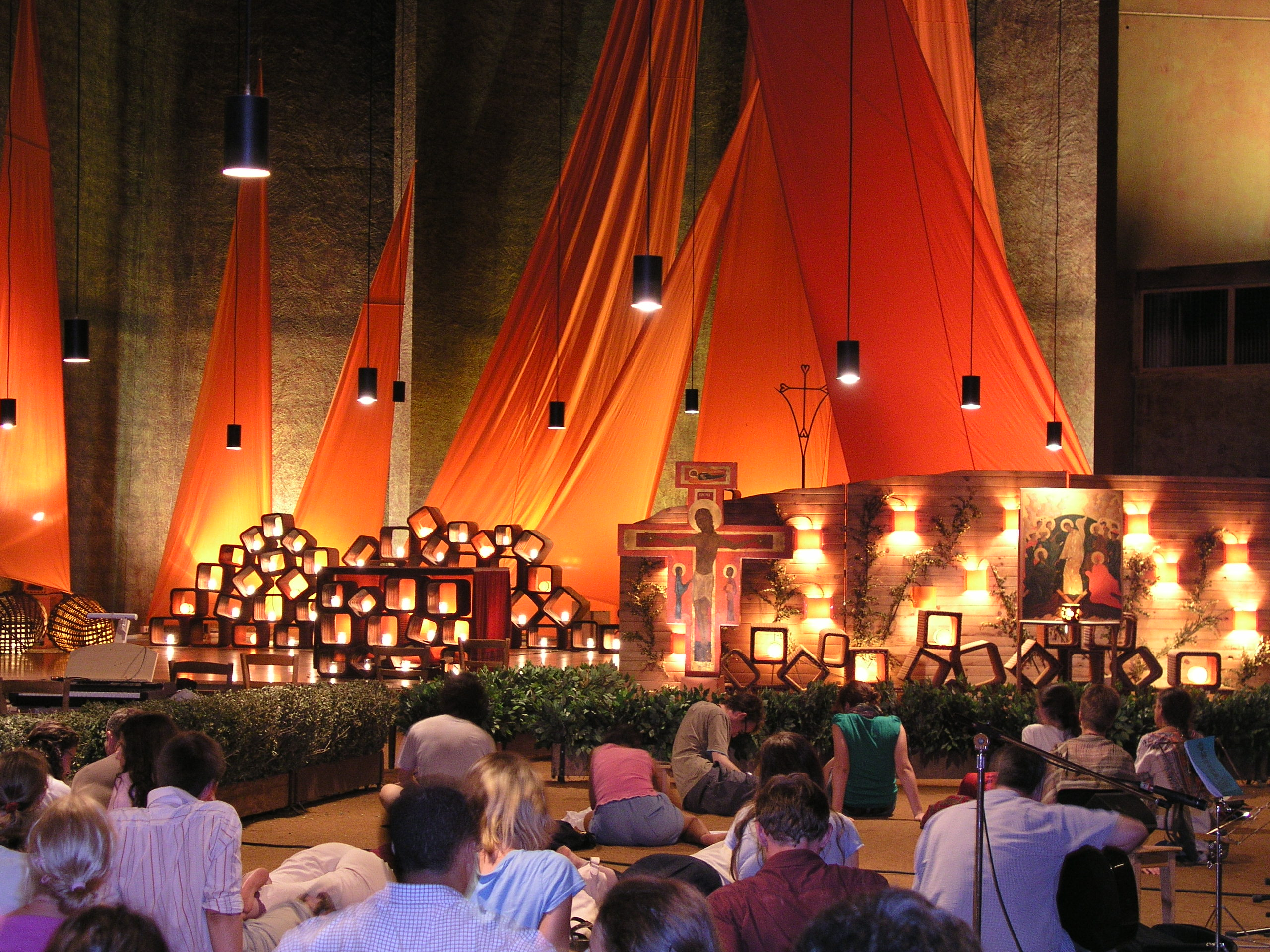
Ecumenical worship service at the monastery of Taizé

=== Catholic–Orthodox dialogue ===
The mutual anathemas (excommunications) of 1054, marking the Great Schism between Western (Catholic) and Eastern (Orthodox) branches of Christianity, a process spanning several centuries, were revoked in 1965 by Pope Paul VI and the Ecumenical Patriarch of Constantinople. The Catholic Church does not regard Orthodox Christians as excommunicated, since they personally have no responsibility for the separation of their churches. In fact, Catholic rules admit the Orthodox to communion and the other sacraments in situations where the individuals are in danger of death or no Orthodox churches exist to serve the needs of their faithful. However, Orthodox churches still generally regard Roman Catholics as excluded from the sacraments and some may even not regard Catholic sacraments such as baptism and ordination as valid.

In November 2006, Pope Benedict XVI traveled to Istanbul at the invitation of Patriarch Bartholomew I of Constantinople and participated in the feast day services of St. Andrew the First Apostle, the patron saint of the Church of Constantinople. The Ecumenical Patriarch and Pope Benedict had another historic meeting in Ravenna, Italy in 2007. The Declaration of Ravenna marked a significant rapprochement between the Roman Catholic and Orthodox positions. The declaration recognized the bishop of Rome as the Protos, or first among equals of the Patriarchs. This acceptance and the entire agreement was hotly contested by the Russian Orthodox Church. The signing of the declaration highlighted the pre-existing tensions between the Patriarch of Constantinople and the Moscow Patriarchate. Besides their theological concerns, the Russian Orthodox have continuing concerns over the question of the Eastern Catholic Churches that operate in what they regard as Orthodox territory. This question has been exacerbated by disputes over churches and other property that the Communist authorities once assigned to the Orthodox Church but whose restoration these churches have obtained from the present authorities.

A major obstacle to improved relations between the Orthodox and Catholic churches has been the insertion of the Latin term filioque into the Niceno-Constantinopolitan Creed in the 8th and 11th centuries. This obstacle has now been effectively resolved. The Catholic Church now recognizes that the Creed, as confessed at the First Council of Constantinople, did not add "and the Son", when it spoke of the Holy Spirit as proceeding from the Father. When quoting the Niceno-Constantinopolitan Creed, as in the 6 August 2000 document Dominus Iesus, it does not include filioque. It views as complementary the Eastern-tradition expression "who proceeds from the Father" (profession of which it sees as affirming that he comes from the Father through the Son) and the Western-tradition expression "who proceeds from the Father and the Son", with the Eastern tradition expressing firstly the Father's character as first origin of the Spirit, and the Western tradition giving expression firstly to the consubstantial communion between Father and Son; and it believes that, provided this legitimate complementarity does not become rigid, it does not affect the identity of faith in the reality of the same mystery confessed.

Continuing dialogues at both international and national level continues between the Roman Catholic and Orthodox churches. A particularly close relationship has grown up between Pope Francis and Ecumenical Patriarch Bartholomew. Both church leaders have in particular emphasized their common concern for refugees and persecuted Christians in the Middle East. The 2016 Pan-Orthodox Council that was held in Crete aroused great expectations for advances in ecclesial unity. However, not all Orthodox churches participated and, as a result, the Russian Patriarch refused to recognize the council as a truly ecumenical gathering. A major milestone in the growing rapprochement between the Catholic and Orthodox churches was the 12 February 2016 meeting held in Havana, Cuba between Patriarch Kirill and Pope Francis. The two church leaders issued a Joint Declaration of Pope Francis and Patriarch Kirill at the conclusion of their discussions.

=== Episcopal–Russian Orthodox dialogue ===
The decision by the U.S. Episcopal Church to ordain Gene Robinson, an openly gay, non-celibate priest who advocates same-sex blessings, as bishop led the Russian Orthodox Church to suspend its cooperation with the Episcopal Church. Likewise, when the Church of Sweden decided to bless same-sex marriages, the Russian Patriarchate severed all relations with the church, noting that "Approving the shameful practice of same-sex marriages is a serious blow to the entire system of European spiritual and moral values influenced by Christianity."

=== Inter-Christian ===
Bishop Hilarion Alfeyev commented that the inter-Christian community is "bursting at the seams". He sees the great dividing line—or "abyss"—not so much between old churches and church families as between "traditionalists" and "liberals", the latter now dominating Protestantism, and predicted that other Northern Protestant churches will follow suit and this means that the "ecumenical ship" will sink, for with the liberalism that is materializing in European Protestant churches, there is no longer anything to talk about.

Organizations such as the World Council of Churches, the National Council of Churches USA, Churches Uniting in Christ, Pentecostal Charismatic Peace Fellowship and Christian Churches Together continue to encourage ecumenical cooperation among Protestants, Eastern Orthodox, and, at times, Roman Catholics. There are universities such as the University of Bonn in Germany that offer degree courses in "Ecumenical Studies" in which theologians of various denominations teach their respective traditions and, at the same time, seek for common ground between these traditions.

The Global Christian Forum (GCF) was founded in 1998 following the proposal of the then General Secretary of the WCC, Rev. Konrad Raiser, that a new, independent space should be created where participants could meet on an equal basis to foster mutual respect and to explore and address together common concerns through a postmodern approach.

Influenced by the ecumenical movement, the "scandal of separation" and local developments, a number of United and uniting churches have formed; there are also a range of mutual recognition strategies being practiced where formal union is not feasible. An increasing trend has been the sharing of church buildings by two or more denominations, either holding separate services or a single service with elements of all traditions.

== Opposition to ecumenism ==
=== Catholics ===
Most Traditionalist Catholics (such as Society of Saint Pius X, Society of Saint Pius V, Congregation of Mary Immaculate Queen, Slaves of the Immaculate Heart of Mary etc.) are almost universally opposed to ecumenism with other faith groups. Critics in the Catholic church are often critical of Vatican II documents that promote ecumenism, such as Nostra aetate and Unitatis redintegratio. Catholic opponents to ecumenism often cite preceding papal documents such as Mortalium Animos (1928) by Pope Pius XI, who considered the position that the Church of Christ can be divided into sections and that the Unity of the Church has not been achieved as a false opinion. Considering these notions, Pius XI continued "[T]he Apostolic See cannot on any terms take part in [non-Catholic] assemblies, nor is it anyway lawful for Catholics either to support or to work for such enterprises; for if they do so they will be giving countenance to a false Christianity, quite alien to the one Church of Christ. Shall We suffer, what would indeed be iniquitous, the truth, and a truth divinely revealed, to be made a subject for compromise? For here there is question of defending revealed truth." Many traditional-leaning Catholics often strictly interpret the teaching of Extra Ecclesiam nulla salus ("outside the Church there is no salvation"), or that salvation can only be found in the Catholic Church.

In November 2015 Pope Francis stirred controversy among Catholics when he addressed a gathering of Lutherans in Rome regarding the issue of inter-communion. Addressing the issue as to whether a Lutheran woman married to a Catholic man and attended mass together could receive communion together, Francis said that while he could not give permission for her to receive communion, if she would pray about it and come forward he could not deny her communion. Cardinal Robert Sarah and Bishop Athanasius Schneider reacted to the pope's comments saying it would almost never be acceptable for a non-Catholic to receive communion. On the matter of inter-communion Sarah said "Inter-communion is not permitted between Catholics and non-Catholics. You must confess the Catholic Faith. A non-Catholic cannot receive Communion. That is very, very clear. It's not a matter of following your conscience."

In early 2019 Barry C. Knestout, the 13th bishop of the Roman Catholic Diocese of Richmond, gave permission to the Episcopal Diocese of Southern Virginia to ordain Susan B. Haynes as the new bishop at St. Bede Catholic Church in Williamsburg, Virginia. The Episcopal Diocese of Southern Virginia does not have a cathedral and usually rotates where it hosts ordinations and other events. However the announcement was met with opposition by many Catholics who objected to holding a non-Catholic worship service and women's bishop ordination in a Catholic church. Over 3,000 people signed an internet petition objecting to the event. On 17 January the Episcopal Diocese of Southern Virginia announced it would no longer hold Haynes' ordination at St. Bede.

=== Lutherans ===
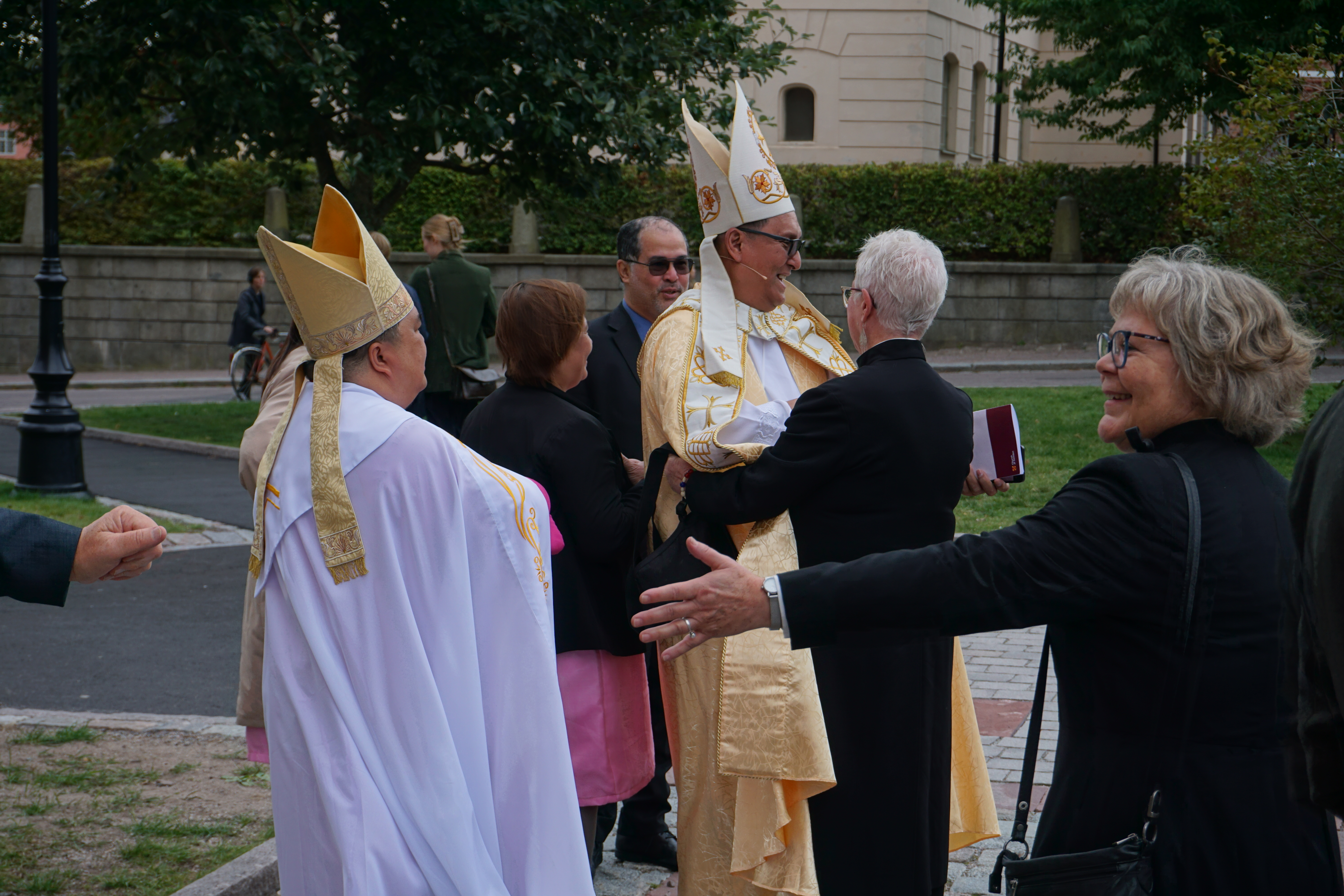
Lutheran priests and Aglipayan bishops embrace each other after a bishop consecration mass at Uppsala Cathedral in which the Philippine bishops participated. The Church of Sweden and the Philippine Independent Church are in full communion with each other since 1995.

Most churches following the doctrine of Confessional Lutheranism are generally strongly opposed to ecumenical activities. Most notably the Lutheran Church–Missouri Synod (LCMS) bars its clergy from worshiping with other faiths, contending "that church fellowship or merger between church bodies in doctrinal disagreement with one another is not in keeping with what the Bible teaches about church fellowship". In keeping with this position, a Connecticut LCMS pastor was asked to apologize by the president of the denomination, and did so, for participating in an interfaith prayer vigil for the 26 children and adults killed at a Newtown elementary school; and a LCMS pastor in New York was suspended for praying at an interfaith vigil in 2001, twelve days after the September 11 attacks.

=== Reformed Christians ===
When the Manhattan Declaration was released, many prominent Evangelical figures—particularly of the Reformed (Calvinist) tradition—opposed it, including John F. MacArthur, D. James Kennedy, Alistair Begg, and R. C. Sproul.

=== Anglicans/Episcopalians ===
William David Walker, who was the first bishop of North Dakota (1883–1896), and Western New York (1897–1917), was strongly opposed to dialogue with other denominations. In his address to the 1914 Convention of the Diocese of Western New York, Walker said that "in my opinion while divided Christendom remains, separated sects are better apart—each peaceably working out its own salvation."

=== Methodists ===
There are some members of the United Methodist Church who oppose ecumenical efforts which are "not grounded in the doctrines of the Church" due to concerns over theological compromise. For example, an article published in Catalyst Online: Contemporary Evangelical Perspectives for United Methodist Seminarians stated that false ecumenism might result in the "blurring of theological and confessional differences in the interests of unity".

The Evangelical Wesleyan Church, a Methodist connexion in the conservative holiness movement, teaches in its Book of Discipline that ecumenism with denominations that teach doctrines which contradict Wesleyan-Arminian theology should be avoided:

1. The church warns all its members that the doctrine of "eternal security" ("once in grace, always in grace," the absolute final perseverance of the saints,) is not in accord with the teachings of the Scriptures. The Word of God plainly teaches the possibility of apostasy and eternal damnation. The scriptural references, as alleged proofs favoring this doctrine, may be showing to rest upon an assumption in each case that the Word of God will not substance. Therefore, all our people should exercise extreme caution in regard to the "eternal security" movement, whose teachings have been such a detriment to true Scriptural holiness and productive of lives of "sinning religion" in many; especially should they guard against financial support to the same.
2. We further warn against the modern "unknown tongues" and "commercialized healing" movements. We believe that the Holy Ghost distributes His gifts, "dividing to every man severally as He will," for the purpose of edification; and that it is perilous to teach that any one manifestation of the Spirit is necessary to, or an invariable accompaniment of, any work of divine grace. None of our people should support or affiliate with these movements, for their teachings also have done untold damage to the spread of genuine holiness throughout the world.

=== Eastern Orthodox Christians ===
Practically, "the whole of Eastern Orthodoxy holds membership in the World Council of Churches". Ecumenical Patriarch Germanus V of Constantinople's 1920 letter '"To all the Churches of Christ, wherever they may be', urging closer co-operation among separated Christians, and suggesting a 'League of Churches', parallel to the newly founded League of Nations" was an inspiration for the founding of the World Council of Churches. As such "Constantinople, along with several of the other Orthodox Churches, was represented at the Faith and Order Conferences at Lausanne in 1927 and at Edinburgh in 1937. The Ecumenical Patriarchate also participated in the first Assembly of the WCC at Amsterdam in 1948, and has been a consistent supporter of the work of the WCC ever since."

Many Orthodox Christians support the cause of ecumenism as espoused by the Patriarch of Constantinople and their autocephalous Churches.

However, some of the Eastern Orthodox laity vehemently oppose ecumenism with other Christian denominations. Such people view ecumenism, as well as interfaith dialogue, as potentially pernicious to Eastern Orthodox Church tradition—as a "weakening" of Eastern Orthodoxy itself. In the Eastern Orthodox world, the Theological Committee of the Sacred Community of Mount Athos, arguably the most important center of Orthodox spirituality, has voiced its concerns regarding the ecumenist movement and has expressed opposition to the participation of the Eastern Orthodox Church. They regard modern ecumenism as compromising essential doctrinal stands in order to accommodate other Christians, and object to the emphasis on dialogue leading to intercommunion rather than conversion on the part of participants in ecumenical initiatives. Greek Old Calendarists also claim that the teachings of the Seven Ecumenical Councils forbid changing the church calendar through abandonment of the Julian calendar. The Inter-Eastern Orthodox Theological Conference entitled "Ecumenism: Origins, Expectations, Disenchantment", organized in September 2004 by the Aristotelian University of Thessaloniki, drew negative conclusions on ecumenism. Russian Orthodox bishop Tikhon (Shevkunov) has strongly criticised ecumenism, especially with the Catholic Church, saying "Catholics are not even a church and as a result not even Christian."

Fr. Timothy Evangelinidis of the Orthodox Research Institute notes, "Orthodoxy also sees itself in a fragile position within the Ecumenical Movement. It is neither completely at home within ecumenism, nor is closed to other Christian groups wishing to dialogue with it." Opposition to ecumenism in the Orthodox Church has its roots in the teachings of many modern-day saints and monastics. For example, the popular Greek Saint, Elder Ephraim of Katounakia (died 1998), said when asked about ecumenism, "I went to my cell and prayed, asking Christ to inform me what Ecumenism is. I received his reply, which was that Ecumenism has a spirit of wickedness and is dominated by unclean spirits." Similarly, the well-known Saint Paisios of Mount Athos (died 1994) gave many teachings about ecumenism. In a private letter to a priest named Fr. Haralambos on 23 January 1969, Elder Paisios wrote, "With sadness I must write that among all the unionists [ecumenists] I've met, never have I seen them to have either a drop or shred of spirituality." Opposition to ecumenism comes not only from the laity and from monastics, but also from the Orthodox clergy. The popular ROCOR metropolitan Philaret of New York (died 1985) wrote a series of three "sorrowful" epistles from 1969 to 1975 against ecumenism, in which he called ecumenism an error. The anti-ecumenical words of such prominent and highly-respected figures in the Orthodox Church garners attention from many members of the clergy and laity.

=== Seventh-day Adventism ===
Seventh-day Adventists express a visceral rejection of ecumenism —apparently linked to a traditional Adventist view of the Roman Catholic Church system.

== Ecumenical organizations ==
=== Councils of churches ===
- Action of Churches Together in Scotland
- Canadian Council of Churches
- Caribbean Conference of Churches
- Christian Churches Together in the USA
- Christian Conference of Asia
- Churches Together in Britain and Ireland
- Churches Together in England
- Communion of Churches in Indonesia
- Conference of European Churches
- Conference of Secretaries of World Christian Communions
- Council of Churches of Malaysia
- Fellowship of Christian Councils and Churches in the Great Lakes and Horn of Africa
- Fellowship of Christian Councils and Churches in West Africa
- Fellowship of Christian Councils and Churches of Central Africa
- Fellowship of Christian Councils in Southern Africa
- Fellowship of Middle East Evangelical Churches
- Hong Kong Christian Council
- Latin American Council of Churches
- Middle East Council of Churches
- Myanmar Council of Churches
- National Christian Council in Japan
- National Council of Churches in Bangladesh
- National Council of Churches in Korea
- National Council of Churches in the Philippines
- National Council of Churches of Nepal
- National Council of the Churches of Christ in the USA
- Pacific Conference of Churches
- World Council of Churches
- World Evangelical Alliance

=== Ecumenical institutes and offices ===
- Anglican and Eastern Churches Association
- Centro Pro Unione, Rome
- Canadian Centre for Ecumenism, Montreal (Canada)
- Churches Uniting in Christ, USA
- Ecumenical Institute for Study and Dialogue, Sri Lanka
- Fellowship of Saint Alban and Saint Sergius
- Groupe des Dombes
- Institute for Ecumenical Research, Strasbourg
- International Ecumenical Fellowship
- Irish School of Ecumenics, Dublin
- Joint Working Group between the Roman Catholic Church and the World Council of Churches
- North American Academy of Ecumenists
- North American Orthodox-Catholic Theological Consultation
- Porvoo Communion
- Pontifical Council for Promoting Christian Unity
- Seattle University School of Theology and Ministry
- Tantur Ecumenical Institute, Jerusalem
- Washington Theological Consortium

=== Ecumenical monastic communities and orders ===
- Benedictine Women of Madison
- Bose Monastic Community
- Focolare Movement
- Iona Community
- L'Arche
- Lay Community of St Benedict
- New Monasticism related Communities
- Order of Ecumenical Franciscans
- Order of Saint Lazarus
- Order of Saint Luke
- Priory of St. Wigbert
- Society of Ordained Scientists
- Taizé Community

=== Interdenominational ministries ===
- American Bible Society
- Church World Service
- Cru, formerly "Campus Crusade for Christ"
- Girls' Brigade
- Green Churches Network Canada
- Pentecostal Charismatic Peace Fellowship
- People of Praise
- Sabeel Ecumenical Liberation Theology Center
- Student Christian Movement (Britain)
- Week of Prayer for Christian Unity
- World Communion Sunday
- World Student Christian Federation
- Boys' Brigade

=== Political parties ===
The state atheism of the former Eastern Bloc, which brought about a persecution of Christians, caused a rise in Christian nationalism in the West, as well as ecumenical cooperation among Christians across denominational lines. For example, the United States, in 1956, adopted "In God We Trust" as its official motto "to differentiate itself from the Soviet Union, its Cold War enemy that was widely seen as promoting atheism." During this time, Christian human rights non-governmental organisations, such as Voice of the Martyrs, were founded in order to provide support to Christians persecuted in the Communist Bloc, also engaging in activities such as Bible smuggling. In the 1990s, the period surrounding the collapse of the Soviet Union led "a surge in the activity of religious groups and interests among broad segments of the population". The revival of the Church occurred in these formerly Communist areas; Christian missionaries also entered the former Eastern Bloc in order to engage in evangelism there, winning people back to Christianity.

Christian democracy is a centrist political ideology inspired by Catholic social teaching and Neo-Calvinist theology. Christian democratic political parties came to prominence after World War II after Roman Catholics and Protestants worked together to help rebuild war-torn Europe. From its inception, Christian Democracy fosters an "ecumenical unity achieved on the religious level against the atheism of the government in the Communist countries".

== Ecumenical symbols ==
=== Ecumenical symbol ===
The ecumenical symbol pre-dates the World Council of Churches (WCC), formed in 1948, but is incorporated into the official logo of the WCC and many other ecumenical organizations.

The church is portrayed as a boat afloat on the sea of the world with the mast in the form of a cross. These early Christian symbols of the church embody faith and unity and carry the message of the ecumenical movement.... The symbol of the boat has its origins in the gospel story of the calling of the disciples by Jesus and the stilling of the storm on Lake Galilee.

=== Christian flag ===
The Christian Flag

Although originating in the Wesleyan tradition, and most popular among mainline and evangelical Protestant churches, the "Christian Flag" stands for no creed or denomination, but for Christianity. With regard to the Christian symbolism of the flag:

The ground is white, representing peace, purity and innocence. In the upper corner is a blue square, the color of the unclouded sky, emblematic of heaven, the home of the Christian; also a symbol of faith and trust. in the center of the blue is the cross, the ensign and chosen symbol of Christianity: the cross is red, typical of Christ's blood.

An ecumenical Christian organization, the Federal Council of Churches (now succeeded by the National Council of Churches and Christian Churches Together), adopted the flag on 23 January 1942.

== See also ==
- Gamaliel's principle
- Inclusivism
- Invisible church
- Irenicism
- One true church
- One true faith
- Postdenominationalism
- Religious pluralism
- Rimé movement
- Sectarianism

== Bibliography ==
- Amess, Robert. One in the Truth?: the Cancer of Division in the Evangelical Church. Eastbourne, Eng.: Kingsway Publications, 1988. ISBN 0-86065-439-7.
- Avis, Paul. Reshaping Ecumenical Theology: The Church made Whole? Edinburgh: T & T Clark, 2010.
- Balmer, Randall Herbert (2004). Encyclopedia of Evangelicalism. Waco: Baylor University Press. ISBN 978-1-932792-04-1.
- Bartholomew I. Patriarchal and Synodal Encyclical on Orthodoxy Sunday 2010. Prot. No. 213. Istanbul: Ecumenical Patriarchate, 2010.
- van Beek, Huibert, ed. A Handbook of Churches and Councils: Profiles of Ecumenical Relationships. Geneva: World Council of Churches, 2006
- Borkowski, James D. "Middle East Ecumenism from an Anglican Perspective" Cloverdale Books (2007) ISBN 978-1-929569-23-6. Cloverdale Books - Middle East Ecumenism from an Anglican Perspective
- Bray, Gerald L. Sacraments & Ministry in Ecumenical Perspective, in series, Latimer Studies, 18. Oxford, Eng.: Latimer House, 1984. ISBN 0-946307-17-2.
- Briggs, John; Mercy Amba Oduyoye and Georges Tsetsis, eds. A History of the Ecumenical Movement, volume 3, 1968–2000 (Geneva: World Council of Churches, 2004).
- Cunningham, Lawrence, ed. Ecumenism: Present Realities and Future Prospects. Papers Read at the Tantur Ecumenical Center, Jerusalem 1997. Notre Dame, IN: University of Notre Dame Press, 1999.
- Episcopal Church (U.S.A.). Ecumenical Relations Office. About the Concordat: 28 Questions about the Agreement between the Episcopal Church and the Evangelical Church of America [i.e. the Evangelical Lutheran Church in America]. Cincinnati, Ohio: Forward Movement Publications, [1997?]. 43 p. Without ISBN
- Fey, Harold E. The Ecumenical Advance: A History of the Ecumenical Movement, volume 2, 1948–1968 (London: S.P.C.K., 1970).
- Florovsky, Georges Vasilievich, et al. La Sainte église universelle: confrontation oécuménique, in series, Cahiers théologiques de l'Actualité protestante, hors série, 4. Neuchâtel, Switzerland: Delachaux et Niestlé, 1948.
- Goosen, Gideon. Bringing Churches Together: A Popular Introduction to Ecumenism, 2nd ed. Geneva: WCC Publications, 2001.
- Harrison, Simon. Conceptions of Unity in Recent Ecumenical Discussion: A Philosophical Analysis. Oxford, Peter Lang, 2000
- Hawkey, Jill. Mapping the Oikoumene: A Study of Current Ecumenical Structures and Relationships. Geneva: WCC Publications, 2004
- Headlam, Arthur Cayley, Bp. Christian Unity. London: Student Christian Movement Press, 1930. 157 p. N.B.: This study's orientation is Anglican (Church of England).
- Hedegard, David. Ecumenism and the Bible. Amsterdam: International Council of Christian Churches, 1954.
- Hein, David. "The Episcopal Church and the Ecumenical Movement, 1937–1997: Presbyterians, Lutherans, and the Future." Anglican and Episcopal History 66 (1997): 4–29.
- Hein, David. "Radical Ecumenism." Sewanee Theological Review 51 (June 2008): 314–328. Proposes that mainline Protestants, such as Episcopalians, have much to learn from heirs of the Radical Reformation, including the Amish.
- John Paul II, Encyclical Letter Ut Unum Sint ("That they may be one"), 25 May 1995.
- Kasper, Walter, That They May All Be One: The Call to Unity Today (London: Burns & Oates, 2004).
- Kasper, Walter, Harvesting the Fruits: Aspects of Christian Faith in Ecumenical Dialogue (New York: Continuum, 2009).
- Kinnamon, Michael. Can a Renewal Movement be Renewed? Questions for the Future of Ecumenism. Grand Rapids: William B. Eerdmans, 2014.
- Kinnamon, Michael. The Vision Of The Ecumenical Movement And How It Has Been Impoverished By Its Friends. St Louis: Chalice Press, 2003
- Lossky, Nicholas, et al., Dictionary of the Ecumenical Movement. Grand Rapids: William B. Eerdmans, 2002
- Mackay, John A., Ecumenics: The Science of the Church Universal (Englewood Cliffs, N.J.: Prentice-Hall, Inc.: 1964).
- Mascall, Eric Lionel. The Recovery of Unity: a Theological Approach. London: Longmans, Green, and Co., 1958.
- Mastrantonis, George. "Augsburg and Constantinople : The Correspondence between the Tübingen Theologians and Patriarch Jeremiah II of Constantinople on the Augsburg Confession." Holy Cross Orthodox Press (1982), reprinted (2005). ISBN 0-916586-82-0
- Meyer, Harding. That All May Be One: Perceptions and Models of Ecumenicity. Grand Rapids: William B. Eerdmans, 1999.
- McSorley, Harry J., C. S. P., Luther: Right or Wrong? An Ecumenical-Theological Study of Luther's Major Work, The Bondage of the Will, Minneapolis, Minnesota, Augsburg Publishing House, 1968.
- Metzger, John Mackay, The Hand and the Road: The Life and Times of John A. Mackay (Louisville, Kentucky: Westminster John Knox Press, 2010).
- Noll, Mark A. (2004). The Rise of Evangelicalism: The Age of Edwards, Whitefield and the Wesleys. Inter-Varsity. ISBN 978-1-84474-001-7.
- O'Gara, Margaret. No Turning Back: The Future of Ecumenism. Glazier Press, 2014.
- Riggs, Ann; Eamon McManus, Jeffrey Gros, Introduction to Ecumenism. New York: Paulist Press, 1998.
- Rouse, Ruth and Stephen Charles NeillA History of the Ecumenical Movement 1517–1948 (Philadelphia: Westminster Press, 1954).
- Sagovsky, Nicholas, Ecumenism, Christian Origins and the Practice of Communion, Cambridge University Press: Cambridge, UK (2000)
- Second Vatican Council, Unitatis Redintegratio: Decree on Ecumenism, 21 November 1964.
- Visser 't Hooft, Willem Adolf, "Appendix I: The Word 'Ecumenical' – Its History and Use," in A History of the Ecumenical Movement 1517–1948, edited by Ruth Rouse and Stephen Charles Neill (Philadelphia: Westminster Press, 1954), 735–740.
- Waddams, Herbert. The Church and Man's Struggle for Unity, in series and subseries, Blandford History Series: Problems of History. London: Blandford Press, 1968. xii, 268 p., b&w ill.
- Weigel, Gustave, S.J., A Catholic Primer on the Ecumenical Movement (Westminster, Maryland: Newman Press, 1957).
