= Benjamin Dorme Lartey =

Liberian administrator

The Dr. Benjamin Dorme Lartey is a Liberian administrator. He was general secretary of the Liberian Council of Churches and Executive Committee Member of the Fellowship of Christian Councils and Churches in West Africa. He is member of the African Methodist Episcopal Zion Church of Liberia.

== See also ==
- Sumowood Harris
