= Pentecostals & Charismatics for Peace & Justice =

Ecumenical Pentecostal Society for Nonviolence

Pentecostals & Charismatics for Peace & Justice (PCPJ), known as the Pentecostal Charismatic Peace Fellowship until 2007, is a multicultural, gender inclusive and ecumenical organization that promotes peace, justice and reconciliation work among Pentecostal and Charismatic Christians. Members and adherents in over twenty denominations, fifteen countries, and forty universities and seminaries participate.

A Pentecostal peace fellowship was first suggested in a paper presented in July 2001 at the European Pentecostal Charismatic Research Association conference at the Catholic University of Leuven in Leuven, Belgium by Paul Alexander, now Professor of Social Ethics at Palmer Theological Seminary of Eastern University (St Davids, Pennsylvania). By March 2002, about thirty Pentecostals and Charismatics had signed on after another version of the original paper was presented at the Society for Pentecostal Studies conference in Lakeland, Florida.

Later that year, Marlon Millnerwrote "Send Judah First: An Open Letter to President George W. Bush", encouraging the USA not to invade Iraq. This letter, which was signed by many Pentecostal and Charismatic pastors, students, and teachers, helped launch PCPJ and brought together the leadership team. The "Send Judah First" letter and the list of signatories is included as chapter 9 of Pentecostals and Nonviolence: Reclaiming a Heritage.

PCPJ held its first conference, Intercession as a Way of Life: Peacemaking and Discipleship, near Dallas, Texas, in October 2005. The following October they met in Philadelphia, Pennsylvania, for Seeking the Peace of the City. In October 2007, they met at the Providence Christian Center (known as The Hot Dog Church) in San Francisco, California, for Reconciliation: Message, Ministry, and Movement. The 2008 annual conference was in Dallas.

PCPJ publishes a book series, Pentecostals, Peacemaking, and Social Justice, with Wipf & Stock Publishers.

== See also ==
- List of anti-war organizations
