= Mary David Walgenbach =

American nun (born 1939)

- Born: Madonna Marie Walgenbach; March 12, 1939 (age 86); Hospers, Iowa
- Education: University of Wisconsin–Madison
- Organization(s): Benedictine Women of Madison, founder and prioress

Mary David Walgenbach (born March 12, 1939) is an American nun. She serves as the prioress of Holy Wisdom Monastery in Middleton, Wisconsin.

== Biography ==
In 1961 Mary David Walgenbach took her vows to become a Catholic nun, joining the sisterhood at St. Benedict's Monastery in Middleton, Wisconsin. She studied nursing at St. Vincent Hospital in Sioux City, Iowa, and theology and spirituality at the University of Wisconsin–Madison. In 2006, Walgenbach renounced her Catholic vows and led the worshipping community at St. Benedict's to become ecumenical, renaming the monastery, Holy Wisdom Monastery. She is the prioress at Holy Wisdom Monastery and a founding member of the Benedictine Women of Madison, Inc.

== Early life ==
Mary David Walgenbach was born Madonna Marie Walgenbach on a farm near Hospers, Iowa, the daughter of Roland Walgenbach and Alida (née Hess) Walgenbach. She has three brothers and one sister, and attended the local public high school. A Benedictine nun from St. Vincent Hospital in Sioux City, Iowa visited her Catholic class, influencing her decision to become a Benedictine nun.

== Early monastic life ==
Following high school, Walgenbach studied nursing at St. Vincent's Hospital for one year before joining the Benedictine Sisters at St. Benedict's Monastery in Middleton, Wisconsin. She took her vows on January 6, 1961, coinciding with the Feast of Epiphany. She taught chemistry and horsemanship at the sisters’ all-girls school, The Academy of St. Benedict, until it was closed in 1966. Following the Second Vatican Council, Walgenbach stopped wearing the habit, and the sisters of St. Benedict's Monastery added inclusive language to their prayers, invited lay people to join in a weekly service, and opened a retreat center at the site of the closed school.

== Later monastic life ==
In 1980 during the worldwide celebrations of the 1,500 year birth anniversary of St. Benedict, Sr. Mary David Walgenbach and Sr. Joanne Kolasch began building an ecumenical community in the Madison area. In 1999 they began the process of breaking with the Catholic Church with the support of The Federation of St. Gertrude, of which St. Benedict's is one of 17 other members. With legal help from Fr. Dan Ward, the sisters transferred the deeds to the land to their own names. In 2006, Walgenbach was released from her Catholic vows. She became a founding member of the Benedictine Women of Madison, Inc. Walgenbach, alongside Sr. Joanne Kolasch and Sr. Lynne Smith renamed St. Benedict's Monastery to Holy Wisdom Monastery.

Walgenbach oversaw the conservation and preservation of the 130-acre (53 ha) property at Holy Wisdom Monastery. The farmland, which overlooks Lake Mendota, was restored to original prairie and oak savannah, and runoff sediment was removed from Lost Lake, a tiny glacial pond on the property. Resulting wetland detention areas have stopped silt and runoff from flowing into Lake Mendota. In 2002, Walgenbach received a $2,000 environmental award for restoring endangered ecosystems and improving the Lake Mendota Priority Watershed.

In 2009, Walgenbach oversaw the demolition of the Benedict House and construction of a new monastery building, which includes a chapel, dining rooms, library, and smaller worship spaces. Ninety-nine and three-quarters percent of the demolished building was recycled. The new building uses solar panels, geothermal pumps, energy-absorbing windows, roof gardens and rain storage tanks. Walgenbach received the Assisi Award for Faith Based Conservation in 2017. The new monastery is the highest-rated LEED building in the United States.

== Awards ==
- 1998 YMCA of Madison Woman of Distinction Award
- 2017 Assisi Award for Faith Based Conservation
