= Gertrude McDermott =

American Benedictine teacher (1846–1940)

Mother Gertrude McDermott (1846–1940) was a member of the Order of St. Benedict from 1879 until her death on September 22, 1940. McDermott began her life's work on an Indian reservation in the Dakota Territory where she was a teacher as well as a friend and adviser to Sitting Bull. She went on to be the founder of several educational and medical institutions in Sioux City, Iowa. McDermott also established a religious community which continues as the Benedictine Women of Madison in Wisconsin.

== Early life ==
Mary Ellen McDermott was born in 1864 in Gallitzin, Pennsylvania. She entered a Benedictine convent in Conception, Missouri at the age of 15 where she became Sister Gertrude.

== Career ==
In 1881, she traveled to the Dakota Territory where she worked as a principal of the Indian agency parochial school on Standing Rock Indian Reservation. It was there, in 1883, she met Sitting Bull who knocked on her door during a snow storm looking for shelter. This meeting began a long friendship which resulted in Mother Gertrude traveling to Sitting Bull's headquarters where she encouraged him to surrender before the coming conflict with the U.S. military. Mother Gertrude is said to have been the last white person to see Sitting Bull before he was killed in battle in 1890. One year later, she left the reservation and traveled to Elkton, South Dakota where, with two other sisters, she founded St. Gertrude's Academy. She served as the superior for St. Gertrude's which functioned as a convent, a school, an orphanage and a hospital until it burned down in 1894.

In 1897, she moved to Sioux City, Iowa with six other sisters, where she established the Sisters of St. Benedict of Sioux City and served as their prioress. In this capacity she supervised the opening of Villa Maria, a home for working girls in 1901, St. Vincent Hospital in 1907, St. Vincent School of Nursing in 1910, St. Monica's home for orphans and unwed mothers in 1914, and the Benedictine Hospital in Sterling, Colorado in 1925. St. Vincent Hospital merged with St. Joseph Hospital in 1977 to form a health care center currently named Mercy Medical Center.

In 1952, the Sisters of the Order of St. Benedict in Sioux City, at the request of Bishop William P. O'Connor of the Madison Wisconsin Diocese, started a high school which eventually became the Academy of St. Benedict. The community eventually moved its monastery to Madison. They are currently known as the Benedictine Women of Madison. Here the community, founded by Mother Gertrude McDermott, continues its legacy of service and innovation as the first ecumenical Benedictine community of sisters in the United States.
