= Ecumenism, Christian Origins and the Practice of Communion =

2000 book by Nicholas Sagovsky

- Author: Nicholas Sagovsky
- Language: English
- Genre: Nonfiction
- Publisher: Cambridge University Press
- Publication date: 2000
- Publication place: United Kingdom
- Pages: 221
- ISBN: 9780521772693
- OCLC: 42296688
- LC Class: BX6.5.S25 2000

Ecumenism, Christian Origins and the Practice of Communion is a 2000 book about Christian ecumenism by the Anglican theologian Nicholas Sagovsky. It was published by Cambridge University Press.

== Reviews ==
- Clements, Keith (October 2001). "Reviews". The Journal of Theological Studies. 52 (2): 983–985. doi:10.1093/jts/52.2.983. ISSN 0022-5185. JSTOR 23970121.
- Gallaher, Anastassy (2001). "Book Reviews". St Vladimir's Theological Quarterly. 45 (1): 101–106. ISSN 0036-3227.
- Kenneson, Philip D. (5 November 2000). "Reviews". Reviews in Religion & Theology. 7 (5): 518–520. doi:10.1111/1467-9418.00073. ISSN 1350-7303.
- Sherlock, Charles (August 2003). "Book Reviews". Journal of Anglican Studies. 1 (1): 124–127. doi:10.1177/174035530300100111. ISSN 1740-3553.
- Tanner, Mary (January 2001). "Book Reviews". Theology. 104 (817): 70–71. doi:10.1177/0040571X0110400140. ISSN 0040-571X. S2CID 170215670.
- Wainwright, Geoffrey (October 2002). "Book Review". Theology Today. 59 (3): 496–498. doi:10.1177/004057360205900330. ISSN 0040-5736. S2CID 170948431. ProQuest 208064050.
