= Jeff Erlanger =

American disability advocate (1970–2007)

- Born: Jeffrey Clay Erlanger; November 30, 1970; Madison, Wisconsin, U.S.
- Died: June 10, 2007 (aged 36); Madison, Wisconsin, U.S.
- Education: Edgewood College (BS)
- Occupation: Advocate
- Years active: 1988–2007

Jeffrey Clay Erlanger (November 30, 1970 – June 10, 2007) was an American advocate and activist for disability rights. He is known for appearing on Mister Rogers' Neighborhood when he was 10 years old, talking about his electric wheelchair and why he needed it.

Erlanger's philosophy was summarized in a 2002 Wisconsin Public Television ad: "It doesn't matter what I can't do—what matters is what I can do."

== Early life and education ==
Jeffrey Clay Erlanger was born in Madison, Wisconsin, on November 30, 1970, to Howard and Pam Erlanger, joining his older sister, Lisa. His father is a professor at the University of Wisconsin–Madison School of Law. When Erlanger was 7 months old, he was diagnosed with a spinal tumor. Surgery was used to remove it, but he was left as a quadriplegic. He received his first electric wheelchair when he was 4 years old. He required many additional surgeries while growing up.

Erlanger graduated from Memorial High School and from Edgewood College with a degree in political science.

=== Mister Rogers' Neighborhood ===
Before Erlanger underwent spinal surgery at age 5, his parents asked him what he wanted. He said he wanted to meet "Mister Rogers." His sister wrote Fred Rogers about her brother's wishes. Rogers happened to be traveling to Milwaukee, Wisconsin, so the Erlangers drove to meet him for breakfast in a restaurant. Several years later, Erlanger was invited to be on Rogers' show.

Erlanger appeared in Season 11, Episode 4 (#1478), which aired on February 18, 1981. The ten-year-old showed Rogers how his electric wheelchair worked and explained why he needed it. They talked about his parents, doctors, recent surgery and what you can do when you're sad. Together they sang one of Rogers' popular songs, "It's You I Like." The two of them continued to communicate. In speeches Rogers gave, he told of Erlanger's example of "overcoming obstacles and feeling comfortable about yourself."

== Career ==
=== Political career and activism ===
Erlanger worked as an intern for Representative Tammy Baldwin and Senator Russ Feingold, who honored Erlanger in the Senate. Erlanger became very active in Madison, Wisconsin municipal politics, holding a number of positions in the community including as a member of the Economic Development Commission, chair of the Commission on People with Disabilities, and chair of the Board of Directors of the Community Living Alliance. In 2003, he ran for the Madison Common Council for the 8th District, losing to UW student Austin King almost 2-to-1 in the heavily student district. He helped gain the accessible taxicab service in Madison today.

In 2004 Erlanger flew to Boston to attend the Democratic National Convention, although he did not have a ticket. Dane County Executive Kathleen Falk, whose campaign Erlanger had worked on, was on his flight and got him in. Falk said after his death, "Jeff was passionate about our nation on a big-scale level and equally passionate about our community," adding, "This is a man who devoted so many countless hours to making things better for other people."

In February 2000, Erlanger made a random connection in an America Online chat room at the end of the day with a woman in Boston who said she was trying to kill herself. She said she had "cut herself and blood was going down her arms." Unsure if it was a hoax, Erlanger decided to take action, but his phone was in use with the computer modem. He went to his building's lobby to call the police in Madison and Boston, and then AOL to help with the rescue. Boston police found the woman, who had fresh cuts on her wrist, and took her to a hospital for medical treatment.

When Rogers was inducted into the Television Hall of Fame in 1999, Erlanger was a surprise guest to introduce him. Rogers sprang from his seat and went onto the stage when Erlanger appeared.

In May 2003, Erlanger attended the memorial service for Rogers at Heinz Hall in Pittsburgh to honor him.

Erlanger's appearance on Rogers' show is featured in the 2018 PBS special Mister Rogers: It's You I Like. The special's host and former crew member, Michael Keaton, recalled Rogers saying his most treasured moment on the show was with Erlanger. Erlanger's parents were interviewed in the 2018 documentary film Won't You Be My Neighbor?.

== Death and legacy ==
Jeff Erlanger died on June 10, 2007, at the age of 36 in Madison, Wisconsin. His death followed complications after he choked on food, which led to a coma lasting several weeks. He donated his organs. Debbie Friedman sang at his memorial service.

After his death, the City of Madison Common Council created the annual Jeffrey Clay Erlanger Civility In Public Discourse Award in his honor. Recipients include Dick Wagner, a longtime elected and appointed official, Torrie Kopp Mueller for efforts to eliminate racism, empower women, and decriminalize homelessness; William Greer, president and CEO of Journey Mental Health Center; Leslie Ann Howard, United Way's president and CEO; and Nan Brian, whose career has served children. The Jeff Erlanger Accessible Playground at Rennebohm Park in Madison was named in honor of Erlanger in September, 2023. The wheelchair-using character Jeff Mouse, on the PBS Kids TV series Donkey Hodie (which is a spin-off of Mister Rogers' Neighborhood) was inspired by Erlanger.

On August 24, 2026, Madison Metropolitan School District announced Charles Lindbergh Elementary School would be renamed Jeffrey Clay Erlanger Elementary School.
