= Benedictine Women of Madison =

Benedictine monastery in Middleton, Wisconsin

Holy Wisdom Monastery
- Location within Wisconsin
- Interactive map of Holy Wisdom Monastery

Site
- Country: United States
- Coordinates: 43°07′15.8″N 89°27′07.9″W
- Website: benedictinewomen.org

Benedictine Women of Madison is an ecumenical community of religious women who follow the Benedictine monastic tradition. They are located in Middleton, Wisconsin, near Madison, where they manage Holy Wisdom Monastery.

Members of the Benedictine Women of Madison participate in communal prayer five times daily. They hold retreats and manage the business affairs of the monastery.

== History ==
The community grew out of an earlier community of Roman Catholic religious women. In 1954, a group of sisters moved their community from Sioux City, Iowa, to Madison, Wisconsin at the invitation of the Bishop of Madison. The sisters founded and built a Roman Catholic high school for girls in 1958, which they ran until 1966. At that time, the sisters closed the school and reopened their building as an ecumenical prayer center, called St. Benedict Center, to serve the wider Christian community of Madison.

In the late 1990s, the community formally withdrew from the jurisdiction of Roman Catholic canon law. They transferred their governance to the Federation of St. Gertrude, a group of 17 independent Benedictine women's communities. The process of transferring governance took over ten years and allowed the Madison women to begin accepting women of any Christian tradition as a member of their community. An ordained Presbyterian minister became the first Protestant member of the community in 2004. She joined two Roman Catholic women. On Sunday mornings, an ecumenical Christian service is held at Holy Wisdom Monastery, which is led by a rotation of ordained Christian ministers, though never a Roman Catholic.

== Relations with other communions ==
Other groups involved in Holy Wisdom Monastery include the Oblates and the Community of Benedict, two different groups of single and married people from many religious traditions who follow the Rule of St. Benedict in their daily lives; and Sunday Assembly, which gathers on Sunday mornings for an ecumenical Christian worship service.

As an ecumenical retreat and conference center, Holy Wisdom Monastery has hosted groups such as the Lutheran Churches' Summer Institute for Mission, monks from the Taizé Community in France, and a visit from the Dalai Lama.

In a June 2006 letter to priests in the Diocese of Madison, Bishop Robert Morlino wrote: "While this community [the Benedictine Women of Madison] fulfills our call for stronger efforts in ecumenical dialogue, I must stress that this is an experimental community and will not necessarily be Roman Catholic in belief or practice." The move toward ecumenism by the Benedictine Women of Madison was affirmed in 2007 by the worldwide leader of Benedictines, Abbot Primate Notker Wolf, the abbot of San Anselmo Monastery in Rome and official representative of the Benedictine order at the Vatican.

== Monastery and grounds ==
Holy Wisdom Monastery's grounds cover 138 acres (0.56 km^{2}), containing an oak savanna, tall grass prairies, and an ancient glacial kettle lake. Buildings on the grounds include a retreat and guest house, a hermitage, and the main monastery building, which is a LEED Platinum-certified building. This main monastery building houses a large gathering space for Sunday morning church services, an oratory for daily prayer, a kitchen, small and large dining rooms, a library, and office spaces.

The sisters began the environmental restoration of sections of the monastery property in the 1990s. Much of the land had been used for farming. An ancient glacial kettle lake on the property was dredged and 5000 truckloads of silt removed. Fields were also restored to native tall grass prairie, using seeds collected from similar prairies in the area.

In the early 2000s, the former high school and retreat center building was demolished and construction on a new monastery building began. Some 99.75% of the materials from the former building were either reused in the new building or recycled. The new monastery building has been LEED-certified at the Platinum level by the U.S. Green Building Council.

== See also ==
- Gertrude McDermott
- Mary David Walgenbach
