= Solomon Lartey =

Ghanaian businessman

- Born: Solomon Lartey
- Education: University of Ghana (BA.); University of Bradford (MBA)
- Occupation: Businessman

Solomon Lartey is a Ghanaian businessman who was chief executive officer of Activa Insurance from 2017 to 2020.

== Early life and education ==
Solomon Lartey was educated at Accra Academy for his secondary education. He obtained a bachelor's degree from the University of Ghana. Lartey continued for a Masters in Business Administration at the University of Bradford.

== Career ==
Lartey started his career at Enterprise Insurance in Ghana.

He worked in the London Market as a Claims Manager at Planet Accident Claims. He was an insurance broker at Brooklands Financial Services Limited. He worked as a Mortgage and Insurance Consultant at the Simple Group in Mitcham, Surrey, United Kingdom and later held the same position at Bryant and Menson UK Limited (an appointed representative for Mortgage Broking Services Limited in Manchester).

In 2008, he returned to Ghana and joined Global Alliance Insurance as Operations Manager.

In 2009, he was appointed Chief Operating Officer after the acquisition of Global Alliance by Activa International Insurance. In 2014, Lartey was appointed deputy managing director of Activa. In 2017, Lartey became a member of the executive committee of Group Activa and the CEO of its insurance agency, Activa International Insurance.

== Recognition ==
- 2019 Best Insurance Executive at the Ghana Insurance Awards
- 2018 Best Insurance Executive at the Entrepreneur Foundation of Ghana Corporate Awards
