= Joint Working Group between the Roman Catholic Church and the World Council of Churches =

The Joint Working Group between the Roman Catholic Church and the World Council of Churches (JWG) is an ecumenical organization working to improve ties between the Catholic Church and its separate brethren, mainly consisting of Eastern Orthodox and Protestant Christians.

== History ==
=== Catholic Conference on Ecumenical Questions ===
In 1951, ecumenical pioneer Johannes Willebrands helped organize the Catholic Conference on Ecumenical Questions, which was in contact with the World Council of Churches.

=== 1965 meeting in Bossey ===
The first Joint Working Group meeting occurred in 1965 at the ecumenical institute of Bossey in Switzerland. This meeting came a few months after the promulgation of the conciliar document Unitatis Redintegratio.

=== Debate on proselytism ===
The Joint Working Group has collaborated in dialogue on the topic of proselytism, which was deemed harmful to Christian unity.

=== Ups and downs in collaboration ===
According to Armenian Catholicos Aram I, there have been ups and down in WCC–Catholic Church collaboration. In particular, he cites ecumenical tensions surrounding the ecclesial documents Dominus Iesus and Ecclesia de Eucharistia, as well as the question of the Eastern Catholic Churches.

=== Current goals ===
Areas of concern for the Joint Working Group have been the communication of the results of its studies, deliberations, and declarations to the parent bodies, the reception of its reports, and the implementation of its recommendations.
