= Fellowship of Christian Councils and Churches in West Africa =

West African Christian Organization

The Fellowship of Christian Councils and Churches in West Africa (FECCIWA) is a Christian ecumenical organization founded in 1994.

It is a member of the World Council of Churches. It includes member churches in Ghana, Guinea, Nigeria, Togo, Sierra Leone, Benin, Ivory Coast, Gambia, Liberia, Mali, Burkina Faso, Senegal, and Niger.

FECCIWA issues statements on political and military matters as well as scientific and ecological issues.
