= Liberian Council of Churches =

Ecumenical Christian organization in Liberia

The Liberian Council of Churches is an ecumenical Christian organization in Liberia. It was founded in 1982 and is a member of the World Council of Churches. Rev. Christopher Wleh Toe, I. is the present General Secretary of the Liberia Council of Churches. A Peacebuilder and advocate for justice. . Presiding Elder in the AME Zion Church in Liberia.
