= Catholic Church and ecumenism =

Dialogue between the Catholic Church and other Christian denominations

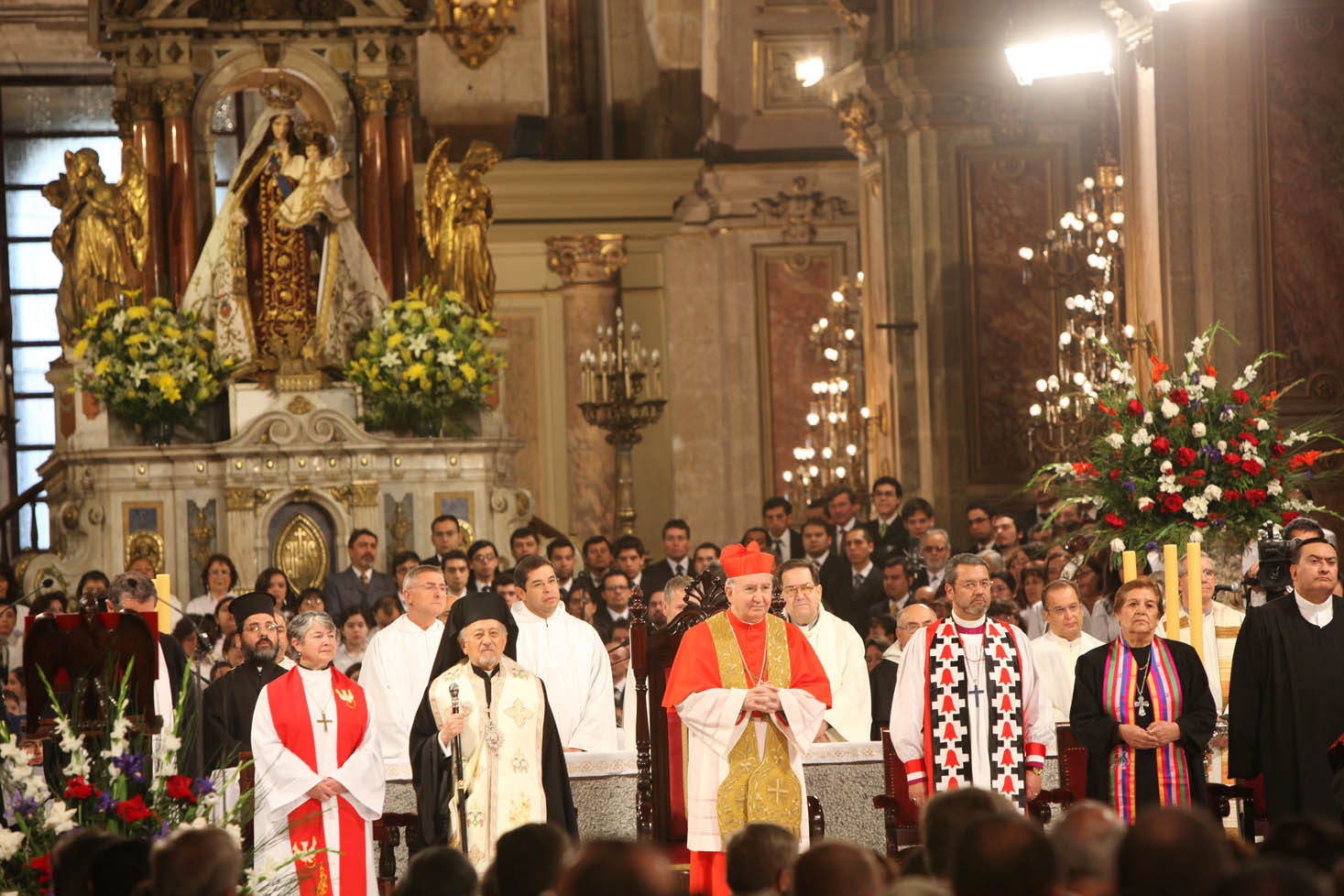
Te Deum Ecuménico 2009 in the Metropolitan Cathedral of Santiago of Chile, featuring clergy of different Christian denominations

The Catholic Church has engaged in the modern ecumenical movement especially since the Second Vatican Council (1962–1965) and the issuing of the decree Unitatis redintegratio and the declaration Dignitatis humanae. It was at the Council that the Pontifical Council for Promoting Christian Unity was created. Those outside of the Catholic Church were categorised as heretics (in reference to Protestantism, Church of the East and Oriental Orthodox Churches) or schismatics (as in the case of the Eastern Orthodox Church), but in many contexts today, to avoid offence, the euphemism "separated brethren" is used.

Since the mid-20th century, the Catholic Church in Unitatis redintegratio has emphasized the common Trintarian baptism of Catholic, Protestant, and Orthodox Christians. The Directory for the Application of Principles and Norms on Ecumenism states that "In liturgical celebrations taking place in other churches and ecclesial communities, Catholics are encouraged to take part in the psalms, responses, hymns, and common actions of the church in which they are guests."

== Definition ==
Ecumenism, from the Greek word "oikoumene", meaning "the whole inhabited world" (cf. Acts 17.6; Mt 24.14; Heb 2.5), is the promotion of cooperation and unity among Christians. The Union of Christendom is a traditional Catholic view of ecumenism; the view is that every non-Catholic Christian ecclesial community is destined to return to the unity of the Catholic Church, from which it has broken. As the original Church founded by Jesus Christ according to Catholic doctrine, the Church sees itself as "the one true church". This means that according to such teaching, Christian unity is already a reality, present in the Catholic Church.

The Catholic Church's commitment to ecumenism was based on the conviction that a divided Christianity "openly contradicts the will of Christ, scandalizes the world, and damages the holy cause of preaching the Gospel to every creature".

"The search for Christian Unity was one of the principal concerns of the Second Vatican Council". This was attested to even from the moment the council was announced, by Pope John XXIII, during the vespers closing the Octave of Prayer for Christian Unity on 25 January 1959, at the Basilica of Saint Paul Outside the Walls.

"The Catholic Church is committed to working for the reunion of all Christians, but the exuberant spirit following Vatican II has been tempered. Sober minds realize that the road to full unity will be long and arduous. One of the principal ecclesiological tasks is to discern the relationship between the Churches." Underlying the Catholic Church's pursuit of ecumenism is its recognition that elements of sanctification and truth are found in other churches, that, in some sense, these are Christians and particular churches or ecclesial communities, and that common baptism itself impels those toward greater unity, since Baptism is a gift which "belongs" to the Catholic Church as one of the sacraments which Christ endowed it with.

It can be said that the "ecumenicity" of the Church is another way of expressing her "radical catholicity and/or universality".

The Directory for the Application of Principles and Norms on Ecumenism states that bishops of the Catholic Church, "individually for their own dioceses, and collegially for the whole Church, are, under the authority of the Holy See, responsible for ecumenical policy and practice".

== Historical perspectives ==
=== Before the Second Vatican Council ===
The Catholic Church sees itself as the one, holy, catholic and apostolic church, founded by Christ himself. Its teachings, both before and after the Second Vatican Council, equate the one Church of Christ with the Catholic Church.

Ecumenism takes as it starting point that Christ founded just one Church, not many churches; hence the Catholic Church has as its ultimate hope and objective that through prayer, study, and dialogue, the historically separated bodies may come again to be reunited with it.

Unity was always a principal aim of the Catholic Church. Before the Second Vatican Council, the Catholic Church defined ecumenism as dialogue with other Christian groups to persuade these to return to a unity that they themselves had broken.

At the Second Council of Lyon (1274) and the Council of Florence (1438–42), in which some bishops of the Eastern Orthodox Church participated, reunion formulas were worked out, but these failed to win acceptance by the Eastern churches.

The Catholic Church, even before the Second Vatican Council, always considered it a duty of the highest rank to seek full unity with estranged communions of fellow-Christians, and at the same time to reject what it saw as premature and false union that would mean being unfaithful to or glossing over the teaching of Sacred Scripture and Tradition. But the main stress was laid on caution, as exemplified in canon 1258 the 1917 Code of Canon Law:

1. It is illicit for the faithful to assist at or participate in any way in non-Catholic religious functions.
2. For a serious reason requiring, in case of doubt, the Bishop's approval, passive or merely material presence at non-Catholic funerals, weddings and similar occasions because of holding a civil office or as a courtesy can be tolerated, provided there is no danger of perversion or scandal.

=== Second Vatican Council ===
The aim of the Second Vatican Council, as its initiator Pope John XXIII stated, was to seek renewal from within the Church itself, which would serve for those separated from the See of Rome as a "gentle invitation to seek and find that unity for which Jesus Christ prayed so ardently to his heavenly Father". The Council opened up an era of earnest endeavour not only to explain to others the Church's teaching, but also to understand their outlook.

While the Catholic Church sees itself as "the one, holy, catholic and apostolic church" founded by Christ himself, it recognizes that:

Nevertheless, many elements of sanctification and truth are found outside its visible confines. Since these are gifts belonging to the Church of Christ, they are forces impelling towards Catholic unity.

The Council's decree Unitatis redintegratio (1964) was exclusively devoted to ecumenism, confirming that "the restoration of unity among all Christians is one of [its] principal concerns".

In its Decree on the Apostolate of the Laity (1965) the Council also stated that:

"The quasi-common heritage of the Gospel (Note: Commune veluti patrimonium evangelicum in the Latin text) and the common duty of Christian witness resulting from it recommend and frequently require the cooperation of Catholics with other Christians, on the part of individuals and communities within the Church, either in activities or in associations, in the national or international field."

=== Later developments ===
Since the Second Vatican Council, under Pope Paul VI, and the beginning of the papacy of John Paul II, the Catholic Church has reached out to other Christian bodies, seeking reconciliation to the greatest degree possible.

Significant agreements have been achieved on baptism, ministry, and the Eucharist with Anglican theologians. With Evangelical Lutheran bodies, a similar agreement was reached on the theology of justification. These landmark documents have brought closer fraternal ties with those churches.

However, recent developments, such as the ordination of women and of men living in homosexual relationships, present new obstacles to reconciliation with, in particular, Anglicans/Episcopalians. Consequently, in recent years the Catholic Church has focused its efforts on reconciliation with the Eastern Orthodox Church, with which the theological differences are not as great.

While relations with some Eastern Orthodox Churches were strained in the 1990s over property issues in post-Soviet states after the dissolution of the Soviet Union in 1989–1991, these differences are now largely resolved. Fraternal relations with the Eastern churches continue to progress.

The 1983 Code of Canon Law no longer has canons which absolutely forbid the social cooperation of Roman Catholic clergy (bishops, priests and deacons) with clergy members of other systems of belief. It still absolutely forbids Catholic priests to concelebrate the Eucharist with members of communities not in communion with the Catholic Church (canon 908). The Directory for the Application of Principles and Norms on Ecumenism states that "Christians may be encouraged to share in spiritual activities and resources, i.e., to share that spiritual heritage they have in common in a manner and to a degree appropriate to their present divided state."

== Relations with the World Council of Churches ==
One of the most significant documents on ecumenical relations was Baptism, Eucharist and Ministry, published by the Faith and Order Commission of the World Council of Churches (WCC) in 1982.

Although the Catholic Church is not a member of the WCC, since 1968 some Catholic theologians have been full members of the commission. Although not as representatives of their church, Catholic theologians participated in the production of the 1982 paper, with the aim to seek common ground between the various traditions concerning the Christian rite of initiation (Baptism), the sacrament of the Eucharist, and the nature of holy orders, while also stating clearly the differences existing between them. The churches were invited to indicate their reactions to the contents of the document, with a view to "analyz(ing) the ecumenical implications for the churches at a future World Conference on Faith and Order."

== Relations with churches of the East ==
The Catholic Church recognizes 21 Ecumenical or General Councils: Nicaea I (325), Constantinople I (381), Ephesus (431), Chalcedon (451), Constantinople II (553), Constantinople III (680–681), Nicaea II (787), Constantinople IV (869–870), Lateran I (1123), Lateran II (1139), Lateran III (1179), Lateran IV (1215), Lyons I (1245), Lyons II (1274), Vienne (1311–1312), Constance (1414–1418), Florence (1438–1445), Lateran V (1512–1517), Trent (1545–1563), Vatican I (1869–1870), Vatican II (1962–1965).

Of these, the Eastern Orthodox Church of Byzantine tradition accepts only the first seven, the family of "non-Chalcedonian" or "pre-Chalcedonian" churches only the first three, and the Assyrian Church of the East only the first two.

In spite of this, dialogue has shown that even where divisions have lasted longer than previous communion – as with the schisms rooted in the Christological controversies at the Council of Ephesus (431) and the Council of Chalcedon (451) – the few doctrinal differences often but not always concern terminology, not substance. In fact, as little as a decade of dialogue has done more to heal the divisions than fifteen centuries of apologetics, stereotypes, and suspicion.

=== Assyrian Church of the East ===
The Catholic Church recognizes in the Assyrian Church of the East as one of the valid successor bodies of the ancient Church of the Mesopotamian valley, where Christianity had been established by around the year 150, though tradition traces apostolic origins with the Apostle Thomas and his disciples-successors Addai and Mari.

The division between the Church of the Persian Empire and the churches of Rome and Constantinople goes back to the disputes over the legitimacy of the terms mother of God and mother of Christ for the Virgin Mary, that came to a head at the Council of Ephesus in 431. The Assyrian Church had adopted radical Antiochene Christology, as articulated by Nestorius and Theodore of Mopsuestia. They have been sometimes, erroneously, called Nestorian. This appellation is rejected by the Catholic Church.

Dialogue began with a meeting of the Assyrian Patriarch (Catholicos) Mar Dinkha IV and Pope John Paul II in 1984, and the patriarch's participation in the first Assisi Day of Prayer for Peace in 1986. Nearly a decade of dialogue proved sufficient to resolve the disagreements over terminology in Christology, leading to the Common Christological Declaration Between the Catholic Church and the Assyrian Church of the East, signed by Pope John Paul II of the Catholic Church and Mar Dinkha IV of the Assyrian Church of the East in 1994.

The Common Declaration recalls that the Assyrian Church of the East prays to the Virgin Mary as "the Mother of Christ our God and Saviour", and the Catholic tradition addresses the Virgin Mary as "the Mother of God" and also as "the Mother of Christ", fuller expressions by which each Church clearly acknowledges both the divinity and the humanity of Mary's son. The co-signers of the Common Declaration could thus state: "We both recognize the legitimacy and rightness of these expressions of the same faith and we both respect the preference of each Church in her liturgical life and piety."

Over the next six years, annual meetings of the dialogue came to a common understanding of sacraments, published in 2000 as the "Common Statement on Sacramental Life". It was hoped that this too would be raised to the level of a Joint or Common Declaration, while the dialogue moved on to practical ecclesiological, pastoral, and administrative questions for full communion.

However, in 2004, on the eve of a formal common declaration, the Assyrian patriarch and bishops decided to suspend the dialogue following disputes involving Bishop Bawai Soro, the leader of the Assyrian ecumenical movement, and his association with the Catholic Church.

The following year the Assyrian synod suspended Bawai Soro, who had led the dialogue with Rome. In 2008, Bawai Soro, along with six priests, thirty deacons, and about a thousand faithful, broke communion with the Assyrian Church and entered into full communion as part of the Chaldean Catholic Church. The personal tensions from these events further delayed the continuation of reunion talks.

In March 2015, Mar Dinkha IV died. In September 2015, a new Catholicos-Patriarch was elected, Gewargis III.

==== Dialogue documents ====
- 1994 Common Christological Declaration
- 1997 Joint Synodical Decree for Promoting Unity between the Assyrian Church of the East and the Chaldean Catholic Church
- 2001 Guidelines for Admission to the Eucharist Between the Chaldean Church and the Assyrian Church of the East

=== Oriental Orthodox Churches ===
Since 2003, the Catholic Church has engaged with the entire communion of Oriental Orthodox Churches as a whole, rather than with each autocephalous church in independent dialogues.

==== Dialogue documents ====
With individual Oriental Orthodox Churches:

- 1971 Common Declaration of Pope Paul VI and Mar Ignatus Jacob III of the Syriac Orthodox Church
- 1976 Common Christological Declaration of the Catholic Church and the Coptic Orthodox Church
- 1984 Common Declaration of Pope John Paul II and Mar Ignatius Zakka I Iwas of the Syriac Orthodox Church
- 1989 Joint Statement of the Catholic and Syriac Orthodox churches
- 1990 Doctrinal Agreement on Christology between the Catholic Church and the Syriac Orthodox Church
- 1993 Agreement and Pastoral Guidelines for Inter-Church Marriage between Catholics and Malankara Syriac Orthodox
- 1999 Joint Statement on the Synod of Diamper (AD 1599) by the Catholic and Malankara Orthodox Syrian churches

With the Oriental Orthodox Communion as a whole:

- 2009 Nature, Constitution, and Mission of the Church
- 2015 The Exercise of Communion in the Life of the Early Church and its Implications for our Search for Communion Today

=== Eastern Orthodox Church ===
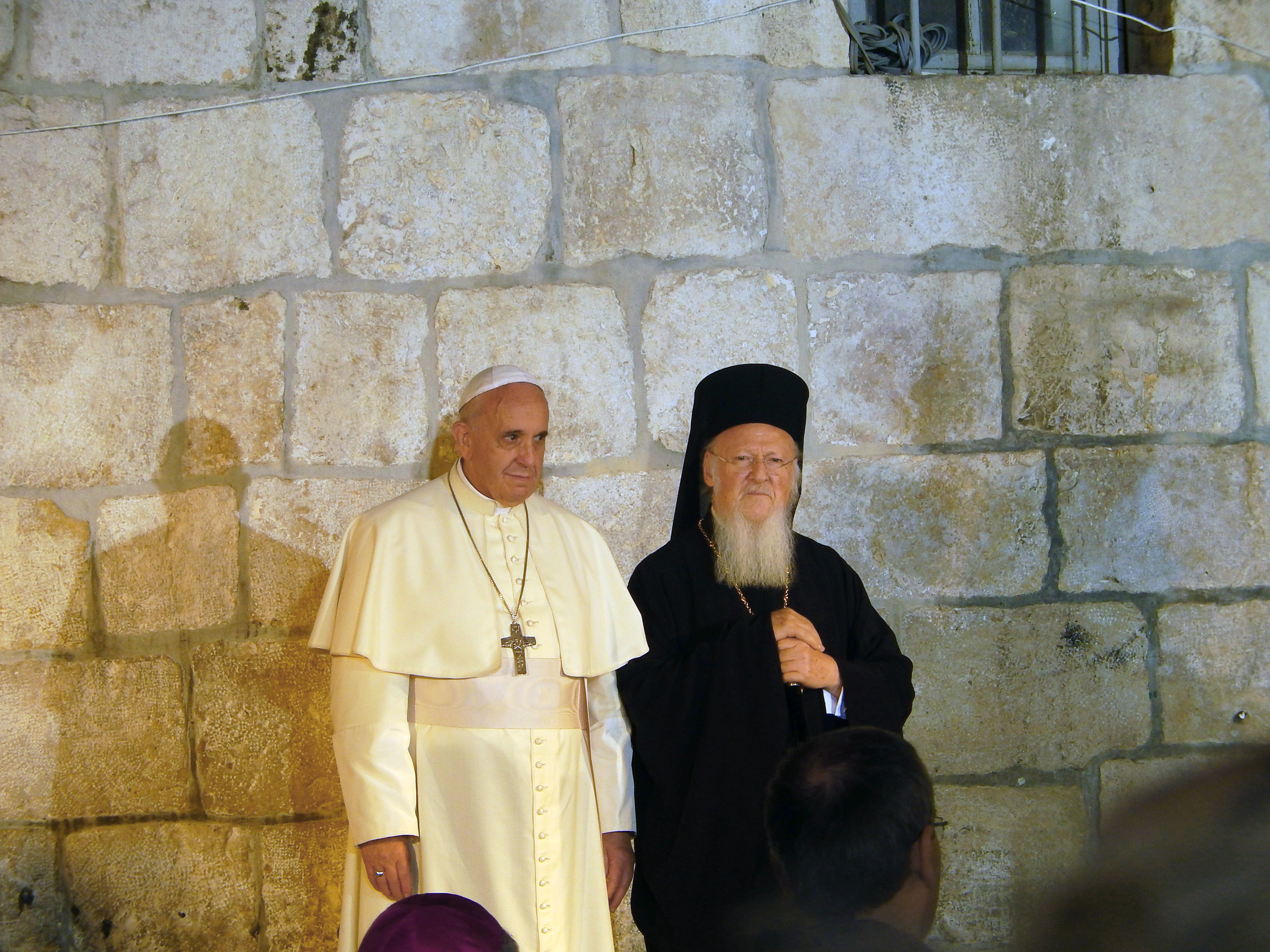
Pope Francis with Patriarch Bartholomew I of Constantinople

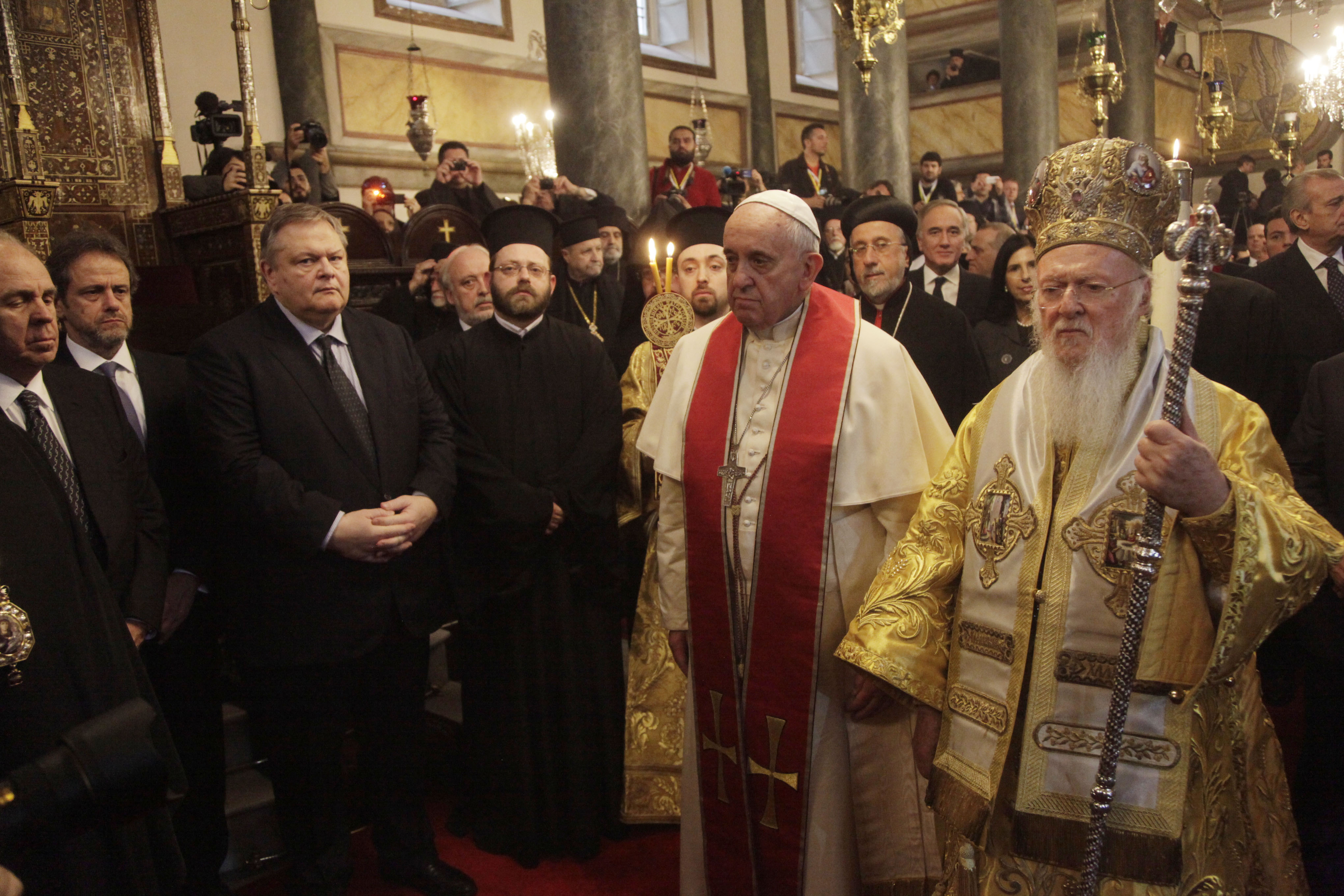
Pope Francis at Patronal Feast with Ecumenical Patriarch Bartholomew I of Constantinople

The 1993 Balamand declaration of the Joint International Commission for Theological Dialogue Between the Catholic Church and the Orthodox Church discusses ecclesiological principles and suggests practical rules for both the Catholic Church and the Eastern Orthodox Church to implement about improving relations by reciprocally avoiding interfering in each other's churches and not using history in a polemical manner. (Note: The report contains unofficial suggestions of the commission, "until the competent organs of the Catholic Church and of the Orthodox Churches express their judgement in regard to it.") According to Cardinal Edward Cassidy, the report contains three principles: that individuals have the freedom to follow their conscience, that Eastern Catholic Churches have the right to exist, that uniatism is not the current method of full communion; and two conclusions: that the Catholic Church and the Eastern Orthodox Church are "sister churches" and that rebaptism should be avoided. The principle that "the inviolable freedom of persons and their obligation to follow the requirements of their conscience", is foundational, according to Cassidy, "and justifies both the personal choice to adhere to the Catholic Church or to the Orthodox Church, and offers the possibility of returning to the Catholic Church for those communities which in 1945–49 had been forced to convert by Communist regimes to become part of the Orthodox Church," as happened in the Ukrainian Soviet Socialist Republic, the Socialist Republic of Romania and the Czechoslovak Socialist Republic. The Eastern Catholics rejected the report "because it seemed to imply they should never have existed in the first place" while the Eastern Orthodox rejected it because it did not call for the abolition of the Eastern Catholic Churches. (Note: The report showed how some Western "universal values of freedom of conscience could offend the Orthodox who are less concerned by the rights of the individual than the rights of the community and tradition." For example, the phrase "the right of each person to join the religion of his choice" was removed in the final version of paragraph 27 in the report.)

On 3 July 2019, it was revealed that during a Vatican meeting with Orthodox Archbishop Job of Telmessos, who represented the Orthodox Church's Ecumenical Patriarch Bartholomew of Constantinople, during the feast of Sts. Peter and Paul on 29 June 2019, Pope Francis stated that unity rather than leveling differences should be the goal between the Catholic and Orthodox churches. Pope Francis also gave Bartholomew nine bone fragments which were believed to have belonged to St. Peter and which were displayed at a public Mass which was held in the Vatican in November 2013 to celebrate the 'Year of Faith.'

=== Russian Orthodox Church ===
In February 2016, Pope Francis and Russian Orthodox Patriarch Kirill held a meeting in Cuba and afterwards issued a joint declaration

On 4 July 2019, however, it was confirmed that tensions still remained between the Vatican and the Russian Orthodox Church, with the Russo-Ukrainian war serving as a major cause of these tensions. Despite holding a "cordial" meeting with Russian President Vladimir Putin in the Vatican, Pope Francis stated it is unlikely that he will visit Russia unless Putin agrees to not include the Russian Orthodox Church in the invitation, which Putin stated would be unlikely as well. Pope Francis has also declared support for the Ukrainian Greek Catholic Church, which has expressed opposition to Putin and the Russian Orthodox Church. During the first day of a meeting with Ukrainian Greek Catholic Church leaders on 5 July 2019, Pope Francis also accused the Russian Orthodox Church of attempting to manipulate "other religions" in Ukraine as well.

== Relations with churches of the West ==
=== Lutheran churches ===
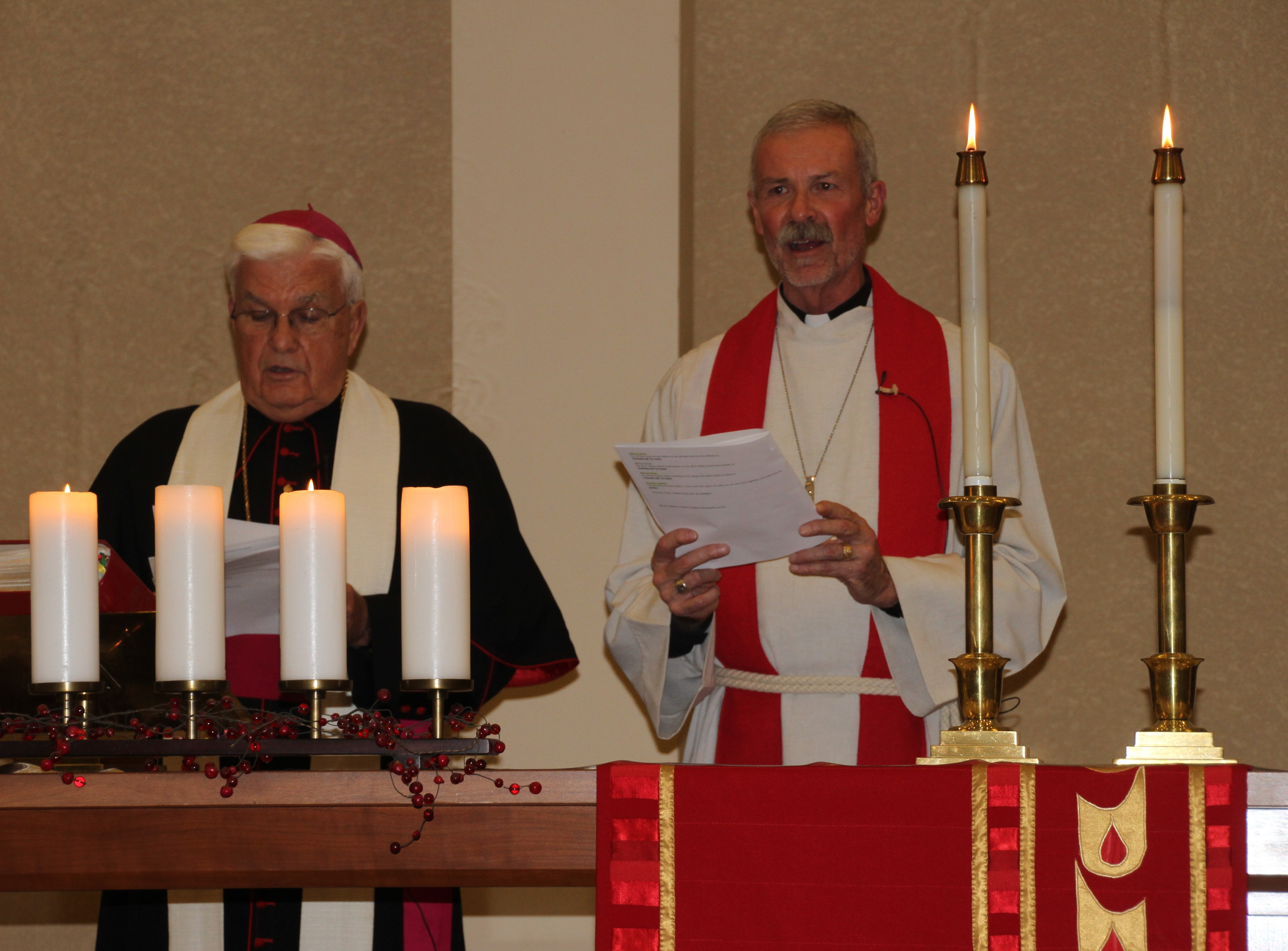
Bishop John M. Quinn (left) of the Roman Catholic Diocese of Winona and Bishop Steven Delzer of Evangelical Lutheran Southeastern Minnesota Synod leading a Reformation Day service in 2017

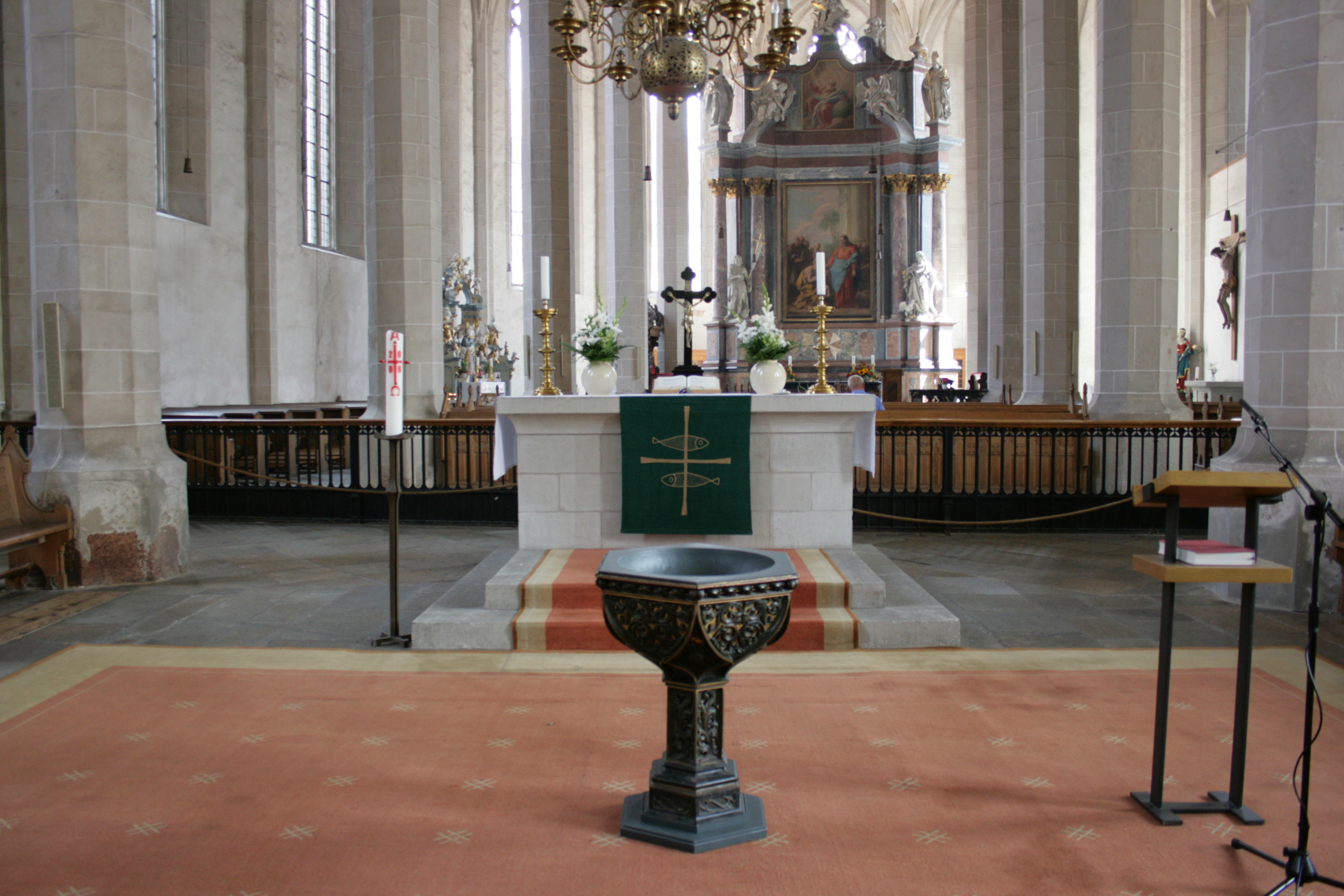
Since 1530, the Cathedral of St Peter in Bautzen has shared by the Catholic Church and the Evangelical-Lutheran Church of Saxony

At the time of the Reformation, of the emerging Christian traditions, Lutheranism was the most conservative in retaining the aesthetic, liturgical and devotional practices of the pre-Reformation Church. The closest Western denomination of Christianity to Catholicism is generally considered to be Lutheranism. Jesuit priest Rune P. Thuringer, writing in 1965, noted that "The eucharistic liturgy of the state Church of Sweden, which is Lutheran, is closer in many respects to the rite of the Roman Mass than that of any other Protestant church." The Lutheran Church did see itself as constituting the one true church and saw the Church of Rome as falling away from the faith. Lutheranism and Catholicism share common beliefs, including seeing baptism, eucharist, and confession as sacraments. Catholics and Lutherans teach baptismal regeneration, that humans "are cleansed of our sins and born again and renewed in Holy Baptism by the Holy Ghost". Lutherans and Catholics emphasize the importance of confession and absolution, exercised through the Office of the Keys, the power given by Christ to the Church for the binding of and loosing of sins. Additionally, both Lutherans and Catholics affirm a belief in the real presence of Christ in the Eucharist, though Lutherans teach that this occurs through a sacramental union and Catholics teach that this occurs through transubstantiation. The Lutheran churches of Scandinavia (such as the Church of Sweden) and those formed from Scandinavian missionary activity (such as the Evangelical Lutheran Church in Kenya) teach the doctrine of apostolic succession though "the Catholic Church has never officially expressed its judgement on the validity of orders as they have been handed down by episcopal succession".

The Catholic–Lutheran dialogue began over thirty years ago, and has consisted of eleven rounds of discussion. The most recent discussion has focused on doctrines associated with eternal life. The dialogue process has produced one major joint declaration, concerning the doctrine of justification, issued in 1999 called the Joint Declaration on the Doctrine of Justification.

On Reformation Day in 2016, Pope Francis of the Catholic Church travelled to Sweden (where the Lutheran Church is the national Church) to commemorate the 500th anniversary of the Reformation at Lund Cathedral, which serves as the cathedra for the Bishop of Lund of the Church of Sweden, a Lutheran church. An official press release from the Holy See stated:

The Lutheran World Federation (LWF) and Roman Catholic Church joint event will highlight the 50 years of continuous ecumenical dialogue between Catholics and Lutherans and the joint gifts of this collaboration. The Catholic-Lutheran commemoration of 500 years of the Reformation is structured around the themes of thanksgiving, repentance and commitment to common witness. The aim is to express the gifts of the Reformation and ask forgiveness for division perpetuated by Christians from the two traditions.

An ecumenical service was presided over by Bishop Munib Younan, the president of the Lutheran World Federation, Martin Junge, the General Secretary of the LWF, as well as Pope Francis, the leader of the Catholic Church.

Sr. Susan Wood, a Sister of Charity, who is a systematic theology professor and chair of the theology department at Marquette University and a former president of the Catholic Theological Society of America, stated that "Since Vatican II, we have acknowledged an imperfect communion between Lutheran and Catholics", holding that "there is no substantial difference in Lutheran and Catholic belief in the real presence of Christ in the Eucharist". Wood stated that in the near future she thought that intercommunion could happen in places "where people can't get out, like nursing homes and prisons."

On 15 November 2015, while at Christuskirche in Rome Pope Francis answered a Lutheran woman wishing to be able to participate in Holy Communion with her Catholic husband: "It is a question that each person must answer for themselves … there is one baptism, one faith, one Lord, so talk to the Lord and move forward". In the following year at Lund Cathedral, in a joint Lutheran-Catholic service commemorating the Reformation, Pope Francis and Bishop Munib Younan (the head of the Lutheran World Federation) "jointly pledged to remove the obstacles to full unity between their churches, leading eventually to shared Eucharist."

Recognizing that "that everyone in a marriage that binds denominations," the Catholic Church in Germany in 2018 produced a pastoral handout allowing Lutheran spouses of Catholics to receive Communion from Catholic ministers in certain cases, 'provided they "affirm the Catholic faith in the Eucharist".' Thus far, Archbishop Hans-Josef Becker (Roman Catholic Archdiocese of Paderborn), Archbishop Stefan Heße (Roman Catholic Archdiocese of Hamburg), Archbishop Ludwig Schick (Roman Catholic Diocese of Fulda), and Bishop Franz Jung (Roman Catholic Diocese of Würzburg) have implemented the pastoral document, in addition to Bishops Gerhard Feige of Magdeburg and Franz-Josef Bode of Osnabrück declaring their intention to implement the pastoral document well. Bishop Franz Jung, while celebrating a Jubilee Mass on 5 July 2018 at Würzburg Cathedral, called inter-denominational marriages "denomination-uniting" and thus "especially invited" couples in which one spouse is Protestant to receive the Eucharist during his sermon.

Archbishop Flavio Pace, Secretary of the Dicastery for Promoting Christian Unity proclaimed in January 2026 that a commemoration of the Augsburg Confession will be scheduled for 2030; he emphasized that "It is important to commemorate that text in order to rediscover a common basis" between the Catholic Church and the Lutheran churches.

On 26 August 2026, Pope Leo XIV met with Evangelical-Lutheran bishops from the Church of Norway, and declared a "common Baptism and our shared mission in the world" and prayed that "in God’s infinite goodness and wisdom, He may help us to live ever more truly as brothers and sisters, and thus bear common witness to our Savior, Our Lord Jesus Christ."

=== The Anglican Communion ===
==== Historic tensions ====
Long-term hostility between the Catholic Church and the Anglican Communion was engendered by resistance among some English to the declaration of royal supremacy of King Henry VIII over the Church in England, the confiscation of Church properties, the dissolution of the monasteries, guilds and chantries, the execution of priests, forced attendance at Anglican worship, the forced payment of tithes to the state church and the illegalization of the Catholic faith.

There was a brief restoration of communion with Rome during the reign of Mary I of England. Her death marked the end of Catholic attempts to reconcile by law the English Church to Rome. Subsequently, Pope Pius V's excommunication of Elizabeth I of England in 1570 and authorisation of rebellion against her contributed to official suspicion of the allegiances of English Catholics. This, combined with a desire to assert the claims of the established church, led to the promulgation of restrictive laws against their civil and religious rights. Elizabethan era restrictions were only relieved through several legislative reforms in the 19th century, cumulatively known as Catholic emancipation. The last restriction on Catholics preventing them from marrying into the royal family was removed in 2013, though they cannot become monarch since as such they would be the head of the Church of England.

===== Apostolicae curae =====
In 1896 Pope Leo XIII issued Apostolicae curae rejecting the Anglo-Catholic claims of the Oxford Movement and the Chicago-Lambeth Quadrilateral, such as apostolic succession. In it Leo XIII declared Anglican orders "absolutely null and utterly void." The official reply of the Archbishops of the Church of England was Saepius officio. The judgment remains in effect to the present. The judgment of nullity was reaffirmed in 1998 by the Congregation for the Doctrine of the Faith, when it gave Apostolicae curae as an example of the authoritative teaching of the Catholic Church.

===== Early ecumenism =====
Some attempts at dialogue began in 1915, when Pope Benedict XV approved a British Legation to the Vatican, led by an Anglican with a Catholic deputy. However, discussion of potential reunion in the Malines Conversations eventually collapsed in 1925. Continued efforts resulted in the spread of the Week of Prayer for Christian Unity in both churches (and others), and the visit of George Bell, Bishop of Chichester, to Cardinal Giovanni Montini of Milan in 1955.

==== Post–Second Vatican Council developments ====
Real rapprochement was achieved under the leadership of Pope John XXIII, whose foundation of the "Secretariat for the Promotion of Christian Unity" encouraged Archbishop Geoffrey Fisher to make a historic, though not entirely official, visit to the Vatican in 1960. Subsequently, the Bishop of Ripon, John Moorman, led a delegation of Anglican observers to the Second Vatican Council. In 1966, Archbishop Michael Ramsey made an official visit to Pope Paul VI, and in the following year, the Anglican–Roman Catholic International Commission (ARCIC) was established. Its first project focused on the authority of Scripture, and the commission has since produced nine agreed statements. Phase One of ARCIC ended in 1981 with the publication of a final report, Elucidations on Authority in the Church. Phase Two has been ongoing since 1983. The most recent agreed statement dealt with Marian theology, and was published in 2004.

Paul VI went so far as to refer to the Anglican Church as "our beloved sister Church", though this description might not tie in with present thinking in the Vatican. Until recently it was used by the website of the Roman Catholic Ampleforth College (referring to Anglican pupils at that school).

"Given the significant extent of our common understanding of the Eucharist [...] and the central importance of the Eucharist to our faith," ARCIC wrote in a non-authoritative statement, Growing together in unity and mission (GTUM), that "we encourage attendance at each other's Eucharists, respecting the different disciplines of our churches." (Note: GTUM refers to the Directory for the Application of Principles and Norms on Ecumenism, which cites the Catholic Church canon law which defines the licit administration and reception of certain sacraments of the Catholic Church in normative and in particular exceptional circumstances contained within 1983 Code of Canon Law canon 844, which pertains only to the Latin Church, and the parallel 1990 Code of Canons of the Eastern Churches canon 671, which pertains to the other sui iuris Churches which collectively make up the Eastern Catholic Churches in the Catholic Church.) GTUM suggests that "We encourage Anglicans and Roman Catholics to pray for the local bishop of the other church as well as for their own bishop, and for God's blessing on their co-operation where possible in their leadership of the local churches' mission. We welcome the growing Anglican custom of including in the prayers of the faithful a prayer for the pope, and we invite Roman Catholics to pray regularly in public for the Archbishop of Canterbury and the leaders of the Anglican Communion." Since both mutually recognize their administration of baptism, GTUM suggests that "a number of practical initiatives are possible. Local churches may consider developing joint programmes for the formation of families when they present children for baptism, as well as preparing common catechetical resources for use in baptismal and confirmation preparation and in Sunday schools. We suggest that our local parishes regularly make a public profession of faith together, perhaps by renewing baptismal promises at Pentecost each year. We invite local churches to use the same baptismal certificate, and, where necessary, to review and improve those currently in use. While respecting current canonical requirements, we also encourage the inclusion of witnesses from the other church at baptisms and confirmations, particularly in the case of candidates from interchurch families."

===== New tensions =====
Despite the productivity of these discussions, dialogue is strained by the developments in some provinces of the Anglican Communion of the ordination of women, of permissive teaching on abortion, and of the ordination of those in public same-sex sexual relationships as priests and, in one case, a bishop (Gene Robinson). More progress has been made with respect to Anglican churches outside the Communion.

Cardinal Walter Kasper, president of the Pontifical Council for Promoting Christian Unity, warned that if the Church of England was to ordain women as bishops, as the Episcopal Church has done, then it could destroy any chance of reuniting the Anglican and Catholic churches. Although ARCIC had completed a major document on Marian theology in 2003, John Paul II temporarily called off all future talks between the Catholic Church and the Anglican Communion after the consecration of Gene Robinson as bishop.

John Paul II made Pastoral Provision for Anglican congregations which as a whole wish to enter into full communion with the Holy See. There has been only a small number of Anglican Use parishes, all of which are in the United States. These are Roman Catholic parishes which are allowed to retain some features of the Book of Common Prayer in worship. Additionally, one of the Continuing Anglican Churches attempted to achieve the recognition of Rome without abandoning its liturgical traditions, as the Anglican Use parishes have done.

According to canon 844 of the 1983 Code of Canon Law of the Latin Church, Catholics should not receive communion from an Anglican minister and Catholic ministers could administer to an Anglican the sacraments of Eucharist, Penance and Anointing of the Sick only in danger of death or some other grave and pressing need, and provided the Anglican in question cannot approach an Anglican priest, spontaneously asks for the sacrament, demonstrates the faith of the Catholic Church in respect of the sacrament and is properly disposed (canon 844 §4).

===== Personal ordinariates =====
In October 2009, the Congregation for the Doctrine of the Faith announced Pope Benedict XVI's intention to create a new type of ecclesiastical structure, called a personal ordinariate, for groups of Anglicans entering into full communion with the see of Rome. The plan created the personal ordinariate structures for former Anglicans within the Catholic Church independent of existing Latin Church dioceses. It would allow them to preserve elements of Anglican liturgy, spirituality and religious practice, including married priests but not married bishops. Anglicanorum coetibus was issued on 4 November 2009. "The Personal Ordinariate of the Chair of St. Peter is equivalent to a diocese, created by the Vatican in 2012 for people nurtured in the Anglican tradition who wish to become Catholic."

=== Old Catholic Church ===
The Old Catholic Archdiocese of Utrecht was formed in 1703 (Note: McNamara, Edward (14 February 2012). "The Old Catholic and Polish National Churches". ewtn.com. Irondale, AL: Eternal Word Television Network. Republished from "The Old Catholic and Polish National Churches". zenit.org. Rome. 14 February 2012. Archived from the original on 5 January 2015.) in the area occupied by the historical Roman Catholic Archdiocese of Utrecht, which had been canonically suppressed in response to the Protestant Reformation in 1580 and superseded by the Dutch Mission erected in 1592.

After 1870 several German-speaking Catholics left the Catholic Church in light of the First Vatican Council. Many aligned themselves with the independent Bishop of Utrecht, who ordained clergy among them to form the Old Catholic churches. Though it is not in communion, the Catholic Church recognizes as valid the Old Catholic holy orders and apostolic succession, but does not recognize their ordinations of women to the priesthood begun in the 1970s. The Old Catholic churches consider themselves to be in full communion with the Anglican Communion.

The Polish National Catholic Church ceased intercommunion with both the Anglican Communion in 1978 and the Union of Utrecht member churches in 1996, disagreeing over the issue of female ordination. It has since become closer to Rome, which recognizes it to have a similar status as the Orthodox churches.

=== Reformed churches (Continental Reformed, Presbyterian, and Congregationalist) ===
In 2010, the Catholic Church and the Reformed churches ratified the Common Agreement on Mutual Recognition of Baptism. As such, both the Catholic Church and the Reformed churches recognize the validity of baptism performed in each of these denominations.

=== Pentecostal and Charismatic churches ===
Since 2021, the United States Conference of Catholic Bishops (USCCB) has been in ecumenical discussion with the Pentecostal/Charismatic Churches of North America (PCCNA), as well as discussing the possibility of future theological dialogue between Pentecostalism and Catholicism.

== Practical ecumenism and church attendance ==
In many areas of the United Kingdom where there is only one Christian church (such as Anglican, Baptist, Methodist or United Reformed), it may "extend a Declaration of Ecumenical Welcome and Commitment to Christians of other denominations inviting them to be part of the life and witness of that worshipping congregation." The following guidelines were offered by the Catholic Bishops' Conference of England and Wales for the faithful:

3. Catholics who are committed to the life of their parish are encouraged to respond positively to these Declarations by exercising their Christian ministry within the village in which they live; by participating in Christian outreach and service undertaken by the congregation engaging in prayer, discussion and study groups and serving on such committees as are appropriate.

4. At the Eucharistic celebrations of other Christians (i) Catholics, if invited, may receive a blessing at Communion time (ii), and may;

- Read the lesson
- Take part in intercessory prayer
- Participate in music, dance and drama.

5. At Non-Eucharistic services of other Christians (iii) Catholics may

- Participate in planning and leading the service
- Read the lesson and Gospel
- Give the address
- Lead or take part in intercessory prayer
- Participate in music, dance and drama

Roman Catholic Archbishop John Bathersby and Anglican Bishop David Beetge, who chair the International Anglican–Roman Catholic Commission for Unity and Mission, encouraged Protestants and Catholics to attend one another's services, although not receiving Holy Communion at them, as delineated in Growing Together in Unity and Mission:

Given the significant extent of our common understanding of the Eucharist (cf. paragraphs 39 to 44 above), and the central importance of the Eucharist to our faith, we encourage attendance at each other's Eucharists, respecting the different disciplines of our churches (101). This is particularly appropriate during the Week of Prayer for Christian Unity and other festive occasions in the life of our local communities. This would provide opportunities for experiencing each other's eucharistic life, thereby serving both to deepen our communion and our desire for full communion. While this would take the form of noncommunicating attendance in each other's churches, it would nonetheless initiate a renewed awareness of the value of spiritual communion. We commend the offering of a blessing which has become a regular practice in some places for those who may not receive holy communion.

Pope Francis said that in northern Argentina, the Anglican bishop and Roman Catholic bishop, both of whom are friends, work together to teach at Christian missions with the aborigines. With the Congregation for the Doctrine of the Faith having knowledge of this, both Anglicans and Roman Catholics attend each other's Masses, engaging "in charity together". Praising this ecumenism, Pope Francis declared that "I think this is a richness that our young Churches can bring to Europe and to the Churches that have a great tradition." Pope Francis recalled his own friendship with the Anglicans of Buenos Aires, given that the Anglican Cathedral of St. John the Baptist was juxtaposed with the Roman Catholic parish of Merced.

== Major documents ==
=== Council documents ===
- 1274 Second Council of Lyon, Session IV: Declaration of Union with the Greek Churches
- 1439 Council of Basle-Ferrara-Florence, Laetentur Caeli: Bull of Union with the Greeks
- 1964 Second Vatican Council, Lumen gentium: Dogmatic Constitution on the Church
- 1964 Second Vatican Council, Unitatis redintegratio: Decree on Ecumenism

=== Papal documents ===
Pope Leo XIII

- 1896 Apostolicae curae
- 1899 Testem benevolentiae nostrae

Pope Pius XI

- 1928 Mortalium animos

Pope Pius XII

- 1950 Humani generis

Pope John XXIII

- 1962 Gaudet Mater Ecclesia

Pope John Paul II

- 1995 Ut unum sint
- 1995 Orientale lumen
- 1999 Joint Declaration on the Doctrine of Justification

=== Curial documents ===
- 1993 Directory for the Application of Principles and Norms on Ecumenism
- 1995 The Ecumenical Dimension in the Formation of Those Engaged in Pastoral Work
- 2000 Dominus Iesus

=== Extracts ===
Some elements of the Roman Catholic perspective on ecumenism are illustrated in the following quotations from the Second Vatican Council's 1964 decree on ecumenism, Unitatis Redintegratio (UR) and John Paul II's 1995 encyclical, Ut unum sint (UUS).

Every renewal of the Church is essentially grounded in an increase of fidelity to her own calling. Undoubtedly this is the basis of the movement toward unity ... There can be no ecumenism worthy of the name without a change of heart. For it is from renewal of the inner life of our minds, from self-denial and an unstinted love that desires of unity take their rise and develop in a mature way. We should therefore pray to the Holy Spirit for the grace to be genuinely self-denying, humble, gentle in the service of others, and to have an attitude of brotherly generosity towards them. ... The words of St. John hold good about sins against unity: "If we say we have not sinned, we make him a liar, and his word is not in us". So we humbly beg pardon of God and of our separated brethren, just as we forgive them that trespass against us. (UR, 6-7)

Christians cannot underestimate the burden of long-standing misgivings inherited from the past, and of mutual misunderstandings and prejudices. Complacency, indifference and insufficient knowledge of one another often make this situation worse. Consequently, the commitment to ecumenism must be based upon the conversion of hearts and upon prayer, which will also lead to the necessary purification of past memories. With the grace of the Holy Spirit, the Lord's disciples, inspired by love, by the power of the truth and by a sincere desire for mutual forgiveness and reconciliation, are called to re-examine together their painful past and the hurt which that past regrettably continues to provoke even today. (UUS, 2)

In ecumenical dialogue, Catholic theologians standing fast by the teaching of the Church and investigating the divine mysteries with the separated brethren must proceed with love for the truth, with charity, and with humility. When comparing doctrines with one another, they should remember that in Catholic doctrine there exists a "hierarchy" of truths, since they vary in their relation to the fundamental Christian faith. Thus the way will be opened by which through fraternal rivalry all will be stirred to a deeper understanding and a clearer presentation of the unfathomable riches of Christ (UR, 11)

The unity willed by God can be attained only by the adherence of all to the content of revealed faith in its entirety. In matters of faith, compromise is in contradiction with God who is Truth. In the Body of Christ, "the way, and the truth, and the life" (Jn 14:6), who could consider legitimate a reconciliation brought about at the expense of the truth?...Even so, doctrine needs to be presented in a way that makes it understandable to those for whom God himself intends it. (UUS, 18-19)

When the obstacles to perfect ecclesiastical communion have been gradually overcome, all Christians will at last, in a common celebration of the Eucharist, be gathered into the one and only Church in that unity which Christ bestowed on His Church from the beginning. We believe that this unity subsists in the Catholic Church as something she can never lose, and we hope that it will continue to increase until the end of time. (UR, 4)

== See also ==
- East–West Schism
- International Council of Christians and Jews, a group engaged in Christian-Jewish dialogue
- John Paul II Center for Interreligious Dialogue
- Pontifical Council for Interreligious Dialogue
- Protestant Reformation
- Timeline of the Catholic Church
