= Unitatis redintegratio =

1964 Catholic decree on ecumenism

Unitatis redintegratio (Restoration of unity) is the Second Vatican Council's decree on ecumenism. It was passed by a vote of 2,137 to 11 of the bishops assembled at the council, and was promulgated by Pope Paul VI on 21 November 1964.

The title of the document is taken from the opening words of the Latin text. The opening words of the official English translation are: "The restoration of unity among all Christians is one of the principal concerns of the Second Vatican Council."

== Description ==
Unitatis Redintegratio calls for the reunion of Christendom and is similar to a previous call for unity by Pope Leo XIII in his 1894 encyclical letter Praeclara gratulationis publicae and by Pope Pius IX in his encyclical In Suprema Petri Apostoli Sede. However, Unitatis articulates a different kind of ecclesiology from Praeclara. It focuses on the unity of the people of God and on separated Christian brethren rather than insisting according to the classical formulation that schismatics must return to the fold under the unity of the Vicar of Christ.

Unitatis acknowledges that there are serious problems facing prospects of reunion with Reformation communities that make no attempt to claim apostolic succession as the Anglican communion does. Ecclesial communities which adhere to Calvinism are a particularly challenging case because they and Catholicism have important doctrinal differences on key issues such as ecclesiology, liturgy and mariology. Other communities have insoluble doctrinal differences with Catholic Christianity because their theology of the Holy Trinity is manifestly incompatible with the doctrine as articulated by the council of Nicaea in the early Church.

== Subsequent developments ==
The Council's Decree on Priestly Training (1965) stated that

The circumstances of various regions being duly considered, students are to be brought to a fuller understanding of the churches and ecclesial communities separated from the Apostolic Roman See, so that they may be able to contribute to the work of re-establishing unity among all Christians according to the prescriptions of this holy synod.

Pope John Paul II refers to and builds on the teaching of Unitatis Redintegratio in his encyclical letter of 25 May 1995, Ut unum sint.

Cardinal Walter Kasper discussed the status of the problems by the document on the 40th anniversary of the promulgation of Unitatis in remarks entitled "The Decree on Ecumenism – Read Anew After Forty Years".

== See also ==
- Catholic Church and ecumenism
- Separated brethren
- Satis Cognitum, Pope Leo XIII, 29 June 1896
- Mortalium animos, Pope Pius XI, 1928
- Ut unum sint, Pope John Paul II, 25 May 1995
