= Separated brethren =

Roman Catholic term for Protestants

Separated brethren is a term sometimes used by the Roman Catholic Church and its clergy and members to refer to baptized members of other Christian traditions. The phrase is a translation of the Latin phrase fratres seiuncti. It is largely used as a polite euphemism in contexts where the terms "formal heretics" or "material heretics" might cause offense.

Since the Council of Trent, which formally condemned Protestant doctrines as heretical, the Catholic Church officially deems Protestants as material or formal "heretics", and has always taught that "outside the Church there is no salvation". However, Biblical passages like Romans 2:12-16 point to the importance of conscience in Catholic soteriology, which the Church states it has always recognized. In c. 1960 – c. 1962, preparatory work for draft texts of Second Vatican Council documents "report urged respectful use of the terms dissidents or separated brethren, in place of heretics and schismatics." After the Council, however, "that habit of unthinkingly hurling accusations of heresy at Protestants pretty much died out" in some contexts to avoid offense. Since at least the mid-1990s, the term has often been replaced by Catholics with phrases such as "other Christians".

There are similar moves to avoid offense to other religious groups. During a period of improving Catholic-Jewish relations, Pope John Paul II once referred to Jews as "elder brothers in the faith of Abraham", prior to his 1987 visit to the United States.

== History ==
The concept and wording was published as early as 1793, in a discourse which examined two papal briefs to the Bishop of Chiusi-Pienza. Frank Flinn wrote, in Encyclopedia of Catholicism, that in 1959 Pope John XXIII "addressed Protestants as separated brethren," in Ad Petri cathedram (APC), which Flinn saw as "an important step toward recognizing Protestants as legitimate partners in a future dialogue." (Note: The excerpt, from APC, 63 cited by Flinn, is translated on the Vatican website as "the communities that are separated from the See of Blessed Peter" and a related excerpt, from APC, 64, is translated on the Vatican website as "those who are adorned with the name of Christian even though separated from Us and from one another.") But Pope Leo XIII "was the first to speak of 'separated brothers'" according to John Norman Davidson Kelly's A Dictionary of Popes. Edward Farrugia, in Gregorianum, describes the development from Pope Leo XIII's Orientalium dignitas (OD) to Orientalium Ecclesiarum (OE) to Unitatis Redintegratio (UR). "Yet if OE builds on OD, differences remain. Whereas OD" 186 "speaks of 'dissident bretheren' (fratres dissidentes), OE 28 speaks of 'separated bretheren' (fratres seiunctos), although it does not go as far as UR 14, where there is an inchoative use of the language of 'sister Churches' (inter Ecclesia locales, ut inter sorores) in regards to the sisterhood of Eastern Churches." It does not refer to a sisterhood between Catholic and Orthodox Churches, nor between Catholic and Protestant Churches. Farrugia noted Austin Flannery's translations in Vatican Council II, "OE 29 speaks of the 'separated Churches' and OE 25 of 'any separated Eastern Christians', and OE 29 of 'Eastern separated brethren'." J. M. R. Tillard goes into detail, in New Catholic Encyclopedia, about "the development of a carefully nuanced vocabulary, consistent with Vatican II Ecclesiology," which evolved from "the idea of membership in favor of that of incorporation" and has its categorization found in the dogmatic constitution Lumen gentium (LG) which Tillard describes:

- Catholics are defined as "'being incorporated' (incorporatio), qualifying the term with the adverb 'fully' (plene) and emphasizing that full incorporation requires the presence of the Holy Spirit." (Note: LG 14.2 quoted by Tillard.)
- Non-Catholics and catechumens are defined as "'being linked' (conjunctio) to the Church, again carefully stressing the role of the Holy Spirit in each case." (Note: LG 14.3; 15.2 quoted by Tillard.)
- Non-Christians are defined as "'being related' (ordinantur), a term that suggests a dynamic relationship, an orientation toward the Church." (Note: LG 16 quoted by Tillard.)

"Every shade of difference in meaning among these terms is important," emphasizes Tillard. "But the terms acquire their full force only in the light of the most authoritative commentaries on them," UR and Nostra aetate (NA). "Then, supposing the nuances indicated, the richness of such expressions as the following becomes clear: 'Churches and ecclesial communities'; (Note: UR 3.3 quoted by Tillard; cf. LG 15.1 cited in Tillard.) 'separated brethren'; (Note: brothers divided; UR 3.4 quoted by Tillard.) 'separated Churches and ecclesial communities'; (Note: UR 3.4 quoted by Tillard.) 'full communion'—'imperfect communion'." (Note: UR 3.1 quoted by Tillard.)

"But thanks to its ecclesiology," wrote Tillard, "Vatican II was able to affirm at the same time that Churches or ecclesial communities separated from the Catholic Church are part of the single Church, and that nevertheless incorporation in Christ and His Church possesses within the Catholic Church the fullness that it does not have elsewhere." Tillard's view, however, went far beyond the texts of the Second Vatican Council, which never stated that "churches or ecclesial communities" separated from the Catholic Church were somehow "a part of it"; indeed, the Council itself in the decree Orientalium Ecclesiarum explicitly stated just the opposite: "The Holy Catholic Church, which is the Mystical Body of Christ, is made up of the faithful who are organically united in the Holy Spirit by the same faith, the same sacraments and the same government[...]." Tillard's view was further refuted in the document Dominus Iesus issued by Pope Benedict XVI.

In 2007, the Congregation for the Doctrine of the Faith (CDF) clarified "the authentic meaning" of the ecclesiological expression "Church" which "according to Catholic doctrine", the texts of the Second Vatican Council and those of the Magisterium since the Second Vatican Council do not call Christian Communities born out of the Reformation of the 16th century as "Churches" because "these Communities do not enjoy apostolic succession in the sacrament of Orders, and are, therefore, deprived of a constitutive element of the Church." William Whalen wrote, in Separated Brethren, that "'separated brethren' refers to Christians united by baptism and committed to Jesus Christ but divided by theological beliefs." Whalen explained, that Protestant Reformation Christians broke "the bond of common faith" and "they became separated brethren." "All Christians who are baptized and believe in Christ but are not professed Catholics" are separated brethren, according to John Hardon in Modern Catholic Dictionary. "More commonly the term is applied to Protestants." Likewise, "separated brethren" according to Catholic Answers, in This Rock, "refers to those who, though separated from full communion with the Catholic Church, have been justified through baptism and are thus brethren in Christ." UR "teaches that 'all who have been justified by faith in baptism are members of Christ's body, and have a right to be called Christian, and so are correctly accepted as brothers by the children of the Catholic Church'." J. A. Jungmann and K. Stasiak wrote, in New Catholic Encyclopedia, that "the Second Vatican Council's call for a greater spirit of ecumenism among churches and ecclesial communities reflects the understanding that Baptism is the effecting and the sign of the fundamental unity of all Christians." (Note: According to the 1983 Code of Canon Law (1983 CIC), baptism "is validly conferred only by a washing of true water with the proper form of words." The 1983 CIC states that "in a case of necessity any person with the right intention, confers baptism licitly." "Those baptized in a non-Catholic ecclesial community must not be baptized conditionally unless, after an examination of the matter and the form of the words used in the conferral of baptism and a consideration of the intention of the baptized adult and the minister of the baptism, a serious reason exists to doubt the validity of the baptism." See CCC. n. 1278. "The essential rite of Baptism consists in immersing the candidate in water or pouring water on his head, while pronouncing the invocation of the Most Holy Trinity: the Father, the Son, and the Holy Spirit." "The Catholic Church recognizes as valid baptisms performed by other churches and ecclesial communities if these two conditions are met, and if there is no serious reason to question either the intention of the minister and the free acceptance of Baptism by the one baptized.")

== Exclusions ==
As Mormonism is polytheistic in its understanding of the Trinity, (Note: The theologies of God in Christianity and God in Mormonism are different. Also see Richard Abanes in Inside today's Mormonism. Pope John Paul II said: "The Christian doctrine on the Trinity, confirmed by the Councils, explicitly rejects any form of 'tritheism' or 'polytheism'." See CCC. n. 2112. "The first commandment condemns polytheism.") the Catholic Church does not recognize the validity of Mormon baptism (Note: Pope John Paul II approved the Congregation for the Doctrine of the Faith's 2001 decision. Luis Ladaria, later head of the Congregation for the Doctrine of the Faith, wrote in 2001, that the reasons for deciding that "it is not Christian Baptism" are that a "divergence on Trinity and baptism invalidates the intention of the Mormon minister of baptism and of the one to be baptized." Contrast with Alonzo Gaskill in FARMS Review of Books.) and Mormons are not considered separated brethren." Cardinal Urbano Navarrete Cortés clarified, in L'Osservatore Romano, "that in all of the effects of the pastoral, administrative and juridical practices of the Church, the Mormons are not to be considered as belonging to an 'ecclesial community not in full communion with the Catholic Church', but simply as non-baptized."

Baptism conferred by The Christian Community, founded by Rudolf Steiner; The New Church, founded by Emanuel Swedenborg; conferred with the formula "I baptize you in the name of the Creator, and of the Redeemer, and of the Sanctifier"; or, conferred with the formula "I baptize you in the name of the Creator, and of the Liberator, and of the Sustainer" are also deemed invalid.
