= Joint Declaration of Pope Francis and Patriarch Kirill =

2016 statement by the Catholic and Russian Orthodox leaders

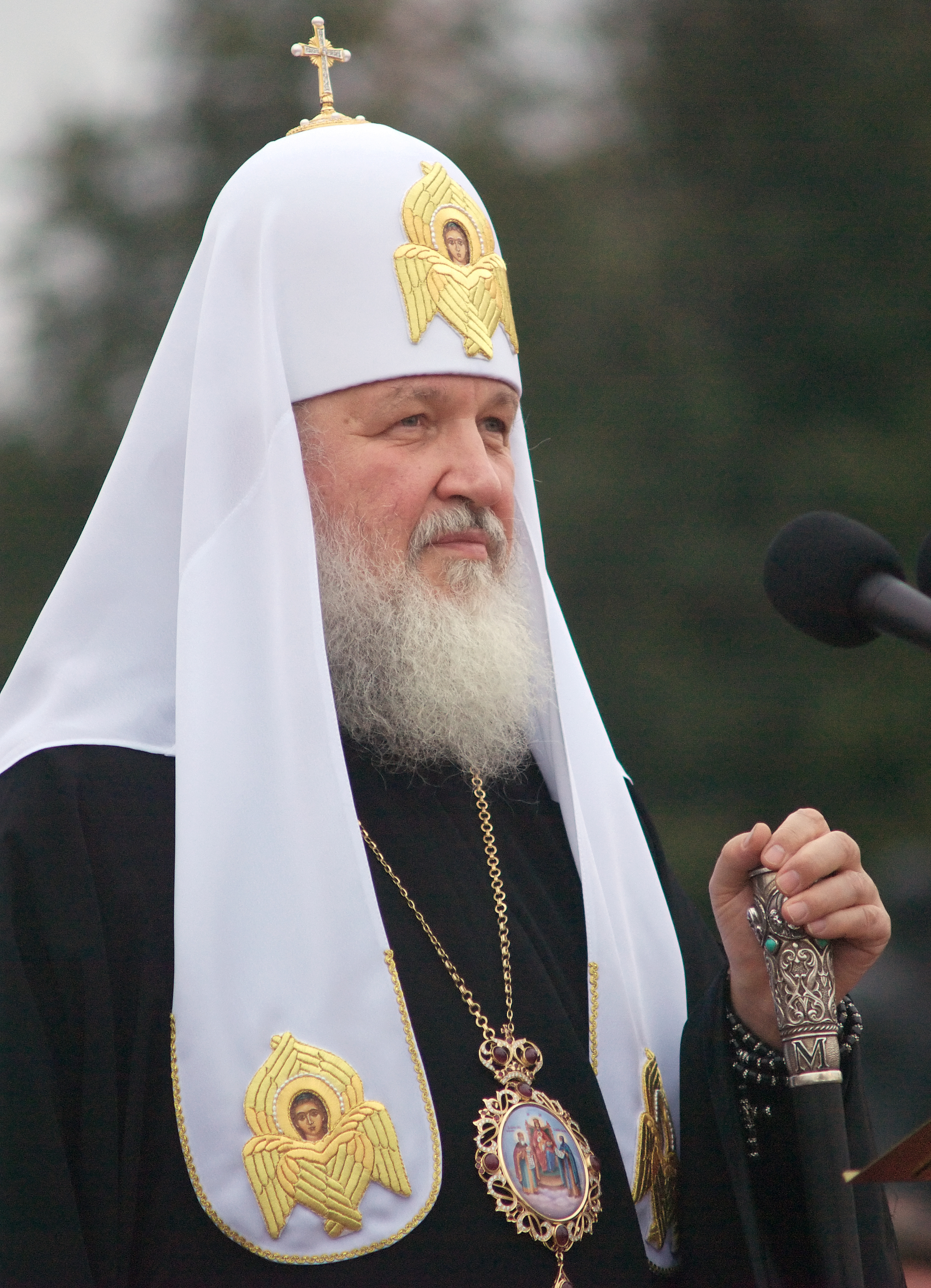
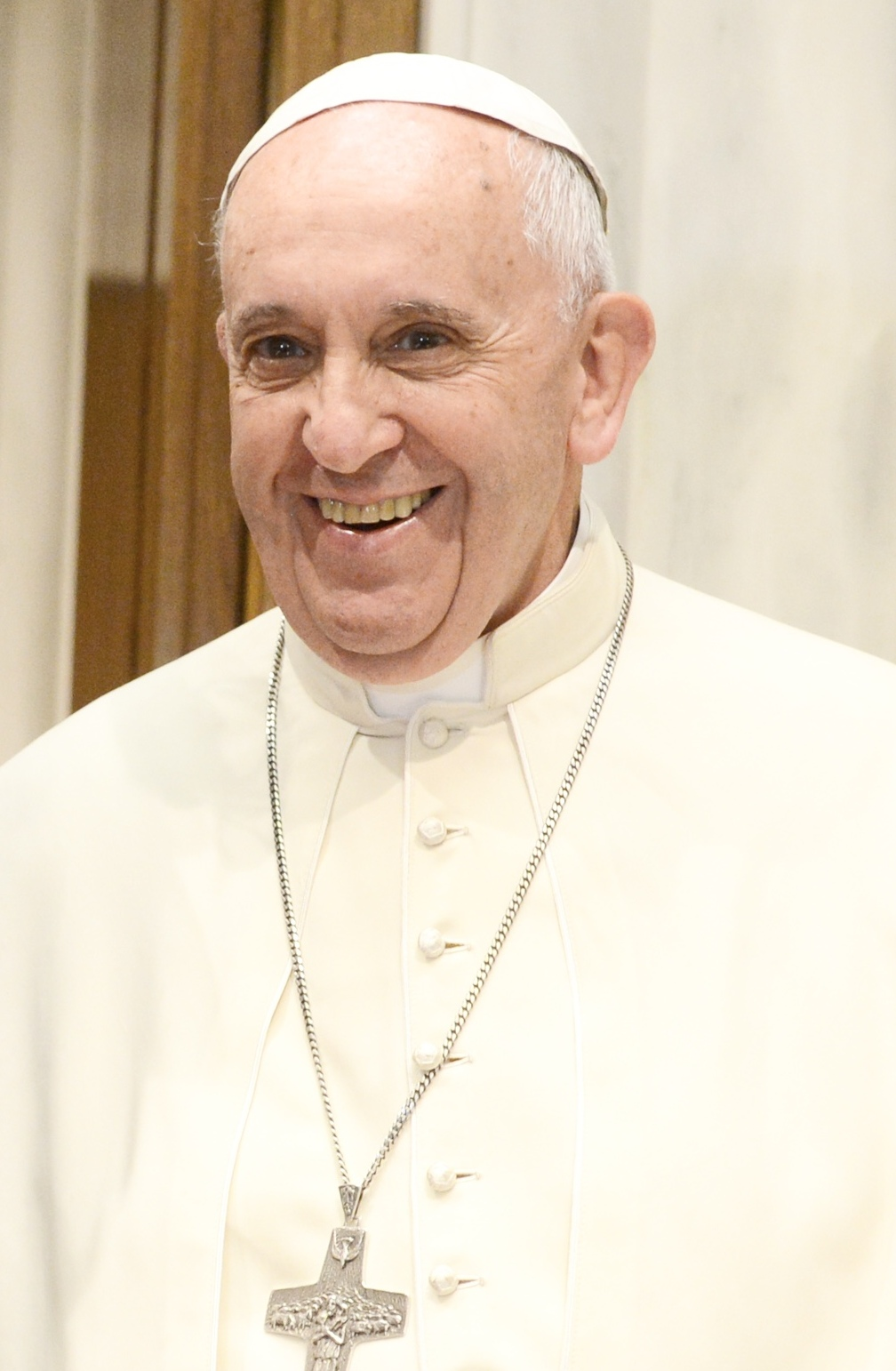
Patriarch Kirill (left) in 2009 and Pope Francis (right) in 2015

The Joint Declaration of Pope Francis and Patriarch Kirill (Russian: Совместная декларация Папы Франциска и Патриарха Кирилла) also known as the Havana Declaration (Russian: Гаванская декларация) was issued following the first meeting in February 2016 between Pope Francis, who, as the Bishop of Rome, was the pontiff of the Catholic Church, and Patriarch Kirill of Moscow, Patriarch of Moscow and all Rus', Patriarch of the Russian Orthodox Church (ROC), the largest of the Eastern Orthodox churches. This was the first time leaders of the Catholic Church and the Moscow Patriarchate had met. While the meeting was also seen as a symbolic moment in the history of relations between the Catholic Church and the Orthodox churches as a community, which had split in the Great Schism of 1054, centuries before the Moscow Patriarchate was constituted, it was not expected to lead to any immediate rapprochement between them.

The 30-point declaration contains a joint call by the two church primates to end the persecution of Christians in the Middle East and wars in the region, expressing their hope that the meeting might contribute to the re-establishment of Christian unity between the two churches. A range of other issues are mentioned in the declaration, including atheism, secularism, capitalism, consumerism, economic and social inequality, migrants and refugees, the importance of heterosexual marriage and the family, and concerns relating to abortion and euthanasia.

According to the ROC leadership's public statements made before and after the Havana meeting, while the document stresses that both churches share the tradition of the first millennium of Christianity, the discussion during the meeting did not attempt to mend any of the persisting doctrinal and ecclesiastical differences between the two churches. The Declaration however includes statements about Eastern Catholic Churches in line with the Balamand declaration as well as the Russo-Ukrainian war. The Ukrainian Greek Catholic Church expressed disappointment, and Ukrainian Orthodox Church of the Kyivan Patriarchate criticised the latter.

== Background ==
The Great Schism of 1054 split Christianity between Greek East and Latin West. Attempts were made over the subsequent centuries to heal the rift, such as the 1274 Second Council of Lyon and the 1439 Council of Florence, but these failed. More recent attempts to foster closer relations between the churches included the Catholic–Orthodox Joint Declaration of 1965 following the 1964 meeting between Pope Paul VI and the Ecumenical Patriarch Athenagoras I of Constantinople in Jerusalem. Following that meeting and declaration, a number of meetings, visits and symbolic events had taken place involving Catholic and Orthodox leaders (including visits by Pope John Paul II, and especially between several popes and Bartholomew I of Constantinople), but never a meeting between a Pope and a leader of the Russian Orthodox Church. The first time a Pope visited a predominantly Eastern Orthodox country was in 1999 when Pope John Paul II visited Romania. Since 1980, regular plenary sessions of the Joint International Commission for Theological Dialogue Between the Catholic Church and the Orthodox Church, the latter being led by the Church of Constantinople, had been held.

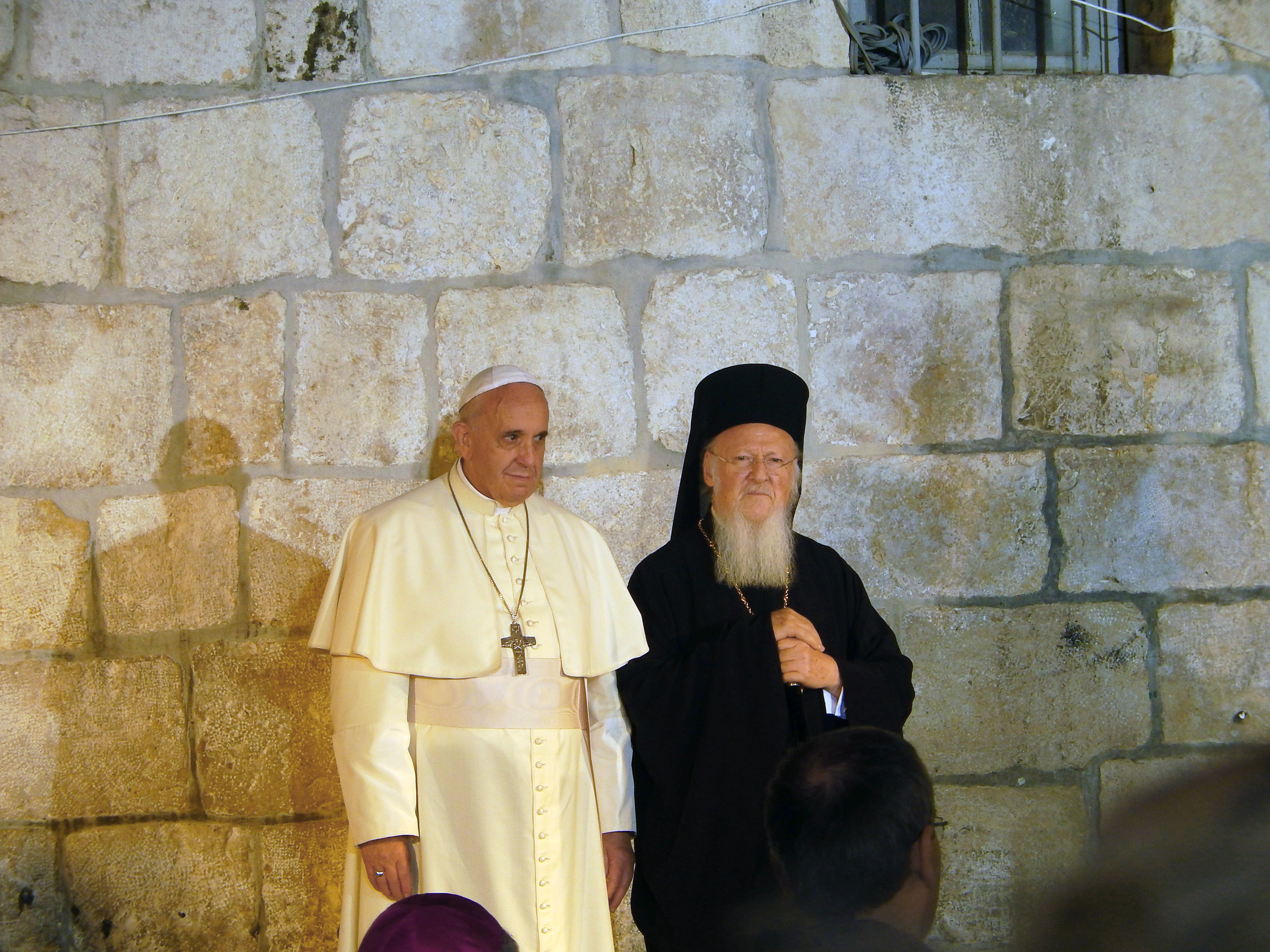
Pope Francis and Patriarch Bartholomew in the Church of the Holy Sepulchre in Jerusalem in 2014

Within the communion of the autocephalous (administratively independent) local (national) churches of Orthodoxy, the Ecumenical Patriarch of Constantinople – based in what is now Turkey's Istanbul – is recognized as the bishop who enjoys primus inter pares status, albeit having no direct administrative powers over the other Orthodox churches. The Russian Orthodox Church (Moscow Patriarchate) which became autocephalous near the end of the 16th century is considered the largest denomination of the local Orthodox churches; it has close ties with the Russian state, thus according a geopolitical significance to a meeting of its Patriarch with a pope. The decentralised nature of Orthodoxy meant that such meetings could not have direct significance for pan-Orthodox issues. Two weeks earlier, the leaders of the Orthodox churches, including Kirill, met in Chambésy, Switzerland, to make final preparations for a historic Great and Holy Council of the Orthodox Church, rescheduled for June 2016.

According to the ROC, it began a bilateral dialogue with the Catholic Church in 1967, and the ROC began a theological dialogue with the Catholic Church in 1979. Attempts had previously been made to arrange a meeting between a pope and a Russian patriarch, but these attempts had failed. Tensions had risen between the churches after the fall of Communism as the Churches "moved to pick up the pieces". Negotiations had been held in the 1990s for a possible meeting between Patriarch Alexy II of Moscow and Pope John Paul II. According to the United States Bureau of Democracy, Human Rights, and Labor, the two churches established a joint working group, which met in May and September 2004, to discuss specific concerns. Representatives of both churches reported that the working group contributed to an improved atmosphere. In an August 2004 gesture of reconciliation, John Paul II presented an 18th-century copy of the icon of Our Lady of Kazan to Alexy II. (Note: The 18th-century copy of the icon was smuggled out the Soviet Union under unclear circumstances. It was purchased by the Blue Army of Our Lady of Fátima and enshrined in Fátima, Portugal, in the 1970s. It was donated to the Vatican in 1993. In 2005, Alexy II and President Mintimer Shaimiev of the Republic of Tatarstan placed the icon in the Annunciation Cathedral at the Kazan Kremlin in the Republic of Tatarstan, Russian Federation. A different copy of that icon, presented by Kirill to Francis, was prominently displayed at the signing ceremony.) In April 2005, John Paul II died, and Cardinal Joseph Ratzinger was elected as Pope Benedict XVI. In April 2005, ROC Bishop Hilarion Alfeyev, as chairman of the Representation of the Russian Orthodox Church to the European Institutions, proposed "a European Catholic–Orthodox Alliance". In May 2005, Cardinal Walter Kasper proposed convoking "a synod of reconciliation" on the 1,000th anniversary of the Council of Bari in 2098, and proposed an alliance with Orthodox and Protestants against secularism. This alliance would "help one another mutually in favor of common values, of a culture of life, of the dignity of the person, of solidarity and social justice, of peace and the safeguarding of creation," according to Kasper. In May, then-Metropolitan Kirill met with Benedict XVI in the Vatican, and they highlighted their commitment to working cooperatively. The possibility of a meeting of Kirill (elected Patriarch in 2009) with Benedict XVI had been explored prior to Benedict's retirement in March 2013, and Benedict met the future Patriarch Kirill in Rome in 2006 when Kirill was chairman of the Department of External Church Relations for the Moscow Patriarchate. (Note: For more on the background and the earlier meetings between Popes and Orthodox leaders, see 'Pope Francis, Patriarch Kirill and the God of Surprises' by US prelate and Catholic bishop Mitchell T. Rozanski.)

== Meeting in Havana ==
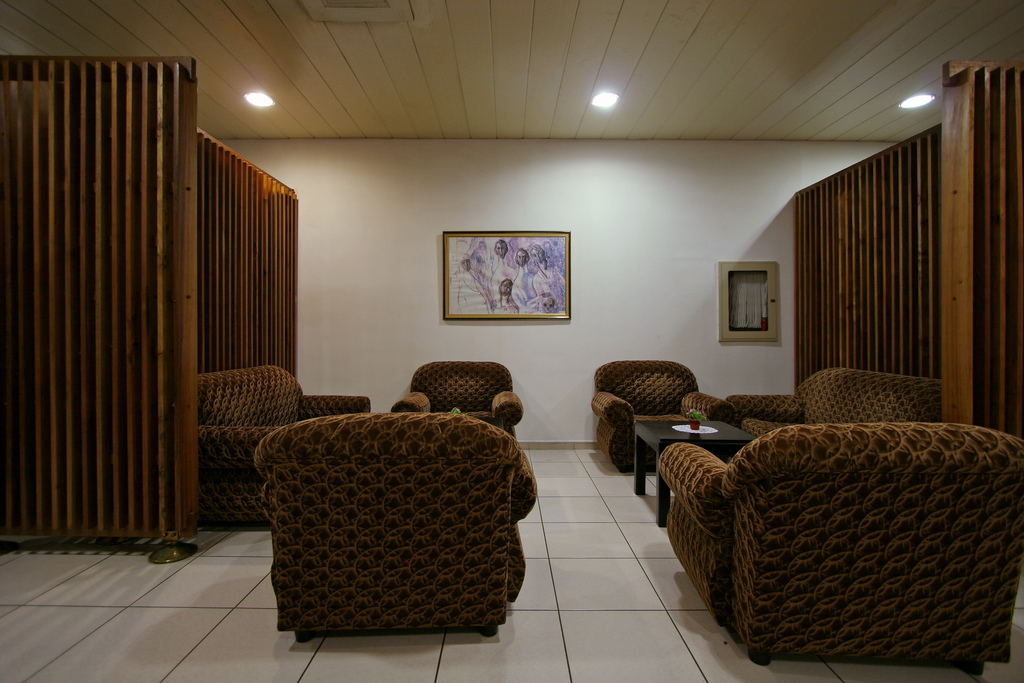
Havana airport VIP Lounge

Two years of secretive planning and months of detailed negotiation were necessary to arrange the meeting between Francis and Kirill. Francis was willing to meet Kirill, having said in November 2014: "I'll go wherever you want. You call me and I'll go." Agreement from the Russian Orthodox side was complicated by the church's close ties to the Russian state, which had recently annexed Crimea and invaded Donbas, both part of Ukraine. The pre-meeting announcement from the Moscow Patriarchate stated that they had agreed to "put aside internal disagreements" to focus on the plight of Christians being persecuted. Cuba, a significant location to both sides, provided the requirements for a neutral meeting place as neither Rome nor Moscow would have been suitable. The meeting, made possible by the timing of both leaders' visits to the region, was announced a week in advance on 5 February 2016.

The meeting took place on 12 February 2016 in a VIP room at José Martí International Airport near Havana, Cuba. Francis arrived at 2 pm local time, and the two leaders embraced and kissed. A 2-hour private meeting was followed by the signing of their joint declaration, which had been prepared in advance. Kirill was in Havana on an official visit as part of a regional tour, including visits to Brazil and Paraguay. Francis' airplane arrived at the airport on his way to his tour of Mexico.

Cuban dignitaries attending the occasion included President Raúl Castro, Cardinal Jaime Lucas Ortega y Alamino (Archbishop of San Cristóbal de la Habana) and Archbishop Dionisio García Ibáñez (of the Roman Catholic Archdiocese of Santiago de Cuba). The meeting itself was held in a private room and attended by translators and by the aides of the two leaders, in addition to Cardinal Kurt Koch, president of the Pontifical Council for Promoting Christian Unity, and Metropolitan Hilarion Alfeyev, chairman of the Department of External Church Relations for the Moscow Patriarchate.

At the end of the meeting, there was an exchange of gifts. Francis gave Kirill a chalice as well as a reliquary of the 9th-century Saint Cyril (buried in Rome). Kirill gave Francis a copy of the icon of the Our Lady of Kazan. Other presents exchanged were a Spanish-language translation of Kirill's book Freedom and Responsibility (2011) and a Russian-language translation of Francis's encyclical Laudato si' (2015).

Speaking to news media several days after the meeting, Patriarch Kirill said, citing as the reason "powerful forces" opposing such meeting (apart from the fearful Orthodox faithful), that the meeting had had to be prepared in strict secrecy; he also stressed that not a single theological issue had been discussed.

== Joint declaration ==
The joint declaration was published by the Holy See in Italian, Russian, English, German, French, Spanish, Portuguese, and Arabic. The Russian Orthodox Church published it in Russian, English, Italian, French, Spanish, and Ukrainian. It consisted of 30 numbered sections on a range of topics.

The first section of the declaration gives thanks for this meeting, "the first in history", and refers to the leaders as "brothers in the Christian faith". Sections 2 and 3 refer to their meeting place of Cuba as "the crossroads of North and South, East and West", and expressed joy at the growth of Christianity in Latin America. Sections 4–6 expresses their views on their shared spiritual tradition ("the first millennium of Christianity") and their hopes that their meeting "may contribute to the re-establishment of this unity willed by God".

Sections 7–21 refer to "the challenges of the contemporary world". Issues raised include the persecution of Christians in the Middle East and North Africa; the impact of civil war, chaos, and terrorist violence; the exodus of Christians from Syria and Iraq; and the suffering experienced by the faithful of other religious traditions. The declaration refers to the renewal of the Christian faith in Russia and Eastern Europe and the "breaking of the chains of militant atheism", the rise of secularism, capitalism, consumerism, economic and social inequality, migrants and refugees, and the place of Christianity in the process of European integration. Further sections emphasize the importance of the family and marriage between one man and one woman, and their concerns relating to abortion, euthanasia, and "biomedical reproduction technology".

The issues of the schism within the Orthodox community in Ukraine, the conflict between Ukraine's Catholic and Orthodox Christians, and the political situation in Ukraine are raised in sections 25–27.

The closing sections call on Catholics and Orthodox to "work together fraternally in proclaiming the Good News of salvation" and to "give shared witness to the Spirit of truth in these difficult times".

The declaration concludes with a prayer to Mary, who is invoked by the names of the "Blessed Virgin Mary" as well as "Holy Mother of God".

== Commentary and reactions ==
The meeting was characterised by news media commentators, who were largely uninformed of the pivotal facts concerning the history of Christianity in Russia and tending toward sensationalism, (Note: Maciej Gajek writes that although the meeting of Francis with Kirill was important, it was a political use of Kirill as a messenger conveying Putin's policy and not about faith. Gajek criticises the media, on newsweek.pl, for both failing to explain the order of precedence among the many Orthodox churches and implying that Kirill is more than just the leader of the Russian Orthodox Church. Gajek writes that the meeting was not a breakthrough in interreligious dialogue because Kirill is only the leader of the Russian Orthodox Church with no authority over other Orthodox churches; moreover, according to Gajek, there is no promise of a change in relations.) as being "historic", "richly symbolic", and as the "meeting of the millennium". Analysts also opine that the meeting had a geopolitical dimension, being about rivalries among Orthodox leaders, long-standing tensions within Ukrainian Orthodoxy, and about Russian President Vladimir Putin asserting Russia's influence on the world stage, motivated by his actions in Syria and Ukraine. Overall, the meeting was "not expected to lead to any immediate rapprochement between the Eastern and Western Churches".

Kirill has faced criticism over his policies that have brought the Russian Orthodox Church closer to the Russian state. In the 2012 Russian presidential election he supported Vladimir Putin, likening Putin's presidency to "a miracle from God". Yury Avvakumov, assistant professor of theology at the University of Notre Dame, describes the Moscow Patriarchate as "an instrument of Russian international policy [and] an effective transmitter worldwide of the political interests of the Russian rulers." The view that the meeting was motivated by internal Orthodox politics was expressed by George Demacopoulos, Greek-Orthodox chairman of Orthodox Christian studies at Fordham University in New York: "This isn't benevolence. It's not a newfound desire for Christian unity. ...It is almost entirely about (Kirill) posturing and trying to present himself as the leader of Orthodoxy."

Similar views are expressed by Borys Gudziak (Ukrainian Catholic Eparchial Bishop of Paris), who states that "the two protagonists in this drama come to it bearing different legacies. Francis is the leader of a billion Catholics and is the single most respected moral authority in the world. Kirill is the head of the Russian Orthodox Church, which is still limping from a century of persecution and still looking for its moral voice in post-Soviet Russian society." Gudziak also highlighted the internal tensions in Orthodoxy, and that an independent Ukrainian Orthodox Church would greatly reduce the power of the Russian Orthodox Church. (Note: According to a 2015 article on jamestown.org, the Russian Orthodox Church "would cease to be the largest Orthodox denomination in the world" if it were "to lose all of its parishes and bishoprics in Ukraine.") He pointed out the tensions arising from the impending Pan-Orthodox council in June, the first to be held in centuries. (Note: For more on issues relating to the planned Pan-Orthodox Council, see 'At Last, A Council for the Ages?' by John Chryssavgis, US theologian and advisor to Ecumenical Patriarch Bartholomew.) In addition to this, Patriarch Kirill may face opposition from conservative groups in Russian Orthodoxy opposed to closer ties with the Catholic Church.

US Jesuit priest Robert F. Taft credits the new approach by Francis for creating the conditions needed for the meeting, opining that "Russia is coming to understand that the Catholic Church sees them as a sister church, not as someone who separated from the only real Church." The New York Times states that for Francis, "the meeting was an ecumenical and diplomatic coup that eluded his predecessors", but that he could face criticism for indirectly providing support for the Russian military intervention in Syria and Ukraine. The Associated Press report states that the meeting "cemented Francis' reputation as a risk-taking statesman who values dialogue, bridge-building and rapprochement at almost any cost" but adds that he "has also come under criticism for essentially allowing himself to be used by a Russia eager to assert itself". When asked about the possibility of being the first pope to visit Russia and China, Francis pointed to his heart and said: "China and Russia, I have them here. Pray."

According to The Economist, the meeting was a diplomatic victory for Russia's government: "The [pope's] meeting with his Russian counterpart drew Francis deep into geopolitics, and led him to condone Russia's foreign policy and critique the West's in ways that infuriated some of the Catholic church's supporters".

Major Archbishop Sviatoslav Shevchuk, of the Ukrainian Greek Catholic Church, says he was disappointed and his church members felt "betrayed by the Vatican" over the declaration's stance regarding Ukraine. Nonetheless, Shevchuk asks, "all not to rush in judging [Francis], not to remain on the reality level of those who expect only politics from this meeting and want to exploit a humble pope for their human plans at all costs. If we don't enter into the spiritual reality of the Holy Father and do not discern together with him the action of the Holy Spirit, we shall remain imprisoned by the prince of this world and his followers." The nuncio to Ukraine, Claudio Gugerotti, called for patience and indicated that the declaration was a compromise statement.

The Ukrainian Orthodox Church of the Kyivan Patriarchate also criticised the declaration; it states that the declaration ignores the opinion and position of the Ukrainian Greek Catholic Church. It also protests that the declaration had not stated that the War in Donbas was a Russian military intervention in Ukraine. In a press conference on 18 February 2016, Francis explained that questions like who started the "state of war in Ukraine" was a "historical problem".

== Reactions inside the ROC ==
According to ROC official documents, the most important goal of the Orthodox Church concerning non-Orthodox confessions is the restoration of the God-commanded Christian unity. Indifference to this task or its rejection is a sin against Jesus' command of unity. Among the duties of the Holy Synod are to: "evaluate major events in the inter-church, inter-confessional and interreligious relations," "maintain inter-confessional and interreligious relations," "coordinate the actions of" the ROC "in its efforts to reach peace and justice," and "express pastoral concern for social problems."

Nevertheless, some ROC members have questioned the orthodoxy of the Francis–Kirill meeting and ROC preparations for the 2016 Pan-Orthodox Council. (Note: The Bishops' Council passed resolutions in February 2016 on the Pan-Orthodox Council, including that the draft documents "do not violate the purity of the Orthodox faith, and do not depart from the canonical tradition of the Church.") There are "some religious nationalists" in Belarus, Moldova, and the Russian Federation who have been "stirred into action" by the Francis–Kirill meeting and "some conservative clerics and monasteries have reacted to the" meeting and joint declaration "by ceasing their public prayers for Kirill." (Note: Wil van den Bercken wrote that there are semiofficial and unofficial anti-ecumenism pamphlets "sold inside church buildings" which are not official ROC teaching but are "sometimes published 'with the blessing' of a local bishop." Although these pamphlets are based on "historical clichés and [...] lack of modern theological knowledge," according to Bercken, they "appear to have a greater impact on the way of thinking of common people than official church documents." Bercken thinks "mental barriers" against ecumenism in Russia are more "ideological and psychological" than ecclesiological or theological.) Kirill had reformed the administration of the ROC and consolidated authority in the ROC patriarch. According to Sergei Chapnin, Kirill "has no obvious enemies in the episcopate" but some "marginal figures" in the clergy are enemies. Some ROC priests have criticized Kirill and called his acts heretical. For example, Archpriest Vladislav Emelyanov said that the Francis–Kirill meeting "evokes a feeling of betrayal" and that Kirill was destroying conciliarity in the ROC by first replacing local synod bishops and then not consulting fellow bishops in such a serious matter. This was, in Emelyanov's opinion, "clear Papism." The Eparchy of Irkutsk has called Emelyanov's statement "harmful and unreasonable." Priest Alexei Morozov said that the ROC was on the verge of a split, and he encouraged ROC members to dissent in two ways: by attending "temples, where priests strictly adhere to the tenets of Christianity and do not accept heresy papacy and ecumenism" and by asking the Moscow Patriarchate to convene the Local Council of the Russian Orthodox Church to condemn what Morozov believes are heresies. According to newsru.com, the sentiments expressed by Emelyanov and Morozov are not sensationalism but exist among some members of the ROC. (Note: There is a decades long factional "struggle between openness and reform on one hand and isolation and ultra-conservatism on the other," according to Mikhail Gorelik in 1994. The religious ultraconservatives "share a common ideology" of Orthodoxy, Autocracy, and Nationality with fascist and communist political ultraconservatives. Gorelik said they "see Moslems as closer to themselves than Western Catholics." Paul Goble wrote in 2015 that according to Yevgeny Ikhlov, Kirill expresses "a kind of Orthodox Fundamentalism that not only resembles the more familiar Islamist variant but like it will encourage those who want to attack modernity in the name of traditional rural values to engage in violence.") Chapnin points out that "there exist fundamentalist groups, radically Orthodox in disposition, who condemn any rapprochement" between the ROC and the Catholic Church. Chapnin thinks fundamentalist rhetoric is "very emotional and of little substance."

The Holy Synod of the Moldovan Orthodox Church published an appeal addressed to those who omit Kirill from their public prayers.

Kirill's spokesman, Priest Alexander Volkov, said these reactions stemmed from the fact that "people have not fully understood what occurred." (Note: According to a February 2016 Russian Public Opinion Research Center (VTsIOM) opinion survey, 1-out-of-3 respondents were unaware of the Francis–Kirill meeting. Also in that survey, 62% of respondents answered that in the future, "'the two Churches should work more closely, but stay separate from each other', 8% spoke 'against cooperation or closer relations' between the two Churches, saying that they are 'incompatible and should stay such,' 10% spoke for the 'unification of the Orthodox and Catholic Churches'." Father Alexander Lucie-Smith pointed out that a February 2016 VTsIOM "survey mentions the concept of 'unification' between the two Churches. Actually, this is not on the table, and is misleading.") The deputy chairman of the Department for External Church Relations of the Moscow Patriarchate (DECR), Archimandrite Philaret Bulekov, noted "that the vast majority" of ROC members accepted the meeting and the results positively. Bulekov said that the ROC did not disregard the criticisms of the Francis–Kirill meeting by some Orthodox and answered most questions about what happened. Bulekov commented that in most cases the same people made critical remarks and "if not for this meeting, there would be other reasons for such statements."

Metropolitan Hilarion Alfeyev told Russian News Agency TASS that critics of dialogue who consider Christian disunity to be normal hold a fallacious position against Jesus' command, in John 17:20–23, that they all may be one. Alfeyev pointed out that this command had been broken and this condition was wrong and sinful. The purpose of the dialogue is reflected in the joint statement and is not intended to overcome division and differences, according to Alfayev.

Metropolitan Viktorin Kostenkov pointed out that the declaration does not contain any doctrinal agreements or concessions from Orthodoxy to Catholicism. The presence of Western saints in the Eastern Orthodox liturgical calendar, Viktorin points out, is evidence of a millennium of common doctrine. It declares a "common Christian understanding of values" together with a "desire to follow them," according to Metropolitan Mercurius Ivanov, and "does not concern dogmatic matters". "It would be a great mistake," Mercurius said, "to stop conversing with each other and to throw stones at one another."

== 2019 meeting with the Ukrainian Greek Catholic Church and renewed tensions ==
At the beginning of a two-day Vatican meeting with Ukrainian Greek-Catholic leaders on 5 July 2019, Pope Francis hinted that he supported the Church's concerns in Ukraine and called for greater humanitarian aid to Ukraine. On 4 July 2019, Pope Francis also declared that he will not meet with leaders of the Russian Orthodox Church if he were to accept an invitation to Russia. Despite having a history of good relations with Russian President Vladimir Putin, Putin, who held a "cordial" meeting with Pope Francis when this was brought up, also stated to the Pope that he would not invite the Pope to Russia without this condition.
