= Ut unum sint =

Encyclical by Pope John Paul II

Ut unum sint Latin for 'That they may be one' Encyclical of Pope John Paul II
- Signature date: 25 May 1995
- Subject: About the ecumenical commitment
- Number: 12 of 14 of the pontificate
- Text: In Latin; In English

Ut unum sint (Latin: 'That they may be one') is an encyclical on ecumenism by Pope John Paul II of 25 May 1995. It was one of 14 encyclicals he issued, and Cardinal Georges Cottier, Theologian Emeritus of the Pontifical Household, was influential in its drafting.

Like many encyclicals, this one derives its title from its "incipit" or first few words. These words are taken from the prayer of Jesus "at the hour of his Passion" in the Vulgate translation of the Gospel according to John. The document deals with the Catholic Church's relations with the Eastern Orthodox Church and other Christian ecclesial communities. It reiterates that unity of these two sui juris churches is essential, as well as further dialogue and unity with the Protestant churches. This document shows that the Catholic Church is officially committed to unity. It has become a common piece of study in ecumenical classes.

Although it builds on the Second Vatican Council's decree, Unitatis redintegratio, and pays testimony to the work of Popes Paul VI and John Paul I, Ut unum sint was the first encyclical ever devoted exclusively to the ecumenical imperative. In this groundbreaking exercise of the papal magisterium, Pope John Paul affirmed that the ecumenical commitment made at Vatican II was irreversible. He taught his fellow Catholics that the quest for Christian unity ought to be sustained both internationally and in the local churches.

== Summary ==
Paragraph 9 summarises the place of Christian unity in the Church's thinking:

To believe in Christ means to desire unity; to desire unity means to desire the Church; to desire the Church means to desire the communion of grace which corresponds to the Father's plan from all eternity. Such is the meaning of Christ's prayer: "Ut unum sint".

In paragraph 54, the Pope wrote that "the Church must breathe with her two lungs!"

In paragraph 79, five subjects are noted to be "in need of fuller study before a true consensus of faith can be achieved":

- The relationship between Sacred Scripture, as the highest authority in matters of faith, and Sacred Tradition, as indispensable to the interpretation of the Word of God;
- The Eucharist, as the Sacrament of the Body and Blood of Christ, an offering of praise to the Father, the sacrificial memorial and Real Presence of Christ and the sanctifying outpouring of the Holy Spirit;
- Ordination, as a Sacrament, to the threefold ministry of the episcopate, presbyterate and diaconate;
- The Magisterium of the Church, entrusted to the Pope and the Bishops in communion with him, understood as a responsibility and an authority exercised in the name of Christ for teaching and safeguarding the faith;
- The Virgin Mary, as Mother of God and Icon of the Church, the spiritual Mother who intercedes for Christ's disciples and for all humanity.

== Text ==
After an introduction, the encyclical's three chapters are entitled:

- Chapter 1 - The Catholic Church's Commitment to Ecumenism
- Chapter 2 - The Fruits of Dialogue
- Chapter 3 - Quanta Est Nobis Via? (How much further must we travel?)

These sections are followed by an exhortation calling on "everyone to renew their commitment to work for full and visible communion". (Paragraph 100)

The ultimate goal of the ecumenical movement is to "re-establish full visible unity among all the baptized". (Para. 77)

"It is understandable how the seriousness of the commitment to ecumenism presents a deep challenge to the Catholic faithful. The Spirit calls them to make a serious examination of conscience." (Para. 82)

== Concluding exhortation ==
"I therefore exhort my Brothers in the Episcopate to be especially mindful of this commitment. The two Codes of Canon Law include among the responsibilities of the Bishop that of promoting the unity of all Christians by supporting all activities or initiatives undertaken for this purpose, in the awareness that the Church has this obligation from the will of Christ himself. This is part of the episcopal mission and it is a duty which derives directly from fidelity to Christ, the Shepherd of the Church. Indeed all the faithful are asked by the Spirit of God to do everything possible to strengthen the bonds of communion between all Christians and to increase cooperation between Christ's followers: 'Concern for restoring unity pertains to the whole Church, faithful and clergy alike. It extends to everyone according to the potential of each'." (Para. 101)

== See also ==
- Farewell Discourse
- Unitatis redintegratio, Paul VI, 21 November 1964
- John R. Quinn
