= Satis cognitum =

Papal encyclical by Pope Leo XIII

Satis cognitum Encyclical of Pope Leo XIII
- Signature date: 29 June 1896
- Subject: On the Unity of the Church
- Number: 59 of 85 of the pontificate
- Text: In English

Satis cognitum is an encyclical of Pope Leo XIII dated 29 June 1896 on the unity of the Church, and some heresies of his time.

== Content ==
"The pontificate of Leo marked a change in how popes exercised their teaching authority. With Leo, the popes begin to offer theological treatments on important topics. It also saw a beginning the Church's participation in ecumenism.

The encyclical is an invitation to those who are without the Church to return to it. It is an affirmation of the Church's unity, and the role of the Magisterium in preserving that unity, through the threefold responsibilities of sanctifying, governing and teaching.

The document contains an extensive articulation of and apologia for Catholic ecclesiology as it relates to the Church's unity, one of the four marks of the Church according to the Niceno-Constantinopolitan Creed, which professes belief in "one, holy, catholic, and apostolic Church." The purpose was to indicate Leo's desire for unity and his interest in Catholic Ecumenism.

In the second half of the text, Pope Leo strongly defends the primacy of the Roman Pontiff as taught at the First Vatican Council as a corollary of the Church's unity, but notes

...He who made Peter the foundation of the Church also "chose, twelve, whom He called apostles" (Luke vi., 13); and just as it is necessary that the authority of Peter should be perpetuated in the Roman Pontiff, so, by the fact that the bishops succeed the Apostles, they inherit their ordinary power, and thus the episcopal order necessarily belongs to the essential constitution of the Church.

The encyclical concludes with an appeal to non-Catholic Christians and others for reunion with the Catholic Church.

== Legacy ==
Pope Paul VI refers to Satis cognitum as worthy of "special mention" within the history of papal documents dealing with the nature of the church.

== See also ==
- List of encyclicals of Pope Leo XIII
- Mortalium animos - Pius XI on the same subject
