= That they all may be one =

Phrase derived from the Gospel of John

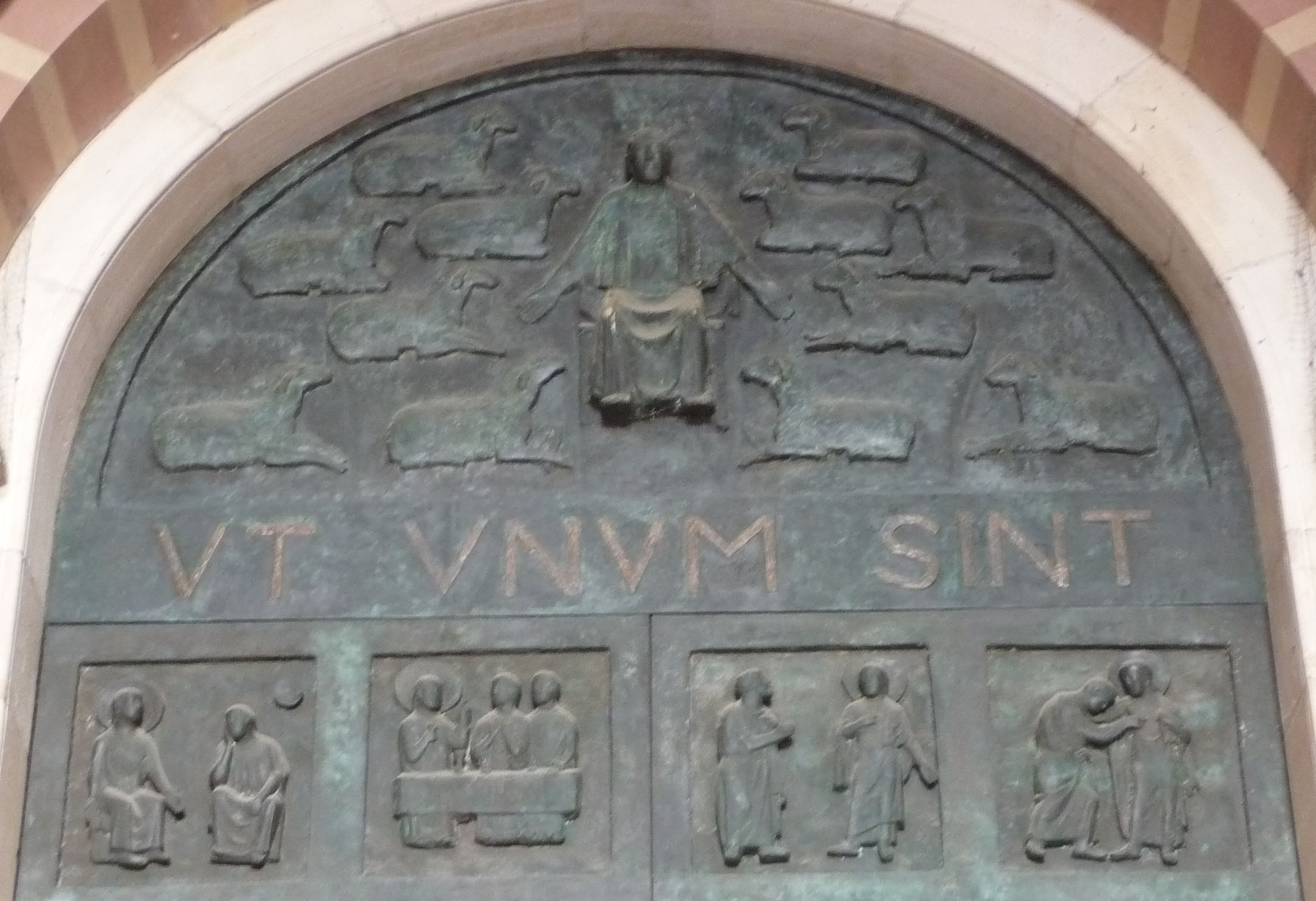
Latin version, Ut ūnum sint, Speyer Cathedral

"That they all may be one" (Greek: ἵνα πάντες ἓν ὦσιν, ina pantes hen ōsin, Latin: Ut omnes ūnum sint) is a phrase derived from a verse in the Farewell Discourse in the Gospel of John (17:21) which says:

that they may all be one. As you, Father, are in me and I am in you, may they also be in us, so that the world may believe that you have sent me.

== Significance and uses ==
The phrase forms the basis of several ecumenical movements and united and uniting denominational traditions. It is also a common sermon topic on church unity.

The phrase is the official motto of the Church of South India. The Latin version, Ut Omnes Unum Sint, is the motto of the World Student Christian Federation, the University of Mainz, the United Church of Canada and the YMCA. The United Church of Christ has the same motto except for a change in the place of one word: "That they may all be one."

The phrase is also the motto of the Graymoor Friars (the Society of the Atonement). They have used this phrase for over 100 years to describe the apostolate of the order. The Society of The Atonement started the worldwide observance of "The Church Unity Octave." The work of this Roman Catholic, Franciscan, religious order is Ecumenism.

In May 1995, Pope John Paul II published a papal encyclical under the Latin Vulgate form of this title, Ut unum sint.

It is the motto of the Wilding family, who founded Claires Court School, Maidenhead, England, and has been incorporated into the school badge since 1993, when the school acquired Maidenhead College, adding girls education to the school. It is also one of two mottoes of Spalding Grammar School in Lincolnshire, England. It is the motto of Achimota School located in Accra, Ghana and St. Louis Senior High School in Kumasi. Both Strathmore School and Strathmore University in Nairobi, Kenya. St. Paul's School in Rourkela Orissa, India also bears this motto on its Badge. It is also the motto of the Presbyterian Church of Ghana and the Grand Lodge of Ghana. Igbobi College, located in Lagos, Nigeria, also bears this motto on the school crest/badge.

== See also ==
- John 17
- Farewell Discourse
