= Pope John Paul II's relations with the Eastern Orthodox Church =

Pope John Paul II's relations with the Eastern Orthodox Church were marked by a significant improvement in relations between Roman Catholicism and Eastern Orthodoxy.

== Romania ==
In May 1999, Pope John Paul II visited Romania on the invitation from Patriarch Teoctist of the Romanian Orthodox Church. This was the first time a Pope had visited a predominantly Eastern Orthodox country since the East-West Schism in 1054, the event that separated Eastern Orthodoxy and Western Catholicism. On his arrival, the Patriarch and the President of Romania, Emil Constantinescu, greeted the Pope. The Patriarch stated, "The second millennium of Christian history began with a painful wounding of the unity of the Church; the end of this millennium has seen a real commitment to restoring Christian unity."

On 9 May, the Pope and the Patriarch each attended a worship service conducted by the other (an Orthodox Liturgy and a Catholic Mass, respectively). A crowd of hundreds of thousands of people turned up to attend the worship services, which were held in the open air. The Pope told the crowd, "I am here among you pushed only by the desire of authentic unity. Not long ago it was unthinkable that the bishop of Rome could visit his brothers and sisters in the faith who live in Romania. Today, after a long winter of suffering and persecution, we can finally exchange the kiss of peace and together praise the Lord." A large part of Romania's Orthodox population has shown itself warm to the idea of Christian reunification.

== Greece ==
During his 2001 travels, John Paul II became the first Pope to visit Greece in 1291 years.

In Athens, the Pope met with Archbishop Christodoulos, the head of the Church of Greece. After a private 30 minute meeting, the two spoke publicly. Christodoulos read a list of "13 offences" of the Roman Catholic Church against the Eastern Orthodox Church since the Great Schism, including the pillaging of Constantinople by crusaders in 1204, and bemoaned the lack of any apology from the Roman Catholic Church, saying “Until now, there has not been heard a single request for pardon” for the “maniacal crusaders of the 13th century.”

The Pope responded by saying “For the occasions past and present, when sons and daughters of the Catholic Church have sinned by action or omission against their Orthodox brothers and sisters, may the Lord grant us forgiveness,” to which Christodoulos immediately applauded. John Paul II also said that the sacking of Constantinople was a source of “profound regret” for Catholics. Later John Paul and Christodoulos met on a spot where Saint Paul had once preached to Athenian Christians. They issued a ‘common declaration’, saying “We shall do everything in our power, so that the Christian roots of Europe and its Christian soul may be preserved. … We condemn all recourse to violence, proselytism and fanaticism, in the name of religion” The two leaders then said the Lord's Prayer together, breaking an Orthodox taboo against praying with Catholics.

== Bulgaria ==
During the travels between 23 and 26 May 2002 Pope John Paul II visited Bulgaria and met with the Bulgarian Patriarch Maxim. He visited Sofia, Plovdiv and the Rila monastery and told Bulgarian President Georgi Parvanov he never believed that the country participated in organization of the 1981 assassination attempt.

== Ukraine ==
John Paul II visited another heavily Orthodox area, Ukraine on 23–27 June 2001 at the invitation of the President of Ukraine and bishops of the Ukrainian Greek Catholic Church and the Roman Catholic Church in Ukraine. This visit has had a great influence on society of Ukraine. The Pope spoke to leaders of the All-Ukrainian Council of Churches and Religious Organisations, pleading for "open, tolerant and honest dialogue".

About 200 thousand people attended the liturgies celebrated by the Pope in Kyiv, and the liturgy in Lviv gathered nearly one and a half million faithful. John Paul II stated that an end to the Great Schism was one of his fondest wishes. Healing divisions between the Catholic and Eastern Orthodox churches regarding Latin and Byzantine traditions was clearly of great personal interest. For a number of years John Paul II actively sought to facilitate dialogue and unity stating as early as 1988 in Euntes in mundum that "Europe has two lungs, it will never breathe easily until it uses both of them".

== Serbia ==
With regard to relations with the Serbian Orthodox Church, Pope John Paul II could not escape the controversy of the involvement of Croatian Catholic clergy with the Ustasa regime of World War II. In 1998, he beatified Aloysius Stepinac, the Croatian war-time Archbishop of Zagreb, a move seen negatively by those who believe that he was an active collaborator with the Ustaše fascist regime, which committed genocide against Serbs as well as Jews. On 22 June 2003 he visited Banja Luka in Bosnia and Herzegovina, a city inhabited by many Catholics before the 1992-1995 war, but since then predominantly Orthodox. He held a mass at the Petrićevac monastery, a place of considerable controversy and distress, both during World War II and during the Yugoslav wars.

== Belarus ==
Catholics in Belarus (at least 10-15% of the population) had hoped for the Pope to visit their country, a trip he himself wished to make. Resistance from the Russian Orthodox Church and Belarusian President Alexander Lukashenko, however, meant the visit never happened.

== Poland ==
Pope's relation with Polish Autocephalous Orthodox Church was marked by a series of hostilities. Pope supported Solidarity and catholic option while Polish United Workers' Party pursued russian model with Orthodox Church being marginalized but the only official state religion. Official Party's documents clearly stated that Catholicism should be embraced, extended, and extinguished in favour of Orthodox Church.

== Russia ==
The Pope had also been saying during his entire pontificate that one of his greatest dreams was to visit Russia, but this never occurred. He had made several attempts to solve the problems which arose over a period of centuries between the Roman Catholic and Russian Orthodox churches, like giving back the Kazan icon of the Mother of God in August 2004. However, the Orthodox side was not enthusiastic, making statements like: "The question of the visit of the Pope in Russia is not connected by the journalists with the problems between the Churches, which are now unreal to solve, but with giving back one of many sacred things, which were illegally stolen from Russia." (Vsevolod Chaplin).
