= Ecclesial community =

Catholic Church designation for Christian communities

In the canon law of the Roman Catholic Church, an ecclesial community (/ɪˈkliːziəl/) is a Christian religious group that does not meet the Roman Catholic definition of a "church". Although the word "ecclesial" itself means "church" or "gathering" in a political sense in Koine Greek, the Roman Catholic Church applies the term "Church" in the proper sense only to Christian communities that, according to the Roman Catholic doctrine, "have true sacraments and above all – because of the apostolic succession – the priesthood and the Eucharist".

== Definition ==
The Roman Catholic Church formally recognizes and defines as a "church" of a nature similar to its own particular churches (dioceses and autonomous or sui iuris churches) the Eastern Christian Churches separated from full communion with it, namely those of Eastern Orthodoxy, Oriental Orthodoxy, and Church of the East. It has not denied the claim of some communities of Western Christianity to meet its definition of "church" (an example is the Polish National Catholic Church). Indeed, by referring to "The Separated Churches and Ecclesial Communities in the West," the Second Vatican Council recognized the existence of some Western Churches that are not in full communion with the Holy See.

However, the Roman Catholic Church expressly excludes "those Christian communities born out of the Protestant Reformation of the sixteenth century", since, according to the Roman Catholic doctrine, these communities do not enjoy apostolic succession in the sacrament of orders, and therefore lack a constitutive element of the church. This includes the Church of England and the broader Anglican Communion, the validity of whose orders the Roman Catholic Church has declared "absolutely null and utterly void". This judgement was officially enunciated in the papal bull Apostolicae curae of 1896 by Pope Leo XIII, which confirmed all Anglican ordinations to be invalid.

However, after Cardinal Joseph Ratzinger promulgated the document Dominus Iesus in 2000, Danish Protestant ministers from the Church of Denmark replied in a public statement to the Roman Catholic Church, stating that the latest document "has a destructive effect on ecumenical relations if one church deprives another church of the right to be called a church. It is just as destructive as if one Christian denies another Christian the right to be called a Christian".
