= Mortalium animos =

1928 papal encyclical on religious unity

Mortalium animos Latin for 'The Minds of Mortals' Encyclical of Pope Pius XI
- Signature date: 6 January 1928
- Subject: On Religious Unity
- Number: 11 of 31 of the pontificate
- Text: In Latin; In English

Mortalium animos (English: The minds of mortals) is a papal encyclical promulgated in 1928 by Pope Pius XI on the subject of religious unity, condemning certain presumptions of the early ecumenical movement and confirming that the unique Church founded by Jesus Christ is the Catholic Church.

== Content ==
A movement for religious unity had been developing in liberal Protestant circles since the late 19th and early 20th centuries. Pope Leo XIII recognized this in his 1896 encyclical Satis cognitum, in which he discoursed at some length on unity as a mark of the Catholic Church. In Mortalium animos, Pius restates traditional Catholic Doctrine, that the Church enjoys a visible organic unity, which, because it is divinely constituted is divinely protected.

Pius XI rejected the hope:

that the nations, although they differ among themselves in certain religious matters, will without much difficulty come to agree as brethren in professing certain doctrines, which form as it were a common basis of the spiritual life. For which reason conventions, meetings and addresses are frequently arranged by these persons... Certainly such attempts can nowise be approved by Catholics, founded as they are on that false opinion which considers all religions to be more or less good and praiseworthy, since they all in different ways manifest and signify that sense which is inborn in us all, and by which we are led to God and to the obedient acknowledgment of His rule. Not only are those who hold this opinion in error and deceived, but also in distorting the idea of true religion they reject it, and little by little. turn aside to naturalism and atheism, as it is called; from which it clearly follows that one who supports those who hold these theories and attempt to realize them, is altogether abandoning the divinely revealed religion.

Pius understood this idea that all religions are just varying (and fallible) human expressions of a natural religious impulse or instinct. It was one of the fundamental errors of that modernism which had been so recently condemned by Pope Pius X in his encyclical Pascendi Dominici gregis. He saw the current movement towards unity "as nothing else than a Federation, composed of various communities of Christians, even though they adhere to different doctrines, which may even be incompatible one with another."

Pius stated that the Church does not permit Catholics to take part in the assemblies of non-Catholics. "To act otherwise would, in her judgment, be disloyalty to her Founder and to the truth which He has given into her care." Pius welcomed separated brethren, but stated what was and what was not possible regarding theological differences in dialogues with non-Catholics.
