= Chersonesus (disambiguation) =

Chersonesus is an ancient city near Sevastopol, Crimea.

Chersonesos or Chersonesus (Ancient Greek: χερσόνησος), the Greek word for "peninsula", may also refer to:

== Cities ==
- Cherronesos (Caria), an ancient city in Caria, now in Turkey
- Chersonesus (northern Crete), an ancient city in northern Crete

- Hersonissos, Crete, Greece, a village near the prior, adopting the ancient name

- Chersonesus (western Crete), an ancient city in western Crete
- Chersonesos (Sicily), an ancient Greek colony in Sicily, Italy
- Chersonesos (Thrace), an ancient Greek colony, also called Agora, in what is today the Gallipoli peninsula
- Chersonesus in Europa, an ancient city and bishopric in Turkish Thrace
- Chersonesus Parva, a town in ancient Egypt

== Peninsulas ==
- Taurica or Chersonesus Taurica, today known as the Crimean Peninsula
- Gallipoli, Turkey, called Chersonesus Thracica in antiquity
- Jutland Peninsula, Denmark, called Chersonesus Cimbrica in antiquity
- Malay Peninsula, Malaysia, identified with the Golden Chersonese, or the Chersonesus Aurea, in antiquity

== See also ==
- Chersonese (disambiguation)
- Chersonesos A, a shipwreck off the coast of the Crimean peninsula
- Chersonesus Cathedral, in Chersonesus, Crimea
- Russian Orthodox Diocese of Chersonesus
- Roman Catholic Diocese of Chersonesus (disambiguation)
- Roman Catholic Archdiocese of Chersonesus in Zechia
- Kherson (disambiguation)
