= Jerusalem in Christianity =

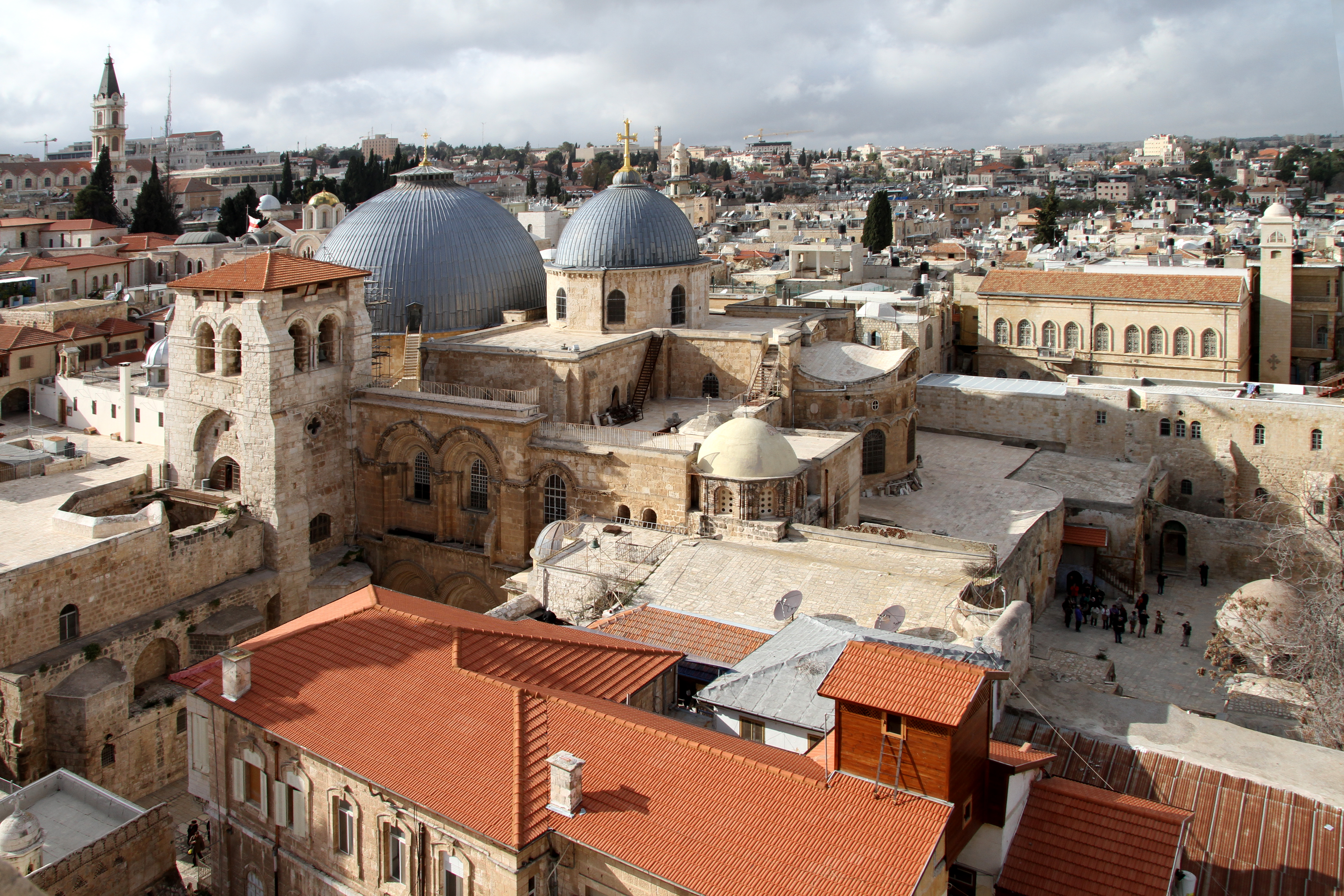
Church of the Holy Sepulchre: Jerusalem is generally considered the cradle of Christianity.

Jerusalem's role in first-century Christianity, during the ministry of Jesus and the Apostolic Age, as recorded in the New Testament, gives it great importance, both culturally and religiously, in Christianity. Jerusalem is generally considered the cradle of Christianity.

== New Testament ==
=== Life of Jesus ===
According to the New Testament, Jerusalem was the city to which Jesus was brought as a child, to be presented at the Temple (Luke 2:22) and to attend the festival of Passover (Luke 2:41). According to the gospels, Jesus Christ preached and healed in Jerusalem, especially in the courts of the Temple. The events of Pentecost in the Acts of the Apostles also took place at this location. There is also an account of the cleansing of the Temple, where Jesus Christ was expelling traders and money changers out of the sacred precincts (Mark 11:15, see also Mark 11). At the end of each of the gospels, there are accounts of the Last Supper in an "Upper Room" in Jerusalem, Jesus Christ's arrest in Gethsemane, his trial, his crucifixion at Golgotha, his emtombment nearby, his resurrection and ascension, and his prophecy to return.

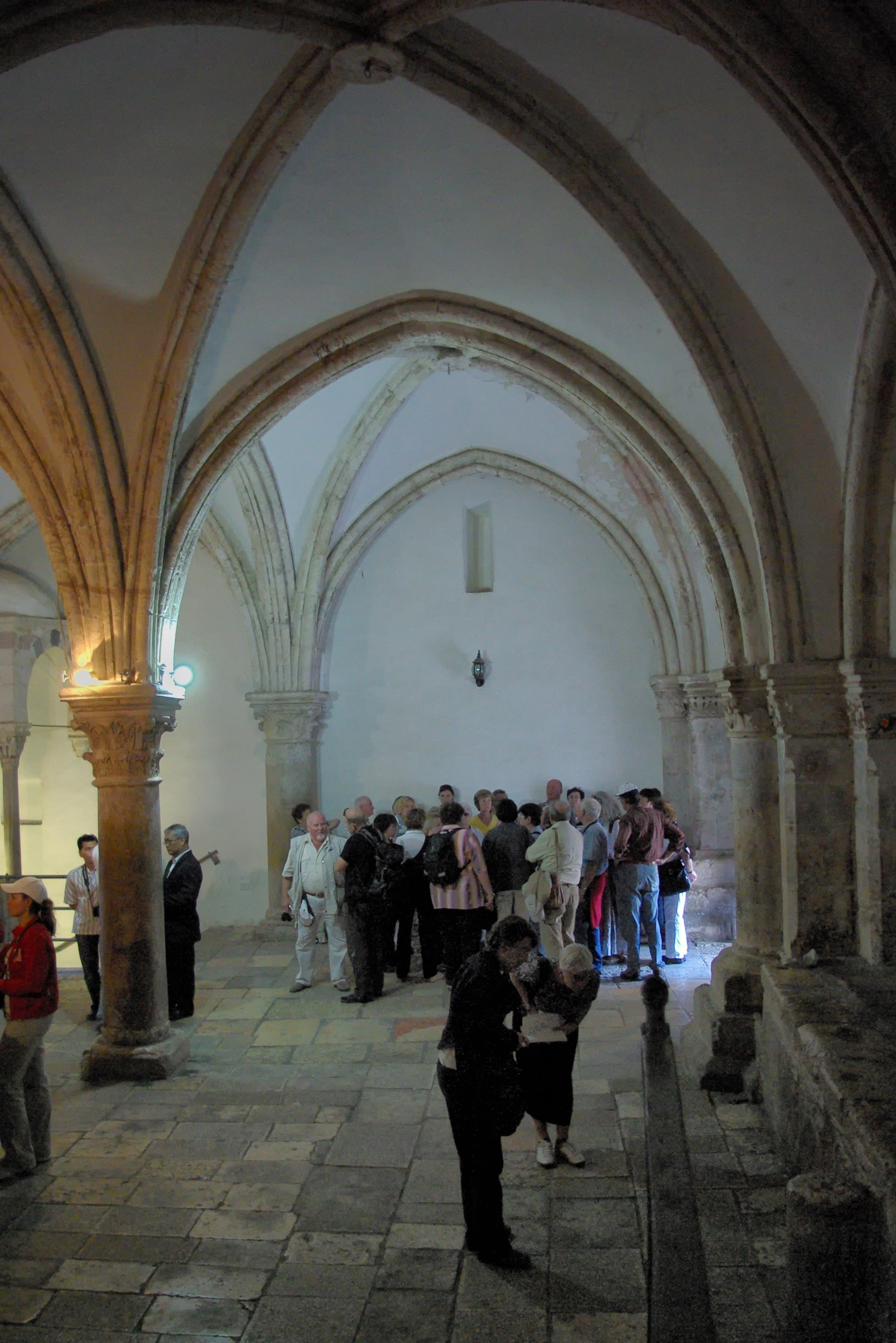
The Cenacle on Mount Zion, claimed to be the location of the Last Supper and Pentecost. Bargil Pixner claims the original Church of the Apostles is located under the current structure.

Christian tradition holds that the place of the Last Supper is the Cenacle, on the second floor of a building on Mount Zion where David's Tomb is reportedly on the first floor. Biblical archaeologist Bargil Pixner claims to have found three walls of the original structure still extant today. The place of Jesus' anguished prayer and betrayal, Gethsemane, is probably somewhere near the Church of All Nations on the Mount of Olives. Jesus' trial before Pontius Pilate may have taken place at the Antonia Fortress, to the north of the Temple area. Popularly, the exterior pavement where the trial was conducted is beneath the Convent of the Sisters of Zion. Other Christians believe that Pilate tried Jesus at Herod's Palace on Mount Zion.

The Via Dolorosa, or way of suffering, is the traditional route to Golgotha, the place of crucifixion, and is an important pilgrimage. The route ends at the Church of the Holy Sepulchre. The Holy Sepulchre is traditionally believed to be the location of Golgotha and Jesus' nearby tomb. The original church was built in 336 by Constantine I. The Garden Tomb is a popular pilgrimage site near the Damascus Gate. It was suggested by Charles George Gordon that this site, rather than the Holy Sepulchre, is the true place of Golgotha. Located next to the Church of the Holy Sepulchre is the Evangelical-Lutheran Church of the Redeemer.

Jerusalem historian Dan Mazar reported in a series of articles in the Jerusalem Christian Review on the archaeological discoveries made at this location by his grandfather, Professor Benjamin Mazar, which included the 1st-century stairs of ascent, where Jesus and his disciples preached, as well as the mikvaot used by both Jewish and Christian pilgrims. Much of this area was also uncovered by the excavations conducted by the elder Mazar.

=== Jerusalem Christ-following community ===
Following the crucifixion of Jesus, Jerusalem became the center of a community of his original Jewish followers. The Acts of the Apostles and the Pauline epistles portray James the Just, the brother of Jesus, as a leader of this early Jerusalem church. The 4th-century church fathers Eusebius and Epiphanius record a tradition that, before the destruction of Jerusalem in AD 70, the community was warned to flee to Pella in the region of the Decapolis across the Jordan River. Eusebius states that the community was warned by divine instruction. On this basis, and given that Pella is known to have been sacked by Jewish rebels during the early stages of the First Jewish–Roman War, critics have questioned the historicity of this account. It is also possible that the community was killed, taken captive, or forcibly removed during the destruction of the city. It has also been suggested that the community surrendered to the Romans, who then resettled them in Pella.

== Early Christianity ==
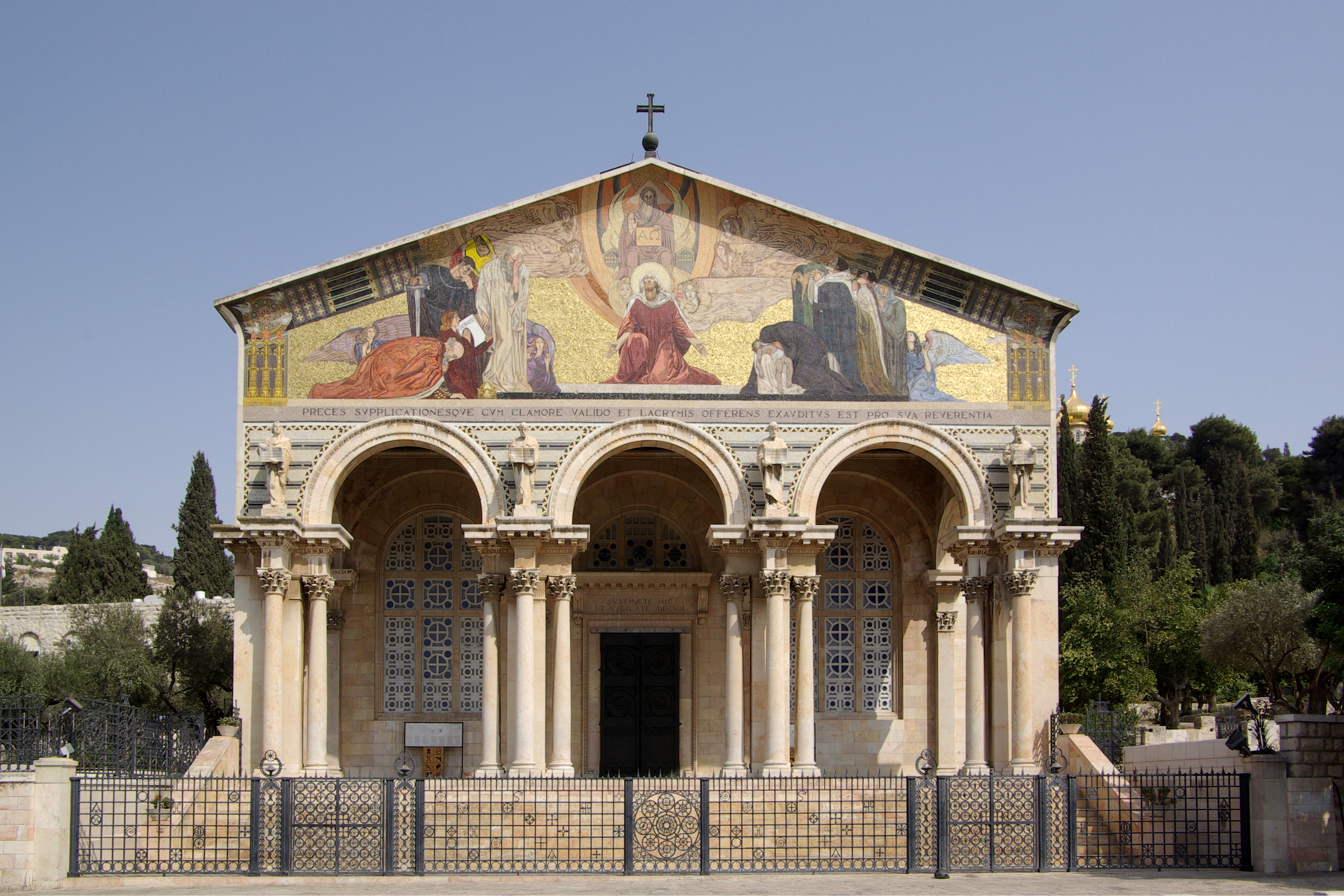
The Basilica of the Agony near the Mount of Olives

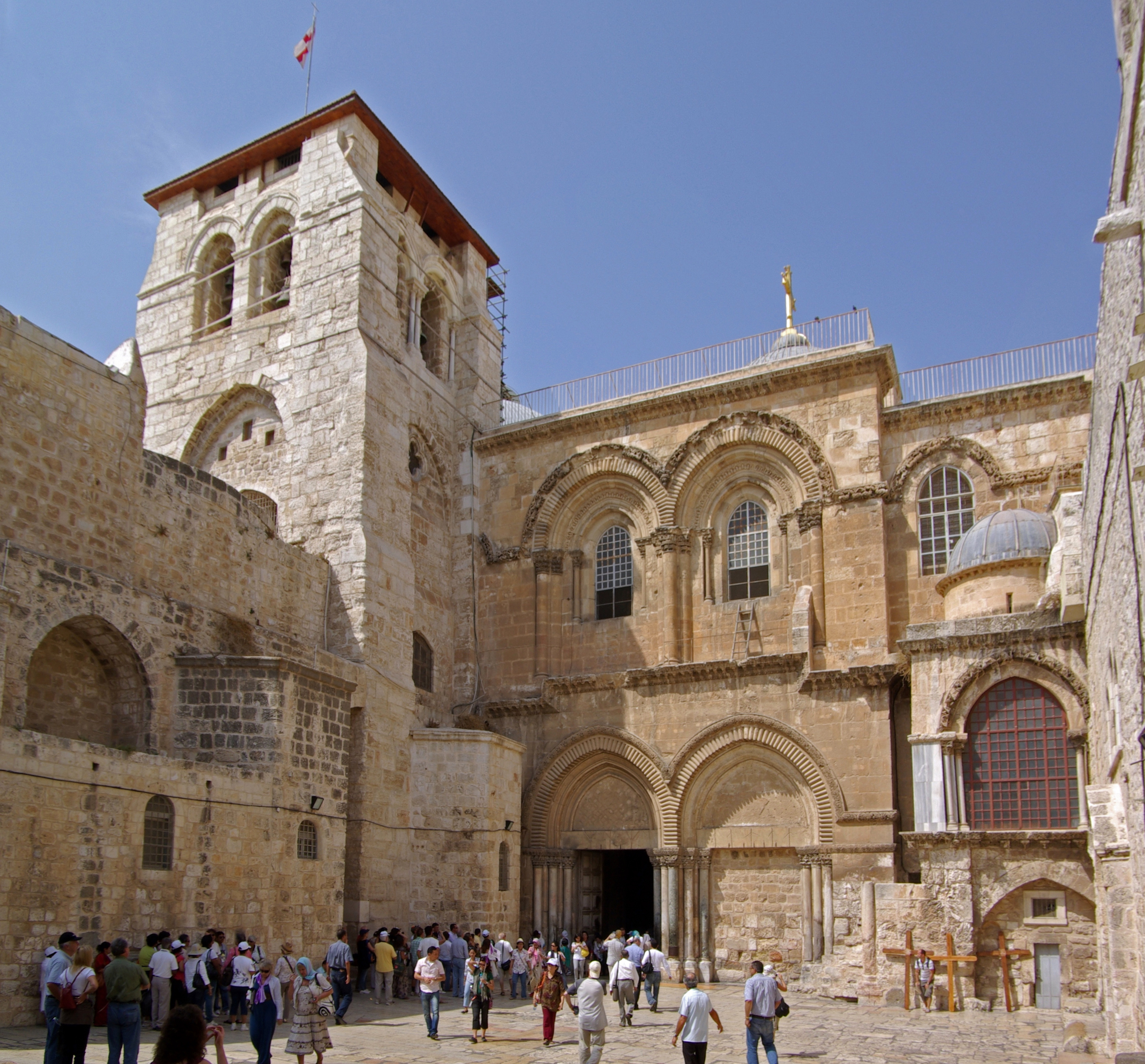
Main entrance to the Church of the Holy Sepulchre

According to Eusebius, the fourth-century bishop and historian, the displaced Jewish Christ-following community of Jerusalem returned to the city following the First Jewish Revolt; however, his account may be unreliable and appears to reflect an attempt to present an unbroken line of succession from the apostles to his own time. Approximately six decades later, a second major revolt erupted in Judea, the Bar Kokhba Revolt (132–136 AD). In its aftermath, the Romans imposed punitive measures on the Jewish population, including their exclusion from the newly founded city of Aelia Capitolina, a Roman colony built over the ruins of Jerusalem. As a result, gentile bishops were appointed under the authority of the Metropolitans of Caesarea and, ultimately, the Patriarchs of Antioch.

Origen, a prominent early Christian thinker, posited in his treatise "On the First Principles" (c. 230 CE) that Jerusalem was an entity with transcendental features:

If Israel belongs to the sphere of souls and the city of Jerusalem is in heaven, it follows that the metropolis of the cities of Israel is Jerusalem in the heavens, and likewise the whole of Judaea. If we listen to Paul's divinely inspired wisdom, whatever has been prophesied and spoken of Jerusalem is of the heavenly city and it is of the place that contains the cities of the Holy Land that we must understand what Scripture announces.

The general significance of Jerusalem to Christians outside the Holy Land entered a period of decline during the Persecution of Christians in the Roman Empire but resumed again c. 325 when Emperor Constantine I and his mother, Helena, endowed Jerusalem with churches and shrines, making it the foremost centre of Christian pilgrimage. Helena is remembered as the patron saint of archaeologists and (according to the church historian Socrates of Constantinople) claimed to have found (with the assistance of bishop Macarius of Jerusalem) the True Cross, after removing a temple to Venus that had been built over the site. Jerusalem received special recognition in Canon VII of Nicaea in 325, without yet becoming a metropolitan see.

The traditional founding date for the Brotherhood of the Holy Sepulchre (which guards the Christian holy places in the Holy Land) is 313 which corresponds with the date of the Edict of Milan which legalized Christianity in the Roman Empire.

The Council of Chalcedon in 451 raised the Bishop of Jerusalem to the rank of the patriarch, together with Rome, Constantinople, Alexandria, and Antioch. However, Byzantine politics meant that Jerusalem simply passed from the Syrian jurisdiction of Antioch to the Greek authorities in Constantinople. For centuries, Greek clergy dominated the Jerusalem church. Meanwhile, the Roman church never accepted the Pentarchy and instead claimed primacy. On the other hand, the ancient notion of the primacy of the Church of Jerusalem was preserved in several texts, like the early medieval list known as the Limits of the Five Patriarchates (Greek: Γνώσις και επίγνωσις των πατριαρχών θρόνων).

== Medieval traditions ==
=== Muslim conquest of the Levant ===
In 638, Sophronius, the Patriarch of Jerusalem, handed over the keys of the city to Caliph Umar's Muslim forces. The Muslim authorities in Jerusalem were not kind to their Christian subjects, forcing them to live a life of "discrimination, servitude, and humiliation".

=== First Crusade ===
The mistreatment of Christians would only worsen as the armies of the First Crusade approached Jerusalem. Fearing that the Eastern Christians had been conspiring with approaching crusaders, the Muslim authorities of Jerusalem massacred much of the city's Christian population, seeing the fortunate escape the city in terror. While the Crusaders hoped to protect Christian pilgrims who had been attacked and killed by the Turks, to protect the Christian holy places which had been destroyed by Caliph Al-Hakim bi-Amr Allah, and in fact, were coming in response to pleas for help from the Eastern Christian Byzantine Emperor Alexios I Komnenos, there is no evidence for any conspiracy.

On 15 July 1099, the army of the First Crusade captured Jerusalem. Most of the city's population was killed, with the exception of Eastern Christians. They were, however, exiled from the city, as their new Latin rulers believed they were conspiring with the Muslims. Jerusalem became the capital of a 'Latin Kingdom' with a Latin church and a Latin Patriarch, all under the authority of the Pope. The city's first Latin ruler, Godfrey of Bouillon, was elected in 1099. Out of humility and deference to Jesus, he refused to be called king in a city where he thought only Jesus had the right to be called king; he would only call himself Jerusalem's protector. Throughout his short reign as protector, Godfrey struggled to increase the population of Jerusalem until his death in 1100. In 1100 he was succeeded by his brother Baldwin I who, unlike Godfrey, was willing to take the title of King of Jerusalem. With Jerusalem's population dwindling Baldwin I, as early as 1115, offered the Christians of Transjordan a section of Jerusalem. These Christians were often the target of Muslim aggression and therefore promptly accepted Baldwin's proposal. In 1187, when Saladin captured the city, the Holy Sepulchre and many other churches were returned to the care of Eastern Christians.

== Early modern and modern ==
From the 17th to the 19th century, various Catholic European nations petitioned the Ottoman Empire for Catholic control of the 'holy places'. The Franciscans are the traditional Catholic custodians of the holy places. Control swung back and forth between the western and eastern churches throughout this period. Sultan Abd-ul-Mejid I (1839–1861), perhaps out of despair, published a firman that laid out in detail the exact rights and responsibility of each community at the Holy Sepulchre. This document became known as the Status Quo, and is still the basis for the complex protocol of the shrine. The Status Quo was upheld by the British Mandate and Jordan.

After the 1967 Arab-Israeli War, and the passing of the Old City into Israeli hands, the Knesset passed a law protecting the holy places. Five Christian communities currently have rights in the Holy Sepulchre: the Greek Patriarchate, Latins (Western Rite Roman Catholics), Armenians, Copts and Syriac Orthodox.

== Jerusalem as an allegory for the Church ==
In Christianity, Jerusalem is sometimes interpreted as an allegory or type for the church of Christ. There is a vast apocalyptic tradition that focuses on the heavenly Jerusalem instead of the literal and historical city of Jerusalem. This view is notably advocated in Augustine of Hippos's The City of God, a popular 5th-century philosophical opus that was written during the decline of the Roman Empire.

== See also ==
- Christian Zionism
- Christian–Jewish reconciliation
- Council of Jerusalem (1672)
- Jerusalem in Judaism
- Jerusalem in Islam
- Jesus Trail
- Limits of the Five Patriarchates
- List of Christian holy places in the Holy Land
- New Jerusalem
- Primacy of the Five Patriarchates
- Timeline of Jerusalem
