= Khersan =

Khersan may refer to:

- Khersan, Iran, a village in Iran
- Khersan, Syria, a village in Syria
- Khersan River, tributary of the Karun River in Iran

== See also ==
- Kherson (disambiguation)
