= Limits of the Five Patriarchates =

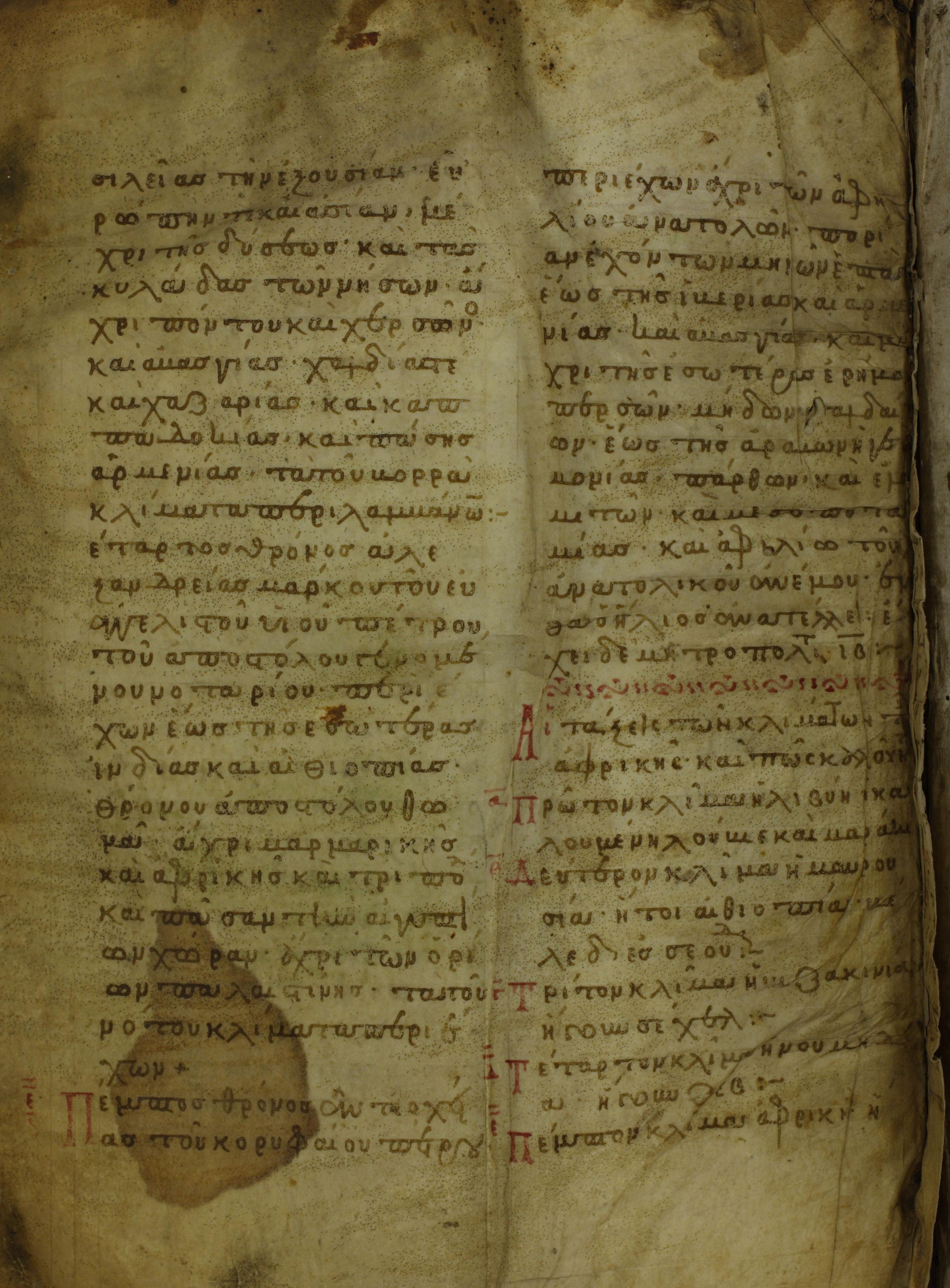
The Limits of the Five Patriarchates in minuscule 543

The Limits of the Five Patriarchates is a Greek text, describing the five patriarchates of Christianity in the Middle Ages. It is found appended to some manuscripts of the New Testament. The text's sequence and validity of patriarchates is different from the traditional Pentarchy established by ecumenical councils, with Jerusalem moved to first. The order of the other four is unchanged: Rome, Constantinople, Alexandria and Antioch.

The document probably was written in Calabria, in the 9^{th} or 10^{th} century. It is found in some manuscripts of the New Testament: 69, 211, and 543 (in 543 one page of it is lost). In minuscule 543, this document is titled "Γνώσις καὶ ἐπίγνωσις τῶν πατριαρχῶν θρόνων" (Knowledge and Cognition of the Patriarchate Sees).

== Translation ==
- The First See and Patriarchate is that of Jerusalem: James, the brother of God, apostle, eyewitness, minister of the Word, and guardian of the hidden mysteries. Its jurisdiction encompasses all Palestine and extends as far as Arabia.
- The Second See is that of Rome, founded by the Apostle Peter. Its authority stretches from Rome to the western extremities of the world: the mountains of Gaul, Spain, Illyricum, Gades, and the Pillars of Hercules, reaching the Ocean at the setting of the sun. It includes Ravenna, Lombardy, Thessalonica, the lands of the Slavs, Scythians, and Avars as far as the Danube (the ecclesiastical frontier) as well as Sardinia, Megara, Carthage, part of the Balearic Islands, and part of Sicily and Calabria.
- The Third See is that of Constantinople, founded by Saint Andreas and Saint John the Theologian and Evangelist. It possesses, most certainly, the power of the Roman Empire, encompassing Europe, western Asia, and the Cycladic islands, extending to Pontus, Cherson, Chaldea under the Abbasids, the Khazars, Cappadocia, Armenia, and the boundless northern regions.
- The Fourth See is that of Alexandria, founded by Mark the Apostle and Evangelist, disciple of Peter. Its jurisdiction extends over Egypt, Ethiopia, Tripolitania, and the regions of Africa up to the borders of Palestine and the southern lands.
- The Fifth See is that of Antioch, also of Peter. Its territory reaches eastward over a journey of seven months, extending through Georgia, Armenia, and Atropatene, into the interior deserts of the Persians, Medes, and Chaldeans, as far as the Arab dominions, Parthia, Mesopotamia, and Elam, toward the lands of the rising sun.

== See also ==
- Pentarchy
- Ecclesiology
- Primacy of Peter
