= Sinop D =

Ancient Black Sea shipwreck

Sinop D is an ancient Black Sea shipwreck located to the east of Sinop, Turkey. The ship was discovered by a team led by Robert Ballard with Dan Davis in 2000. The team discovered the well-preserved wreck at a 320 m depth, in the Black Sea's deep anoxic waters. The vessel's entire hull and cargo are intact, buried in sediments. Its deck structures are also intact, including a mast, and rope attached on the top, rising some 11 m into the water column. Radiocarbon dating of wood from the wreck provides a date of 410–520 CE. However, the wreck could not be completely salvaged as the mud and sediment encasing the wreck were hard to remove without possibly causing damage to the already fragile ship.

== Excavations ==
In 2000, Ballard and his team conducted an expedition that focused on the exploration of the sea bed about 15–30 km west of Sinop, and an additional deep-water survey east and north of the peninsula. Their project had several goals. They sought to discover whether human habitation sites could be identified on the ancient submerged landscape, they examined the sea bed for shipwrecks (where they found Sinop A–D), to test the hypothesis that the anoxic waters below 200 m would protect shipwrecks from the expected biological attacks on organic components, and to seek data about an ancient trade route between Sinop and Crimea indicated by terrestrial archaeological remains.

The wreck found provided the team with vast information about both the technological changes and trade that occurred in the Black Sea during a period of political, social and economic transition through their study of the ship's construction techniques. Studies show that long-distance trading had developed in Sinop as early as 4500 BCE. Sea trading on the Black Sea was most intense during the period of late antiquity, between the 2nd and 7th centuries CE. Sinop D provides direct evidence for Black Sea maritime trade so well attested by the distribution of ceramics on land.

Sinop D provided Ballard and his team with an unprecedented opportunity to document hull construction during a time of transition. When observing the sonar signature of Sinop D, a long, slender upright feature on the sea-bed transformed itself into a wooden mast. Elements rarely present on shallower shipwreck sites are beautifully preserved 200 m below the surface. There are currently few indications of how the planks of Sinop D are held together, as the bulk of the ship remains buried in sediments. There are no mortise and tenon fastenings, and no sewing. Sinop D was originally thought to be one of the earliest lateen-rigged ships available to be studied by archaeologists. However, a 2007 expedition to the site identified what is now believed to be a mast for an artemon, which would suggest a different type of vessel. Some photos are available online. New technology is currently in development that will allow more thorough and preserving excavations to take place.

== Documentaries ==
A small segment regarding the excavations done on Sinop D is now found on National Geographic's Drain the Oceans. Here, Dan Davis, along with other marine archaeologists and classists look at the influence on the Black Sea in relation to Roman ships from the times of the Ancient Romans.

== See also ==
- Chersonesos A
- Robert Ballard
- List of surviving ancient ships
