= Minuscule 543 =

Greek manuscript of the New Testament

- New Testament manuscript
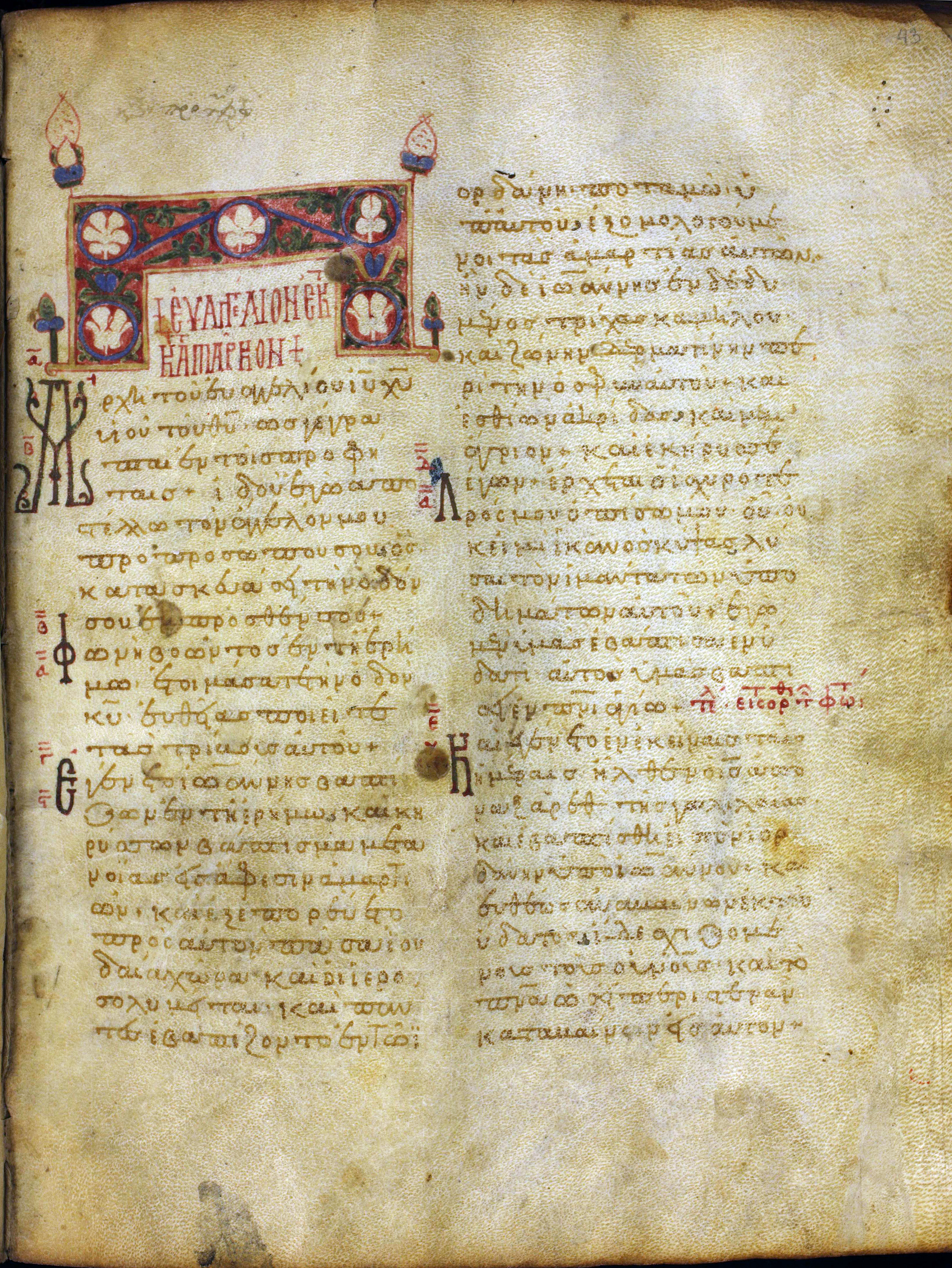
- The first page of the Gospel of Mark
- Text: Gospels †
- Date: 12th century
- Script: Greek
- Now at: University of Michigan
- Size: 28 cm by 23 cm
- Type: Caesarean text-type
- Category: III
- Hand: minute
- Note: member of ƒ^{13}

Minuscule 543 is a Greek minuscule manuscript of the New Testament, written on parchment. It is designated by the siglum 543 in the Gregory-Aland numbering of New Testament manuscripts, ε 257 in von Soden's numbering of New Testament manuscripts, and labelled as 556 by biblical scholar and textual critic F. H. A. Scrivener. Using the study of comparative handwriting styles (palaeography), it has been assigned to the 12th century.

The manuscript contains the text of the four Gospels, with some gaps and some unusual grammar forms and numerous errors. It is a member of Family 13 (ƒ^{13}).

== Description ==
=== Contents ===
The manuscript is a codex (precursor to the modern book format), containing the text of the four Gospels on 184 thick parchment leaves (size 28 cm by 23 cm), with several gaps: Matthew 12:11-13:10; Mark 8:4-28; Luke 15:20-16:9; John 2:22-4:6; 4:52-5:43; 11:21-47. One leaf in the Gospel of John was misplaced after it likely fell out and put back in the wrong place. The parchment is coarse and yellowed by age.

The text of the codex is written two columns per page, 27-30 lines per page, 17 letters per line, in a minute hand using brown ink. The same scribe copied all four Gospels. Breathings (utilised to designate vowel emphasis) and accents (used to indicate voiced pitch changes) are employed in regular form, but in some sort of system. Iota subscript (a small Greek letter ι (iota) written underneath vowels in certain words to indicate a change of sound) is not used, though iota adscriptum (where the ι is written as part of the main text with the same function as the iota subscript) occurs very often, especially in the Gospel of Mark.

The titles to the Gospels of Matthew and Mark run: Ευαγγέλιον εκ του κατά Ματθαίου (Μάρκου) (The Gospel of that according to Matthew (Mark)). (Note: The headings of the Gospels also appear this way in Minuscule 69, 178, and 668.) The titles to Luke and John are the usual: Ευαγγέλιον κατά Λουκάν (Ιωάννην) (The Gospel according to Luke (John)).

The lists of the chapters (known as κεφαλαια / kephalaia) are placed before the Gospels of Mark, Luke, and John, however those for Matthew are missing, likey due to the initial leaves of the manuscript being lost. The numbers of the κεφαλαια are usually given at the top of the columns, but sometimes below, with their titles (known as τιτλοι / titloi) written in red ink at the top of the pages. There is a division according to the Ammonian Sections, with references to the Eusebian Canons (both early systems of dividing the four Gospels into different sections). It contains lectionary markings (to indicate what verse was to be read on a specific day in the churches yearly calendar) written either within the main text, or in the margin, Synaxarion (a list of saint's days), Menologion (a list of readings to be read each calendar month), subscriptions, lists of how many phrases (known as ρηματα / rhemata) are used in each gospel, and how many lines (known as στιχοι / stichoi) are written in each gospel. As the list of κεφαλαια to Matthew is missing, the Gospel of Matthew begins on the first page of the codex. It has additional non-biblical material: The Limits of the Five Patriarchates (as in codices 69 and 211), of which one page is lost.

=== Nomina sacra and OT quotations ===
The nomina sacra (names/titles considered sacred in Christianity) are contracted in the usual way, but there are a number of words which the scribe failed to abbreviate. In some of the cases where nomina sacra are uncontracted, they have the heavy bar signifying contraction. υιος (son) is contracted only once (John 4:47).

For the other nomina sacra it has some unusual ones, examples of which are: σ̅τ̅ω̅σ̅ο̅ν̅ for σταυρωσον (crucify); σ̅τ̅ρ̅ω̅θ̅η̅ for σταυρωθη (to be crucified); and παρ^{θ}νος for παρθένος (virgin). Quotations from the Old Testament are indicated in the left margin by a rubricated letter or sign.

=== Errors ===
According to biblical scholar Jacob Geerlings, most of the misspellings have been corrected. Sometimes a stroke of the pen indicates an error, perhaps to be corrected later. Some corrections seem to be written by the first hand (e.g. Matthew 4:10; 5:19) others plainly by a second hand (Matthew 6; Luke 3; 10:35). The apostrophe is used even when not required, especially in εξ', and ουκ'.

According tο Scrivener, movable nu occurs 416 times especially with words ειπεν, εστιν. In Matthew 12:7; Luke 8:10; John 5:46; 7:7; 8:27 there is a hiatus for lack of it. The error of iotacism occurs 358 times: ει for ι (16 occurrences), ι for ει (35), ο for ω (40), ω for ο (33), αι for ε (13), ε for αι (31), ει for η (23), η for ει (19), η for ι (11), ι for η (7), ε for η (11), η for ε (2), οι for ι (3), ω for ου (20), η for υ (3), υ for η (5), υ for οι (1), υ for ει (1), η for οι (1), οι for η (1), ι for υ (1), οι for ει (2).

There are many errors by homoeoteleuton, where words/phrases are skipped over when the words/phrase following ends with the same letters (Mark 2:18; 4:24; 12:26; 14:70; 15:14; Luke 12:22.47; 13:28.29; John 4:14). There are some unusual words forms, such as the following: ανεπεσαν, ειπαν, εθεωρων, εμελλεν, εμπροσθε, εσπλαγχνισθη, ιδαμεν, ιδεν, σαρκαν, συνετιθεντο.

== Text ==
The Greek text of the codex has been considered a representative of the Caesarean text-type. It belongs to the textual family ƒ^{13}, known also as the Ferrar Group/Family. The handwriting and the menology show the manuscript is a close member of the group. According to biblical scholars and textual critics Kurt and Barbara Aland, it agrees with the Byzantine standard text 151 times, and 72 times with the Byzantine when it has the same reading as the original text. It agrees 31 times with the original text against the Byzantine. It has 57 independent or distinctive readings. It is currently placed in Category III of Kurt Aland's Greek Manuscript classification system. Category III manuscripts are described as having "a small but not a negligible proportion of early readings, with a considerable encroachment of [Byzantine] readings, and significant readings from other sources as yet unidentified."

According to the Claremont Profile Method (a specific analysis of teextual data), it represents the textual ƒ^{13} in Luke 1, Luke 10, and Luke 20, as a core member. The Pericope Adulterae follows Luke 21:38, as in other manuscripts of the Ferrar Family.

Textual Variants (short list)

The words before the square bracket are the readings of the Textus Receptus; after the square bracket are the variant readings of the codex.

- Matthew 5:48 — εν τοις ουρανοις (in the heavens) ] ο̅υ̅ν̅ι̅ο̅ς̅ (heavens)
- Matthew 7:2 — απο (from) ] εκ (from)
- Matthew 8:8 — ικανος (sufficient) ] αξιος (worthy)
- Matthew 8:26 — τοις ανεμοις (winds) ] τω ανεμω (wind)
- Matthew 11:5 — και νεκροι εγειρονται και πτωχοι ευαγγελιζονται (and the dead are raised up and the poor have the gospel preached to them) ] και πτωχοι ευαγγελιζονται και νεκροι εγειρονται (and the poor have the gospel preached to them and the dead are raised up)
- Matthew 26:39 — (text of Luke 22:43-44 appears here) ] ωφθη δε αυτω αγγελος απο του ο̅υ̅ν̅ο̅υ̅ ενισχυσον αυτον και γενομενος εν αγωνια εκτενεστερον προσηυχετο εγενετο δε ο ιδρος αυτου ωσει θρομβη αθματος καταβαινοντες επι την γην (An angel from heaven appeared to him, empowering him. And being in agony he prayed more earnestly; and his sweat became like great drops of blood falling down to the ground.)
- Mark 1:10 — ἀπὸ (from) ] ἐκ (from)
- Mark 1:10 — ἐκ (from) ] εἰς (to)

== History ==
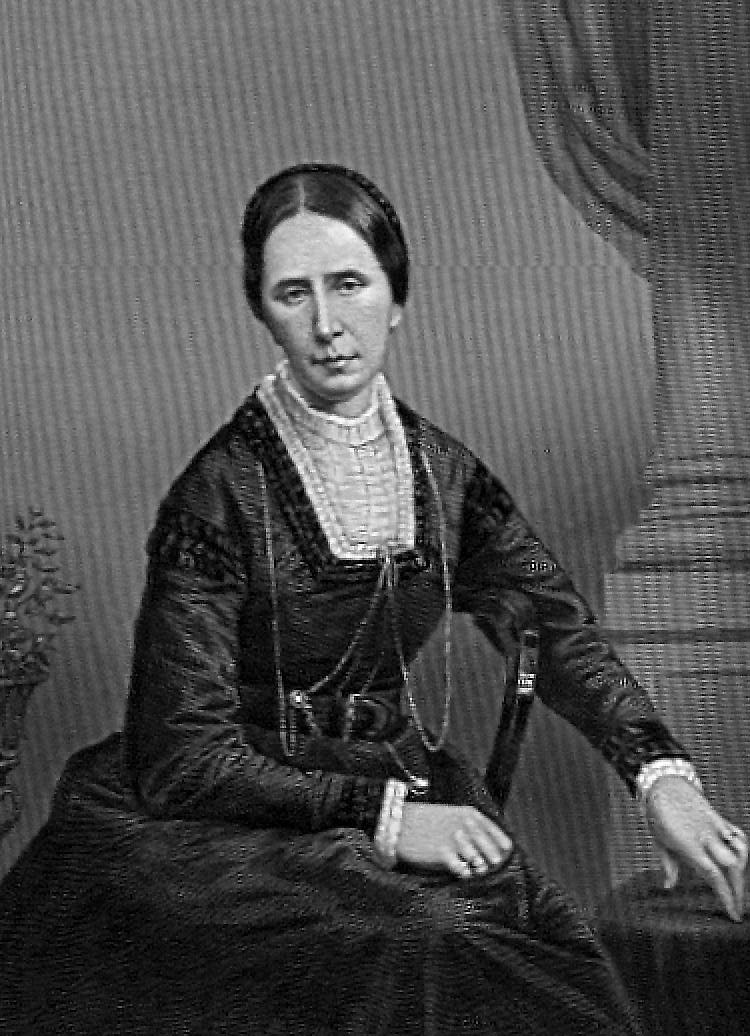
The Lady Burdett-Coutts

Concerning the history of the manuscript, nothing is known until the year 1864, when it was in the possession of a dealer at Janina in Epeiros. It was then purchased from him by a representative of Baroness Burdett-Coutts (1814–1906), a philanthropist, together with other Greek manuscripts (among them codices 532-546). They were transported to England in 1870–1871.

The manuscript was presented by Burdett-Coutts to Sir Roger Cholmely's School, and was housed at the Highgate (Burdett-Coutts III. 5), in London. In 1922 it was acquired for the University of Michigan.

Biblical scholar James R. Harris pointed out that the menology of the Ferrar group contains saints which appear to be peculiar to Calabria or Sicily. Abbe Martin had previously stated that certain palaeographical traits to be observed in these manuscripts were characteristic of Calabrian scriptoria.

Scrivener observed a close textual affinity to the Ferrar group and announced in 1883 in the third edition of "Plain Introduction" as pertaining to the same class. Scrivener collated its text and it was edited posthumously in 1893. This collation was not wholly accurate and Jacob Geerlings, from the University of Utah, gave a new and more accurate collation in 1932.

The manuscript is currently dated by the INTF to the 12th century. It is presently housed at the University of Michigan (shelf number Ms. 15) in Ann Arbor.

== Gallery ==
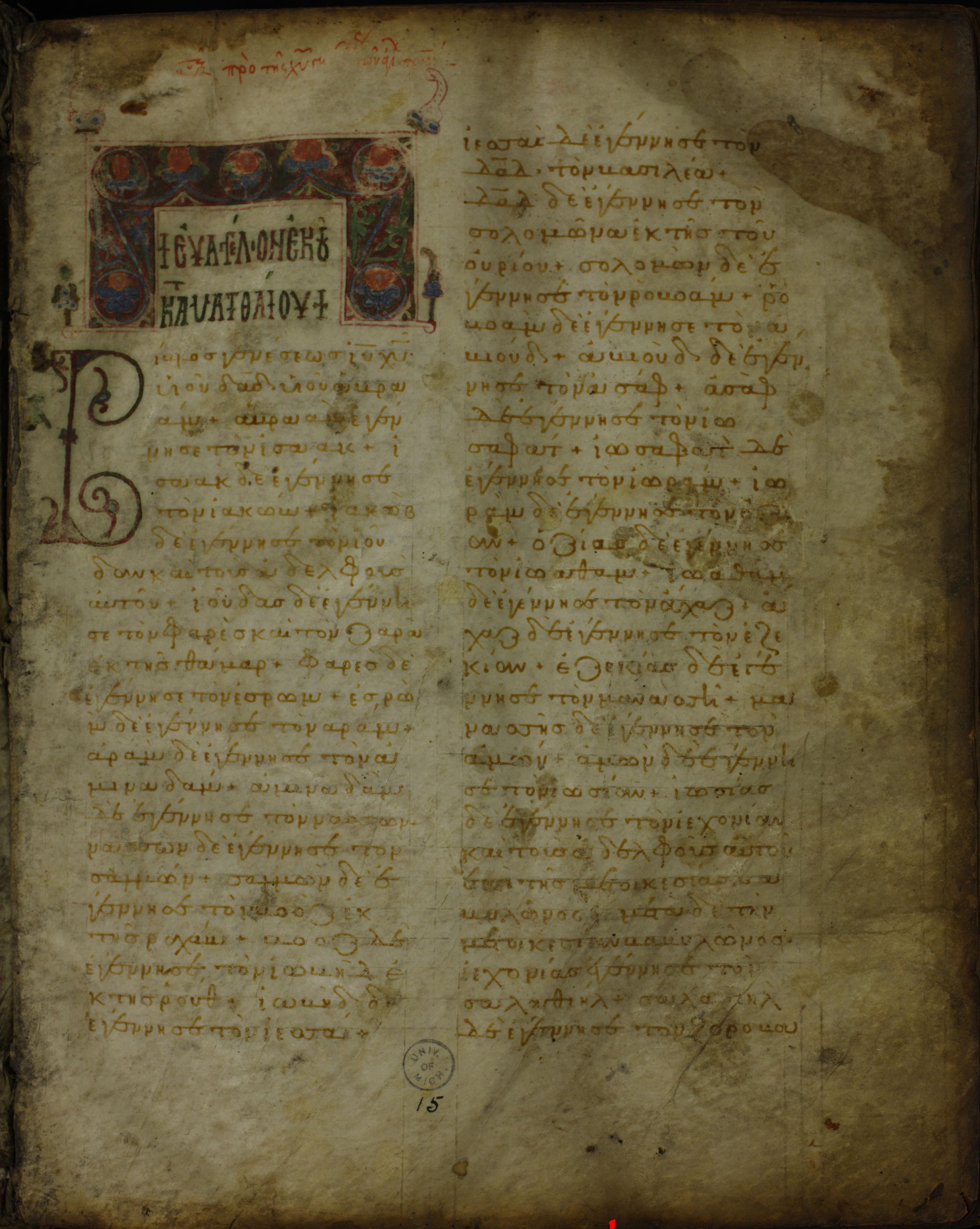
The first page of the Gospel of Matthew

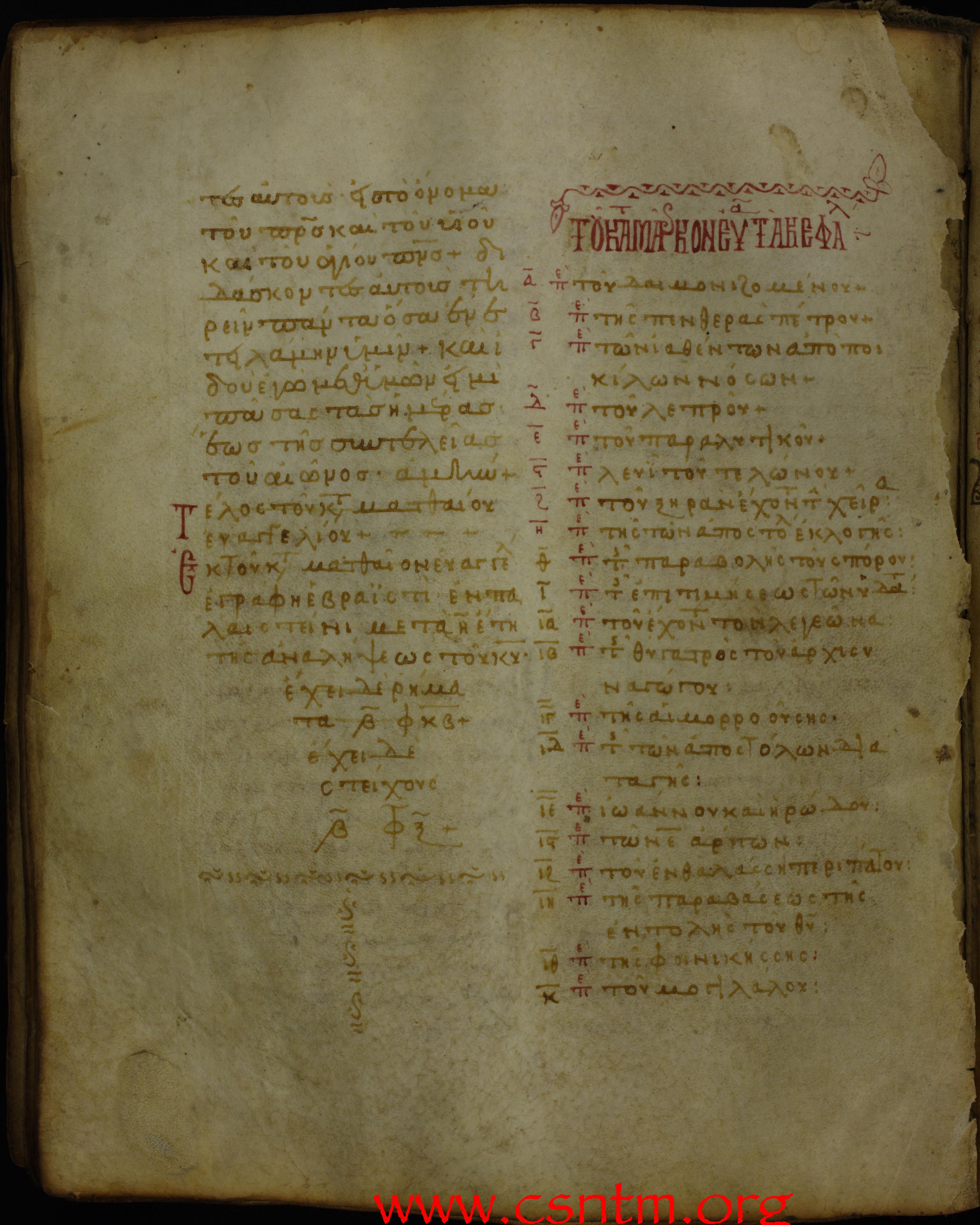
Tables of the κεφαλαια to Mark (right column)

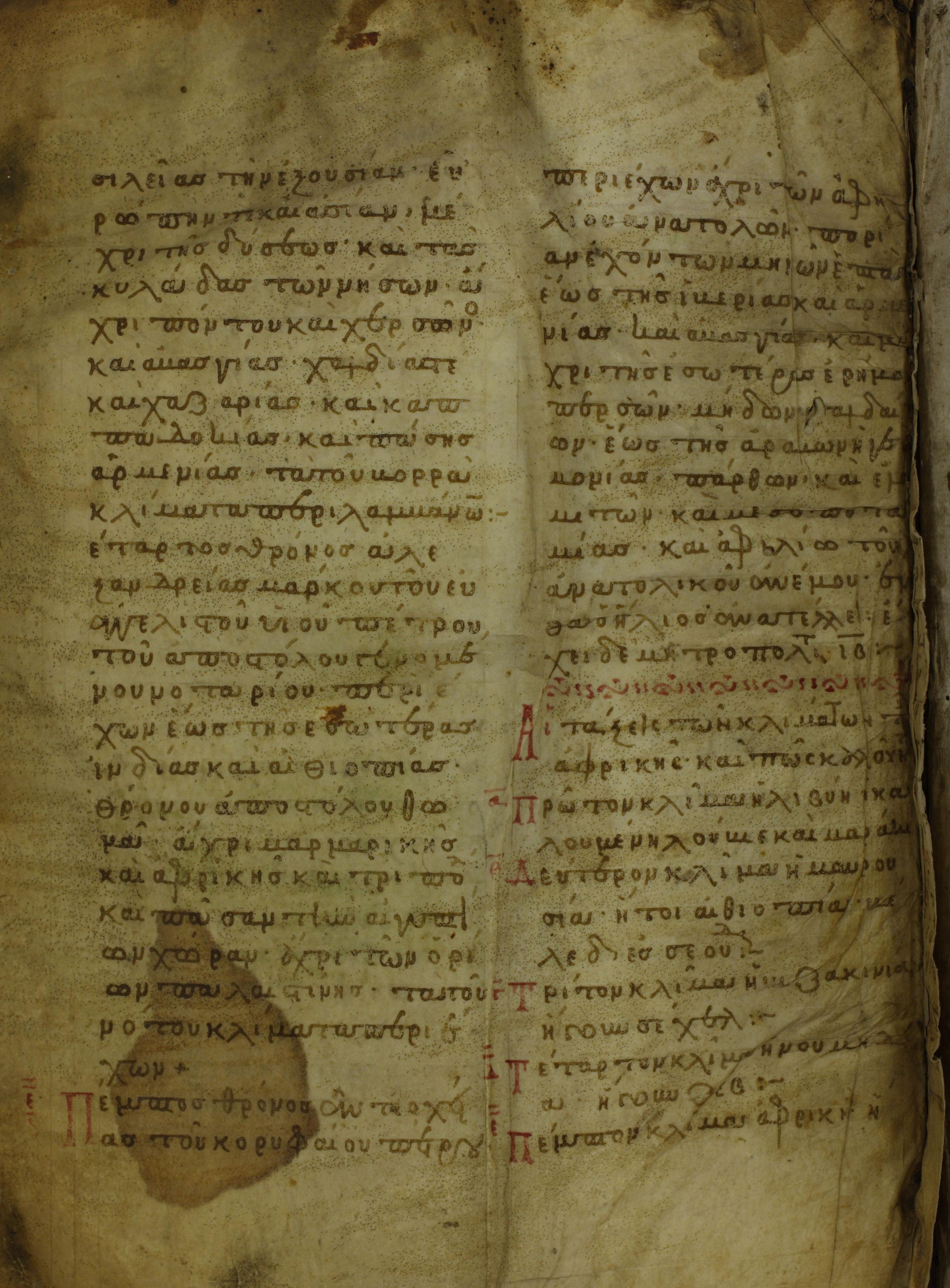
Non-biblical additional material - the Limits of the Five Patriarchates

== See also ==
- Minuscule 544
- Minuscule 542
- List of New Testament minuscules
- Biblical manuscript
- Textual criticism
