= Chersonese =

Chersonese (/ˈkɜːrsəniːs/) is a name that was given to several different places in ancient times. The word is derived from the Greek term for "peninsula", χερσόνησος chersonēsos, from χέρσος chersos ("dry land") + νῆσος nēsos (island).

It was applied to a number of peninsulas in the ancient world. These included:

- Chersonesos Taurica, ancient Greek colony in the land of Tauri (today, on the outskirts of Sevastopol, Crimea); the name was also used to refer to the entire Crimean peninsula.
- Thracian Chersonese ancient Greek colony in the land of Thracians (today in Gallipoli); known in Latin as Chersonesus Thracica, the ancient name for the Gallipoli Peninsula.
- Chersonesus Aurea, or Golden Chersonese, the ancient name for the Malay Peninsula, described by Ptolemy circa 150 AD.
- Chersonesus Cimbrica or Cimbrian Chersonese, the ancient name for Jutland.
- Syrian Chersonese, referred to by Plutarch, believed to have been situated in a bend of the Orontes River in the neighbourhood of Antioch.
- In addition, in the 1632 Charter of Maryland, King Charles I of England referred to the Delmarva Peninsula as the "Chersonese."

== See also ==
- Chersonesus (disambiguation)
