= Chersonesos A =

Early Medieval Black Sea shipwreck

Chersonesos A is an early Medieval Black Sea shipwreck located in suboxic waters off the coast of Crimean peninsula. The ship is believed to be a Byzantine trading vessel.

== See also ==
- Sinop D
- Robert Ballard
- List of surviving ancient ships
