= Kherson Province =

Kherson Province may refer to:

- Kherson Oblast, subdivision of Ukraine
- Kherson Governorate, subdivision of the Russian Empire

== See also ==
- Kherson (disambiguation)
