= Thomas Hayne (theologian) =

English schoolmaster and theologian

Thomas Hayne (1582–1645) was an English schoolmaster and theologian.

== Life ==
The son of Robert Hayne of Thrussington, Leicestershire, he matriculated from Lincoln College, Oxford, on 12 October 1599. He was admitted B.A. on 23 January 1605, was appointed second under-master of Merchant Taylors' School, London, in the same year, became usher at Christ's Hospital in 1608, and commenced M.A. in 1612. He died on 27 July 1645, and was buried in Christ Church, London, where a monument, destroyed in the Great Fire of London, was erected to his memory. Anthony Wood describes him as a scholar particularly respected by John Selden.

== Legacy ==
By will dated 20 September 1640 he bequeathed his books to the library at Leicester, with the exception of a few which he left to the library at Westminster. He also gave £400, to buy land or houses for the maintenance of a schoolmaster at Thrussington to teach ten poor children, and bequeathed £42 yearly for the maintenance of two scholars in Lincoln College, Oxford. Other charitable bequests are included in his will.

Other gifts during his lifetime were towards the library of Sion College; and of Minuscule 69, a significant manuscript, to the Leicester library in 1640.

== Works ==
His works are:

- 'Linguarum cognatio, seu de Linguis in genere et de Variorum Lingarum Harmoniii Dissertatio,' London. 1639. Reprinted in Thomas Crenius's 'Analecta Philologico-Critico-Historica,' Amsterdam, 1699.
- 'Grammaticae Latine Compendium,' London, 1640.
- 'The equal wayes of God: for rectifying the unequal wayes of man. Briefly and clearly drawn from the sacred Scriptures. . . . Second edition, revised and . . . enlarged,' London, 1640.
- 'The Life and Death of Dr. Martin Luther, presented in an English dresse, out of the learned and laborious work of Melchior Adam,' London, 1641.
- 'Of the Article of our Creed: Christ descended to Hades, or ad Inferos' (anon.), London, 1642.
- 'Christs Kingdome on Earth, opened according to the Scriptures. Herein is examined what Mr. Th. Brightman, Dr. J. Alstede, Mr. I. Mede, Mr. H. Archer, The Glympse of Sions Glory, and such as concurred in opinion with them, hold concerning the thousand years of the Saints Reign with Christ, and of Satans binding,' London, 1645.

Hayne also published a 'General view of the Holy Scriptures; or the Times, Places, and Persons of Holy Scripture,' 2nd edit., much enlarged, London, 1640. The first edition of this anonymous book was called 'Times, Places, & Persons of the holie Scriptures. Otherwise entituled, The General View of the Holy Scriptures' London, 1607.
