= Kerson =

Kerson may refer to:

- Chris Kerson, American actor
- Kerson Hadley (born 1989), Micronesian swimmer
- Kerson Huang (1928–2016), Chinese-American theoretical physicist and translator
- Kerson Leong (born 1997), Canadian violinist

== See also ==
- Kherson (disambiguation)
