= Kherson (disambiguation) =

Kherson (Ukrainian: Херсо́н) is a city in Ukraine, by the Black Sea.

Kherson or Cherson may also refer to:

== Places ==
- Chersonesus (also: Khersonesos, Kherson), an Ancient Greek colony in Crimea
- Cherson (theme), Byzantine theme (military-civilian province) located in the southern Crimea, headquartered at Cherson
- Kherson International Airport, Kherson, Ukraine
- Kherson Province (disambiguation):
  - Kherson Governorate (Government of Kherson), Novorossiya, Russian Empire
  - Kherson Oblast, Ukraine; a province by the Black Sea
- Kherson Raion, Kherson Oblast, Ukraine; a district by the Black Sea
- Kherson Shipyard, Port of Kherson, Kherson, Ukraine
- Port of Kherson, Kherson, Ukraine

== Other uses ==
- Kherson oat, a strain of spring oats
- "Kherson", fictional call name of the raccoon of Kherson, stolen by a Crimean zoo owner during the Russian military retreat
- Roman Catholic Diocese of Cherson
- Roman Catholic Archdiocese of Chersonesus in Zechia
- 2701 Cherson, minor planet

== See also ==
- Kerson (disambiguation)
- Khersan (disambiguation)
- Chersonesus (disambiguation)
- Cherso
