= Pentarchy =

Roman model of church organization

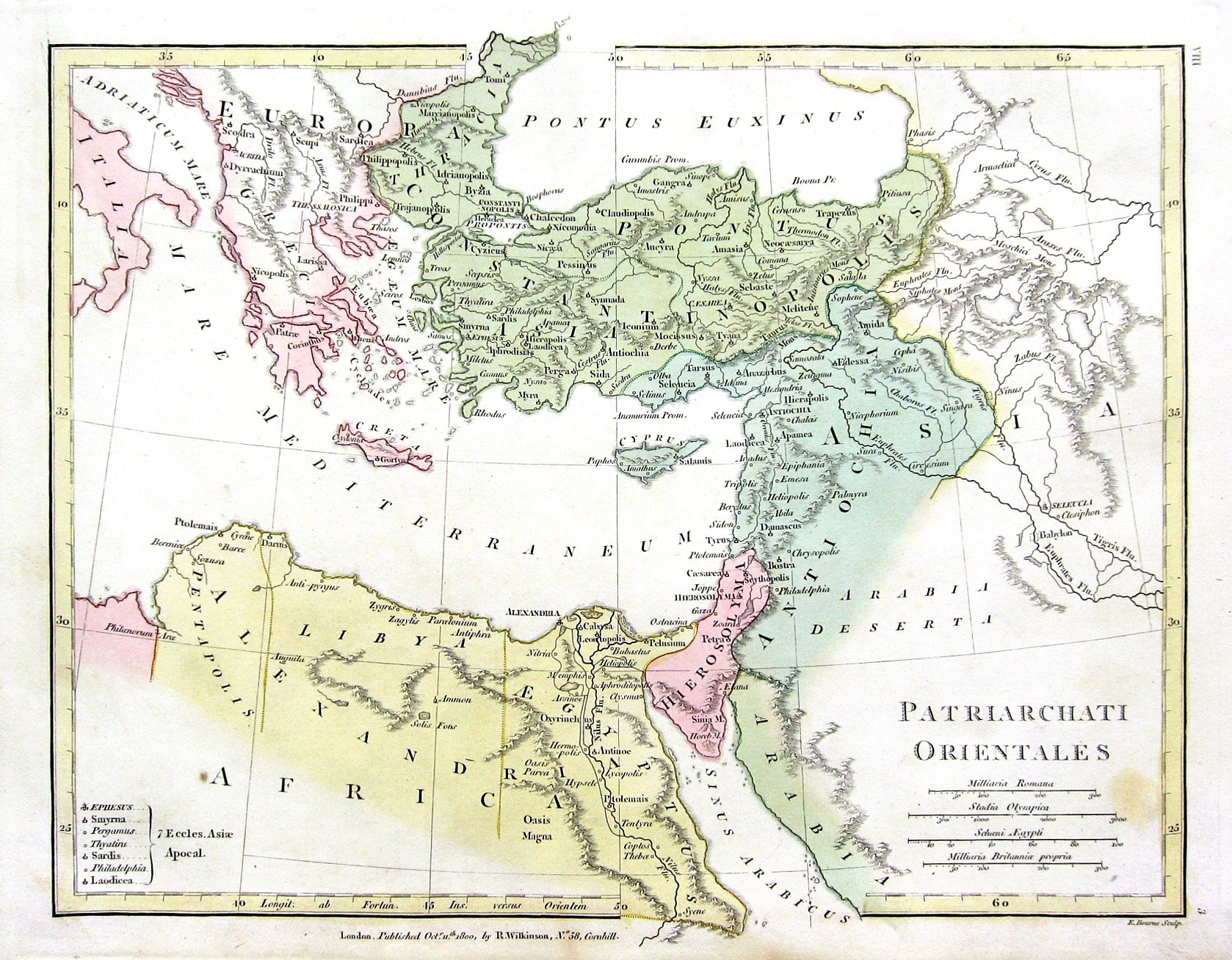
Map of the four Eastern Churches in the Pentarchy, c. 500 AD. In this version, almost all of the Balkans, including modern Greece and Crete, is under the jurisdiction of the Holy See of Rome. Emperor Leo III moved the border of the Patriarchate of Constantinople westward and northward, in the 8th century.

Pentarchy (from Ancient Greek Πενταρχία (Pentarchía), from πέντε (pénte) 'five' and ἄρχειν (archein) 'to rule') was a model of Church organization formulated in the laws of Emperor Justinian I (r. 527–565) of the Roman Empire. In this model, the Christian Church is governed by the heads (patriarchs) of the five major episcopal sees of the Roman Empire: Rome, Constantinople, Alexandria, Antioch and Jerusalem.

The idea came about because of the political and ecclesiastical prominence of these five sees, but the concept of their universal and exclusive authority was attached to earlier Hellenistic-Christian ideas of administration. The pentarchy was first legally expressed in the legislation of Emperor Justinian I, particularly in Novella 131. The Quinisext Council of 692 gave it formal recognition and ranked the sees in order of preeminence, but its organization remained dependent on the emperor, as when Leo the Isaurian altered the boundary of patriarchal jurisdiction between Rome and Constantinople. Especially following Quinisext, the pentarchy was at least philosophically accepted in Eastern Orthodoxy, but in the West, the Rome based patriarchy evolved into the Roman Catholic Church, which would reject the Council as well as the concept of the pentarchy, considering itself the supreme church with universal jurisdiction.

The greater authority of these sees in relation to others was tied to their political and ecclesiastical prominence; all were located in important cities and regions of the Roman Empire and were important centers of the Christian Church. Rome, Alexandria and Antioch were prominent from the time of early Christianity, while Constantinople came to the fore upon becoming the imperial residence in the 4th century. Thereafter, it was consistently ranked just after Rome. Jerusalem received a ceremonial place due to the city's importance in the early days of Christianity. Justinian and the Quinisext Council excluded from their pentarchical arrangement churches outside the empire, such as the then-flourishing Church of the East in Sassanid Persia, which they saw as heretical. Within the empire they recognized only the Chalcedonian (or Melkite) incumbents, regarding as illegitimate the non-Chalcedonian claimants of Alexandria and Antioch.

Infighting among the sees, and particularly the rivalry between Rome (which considered itself preeminent over all the church) and Constantinople (which came to hold sway over the other Eastern sees and which saw itself as equal to Rome, with Rome "first among equals"), prevented the pentarchy from outlasting the Roman Empire. The Islamic conquests of Alexandria, Jerusalem and Antioch in the 7th century left Constantinople the only Christian governed authority in the East, and afterward the concept of a "pentarchy" retained little more than symbolic significance.

Tensions between East and West, which culminated in the East–West Schism, and the rise of powerful, largely independent metropolitan sees and patriarchates outside the Byzantine Empire in Bulgaria, and later in Serbia and Russia, eroded the importance of the old imperial sees. Today, only the see of Rome still holds hegemonic authority over its entire Church, being the head of the Catholic Church. The see of Constantinople has only symbolic hegemony over the Eastern Orthodox Church and the see of Alexandria is only in autocephalous communion with the Oriental Orthodox Churches.

== Development towards the Pentarchy ==
=== Early Christianity ===
In the Apostolic Age (largely the 1st century) the Christian Church comprised an indefinite number of local churches that in the initial years looked to the first church at Jerusalem as its main centre and point of reference. But, by the 4th century, it had developed a system whereby the bishop of the capital of each civil province (the metropolitan bishop) normally held certain rights over the bishops of the other cities of the province (later called suffragan bishops).

Of the three sees that the First Council of Nicaea was to recognize as having such extraprovincial power, Rome is the one for which records are most available. The church in Rome intervened in other communities to help resolve conflicts. Pope Clement I did so in Corinth in the end of the 1st century. In the beginning of the 2nd century, Ignatius, Bishop of Antioch, speaks of the Church of Rome as "presiding in the region of the Romans" (ἥτις προκάθηται ἐν τόπῳ χωρίου Ῥωμαίων). In the end of that century, Pope Victor I attempted to excommunicate the Eastern bishops who continued to celebrate Easter on 14 Nisan, not on the following Sunday. However, the attempted excommunication did not take effect, so it is unclear if Victor I reversed his decision or his excommunication was ignored.

The first records of the exercise of authority by Antioch outside its own province of Syria date from the late 2nd century, when Serapion of Antioch intervened in Rhosus, a town in Cilicia, and also consecrated the third Bishop of Edessa, outside the Roman Empire. Bishops participating in councils held at Antioch in the middle of the 3rd century came not only from Syria, but also from Palestine, Arabia, and eastern Asia Minor. Dionysius of Alexandria spoke of these bishops as forming the "episcopate of the Orient", mentioning Demetrian, bishop of Antioch, in the first place.

In Egypt and the nearby African territories the bishop of Alexandria was at first the only metropolitan. When other metropolitan sees were established there, the bishop of Alexandria became known as the archbishop. In the mid-3rd century, Heraclas of Alexandria exercised his power as archbishop by deposing and replacing the Bishop of Thmuis. Thus Rome, Alexandria and Antioch had grown in ecclesiastical prominence such that by the early 4th century, they had long-recognised jurisdiction over more than one province of bishops each. Alexandria had attained primacy over Roman Egypt, Roman Libya, and Pentapolis. Rome had Primatial authority over provinces within 100 miles of the city.

=== Council of Nicaea ===
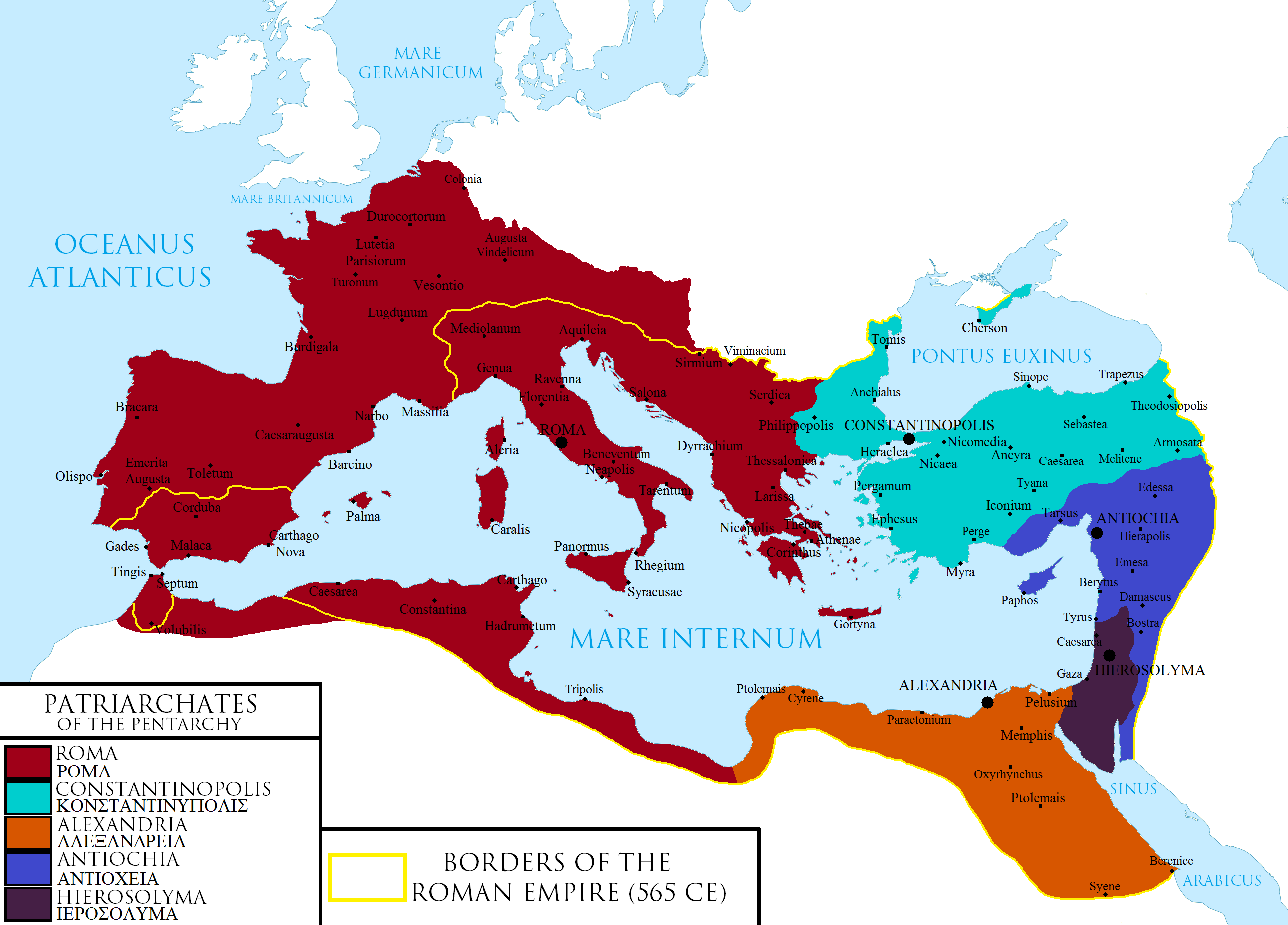
Pentarchy in 565 AD.

The First Council of Nicaea in 325, in whose sixth canon the title "metropolitan" appears for the first time, sanctioned the existing grouping of sees by provinces of the Roman empire, but also recognized that three sees, Alexandria, Antioch and Rome, already had authority over wider areas. In speaking of Antioch, it also spoke generically about "other provinces".

While the Council did not specify the extent of the authority of Rome or Antioch, it clearly indicated the area, even outside its own province of Egypt, over which Alexandria had authority, by referring to "the ancient customs of Egypt, Libya and Pentapolis, according to which the bishop of Alexandria has authority over all these places".

Immediately after mentioning the special traditions of wider authority of Rome, Alexandria and Antioch, the same canon speaks of the organization under metropolitans, which was also the subject of two previous canons. In this system, the bishop of the capital of each Roman province (the metropolitan) possessed certain rights with regard to the bishops of other cities of the province (suffragans).

In the interpretation of John H. Erickson, the Council saw the special powers of Rome and Alexandria, whose bishops were in effect metropolitans over several provinces, as exceptions to the general rule of organization by provinces, each with its own metropolitan. After the mention of the special traditions of Rome, Alexandria, Antioch and other provinces, canon 6 goes on immediately to speak of the metropolitan form of organization, which was also the topic of the two preceding canons.

This Council's recognition of the special powers of Rome, Alexandria and Antioch served as the basis of the theory of the three Petrine sees (Rome and Antioch were said to be founded by Saint Peter and Alexandria by his disciple Mark the Evangelist) that was later upheld, especially in Rome and Alexandria, in opposition to the theory of the five Pentarchy sees.

In its seventh canon, the Council attributed special honour, but not metropolitan authority, to the Bishop of Jerusalem, which was then called Aelia, and was in the province (Syria Palaestina) whose capital and Metropolitan was Caesarea.

=== Later councils ===
With the imperial capital having moved to Byzantium in 330, the re-named city of Constantinople became increasingly important in church affairs of the Greek East. The First Council of Constantinople (381) decreed in a canon of disputed validity: "The Bishop of Constantinople, however, shall have the prerogative of honour after the Bishop of Rome; because Constantinople is New Rome." This "prerogative of honour", though recognising the new Metropolitan status of the Capital See, did not entail jurisdiction outside his own "diocese". The Emperor Theodosius I, who called the Council, divided the eastern Roman Empire into five "dioceses": Egypt (under Alexandria), the East (under Antioch), Asia (under Ephesus), Pontus (under Caesarea Cappadociae), and Thrace (originally under Heraclea, later under Constantinople).

The Council also decreed: "The bishops are not to go beyond their dioceses to churches lying outside of their bounds, nor bring confusion on the churches; but let the Bishop of Alexandria, according to the canons, alone administer the affairs of Egypt; and let the bishops of the East manage the East alone, the privileges of the Church in Antioch, which are mentioned in the canons of Nicea, being preserved; and let the bishops of the Asian Diocese administer the Asian affairs only; and the Pontic bishops only Pontic matters; and the Thracian bishops only Thracian affairs."

The transfer of the capital of the empire from Rome to Constantinople in 330 enabled the latter to free itself from its ecclesiastical dependency on Heraclea and in little more than half a century to obtain this recognition of next-after-Rome ranking from the first Council held within its walls. Alexandria's objections to Constantinople's promotion, which led to a constant struggle between the two sees in the first half of the 5th century, were supported, at least until the Fourth Council of Constantinople of 869–870, by Rome, which proposed the theory that the most important sees were the three Petrine ones, with Rome in first place.

The Western bishops generally took no part in the First Council of Constantinople with the exception of Ascholius of Thessalonica, who at this time was under Roman jurisdiction. It is popularly believed that it was only until the mid-6th century that the Latin Church recognized it as ecumenical, but the earliest Latin collection of canons (the "Prisca" version) as well as citations of its creed by Pope Leo in his Tome and its canons by his legates during the Council of Chalcedon indicate that it had obtained acceptance long before this point. Archbishop Atticus would do much to expand the jurisdictional reach of Constantinople in the early 5th century.

The Council of Ephesus (431) defended the independence of the Church in Cyprus against the supra-metropolitan interference by Antioch, but in the same period Jerusalem succeeded in gaining supra-metropolitan power over the three provinces of Palestine.

After the Council of Chalcedon (451), the position of the Pentarchy's Patriarchate of Alexandria was weakened by a division in which the great majority of its Christian population followed the form of Christianity that its opponents called Miaphysitism.

The Council of Chalcedon (451), which marked a serious defeat of Alexandria, gave recognition, in its 28th canon, to Constantinople's extension of its power over Pontus and Asia in addition to Thrace. The Council justified this decision on the grounds that "the Fathers rightly granted privileges to the throne of old Rome, because it was the royal city", and that the First Council of Constantinople, "actuated by the same consideration, gave equal privileges to the most holy throne of New Rome, justly judging that the city which is honoured with the Sovereignty and the Senate, and enjoys equal privileges with the old imperial Rome, should in ecclesiastical matters also be magnified as she is, and rank next after her".

Pope Leo I, whose delegates were absent when this resolution was passed and who protested against it, recognized the council as ecumenical and confirmed its doctrinal decrees, but rejected canon 28, on the ground that it contravened the sixth canon of Nicaea and infringed the rights of Alexandria and Antioch. By that time, Constantinople, as the permanent residence of the emperor, had enormous influence.

Canon 9 of the Council declared: "If a bishop or clergyman should have a difference with the metropolitan of the province, let him have recourse to the Exarch of the Diocese, or to the throne of the Imperial City of Constantinople, and there let it be tried." This has been interpreted as conferring on the see of Constantinople a greater privilege than what any council ever gave Rome (Johnson) or as of much lesser significance than that (Hefele).

Thus in little more than a hundred years the structural arrangement by provinces envisaged by the First Council of Nicaea was, according to John H. Erickson, transformed into a system of five large divisions headed by the bishops of Rome, Constantinople, Alexandria, Antioch, and Jerusalem. He does not use for these divisions the term patriarchate because the term patriarch as a uniform term for the heads of the divisions came into use only in the time of Emperor Justinian I in the following century, and because there is little suggestion that the divisions were regarded as quasi-sovereign entities, as patriarchates are in Eastern Orthodox ecclesiology. Because of the decision of the Council of Ephesus, Cyprus maintained its independence from the Antioch division, and the arrangement did not apply outside the empire, where separate "catholicates" developed in Mesopotamia (Church of the East) and Armenia (Armenian Church).

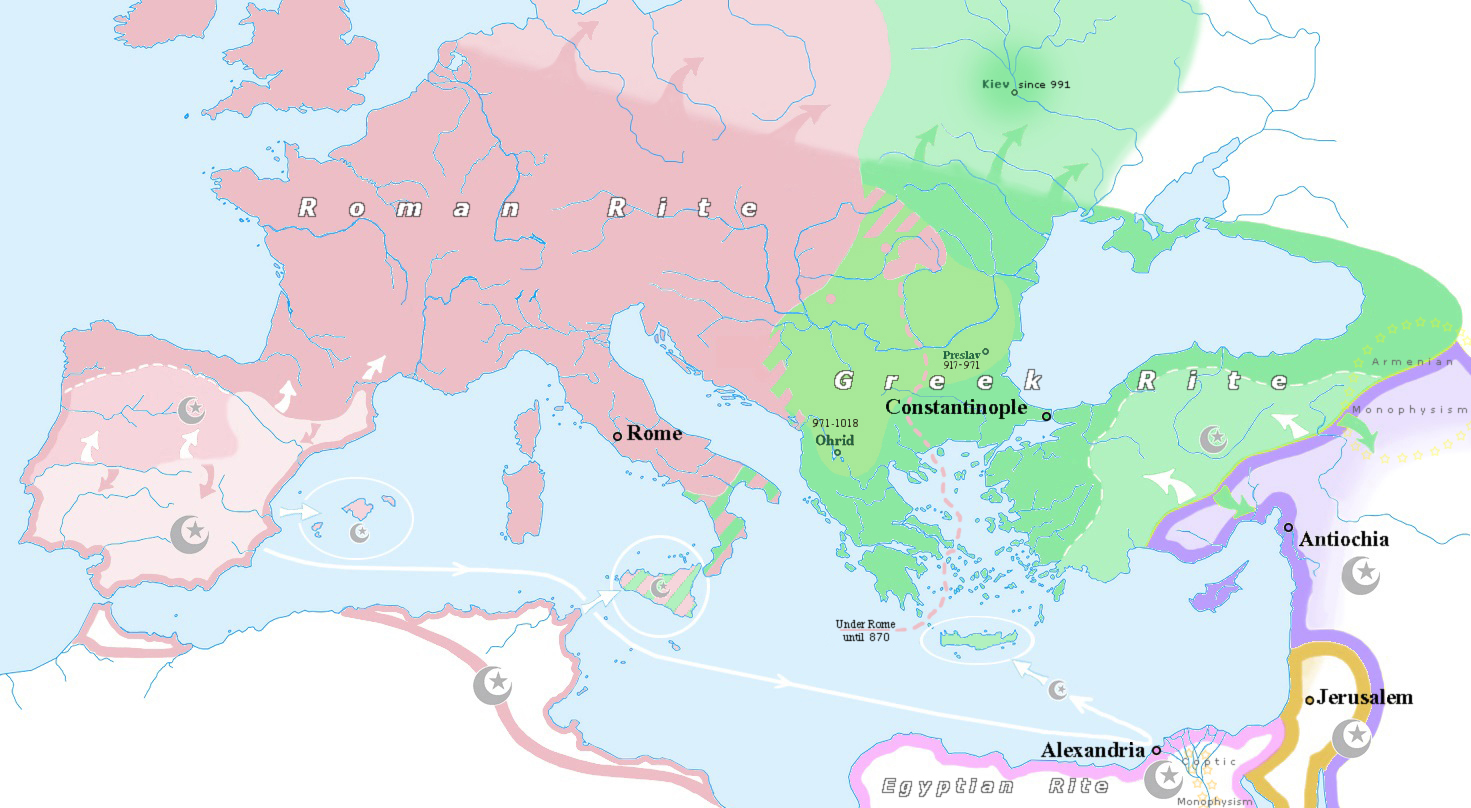
Map of the Pentarchy around the year 1000. White interior: conquered by the Islamic caliphates. White lined: temporarily occupied by the Islamic caliphates or emirates. Arrows: expansion.

== Formulation of the pentarchy theory ==
The basic principles of the pentarchy theory, which, according to the Byzantinist historian Milton V. Anastos, "reached its highest development in the period from the eleventh century to the middle of the fifteenth", go back to the 6th-century Justinian I, who often stressed the importance of all five of the patriarchates mentioned, especially in the formulation of dogma.

Justinian was the first to use (in 531) the title of "patriarch" to designate exclusively the bishops of Rome, Constantinople, Alexandria, Antioch, and Jerusalem, setting the bishops of these five sees on a level superior to that of metropolitans.

Justinian's scheme for a renovatio imperii (renewal of the empire) included, as well as ecclesiastical matters, a rewriting of Roman law in the Corpus Juris Civilis and an only partially successful reconquest of the West, including the city of Rome.

When in 680 Constantine IV called the Third Council of Constantinople, he summoned the metropolitans and other bishops of the jurisdiction of Constantinople; but since there were representatives of all five bishops to whom Justinian had given the title of Patriarch, the Council declared itself ecumenical. This has been interpreted as signifying that a council is ecumenical if attended by representatives of all five patriarchs.

The first Council classified (in the East, but not in the West, which did not participate in it) as ecumenical that mentioned together all five sees of the pentarchy in the order indicated by Justinian I is the Council in Trullo of 692, which was called by Justinian II: "Renewing the enactments by the 150 Fathers assembled at the God-protected and imperial city, and those of the 630 who met at Chalcedon; we decree that the see of Constantinople shall have equal privileges with the see of Old Rome, and shall be highly regarded in ecclesiastical matters as that is, and shall be second after it. After Constantinople shall be ranked the See of Alexandria, then that of Antioch, and afterwards the See of Jerusalem."

The 7th and 8th centuries saw an increasing attribution of significance to the pentarchy as the five pillars of the Church upholding its infallibility: it was held to be impossible that all five should at the same time be in error. They were compared to the five senses of the human body, all equal and entirely independent of each other, and none with ascendancy over the others.

The Byzantine view of the pentarchy had a strongly anti-Roman orientation, being put forward against the Roman claim to the final word on all Church matters and to the right to judge even the patriarchs. This was not a new claim: in about 446 Pope Leo I had expressly claimed authority over the whole Church: "The care of the universal Church should converge towards Peter's one seat, and nothing anywhere should be separated from its Head." In a synod held in Rome in 864, Pope Nicholas I declared that no ecumenical council could be called without authorization by Rome; and, until Hadrian II (867–872), none of the popes recognized the legitimacy of all four eastern patriarchs, but only those of Alexandria and Antioch.

The principal adviser of the two last-named popes, Anastasius Bibliothecarius, accepted the Byzantine comparison of the pentarchy with the five senses of the human body, but added the qualification that the patriarchate of Rome, which he likened to the sense of sight, ruled the other four.

While the theory of the pentarchy is still upheld by the Greek Orthodox Church successor to the Byzantine Church, it is questioned by other Eastern Orthodox, who view it as "a highly artificial theory, never implemented until the great 5c. debates over Christology had removed the Alexandrian (Coptic) Church from communion and fatally split the weakened Church of Antioch. In addition, the theory's insistence on the sovereignty of these five patriarchs was at least debatable".

The five ancient patriarchates, (the Pentarchy), listed in order of preeminence ranked by the Quinisext Council in 692:

The five ancient patriarchates (the Pentarchy)
Title	Church	Recognition / Additional notes
Patriarch of Rome	the pope of Rome, the chief of the Latin Catholic Church	Originally primus inter pares according to Eastern Orthodoxy, recognized in 325 by the First Council of Nicaea. Currently, not an Episcopal or Patriarchal authority in the Eastern Orthodox Church, following the Great Schism in 1054.
Patriarch of Constantinople	the chief of the Ecumenical Patriarchate of Constantinople	The primus inter pares of post-Schism Eastern Orthodoxy, recognized in 381 by the First Council of Constantinople.
Patriarch of Alexandria	the pope of All Africa and the chief of the Greek Orthodox Church of Alexandria	Recognized in 325 by the First Council of Nicaea.
Patriarch of Antioch	the head of the Greek Orthodox Church of Antioch and All the East in the Near East	Recognized in 325 by the First Council of Nicaea.
Patriarch of Jerusalem	the chief of the Eastern Orthodox Patriarchate of Jerusalem in Israel, Palestine, Jordan and All Arabia	Recognized in 451 by the Council of Chalcedon.

== After the East–West Schism ==
By 661, the Muslim Rashidun Caliphate had taken over the territories assigned to the patriarchates of Alexandria, Antioch and Jerusalem, which thereafter were never more than partially and temporarily recovered. In 732, Leo III the Isaurian, in revenge for the opposition of Pope Gregory III to the emperor's iconoclast policies, transferred Sicily, Calabria and Illyria from the patriarchate of Rome (whose jurisdiction until then extended as far east as Thessalonica) to that of Constantinople.

Nearly all the Byzantine writers who treated the subject of the pentarchy assumed that Constantinople, as the seat of the ruler of the empire and therefore of the world, was the highest among the patriarchates and, like the emperor, had the right to govern them. This feeling was further intensified after the East–West Schism in 1054, which reduced the pentarchy to a tetrarchy, but it existed long before that. The idea that with the transfer of the imperial capital from Rome to Constantinople primacy in the Church was also transferred is found in undeveloped form as early as John Philoponus (c. 490 – c. 570); it was enunciated in its most advanced form by Photios I of Constantinople (c. 810 – c. 893), and was embraced by his successors, including Callistus Ι (1350–1353, 1355–1363), Philotheus (1353–1354, 1364–1376), and Nilus (1379–1388).

Thus, for the Byzantines of the first half of the second millennium, the government of the Christian Church was a primacy belonging to the patriarchate of Constantinople, which, however, was choosing not to insist on it with regard to the west. This was illustrated by Nilus Doxapatris, who in 1142–43 insisted strongly on the primacy of the Church of Constantinople, which he regarded as inherited from Rome because of the transfer of the capital and because Rome had fallen into the hands of the barbarians, but who expressly restricted Byzantine authority to the other three eastern patriarchates. Patriarch Callistus, mentioned above, did the same about two hundred years later. "In other words, Rome was definitely excluded from the Constantinopolitan sphere of influence and put on a par with Constantinople, as can be inferred from Nilus's statement that the bishops of Constantinople and Rome, and only these two, were called oecumenical patriarchs."

== Rise of other patriarchates ==
Map of Bulgaria during the reign of Simeon I (893–927)

The Patriarchate of Constantinople recognized the patriarchal status of the Bulgarian Orthodox Church (Metropolitanate of Preslav) in 927, which thus became the first autocephalous patriarchate outside the empire recognized by the Orthodox Church (recognition had not been granted to the patriarchates of the Church of the East and Oriental Orthodoxy). The Georgian Orthodox and Apostolic Church became autocephalous in 486 and was elevated to patriarchate in 1010. The Serbian Orthodox Church became autocephalous in 1219, and was elevated to patriarchate in 1346 (although deemed schismatic at first). The Russian Orthodox Church became a patriarchate in 1589 when its metropolitan was elevated to the rank of patriarch.

Today the Eastern Orthodox Church includes nine patriarchates: Ecumenical Patriarchate of Constantinople; Patriarchate of Alexandria; Patriarchate of Antioch; Bulgarian Patriarchate; Georgian Patriarchate; Patriarchate of Jerusalem; Russian Patriarchate; Romanian Patriarchate; Serbian Patriarchate.

Within the Catholic Church, in addition to Rome itself and Jerusalem, the cities of Venice, Lisbon and Goa also have status as patriarchates, established in 1451, 1716 and 1886 respectively. There have also been Latin patriarchates for the remainder of the original pentarchy, namely Constantinople, Alexandria and Antioch, but these were all abolished in 1964. There are, however, various Eastern Catholic Patriarchs who lay claim to these sees.

Lastly, there is also the Patriarchate of the West Indies, which has been vacant since 1963.

The Western Catholic patriarchates are not autocephalous, like their Eastern Catholic counterparts; they are largely honorific titles, and the other Catholic patriarchs are all subject to the patriarch of Rome, i.e. the pope.

== Outside views ==
The Roman Catholic Church has partially recognized the Pentarchy, as an equal Pentarchy with an order of precedence starting with Rome (immediately followed by Constantinople). Oriental Orthodoxy still holds to just Rome, Alexandria, and Antioch. The Assyrian Church of the East does not recognize the pentarchy.

== Current patriarchs of the five sees ==
The following are the current archbishops of the Pentarchal sees, along with the churches that recognize them.

See	Catholic Church	Eastern Orthodox Church	Oriental Orthodox Churches
Rome	Pope Leo XIV (Latin Church)	None	None
Constantinople	None	Bartholomew I (Church of Constantinople)	Sahak II Mashalian (Armenian Apostolic Church)
Alexandria	Ibrahim Isaac Sidrak (Coptic Catholic Church)	Theodore II (Greek Orthodox Church of Alexandria)	Tawadros II (Coptic Orthodox Church)
Antioch	Bechara Boutros al-Rahi (Maronite Church); Ignatius Joseph III Yonan (Syriac Catholic Church); Youssef Absi (Melkite Greek Catholic Church)	John X (Greek Orthodox Church of Antioch)	Ignatius Aphrem II (Syriac Orthodox Church)
Jerusalem	Pierbattista Pizzaballa (Latin Church)	Theophilos III (Greek Orthodox Church of Jerusalem)	Nourhan Manougian (Armenian Apostolic Church)

== See also ==
- Catholicos
- Primate (bishop)
- Limits of the Five Patriarchates

== Sources ==
- Erickson, John H. (1991). The Challenge of Our Past: Studies in Orthodox Canon Law and Church History. Crestwood, NY: St. Vladimir's Seminary Press. ISBN 9780881410860.
- Erickson, John H. (1992). "The Local Churches and Catholicity: An Orthodox Perspective". The Jurist. 52: 490–508.
- Kiminas, Demetrius (2009). The Ecumenical Patriarchate: A History of Its Metropolitanates with Annotated Hierarch Catalogs. Wildside Press LLC. ISBN 9781434458766.
- Meyendorff, John (1989). Imperial unity and Christian divisions: The Church 450-680 A.D. The Church in history. Vol. 2. Crestwood, NY: St. Vladimir's Seminary Press. ISBN 9780881410563.
- Meyendorff, John (1996). Rome, Constantinople, Moscow: Historical and Theological Studies. Crestwood, NY: St. Vladimir's Seminary Press. ISBN 9780881411348.
- Pheidas, Blasios I. (2005). "Papal Primacy and Patriarchal Pentarchy in the Orthodox Tradition". The Petrine Ministry: Catholics and Orthodox in Dialogue. New York: The Newman Press. ISBN 9780809143344.
