= Minuscule 69 =

15th century manuscript

- New Testament manuscript
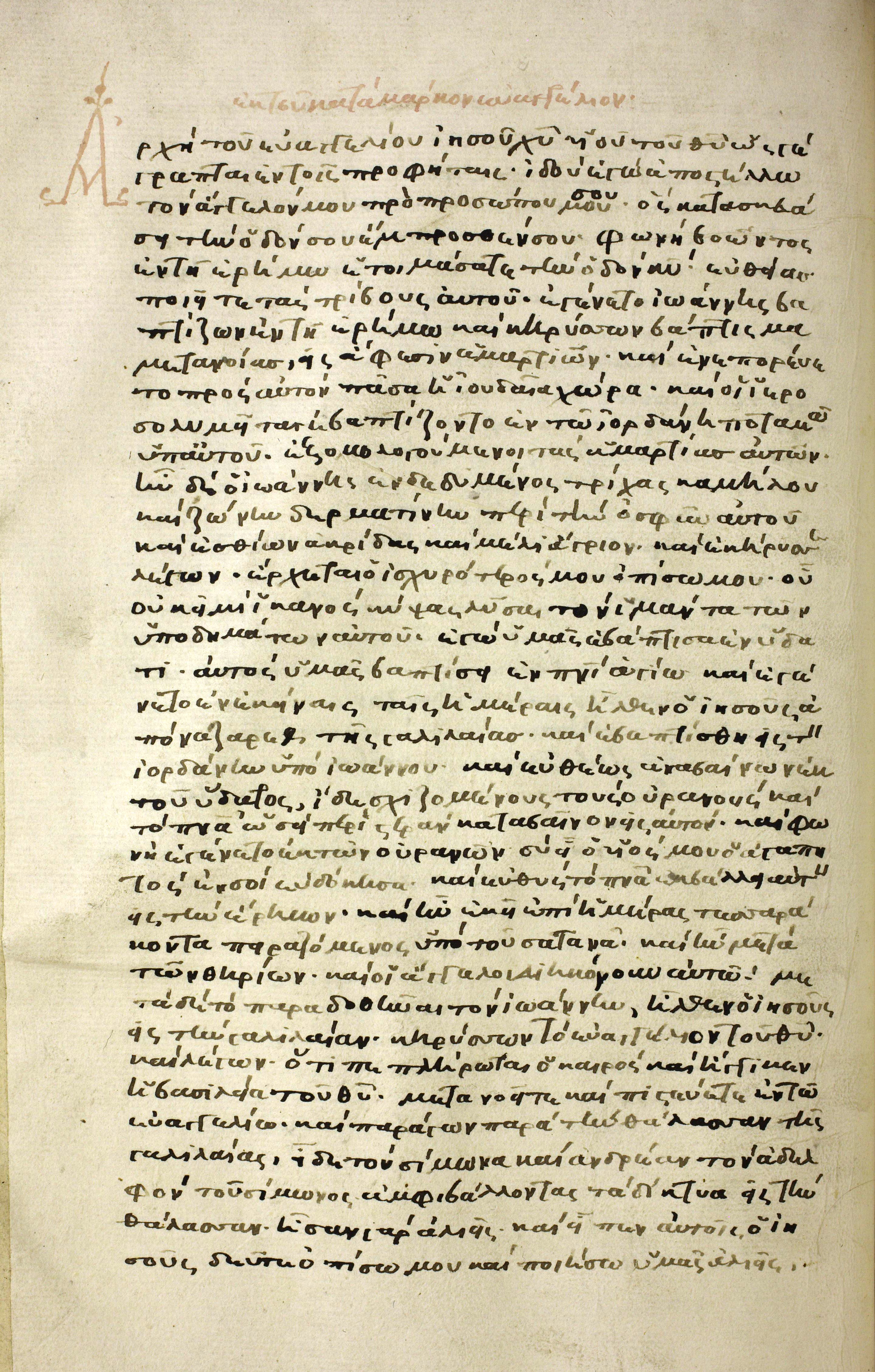
- Name: Codex Leicester
- Text: New Testament †
- Date: 15th century
- Script: Greek
- Now at: Leicester
- Size: 37.8 cm by 27 cm
- Type: Caesarean text-type (Gospels), Byzantine (rest of books)
- Category: III, V
- Note: no marginalia

Minuscule 69, known as the Codex Leicester or Codex Leicestrensis, is a Greek minuscule manuscript of the New Testament on paper and parchment leaves. It is designated by the siglum 69 in the Gregory-Aland numbering of New Testament manuscripts, and δ 505 in the von Soden numbering of New Testament manuscripts.Using the study of comparative writing styles (palaeography), it has been dated to the 15th century. Some leaves of the codex are lost. It has been examined and collated by many palaeographers and textual critics. Although it is of a late date, its text is remarkable from the point of view of textual criticism.

== Description ==
=== Contents ===
The manuscript is a codex (precursor to the modern book format), containing the entire New Testament with four gaps (Matthew 1:1–18:15; Acts 10:45–14:17; Jude 7–25; Revelation 19:10–22:21) on 213 leaves (sized 37.8 cm by 27 cm). The text of the manuscript skips from Acts 10:45 to 14:17 without a break, which possibly indicates the copyist copied it from a defective manuscript. The codex is written on 91 leaves of parchment and 122 of paper. According to biblical scholar Frederick H. A. Scrivener, it is in fact 83 leaves of vellum and 130 of paper. Usually two parchment leaves are followed by three paper leaves. The paper was of very poor quality. The quality is so bad that four of the leaves were only written on one side. The leaves are arranged in quarto (four leaves in a quire). There are catchwords from quire to quire, and in the first half of each quire the leaves are numbered (2nd, 3rd, 4th).

The original sequence of the books was: Pauline epistles, Acts of the Apostles, Catholic epistles, Revelation of John, Gospels. The Pauline epistles precede Acts of the Apostles (as also seen in Codex Sinaiticus). This order was changed by a binder to the following: Gospels, Pauline epistles, Acts, Catholic epistles, and Revelation of John. The text of Rev 18:7–19:10 is fragmentary.

It has some non-biblical additional material like: An explanation of the Creed and the Seven Councils (on fol. 159v), the Lives of the Apostles (on fol. 160v), Limits of the Five Patriarchates (on fol. 161r). These are also seen in the codices Minuscule 211 and 543.

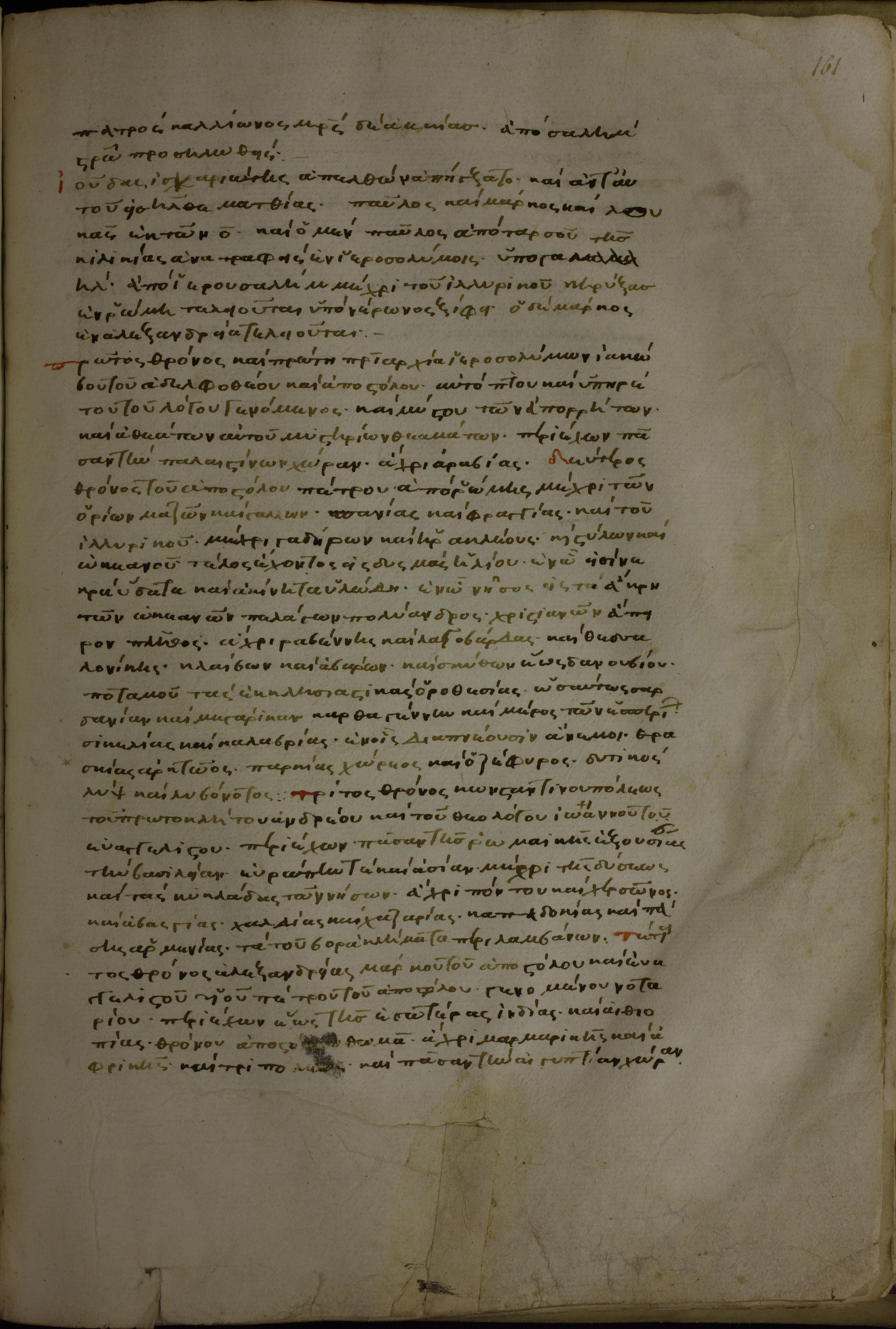
Folio 161 (recto) of the codex with the text of "The Limits of the Five Patriarchates"

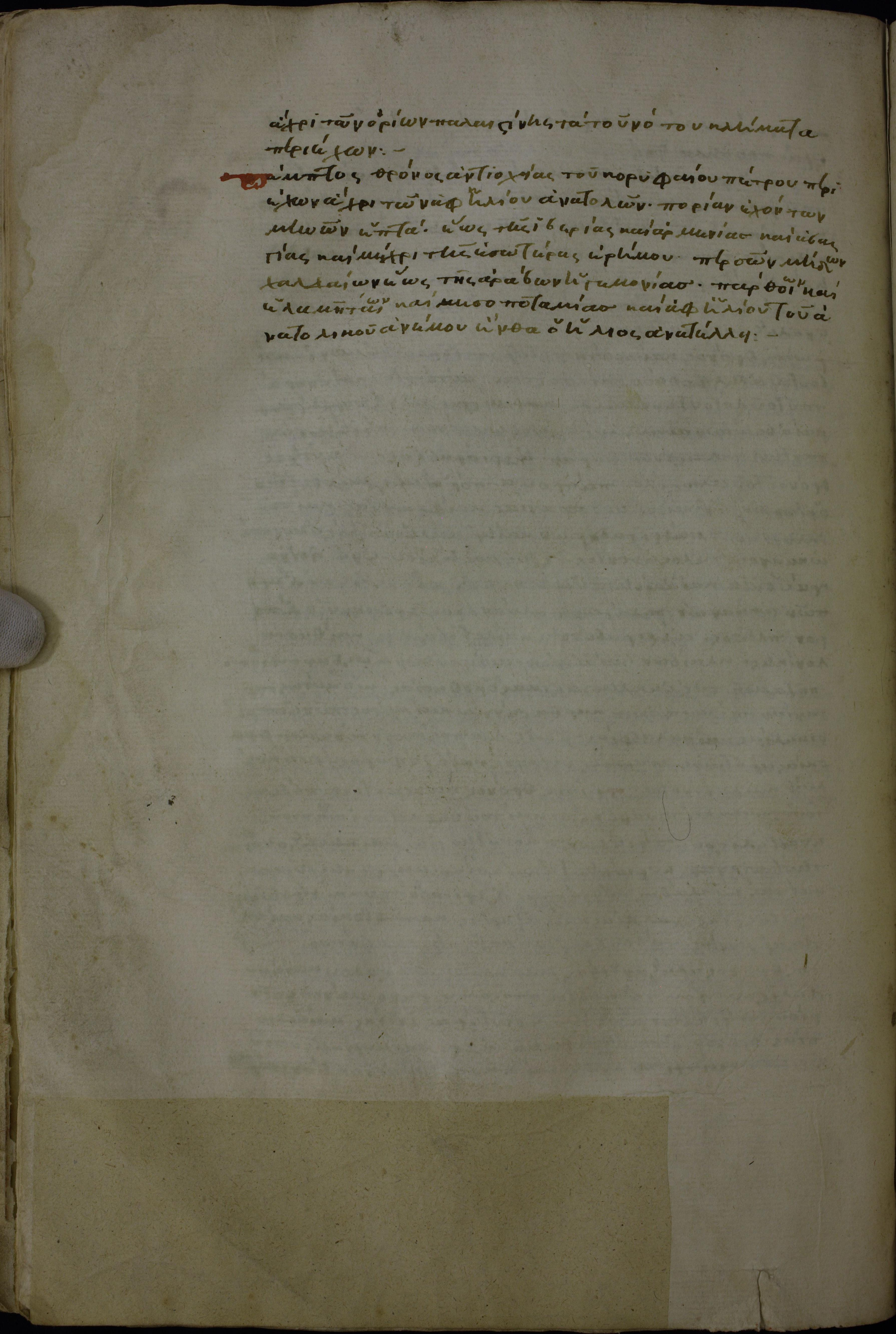
Folio 161 (verso) with the text of "The Limits of the Five Patriarchates"

It contains an introduction to the Epistle to the Hebrews, the tables of contents (known as κεφαλαια / kephalaia) precede the three later Gospels with very unusual variations, and even without corresponding numbers of the κεφαλαια (chapters) in the margin. There is no division into chapters or sections, no references to the Eusebian Canons (an early division of the Gospels into sections), and no liturgical markings in the margin. The marginal notes are often illegible. It contains subscriptions at the end of each book. The subscriptions contain the numbers of lines (known as στιχοι / stichoi) and the numbers of phrases (known as ρηματα / rhemata).

The headings of the Gospels are titled as ἐκ τοῦ κατὰ Μάρκον etc., something also seen in Minuscule 178.

=== Scribal habit ===
The text is written in one column per page, 37–38 lines per page. The large initial letters at the beginning of each book are written in red ink.

The writing is rather rough and inelegant. It was written by a strange hand, the letter epsilon / ε being recumbent and so much like the letter alpha / α, that it is not clear which was intended. The accents are placed over the succeeding consonant of the vowel. According to Scrivener, "The whole style of writing resembling a careless scrawl". There are numerous marginal notes written by a beautiful hand, who wrote words Ειμι Ιλερμου Χαρκου (I am William Chark) at the top of the first page. The hand of the corrector is nearly as old as the scribe.

The name Ἰησοῦς (Jesus) is always written in full up to John 21:15, where we meet with the nomen sacrum ι̅ς̅, and in 41 other places, 19 of which are in Acts. The nomina sacra (an early Christian method of designating important names/words) are contracted in a usual way: δ̅α̅δ̅ (δαυιδ / David), ι̅ς̅ (Ιησους / Jesus), κ̅ς̅ (κυριος / Lord), ο̅υ̅ν̅ο̅ς̅ (ουρανος / Heaven), α̅ν̅ο̅ς̅ (ανθρωπος / man), χ̅ς̅ (χριστος / Christ), ι̅η̅λ̅ (Ισραηλ / Israel), ι̅λ̅η̅μ̅ (Ἱεροσόλυμα / Jerusalem), σ̅η̅ρ̅ (σωτηρ / saviour), π̅η̅ρ̅ (πατηρ / father), μ̅η̅ρ̅ (μητηρ / mother), π̅ν̅α̅ (πνευμα / spirit), σ̅τ̅ρ̅ο̅ς̅ (σταυρος / cross), and π̅α̅ρ̅ν̅ο̅ς̅ (παρθενος / virgin). The abbreviation χ̅ς̅ is used once for χρηστος.

Scholar William Hugh Ferrar enumerated 1129 errors of itacism in the codex: ο for ω (190 occurrences), ω for ο (126), η for ει (93), ει for η (104), ι for ει (77), ει for ι (62), η for ι (87), ι for η (46), ε for αι (73), αι for ε (72), ε for η (24), η for ε (20), υ for η (27 – rare elsewhere), η for υ (28), ου for ω (13), ω for ου (16), οι for ι (3), ι for οι (3), η for ευ (1 – in Luke 12:16), υ for ι (15), ι for υ (14), υ for η (6), υ for ε (1), υ for οι (4), υ for ει (3), οι for υ (4), οι for η (9), ο for ου (3), η for οι (3). There is also θ for τ (after σ) in Mark 10:40 and Luke 11:7.

Nu-moveable is rarely omitted.

There are some unusual grammar forms: ειπαν (twice only – Matthew 26:35; Luke 20:2), ηλθατε (Matthew 25:36), εξηλθατε (Matthew 26:55; Mark 14:48; Luke 7:24, Luke 7:25, Luke 7:26; Luke 22:52), εισηλθατε (all instances), ανεπεσαν (John 6:10), παραγενομενος (Luke 14:21).

In some cases the accusatives are written with ending -αν for -α, e.g. νυκταν, θυγατεραν, χειραν. The gender is sometimes altered, verbs in -αω or -οω are formed as those in -εω (e.g. επηρωτουν, Luke 3:10; Luke 20:27; επετιμουν, Luke 18:15; ετολμουν; ερωτουν; εμβριμουμενος and others). The augment is often omitted after Luke 11:44, but all before Luke Luke 9, and there is a double augment in ηπηντησαν (John 4:51).

== Text ==
The text of the codex is very remarkable; it belongs to Family 13 as a very important member of the group. The Greek text of the Gospels of this codex is considered to be a representative of the Caesarean text-type. The text-types are groups of different New Testament manuscripts which share specific or generally related readings, which then differ from each other group, and thus the conflicting readings can separate out the groups. These are then used to determine the original text as published; there are three main groups with names: Alexandrian, Western, and Byzantine. Biblical scholar Kurt Aland placed it in Category III of his New Testament manuscript text classification system. Category III manuscripts are described as having "a small but not a negligible proportion of early readings, with a considerable encroachment of [Byzantine] readings, and significant readings from other sources as yet unidentified." An analysis using the Claremont Profile Method, confirmed its placement among Family 13 (ƒ^{13})

In the Pauline epistles and Catholic epistles, its text is considered a representative of the Byzantine text-type. For these books, Aland placed its text in Category V (Category V manuscripts are "Manuscripts with a purely or predominantly Byzantine text"). In the Book of Revelation its text belongs to the Byzantine text-type, but with a large number of unique textual variants, in close relationship to Uncial 046 and Minuscule 61, which appears to have been copied from it. These three manuscripts constitute a subgroup of the Byzantine text-type. Although there is no liturgical markings in the codex, it is likely many of its various readings have arisen from lectionaries.

The text of Christ's agony at Gethsemane (Luke 22:43–44) is placed after Matt 26:39. The Pericope Adulterae (John 7:53–8:11) is placed after Luke 21. This is typical for the manuscripts of the Ferrar Group. In John 4:5 it reads Σιχαρ for Συχαρ. In 2 Cor 11:17 it reads ανθρωπον for κυριον.

== History ==
Textual critic Wettstein and biblical scholar J. Rendel Harris dated the manuscript to the 14th century, but scholar C. R. Gregory dated it to the 15th century. It is currently dated by the INTF to the 15th century. M. R. James suggested that it was written by Emmanuel from Constantinople.

The manuscript was presented to George Neville, Archbishop of York (1465–1472). It once belonged to Richard Brinkley (or Brinkeley), who probably got it from Covenant of Grey Friars at Cambridge (like Codex Montfortianus). Then it belonged to William Chark (or Charc), mentioned in marginal notes of Codex Montfortianus. Then it belonged to Thomas Hayne, who in 1641 gave this codex with his other books to the Leicester Library.

John Mill was permitted to use this manuscript at Oxford, and collated it there in 1671 (as L). Another collation was made by John Jackson and William Tiffin, and it was lent to Wettstein through César de Missy. Wettstein had observed a close affinity between this codex and minuscule 13. It was also examined by Edward Gee. Tregelles re-collated it in 1852 for his edition of the Greek New Testament. Scrivener collated it again in 1855 and published his results, with a full description in the Appendix to his "Codex Augiensis". It was collated by T. K. Abbott along with three other manuscripts of the Ferrar family (marked by L). It was examined and described by biblical scholar Rendel Harris. Biblical scholar Caspar René Gregory saw it in 1883.

It was formerly held in the library of the Town Council of Leicester. The codex is now located in the Leicestershire Record Office (Cod. 6 D 32/1) at Leicester.

== See also ==
- List of New Testament minuscules
- Family 13
- Textual criticism
