= Minuscule 211 =

- New Testament manuscript
- Text: Gospels
- Date: 12th century
- Script: Greek-Arabic
- Now at: Biblioteca Marciana
- Size: 29.5 cm by 23 cm
- Type: mixed
- Category: none
- Note: marginalia

Minuscule 211 (in the Gregory-Aland numbering), ε 234 (Soden), is a Greek-Arabic diglot minuscule manuscript of the New Testament, on parchment. Palaeographically it has been assigned to the 12th century. The manuscript is lacunose. It has marginalia.

== Description ==
The codex contains the text of the four Gospels, on 280 parchment leaves (size 29.5 cm by 23 cm), in quarto (four leaves in quire), with two lacunae (Luke 1:1-2:32; John 1:1-4:2). It is written in two columns per page, 26 lines per page.

The text is divided according to the Ammonian Sections (in Mark 236 sections – with the last numbered section in 16:12), with references to the Eusebian Canons (irregularly inserted).

It contains the table of the κεφαλαια (table of contents) to Luke, synaxaria, Menologion, subscriptions at the end of each Gospel, with numbers of ρηματα, and numbers of στιχοι. In additional material it has Limits of the Five Patriarchates (like codices 69 and 543).

== Text ==
The Greek text of the codex is a mixture of the text-types. Aland did not place it in any Category.

According to the Claremont Profile Method it represents textual group Λ in Luke 10 and Luke 20. In Luke 1 the manuscript is defective.

It contains the text of the Pericope Adulterae (John 7:53-8:11).

== History ==
It was examined by Birch, Burgon, and Lake. C. R. Gregory saw the manuscript in 1886.

It is currently housed at the Biblioteca Marciana (Fondo ant. 539), at Venice.

== See also ==
- List of New Testament minuscules
- Biblical manuscript
- Textual criticism
