= Chersonesos (Sicily) =

Ancient city of Magna Graecia in Sicily, Italy

Chersonesos or Chersonesus (Greek: Χερσόνησος) was an ancient city of Magna Graecia in Sicily, Italy. It was one of the oldest Greek colonies in Sicily, being founded in 717 or 716 BCE. (Jerome, ap. Eusebius, Chronikon, 157). Its precise location is not now known, but it is near Syracuse (Ptol. 3. 94. 4).
