= Chersonesus (western Crete) =

Ancient town of west Crete

Coordinates: 35°22′47″N 23°32′20″E

Chersonesus or Chersonesos (Ancient Greek: Χερσόνησος) was a town on the west coast of ancient Crete, nearly directly opposite Cyrenaica.

The site of Chersonesus is located near modern Cape Karavoutas or Koutoulos.
