= Kherson oat =

Oat strain

Kherson oat is a spring oat.

== Summary ==
In 1896, this kind of oat was introduced to the United States from Southern Russia by the Nebraska Agricultural Experiment Station although its origin is unknown. In 1919, it was grown in about three million acres. Not many oat varieties in the United States are better than the Kherson in economic importance or in prospective value. It is one of the most distributed early choices, especially in the Corn Belt and the central section of the Great Plains area.

It was put through an experiment to decide whether the Sixty Day oat or the Kherson oat was better for the country. For the two years, that Kherson oat was studied and yielded, it was averaged slightly better than other kinds.
