= Bargil Pixner =

Italian monk, Biblical scholar and archaeologist (1921-2002)

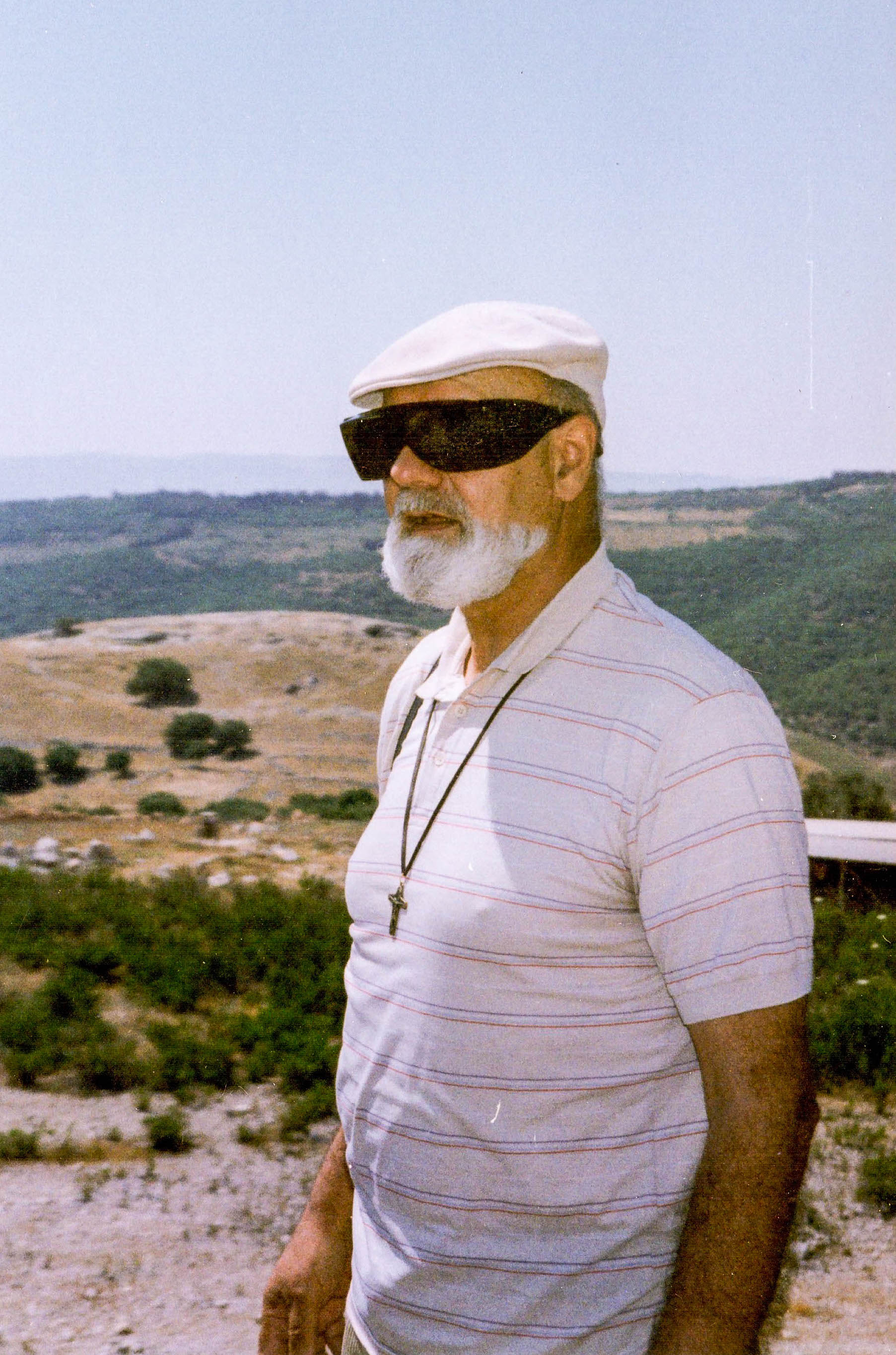
- Pixner in 1994
- Born: March 23, 1921; Untermais, South Tyrol, Italy
- Died: April 5, 2002 (aged 81); Jerusalem, Israel
- Citizenship: Italy; United States

Bargil Pixner (March 23, 1921 – April 5, 2002) was an ethnically German Italian-American monk of the Order of Saint Benedict, Biblical scholar and archaeologist, and commentator on the Dead Sea Scrolls.

== Biography ==
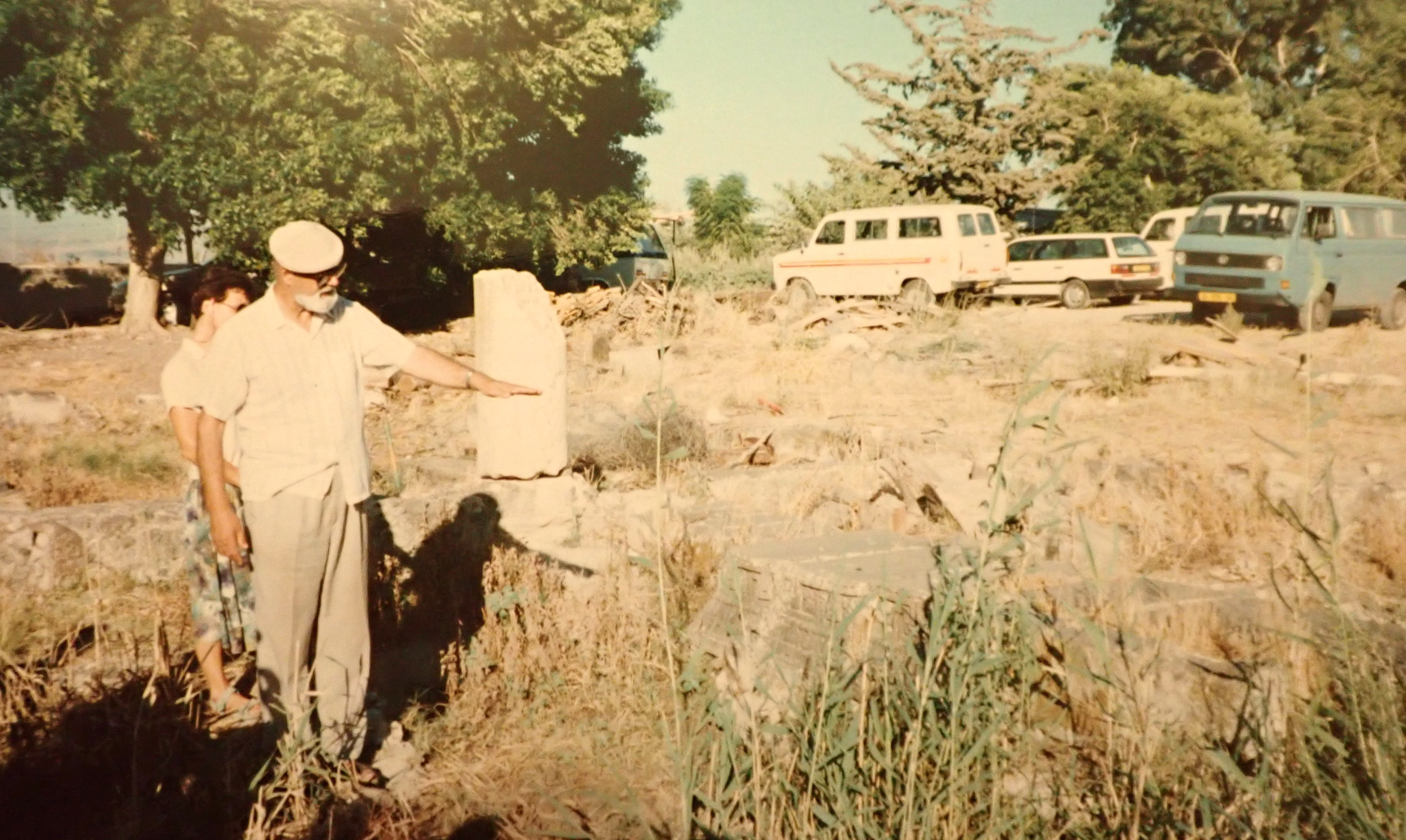
Bargil Pixner explaining the ruins of Magdala

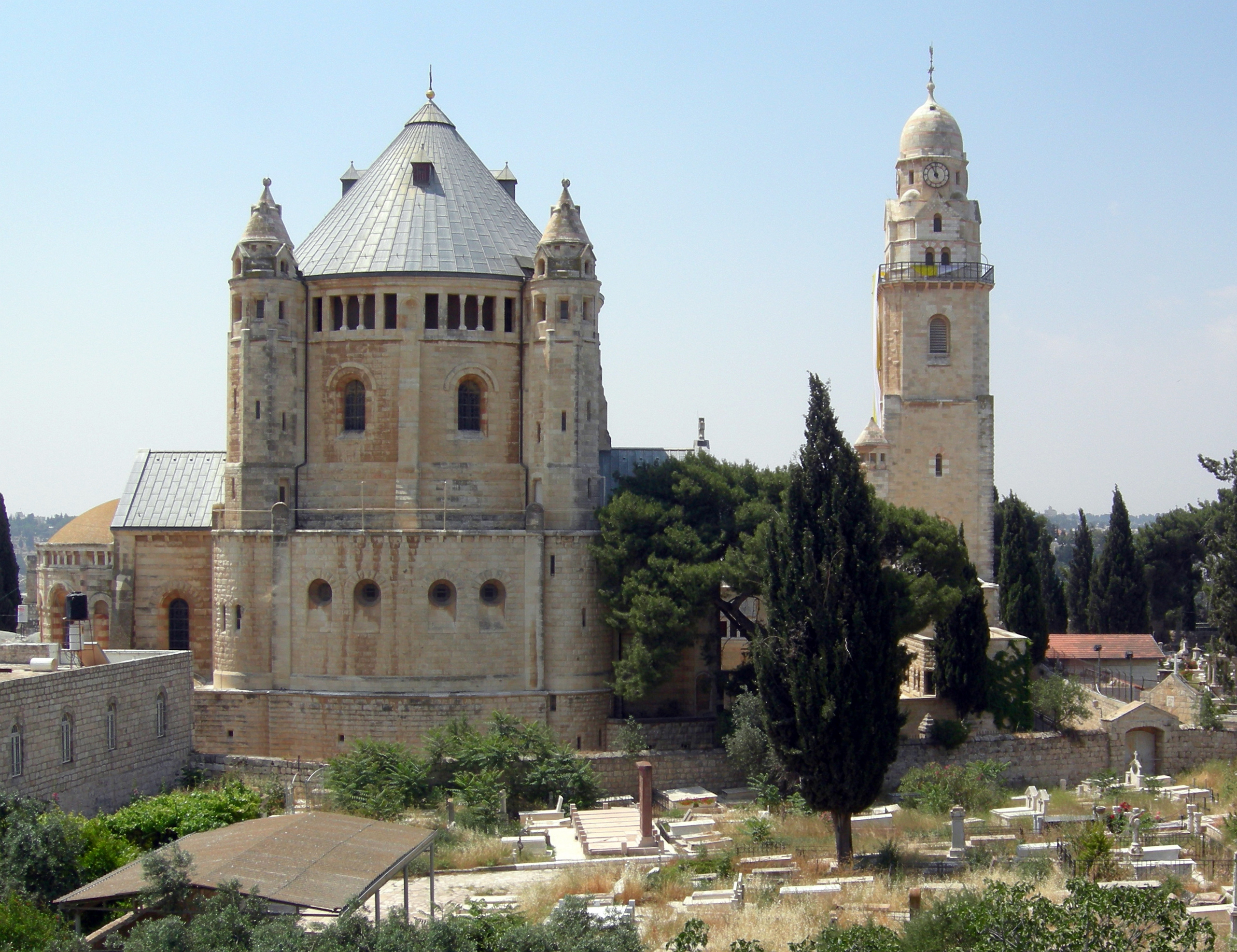
Abbey of the Dormition, where Pixner took his final vows and later served as a prior

Pixner was born in 1921, the first of eight children, in Untermais, Merano, South Tyrol. He started his study of theology in 1940 in Brixen and joined the Saint Joseph's Missionary Society of Mill Hill's Tyrolean branch in 1941.

During World War II, Pixner was sent to the Eastern Front in 1944 after refusing to take an oath of allegiance to Hitler, but he escaped from Silesia in May 1945.

Pixner was ordained a priest in 1946 in Brixen immediately prior to leaving for missionary work in the Philippines, where he headed a leprosy centre in Santa Barbara, Iloilo for the next eight years. He later worked in France, Italy, and the United States, becoming a US citizen.

In May 1969, Pixner moved to Israel, co-founding Neve Shalom, a peace village, located near the biblical Emmaus, and entered the Order of Saint Benedict in 1972, taking his final vows at the Abbey of the Dormition in Jerusalem in 1974. Pixner spent the next twelve years organizing the construction of an affiliated abbey at Tabgha before returning to Hagia Maria Sion Abbey in 1994 and then serving as a prior. Pixner gave tours of the Holy Land to famous pilgrims such as Jimmy Carter and Helmut Kohl.

== Theories ==
Pixner's theories, linking archaeological sites to events and figures in the Bible, have been met with mixed acceptance by scholars. In particular, he argued for a connection between Jesus and the Essenes and for the identification of the "Essene Gateway" (excavated beginning in 1977) on Mount Zion, and the dating of the crucifixion to Friday, April 7, AD 30. He shared Bagatti and Testa's thesis of a Church of Zion, Jerusalem in the 3rd–4th Centuries.

Pixner also identified a site on the north shore of the Sea of Galilee as the site of Bethsaida in a 1985 article, an identification which the State of Israel made official in 1989 after excavations in 1987. Pixner showed the site to Pope John Paul II in March 2000, declaring a key excavated from the site to be the "key to the first Vatican." The tell had previously been dismissed by William F. Albright in the 1930s as a potential site for Bethsaida, but Pixner discovered Hellenistic and Roman artefacts while walking through Syrian trenches after the Six-Day War.

== Works ==
- 1986. Glory of Bethlehem. Judson Press. ISBN 0-8170-1109-9
- 1992. With Jesus Through Galilee: According to the Fifth Gospel. Corazin Publishing. ISBN 0-8146-2427-8
- 1996. With Jesus In Jerusalem: His First and Last Days in Judea. Corazin Publishing. ISBN 965-434-004-6
- 1991. Paths of the Messiah And Sites of the Early Church from Galilee to Jerusalem. Ignatius. ISBN 978-0-89870-865-3
