= Kharsan =

Kharsan الخرسان Ras al-Ayn
- Village
- Location in Syria
- Coordinates: 35.295197°N 37.058945°E
- Country: Syria
- Governorate: Hama
- District: Hama
- Subdistrict: Hamraa

Population (2004)
  - Total: 931
- Time zone: UTC+3 (AST)
- City Qrya Pcode: C3067

Kharsa (Arabic: الخرسان; formerly known Ras al-Ayn) is a Syrian village located in the Hamraa Subdistrict of the Hama District in Hama Governorate. According to the Syria Central Bureau of Statistics (CBS), Kharsan had a population of 931 in the 2004 census. Its inhabitants are predominantly Alawites.
