= Cherronesos =

Ancient Greek town in Asia Minor

Cherronesos (Ancient Greek: Χερρόνησος), also Chersonesos (Χερσόνησος), was a town of ancient Caria. It was a member of the Delian League since it appears in tribute records of Athens between 452/1 and 429/8 BCE, paying a phoros of two to three talents. It is also mentioned in a tribute decree of Athens dated to 425/4 BCE. Coins are preserved that have been dated around 500 BCE, bearing the legend «ΧΕΡ»., which are attributed to Cherronesos.

Its site is unlocated.
