= David's Tomb =

Holy site for Abrahamic faiths

King David's Tomb
- קבר דוד המלך (Hebrew) مقام النبي داود (Arabic)
- Makam Nabi Daoud; Cenacle
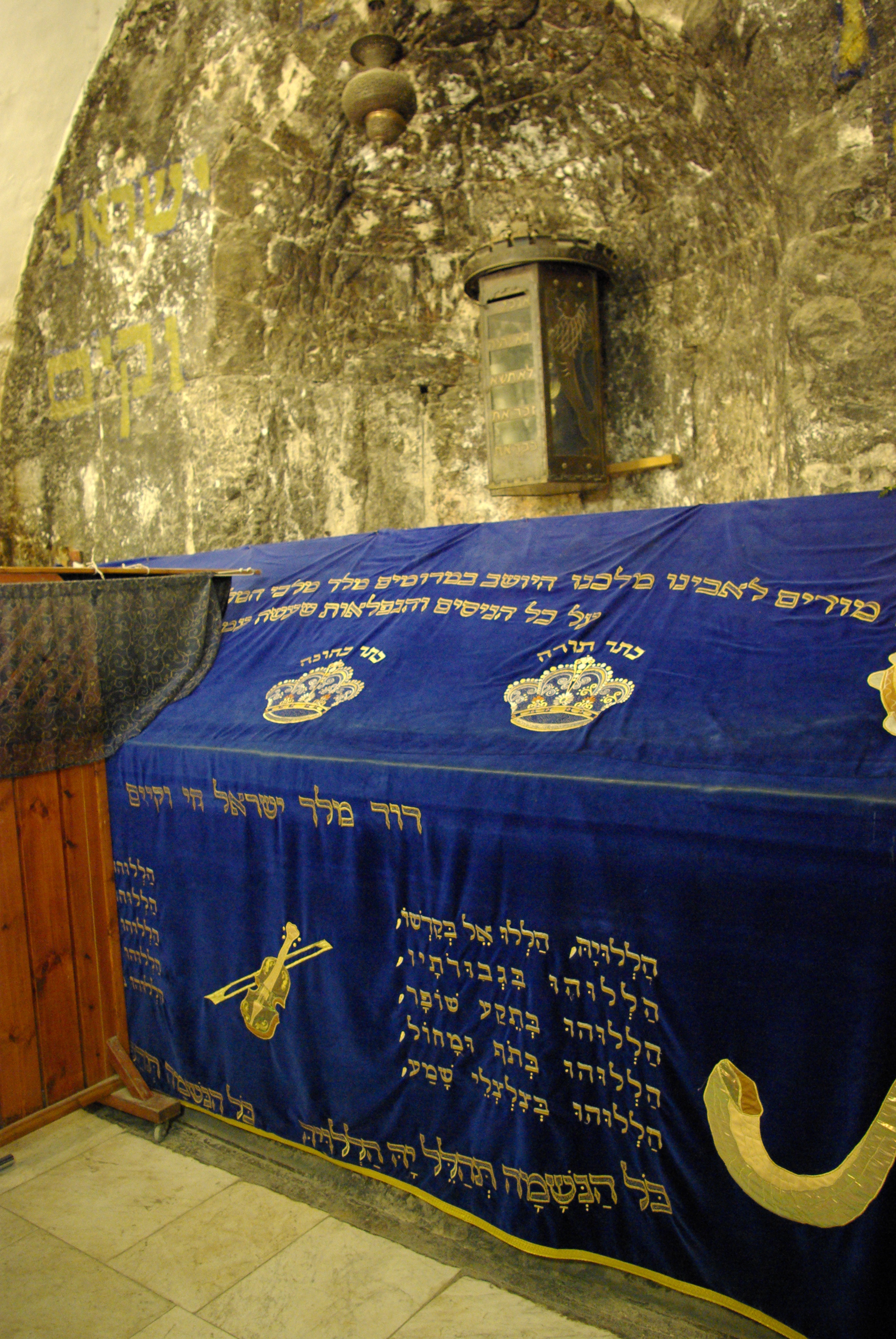

- Shown within Jerusalem
- 31.77170°N 35.22936°E
- Periods: Late Roman, Byzantine, Crusader, Mamluk, Ottoman, Israel
- Location: Jerusalem

Site notes
- Archaeologists: Jacob Pinkerfield
- Public access: yes

David's Tomb (Hebrew: קבר דוד המלך, romanized: Kever David HaMelekh; Arabic: مقام النبي داود, romanized: Maqām al-Nābī Dāwud) is a site that, according to an early medieval (9th century) tradition, is associated with the burial of the biblical king David. During the Ottoman and British Mandate periods, Maqam Al-Nabi Daoud served one of Jerusalem prime Islamic shrines. The building is now administered by the Diaspora Yeshiva Jewish seminary group. Historians, archaeologists and Jewish religious authorities do not consider the site to be the actual resting place of King David.

The compound is located on Mount Zion in Jerusalem, near the Christian Abbey of the Dormition. The compound is thought to be situated in what once was a ground floor corner of the Hagia Zion. (Note: Or according to a minority theory proposed by Pinkerfeld, Bagatti, and Testa, a late Roman-era synagogue.) It occupies the ground floor of a former church, whose upper floor holds the Cenacle or "Upper Room" traditionally identified as the place of Jesus' Last Supper and the original meeting place of the early Christian community of Jerusalem.

Due to Israeli Jews being unable to reach holy sites in the Old City of Jerusalem during the Jordanian annexation of the West Bank (1948–1967), the compound including the Medieval cenotaph of David was promoted as a place of worship. The roof above the Cenacle was sought for its views of the Temple Mount and thus became a symbol of prayer and yearning.

The building’s foundation is the remnant of the Church of Zion. The current building was originally built as a church and later repurposed as a mosque, becoming one of the most important Muslim shrines in Jerusalem. It was split into two immediately following the end of the 1948 Palestine war; the ground floor with the cenotaph was converted into a synagogue, and the Muslim cover on the cenotaph was replaced with an Israeli flag and then a parochet. From then onwards, the Israeli Ministry of Religious Affairs began the process of turning the site into Israel's primary religious site. Jewish prayer was established at the site, and Jewish religious symbols were added. From 1948 until the Six-Day War in 1967 when Israel reclaimed the Western Wall, it was considered the holiest Jewish site in Israel.

Recent years have seen rising tensions between Jewish activists and Christian worshippers at the site.

== History ==
=== Early history ===
The cenotaph is located in a corner of a room situated on the ground floor remains of the former Hagia Zion, considered as an early church or late era synagogue; the upper floor of the same building has traditionally been viewed by Christians as the "Cenacle" or "Upper Room", the site of the Last Supper.

The actual site of David's burial is unknown, though the Hebrew Bible states that David was buried in the City of David. In the 4th century CE, he and his father Jesse were believed to be buried in Bethlehem. The idea that David was entombed on what was later called Mt Zion dates to the 9th century CE.

Zion, the place conquered by David according to the Books of Samuel, was wrongly ascribed by medieval pilgrims to this site, and from then on David was presumed to be buried there.

=== Crusader and Franciscan control ===
Writing around 1173, the Jewish traveller Benjamin of Tudela recounted a colourful story that two Jewish workers employed to dig a tunnel came across David's original splendid palace, replete with gold crown and scepter and decided that the site must be his tomb.

The Gothic cenotaph preserved to this day is the work of the Crusaders.

In 1332 the Franciscans, the officials representatives of the Roman Catholic church in the Holy Places after the final Muslim expulsion of the Crusaders, moved their headquarters to the Cenacle, having acquired it in 1332 from Sultan An-Nasir Muhammad for 30,000 ducats.

=== Mosque ===
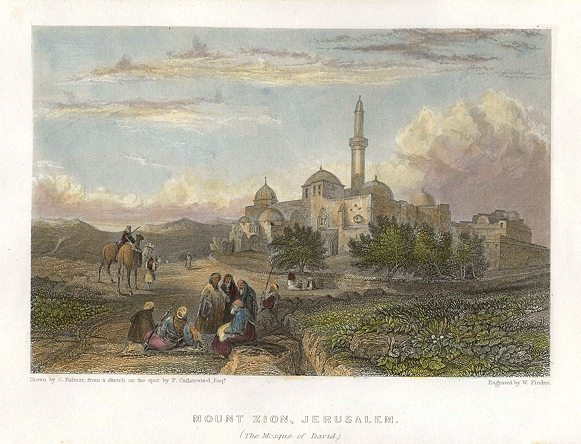
1836 sketch by Frederick Catherwood, Mount Zion, Jerusalem (the Mosque of David)

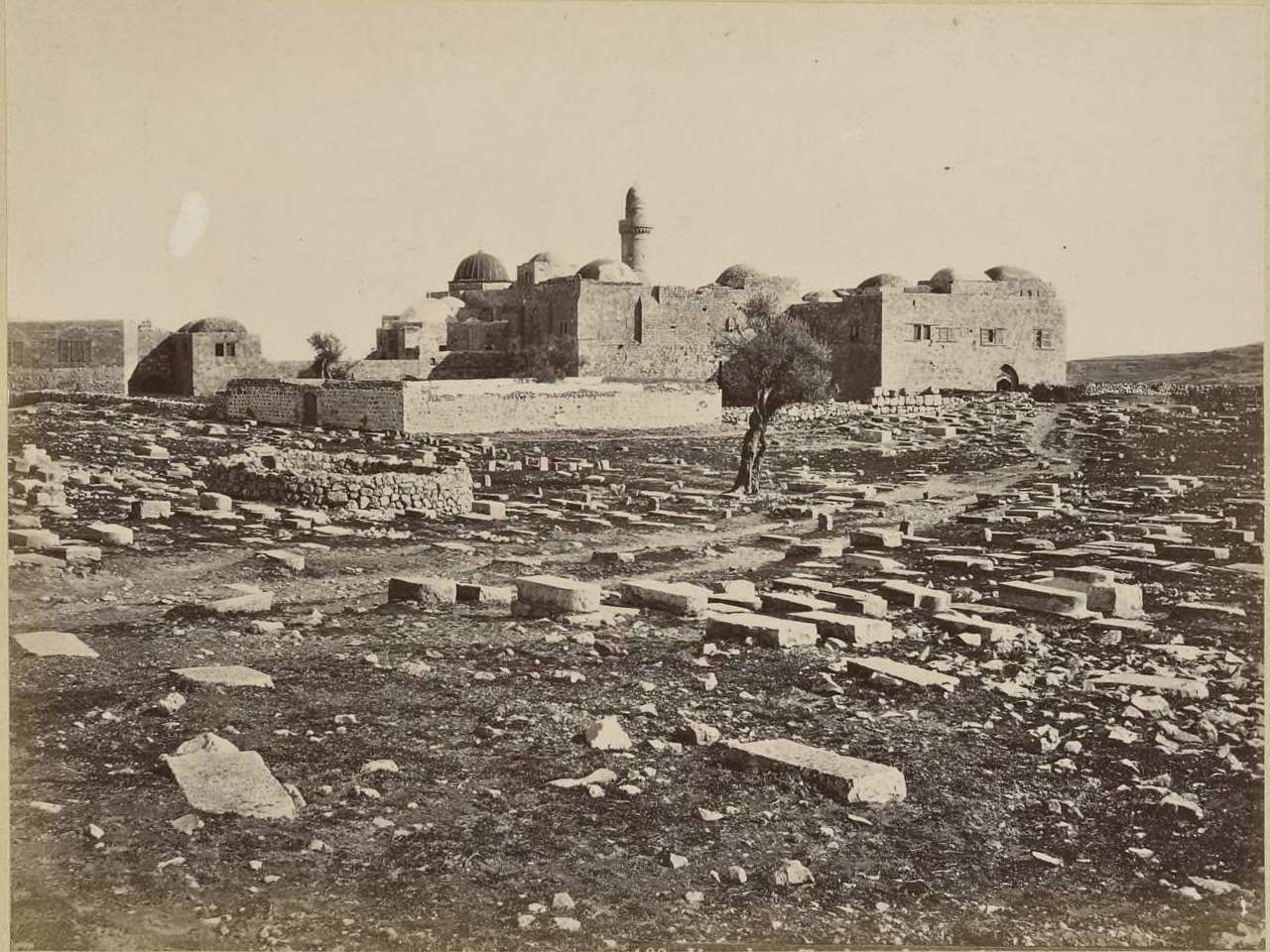
1878 photo by Felix Bonfils, Tombeau de David et Cénacle, Jérusalem

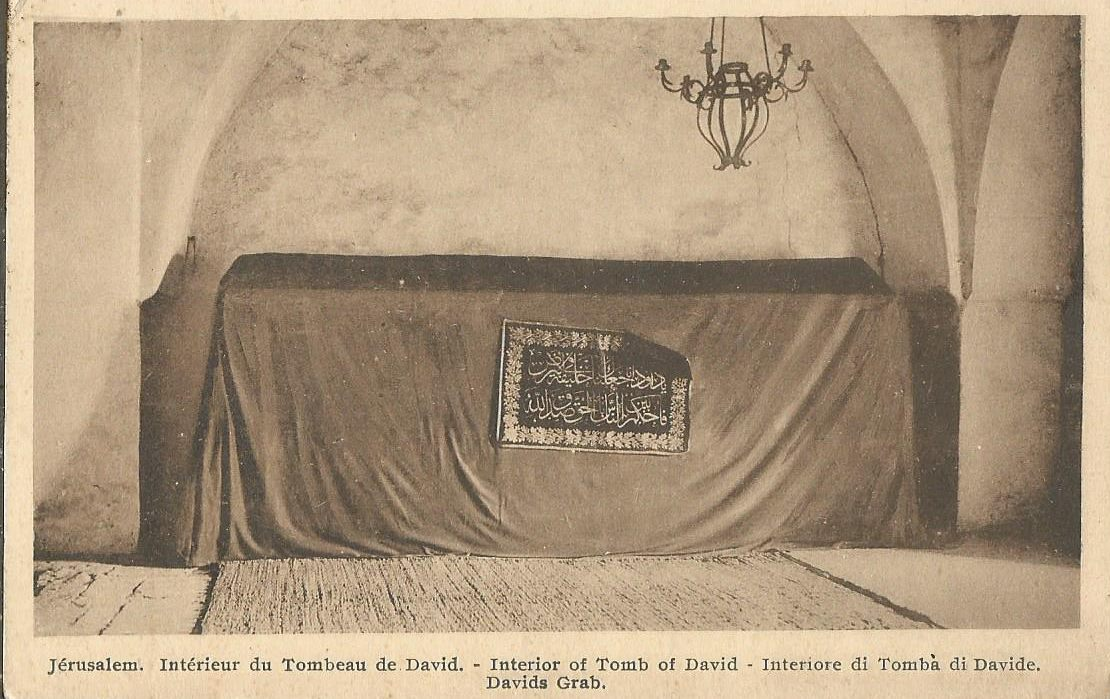
Early 1900s postcard showing the cenotaph with its Islamic silk covering

==== Lower floor (tomb) ====
According to Dominican pilgrim Felix Fabri, in 1429 Mamluk Sultan Barsbay took part of the lower floor of the complex away from the Franciscans and converted the tomb chamber into a mosque. Though it was returned a year later, possession alternated back and forth until 1523, during the reign of Ottoman Sultan Suleiman the Magnificent, when Muslim authorities expelled the Franciscans from the entire building.

==== Upper floor (Cenacle) and Franciscan convent ====
After the 1523 expulsion, the "chapel of the Holy Spirit" (the Cenacle) was transformed into a mosque, as witnessed by a 1524 inscription on its east wall. With the 1536–41 rebuilding of Jerusalem's walls by Suleiman, Mount Zion was again left outside the city.

In 1551 the Franciscans were ejected from the premises of their entire Mount Zion convent, possibly on account of an old 12th-century rumour that Christian workmen had discovered the Tombs of David and Solomon and the other kings of Judah. With time, their properties on Mount Zion were progressively expropriated by the sheikh of the now Muslim shrine of Nabi Da'ud. Sometime between 1600 and 1639 a domed maqam was built over the former "chapel of the Holy Spirit", and only from 1831 onwards were the Franciscans allowed to hold mass there on Maundy Thursday and Pentecost. Muslim control of the site continued until 1948, when Israel placed it under the authority of the Ministry of Religious Affairs.

==== Status during British Mandate ====
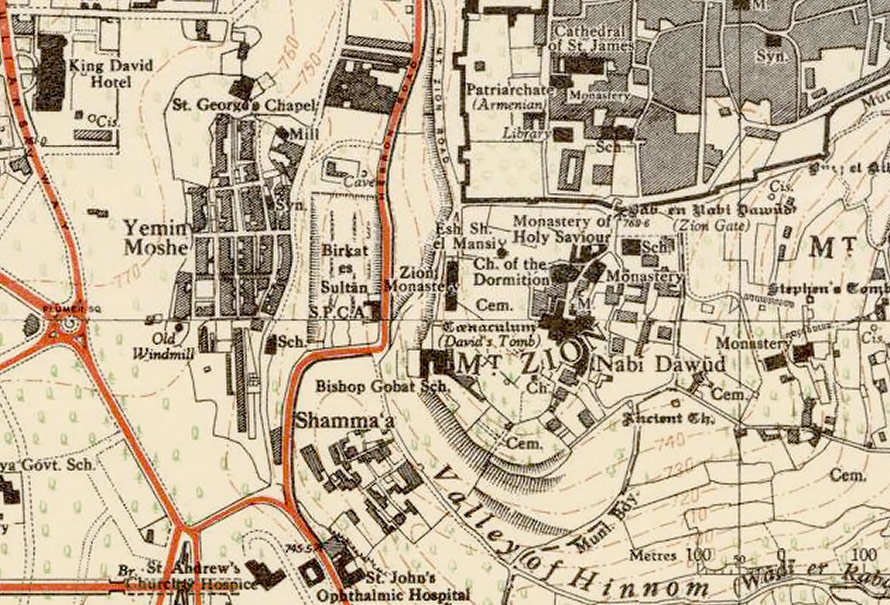
Mount Zion district in 1946

During the British Mandate period, the site was not subject to the Status Quo of Holy Land sites since it was considered to be "absolutely under the authority of the Moslem Waqf of Nebi Daud, who however arrange to open it to the many that are anxious to visit a site of such sacred traditions".

=== Israeli control and 1953–54 UN dispute ===
After the 1948 Arab–Israeli War, the southern part of Mount Zion upon which the Tomb stands ended up on the Israel side of the Green Line. Between 1948 and 1967, the eastern part of the Old City was occupied by Jordan, which barred entry to Jews even for the purpose of praying at Jewish holy sites. Jewish pilgrims went to David's Tomb and climbed to the rooftop to pray. Since 1949, a blue cloth with basic modernist ornamentation has been placed over the sarcophagus. The images on the cloth include several crown-shaped Torah finials placed over Torah scrolls, and a violin, and the cloth also features several pieces of text written in Hebrew. The building is now part of the Diaspora yeshiva.

Between 1953 and 1954 a dispute arose over the site at the United Nations. In October 1953, Husayn Khalidi, the Jordanian foreign minister and a previous Mayor of Jerusalem wrote to Moshe Sharett via the United Nations about David's Tomb:

Israel's flagrant defiance of all United Nations decisions now crowned by a further serious breach of the status quo governing the Holy Places of Jerusalem upheld by Turkish, Mandatory and Jordan regimes. Photographic confirmation now in hand proves beyond doubt Israel's conversion of the Moslem holy mosque Nebi Daoud Cenaculum into a Jewish synagogue.

He demanded immediate United Nations intervention; Iraq sent a similar message in December. In February 1954, Israel replied:

Since the establishment of the State of Israel, no architectural, religious or other changes have been made in the Coenaculum room, where the Nabi Daoud is situated, and access thereto is accorded to all visitors in strict accordance with the status quo. No applications by Moslems to visit the place has been refused.

=== Recent events ===
In December 2012, unknown persons completely destroyed a large number of 17th-century Islamic tiles in the tomb; the Israel Antiquities Authority has decided not to reconstruct them.

A statue of King David, installed on Mount Zion in 2008 near the compound by the Russian Charitable Foundation of St. Nicholas the Wonderworker, was dismantled in 2018. The statue had previously been vandalized several times. The installation of the monument in the old section of the city was negatively received by many representatives of the ultra-Orthodox Jewish community.

== Question of authenticity ==
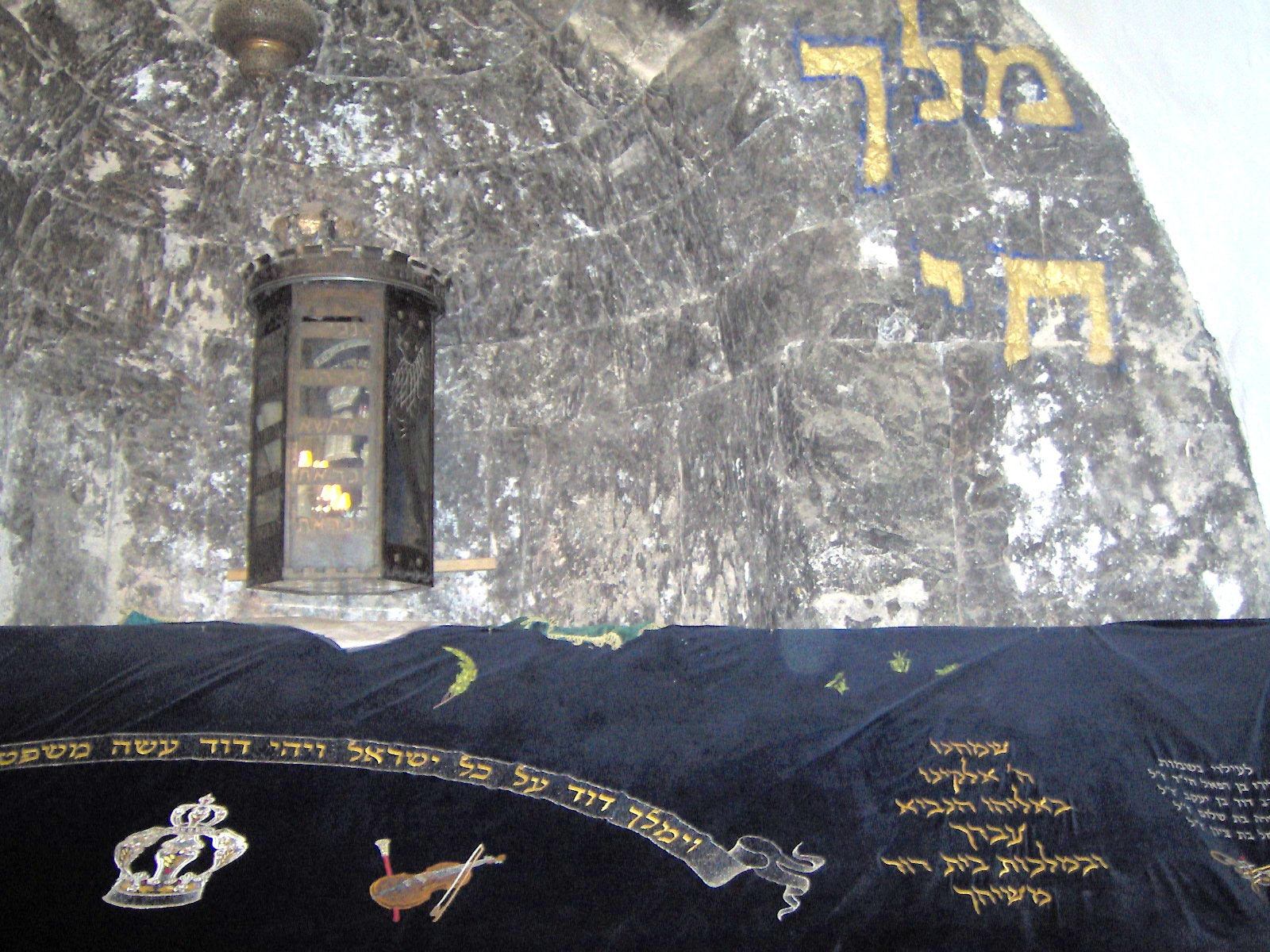
King David's cenotaph in 2006

=== Earlier traditions ===
The compound is not considered to be the authentic resting place of King David. According to the Hebrew Bible (Old Testament of Christianity), David was actually buried within the City of David together with "his forefathers". This practice repeated itself during the First Temple period – according to the Books of Kings, most of the Judean kings of the House of David were buried "with their fathers" in the City of David. It is also said that Jehoiada the priest was buried among the kings. The Book of Chronicles adds a secondary distinction, stating that some of the kings, such as Ahaziah and Joash were buried in the City of David, but not in the "tombs of the kings".

During the Second Temple period, the tombs of the House of David were still known. They are mentioned in the Book of Nehemiah as a well-known landmark in Jerusalem. The Apostle Peter specifically referred to the location of David's tomb as commonly-known in his sermon on the day of Pentecost. According to the first century Jewish-Roman historian Josephus, Herod the Great tried to loot the Tomb of David, but discovered that someone else had already done so before him. Elsewhere, in Wars of the Jews, Josephus says that John Hyrcanus took three thousand talents from David's tomb in order to defend Jerusalem against Antiochus VII Sidetes. The genuine David's Tomb is unlikely to contain any furnishings of value.

According to the Tosefta, "the graves of the House of David [...] were in Jerusalem and no one had ever touched them."

The 4th-century Pilgrim of Bordeaux reports that he discovered David to be buried in Bethlehem, in a vault that also contained the tombs of Ezekiel, Jesse, Solomon, Job, and Asaph, with those names carved into the tomb walls.

=== "Zion": three consecutive locations ===
==== Jebusite fortress ====
According to the Book of Samuel, Mount Zion was the site of the Jebusite fortress called the "stronghold of Zion" that was conquered by King David, becoming his palace and the City of David. It is mentioned in the Book of Isaiah (60:14), the Book of Psalms, and the first book of the Maccabees (c. 2nd century BCE).

==== Temple Mount ====
After the conquest of the Jebusite city, located on the ridge west of the Kidron Valley, the ridge's highest part, in the north, became the site of Solomon's Temple. Based on archaeological excavations revealing sections of the First Temple city wall, this is believed to have received the name Mount Zion.

==== Western hill ====
Towards the end of the First Temple period, the city expanded westward. Just before the Roman conquest of Jerusalem and the destruction of the Second Temple, Josephus described Mount Zion as a hill across the city's central valley to the west. This indicates that the western hill by then had come to be known as Mount Zion, and this has been the case ever since. It must however be said that Josephus never used the name "Mount Zion" in any of his writings, but described the "Citadel" of king David as being situated on the higher and longer hill, thus pointing at the Western Hill as what the Bible calls Mount Zion.

=== Early synagogue: pro and con ===
The 4th-century accounts of the Bordeaux Pilgrim, Optatus of Milevus, and Epiphanius of Salamis all record that seven synagogues had once stood on Mount Zion. By 333 CE (a date defined by some as the end of the Roman period and beginning of the Byzantine period), only one of them remained, but no association with David's tomb is mentioned.

One fringe theory claims that at the end of the Roman period, a synagogue called Hagiya Zion was built at the entrance of the structure known as David's Tomb, probably based on the belief that David brought the Ark of the Covenant here from Beit Shemesh and Kiryat Ye'arim before the construction of the Temple.

Jacob Pinkerfeld, the archaeologist who has worked on part of the site, has also suggested that "David's Tomb" was actually a 2nd-century, late-Roman synagogue.

The identification of David's Tomb as a synagogue has been thoroughly challenged due to the absence of typical synagogal architectural characteristics including (original) columns, benches, or similar accoutrements. The presence of a niche in the original foundation walls, thought by a few to be evidence of a Torah niche, has been refuted by many scholars as being too large and too high (8' x 8') to have served this purpose.

=== Source of the tradition ===
==== David's Tomb ====
According to Professor Doron Bar,

Although the sources for the tradition of David's Tomb on Mount Zion are not clear, it appears that it only began to take root during the subsequent, early Muslim period. Apparently, the Christians inherited this belief from the Muslims, and only at a relatively late juncture in the city's history were the Jews finally convinced as well.

Others disagree. The facility was under the control of Greek Christians at this time. It was, indeed, shortly before the Crusades at the earliest that the location of David's Tomb can be traced to Mount Zion. But the first literary reference to the tomb being on Mount Zion can be found in the tenth-century Vita Constantini (Life of Constantine). Ora Limor attributes the localizing of the tomb on Mount Zion to the tenth-century transition from the liturgical celebration of the "founding fathers" of Jerusalem, King David, the founder of the dynasty and capital city, and James, brother of Jesus, the founder of the "mother of all churches" on Mount Sion, to the belief that their tombs were actually located at the site where the liturgy was held–a case of "consolidation", from "abstract foundation myth... into the physical tradition of the tomb."

Limor quotes Muslim traveller Mas'udi, who in 943 wrote about Muslim traditions that placed the tomb of David in the Aleppo region of Syria and in eastern Lebanon. Having initially revered David's tomb in Bethlehem, Muslims began to venerate it on Mount Zion instead but no earlier than the 10th century following the Christian (and possibly Jewish) lead.

In the twelfth century, Jewish pilgrim Benjamin of Tudela recounted a somewhat fanciful tale of workmen accidentally discovering the tomb of David on Mount Zion, in which he used details from Josephus Flavius's narrative about the attempt by Herod the Great to rob the tomb.

==== Upper Room and first church ====
Epiphanius' 4th-century account in his Weights and Measures is one of the first to associate the location with the original meeting place of the Christian faith, writing that there stood "the church of God, which was small, where the disciples, when they had returned after the Savior had ascended from the Mount of Olives, went to the upper room".

== Exploration ==
In the mid-nineteenth century, engineer and amateur archaeologist Ermete Pierotti reported discovering a cavern beneath the grounds of the Byzantine and Crusader churches on Mount Zion which he suspected extended to beneath the Tomb of David. A limited exploration revealed human remains within a huge vault supported by piers. The cavern has yet to be confirmed or scientifically excavated.

In 1951, archaeologist Jacob Pinkerfeld worked in the lower parts of the structure and interpreted them as being the remains of a synagogue which, in his opinion, had later been used as a church by Judeo-Christians.

== Alternative burial sites ==
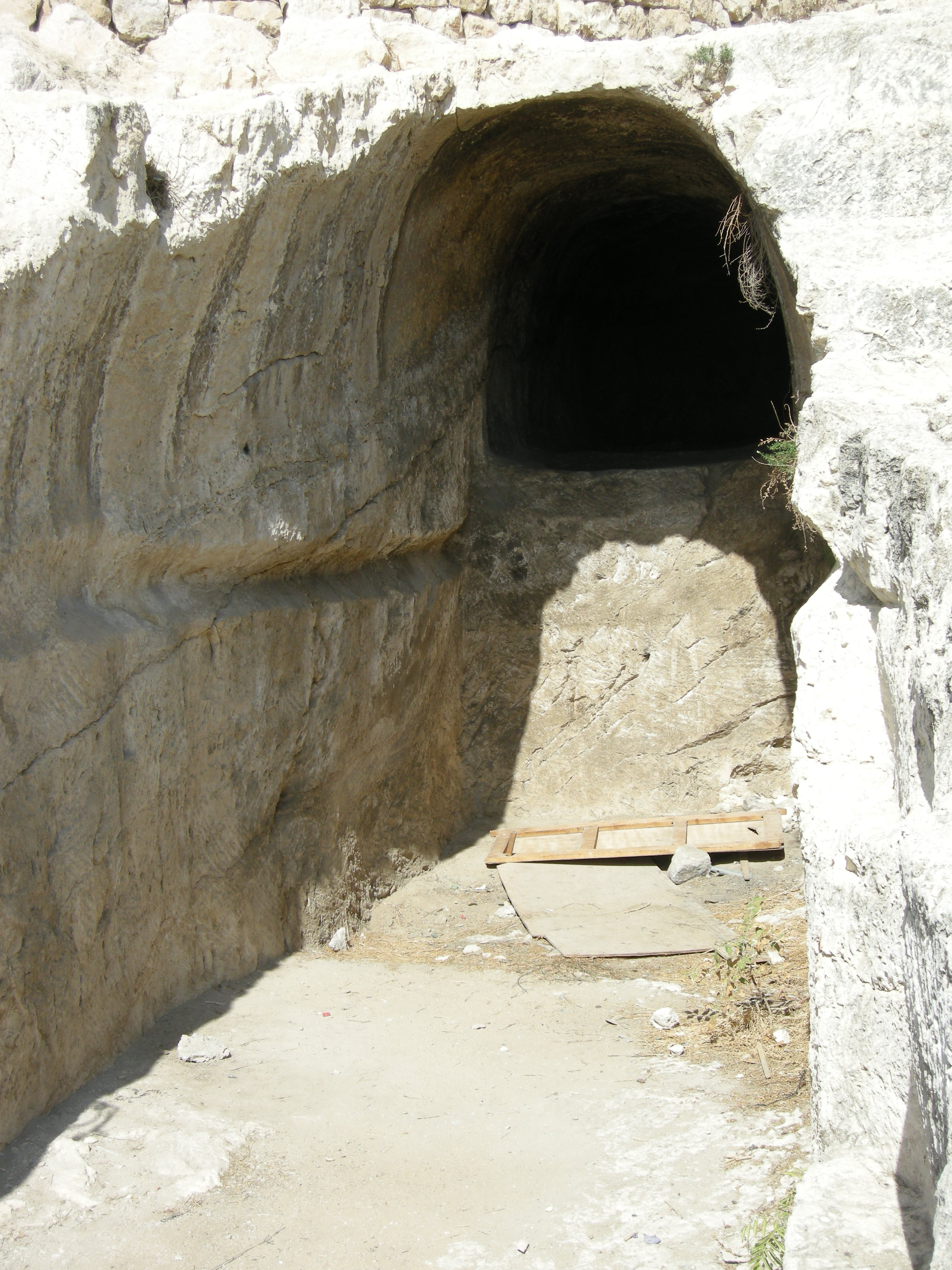
Tomb T1, identified by Shanks as the possible tomb of David.

Archaeologists, doubting the Mount Zion location and favouring the biblical account, have since the early 20th century sought the actual tomb in the City of David area. In 1913, Raymond Weill found eight elaborate tombs at the south of the City of David, which archaeologists have subsequently interpreted as strong candidates for the burial locations of the former kings of the city; Hershel Shanks, for example, argues that the most ornate of these (officially labelled T1) is precisely where one would expect to find the burial site mentioned in the Bible.

== See also ==
- Church of Zion, Jerusalem or Church of the Apostles on Mount Zion, Roman-era church or synagogue speculated to have belonged to an early Jewish-Christian congregation
- List of burial places of biblical figures
- Uzziah Tablet, artifact possibly indicating a reburial of King Uzziah's remains
