= Coenaculum =

Coenaculum is the term applied to the eating-room of a Roman house in which the supper (coena) or latest meal was taken. It was sometimes placed in an upper storey and reached by an external staircase.

The Last Supper in the New Testament was taken in the coenaculum, the large upper room cited in St. Mark (xiv.15) and St. Luke (xxii.12).

== Cenacle of the Pallottines ==
Saint Vincenzo Pallotti painted the meeting of the early Jerusalem community. The Pallottine community understands the "coenaculum" primarily as the Upper Room and this in turn as a symbol that all Christians, all baptized men and women — i.e. with and without special consecration – were sent out with the Spirit of God, i.e. to follow Christ are to set out and be apostles. The Pallottines in Constance also use the term coenaculum to refer to their "house of silence and contemplative prayer", i.e. a meeting place.

== See also ==
- Cenacle
