= Abbey of the Dormition =

Catholic abbey in Mount Zion, Jerusalem, Israel

Coordinates: 31.7722°N 35.2289°E

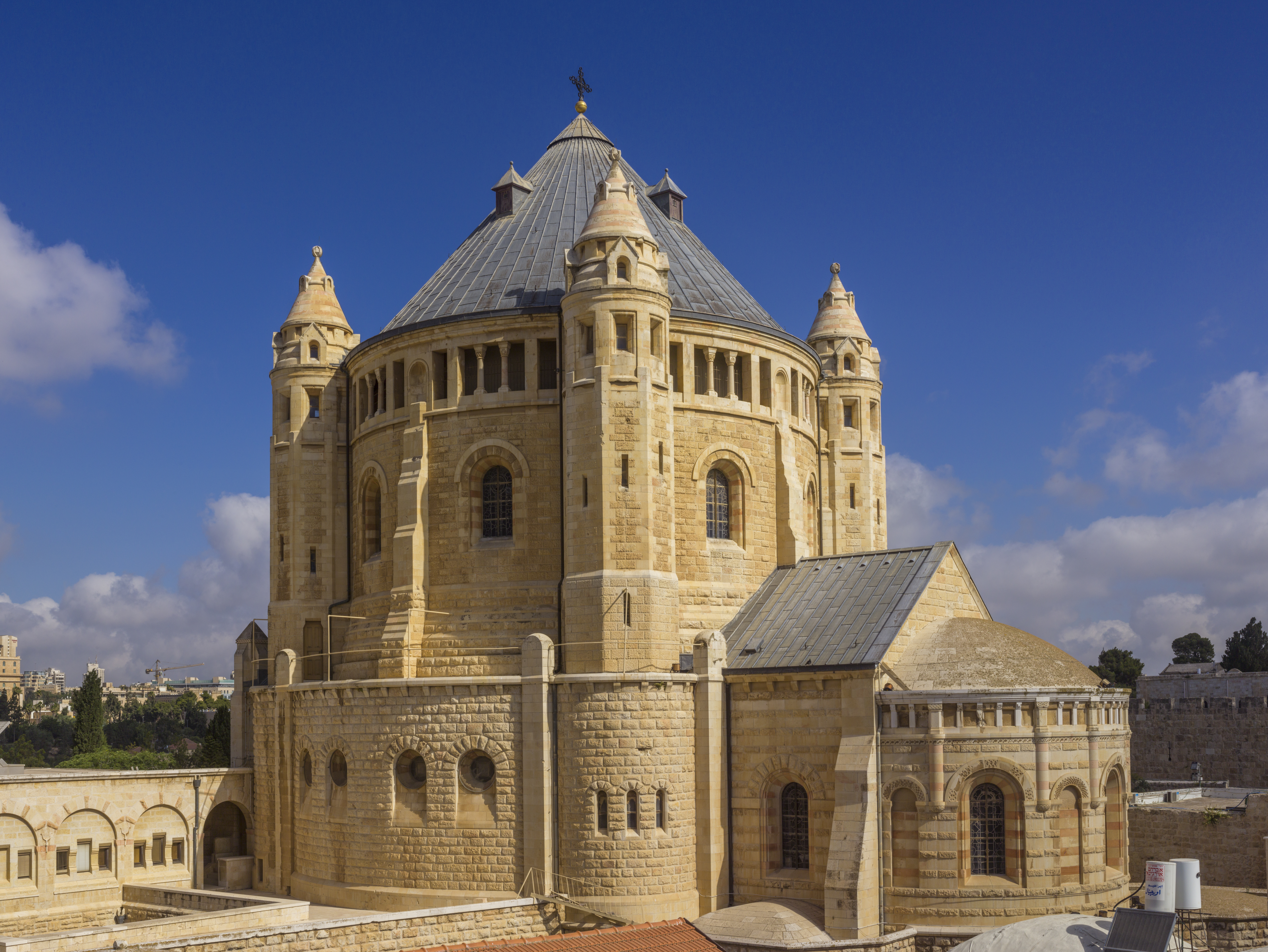

- Location within Old City of Jerusalem

Monastery information
- Order: Benedictine
- Established: Early 5th century
- Dedication: Dormition of the Mother of God

People
- Abbot: Nikodemus Schnabel

Architecture
- Functional status: Active
- Style: Romanesque Revival

Site
- Location: Jerusalem
- Public access: yes
- Website: dormitio.net

Abbey of the Dormition (German: Dormitio-Abtei, Hebrew: כנסיית הדורמיציון Knesiyat HaDormitsiyon, Arabic: كنيسة رقاد السيدة العذراء) is a Catholic abbey belonging to the Benedictine Order in Jerusalem, on Mount Zion, just outside the walls of the Old City near the Zion Gate. The abbey is said to mark the spot where the Virgin Mary ended her life on earth.

== History of creation ==
The Byzantine basilica Hagia Sion was built under John II, Bishop of Jerusalem in the early 5th century. Relics attributed to Saint Stephen were transferred to the church on 26 December 415. The church is shown in the 6th-century Madaba Map. It was destroyed in the 614 sack of Jerusalem by Sasanian king Khosrau II.

Its foundations were recovered in 1899, when the architect and construction manager of the Diocese of Cologne, Heinrich Renard (1868–1928), investigated the site. Bargil Pixner proposed the theory of a pre-Crusader Church of Zion, the continuation of an early Judeo-Christian congregation and their house of worship, which he located on the Madaba Map next to the Hagia Sion basilica.

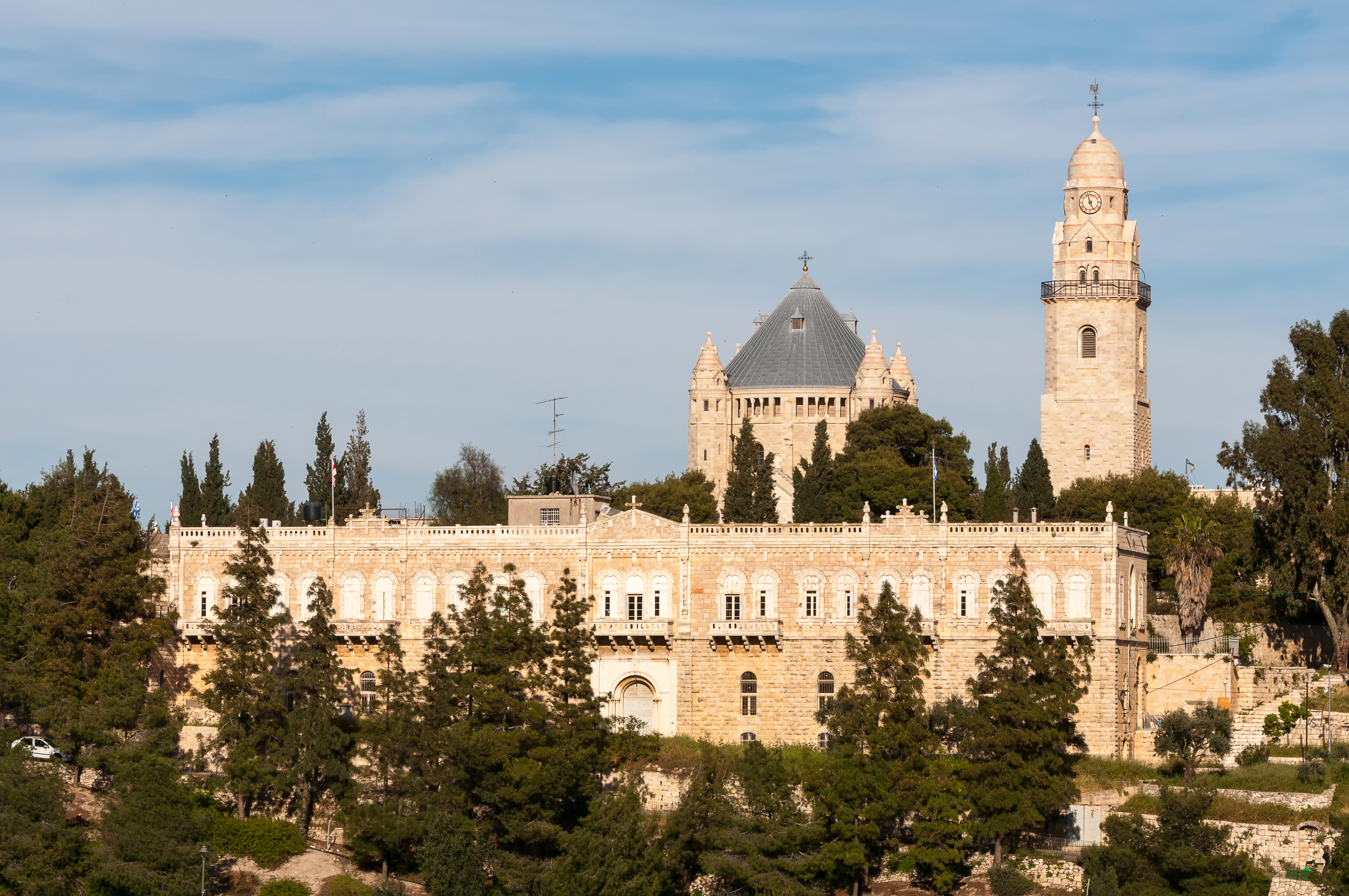
Dormition Abbey behind Greek Hagias Zion Convent

A monastic order known as the Abbey of Our Lady of Mount Zion was established at the site in the 12th century, with a church built on the ruins of the earlier demolished Byzantine church. The 12th century church was again destroyed in the 13th century, and the monks moved to Sicily. The order was eventually absorbed into the Jesuits in 1617 (the Congregation of Notre-Dame de Sion is an unrelated monastic order, founded in 1843).

== Modern building ==
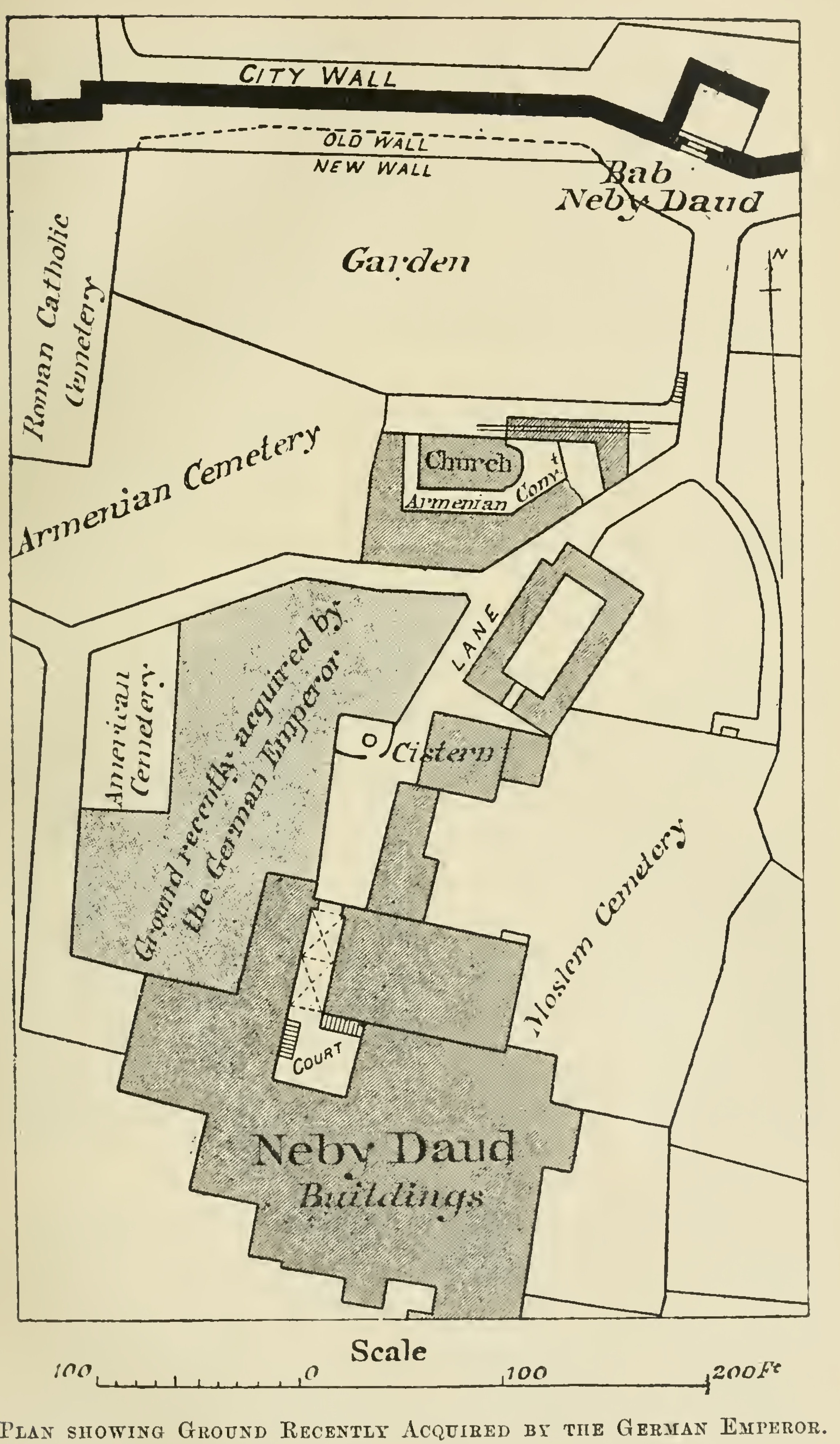
Conrad Schick's diagram of the land acquired in 1898 for the construction, during the visit of Kaiser Wilhelm

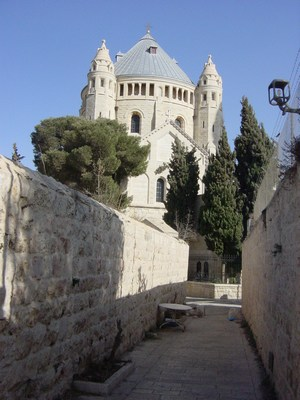
Exterior of the church

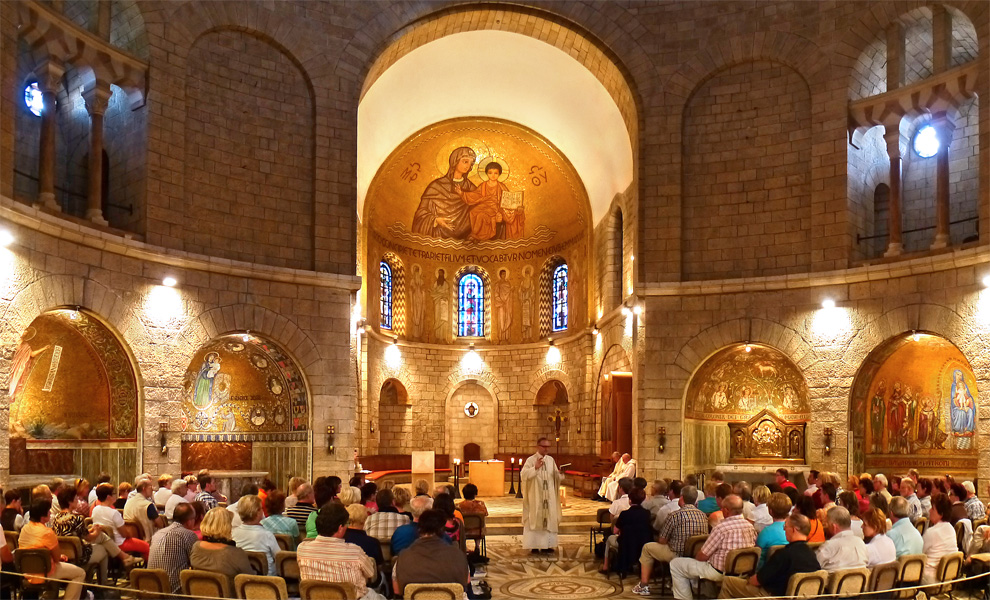
Interior of the church

During his visit to Jerusalem in 1898 for the dedication of the Lutheran Church of the Redeemer, Kaiser Wilhelm II bought this piece of land on Mount Zion for 120,000 German Goldmark from Sultan Abdul Hamid II and presented it to the "German Association of the Holy Land" ("de:Deutscher Verein vom Heiligen Lande").

Conrad Schick reported about the event, describing the acquired plot of land and showing confidence that the remains of the ancient Zion Church would be discovered under the accumulated dirt.

According to local tradition, it was on this spot, near the site of the Last Supper, that the Blessed Virgin Mary ended her life on earth. Since the Catholic dogma of the Assumption of Mary teaches that Christ's mother was taken, body and soul, to heaven, she did not die, but "fell asleep" – therefore the monastery's name. The church itself is called Basilica of the Assumption (or Dormition).

Renard delivered the designs and plans for the Abbey, the direction of construction was entrusted to the architect Theodor Sandel, a member of the Temple Society and a resident of Jerusalem. The cornerstone was laid on 7 October 1900. Construction was completed in only ten years; the basilica was dedicated on 10 April 1910 by the Latin Patriarch of Jerusalem. The abbey was built in the neo-Romanesque style that had become representative of Imperial Germany.

The present church is a circular building with several niches containing altars, and a choir. Two spiral staircases lead to the crypt, the site ascribed to the Dormition of the Virgin Mary, and also to the organ-loft and the gallery, from where two of the church's four towers are accessible.

== Benedictine community ==
The first monks had already been sent to Jerusalem in 1906 from Beuron Archabbey in Germany. They were interned for the first time in 1918–1921, after the end of World War I. In 1926 the monastery was raised to the status of an abbey within the Beuron Congregation. Between 1939 and 1945, the German monks were disbanded a second time, and then a third as the result of the 1948 Arab-Israeli War. The abbey was located in the Israeli-controlled territory on Mount Zion, across from the Jordanian-controlled territory within the walled city.

In 1951, the abbey was separated from the Beuron Congregation and placed under the direct supervision of the Abbot-Primate of the Benedictines in Rome.

In 2012 the Dormition Abbey ceased to be under the direct supervision of the Abbot-Primate and entered the Congregation of the Annunciation.

== Theology seminar ==
Since 1973 the abbey has been hosting an ecumenical year of study for students of theology from Germany, Austria, and Switzerland. The curriculum encompasses biblical, Eastern Orthodox Church, Judaic, and Islamic studies.

== Vandalism ==
The Dormition Abbey, along with other Christian sites, has been the target of occasional vandalism as a form of "price tag" terrorism by extremist Israeli nationalist religious youths. In October 2012 and in May and June 2013 the abbey was vandalized with anti-Christian graffiti and insults in Hebrew. Two cars were also covered with graffiti and all tyres were slashed.

On 26 May 2014 a box of wooden crosses was set ablaze inside the Dormition Abbey. It is believed that this was some sort of failed arson attempt. At the same time of the arson attempt, Pope Francis was conducting a service in the building next door in the Cenacle two floors above the room of King David's Tomb.

A vandal entered the premises by jumping over a fence in December 2014 and went on to damage a crucifix, a bench, and a number of statues in the cemetery, one of which marked the grave of a monk with Israeli nationality.

In January 2016, vandals wrote slogans on the walls of the Abbey such as "Death to the heathen Christians, the enemies of Israel" and "May his name be obliterated" (whose first letters in Hebrew spell the name of Jesus).

== Gallery ==
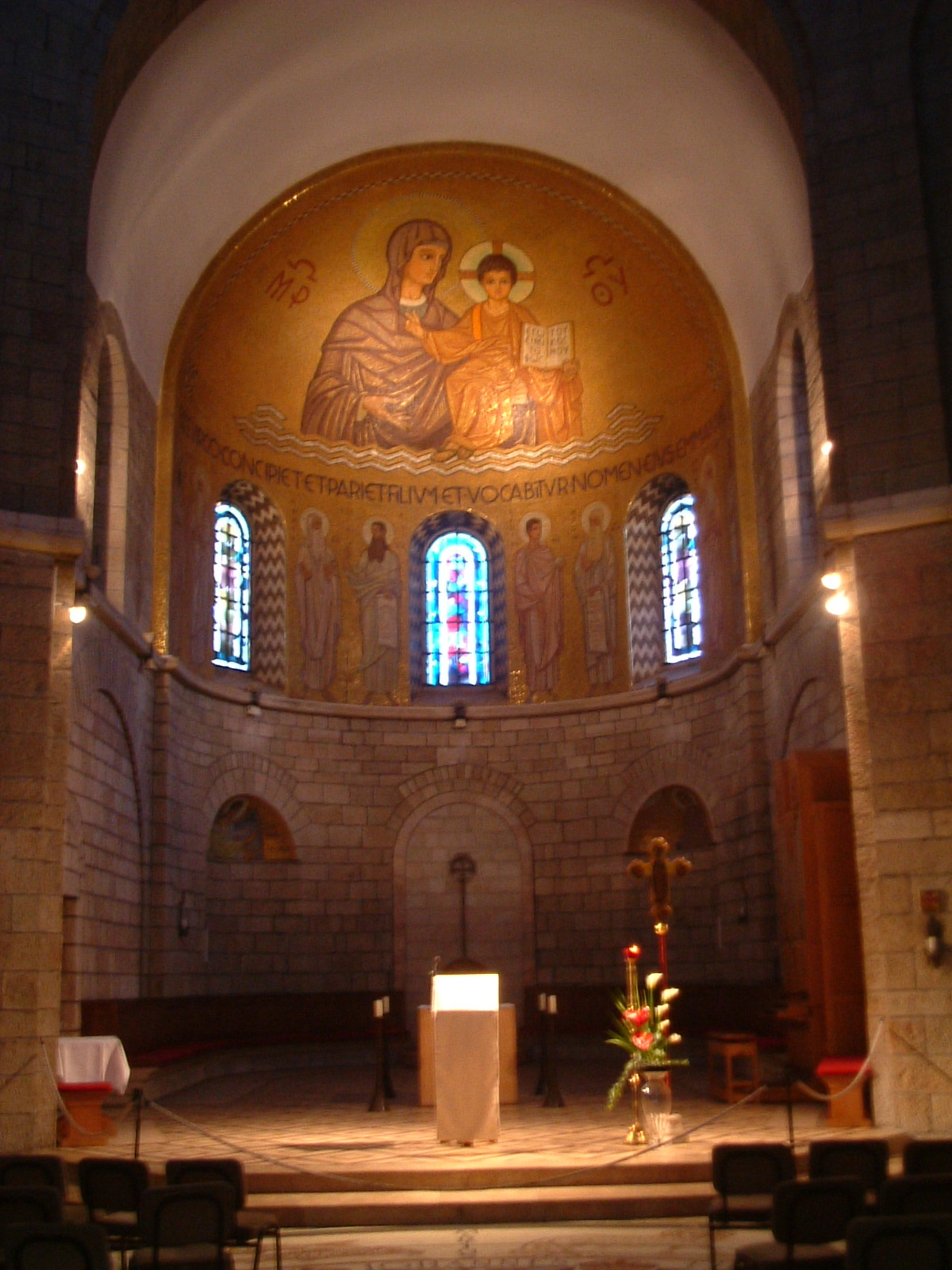
Inside the Church of Dormition

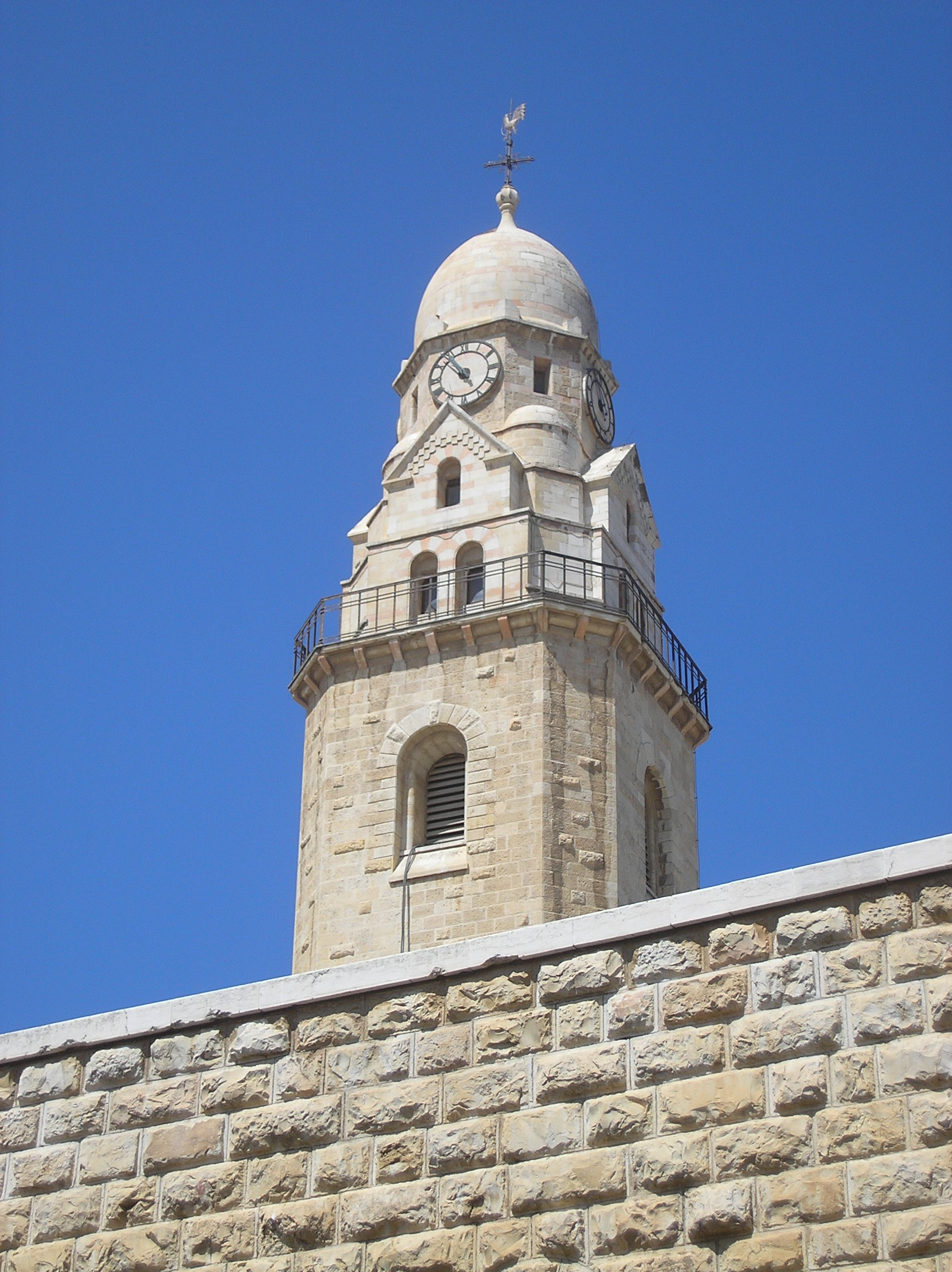
Bell Tower

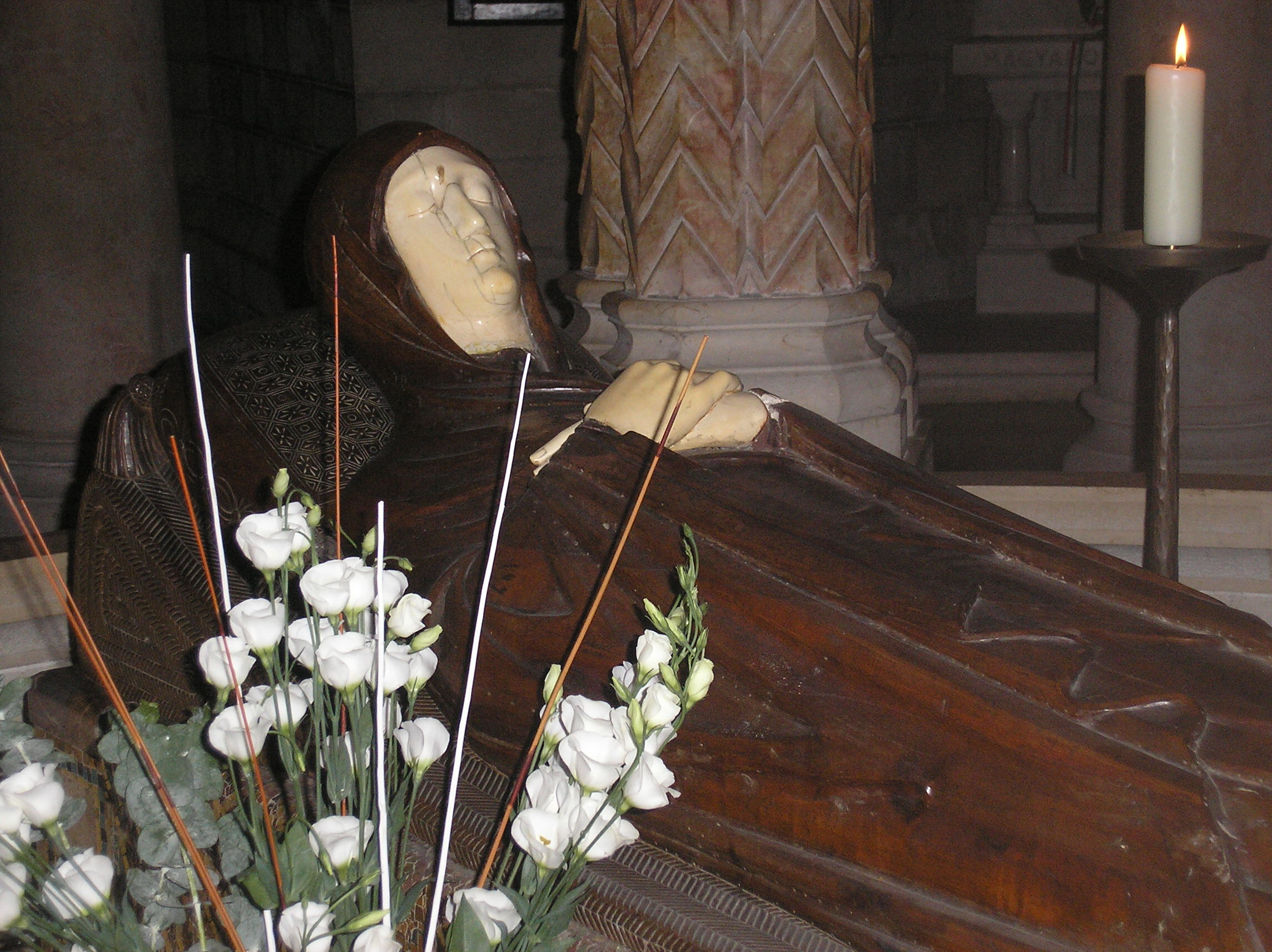
The place where Mary was assumed into heaven, according to Christian tradition.

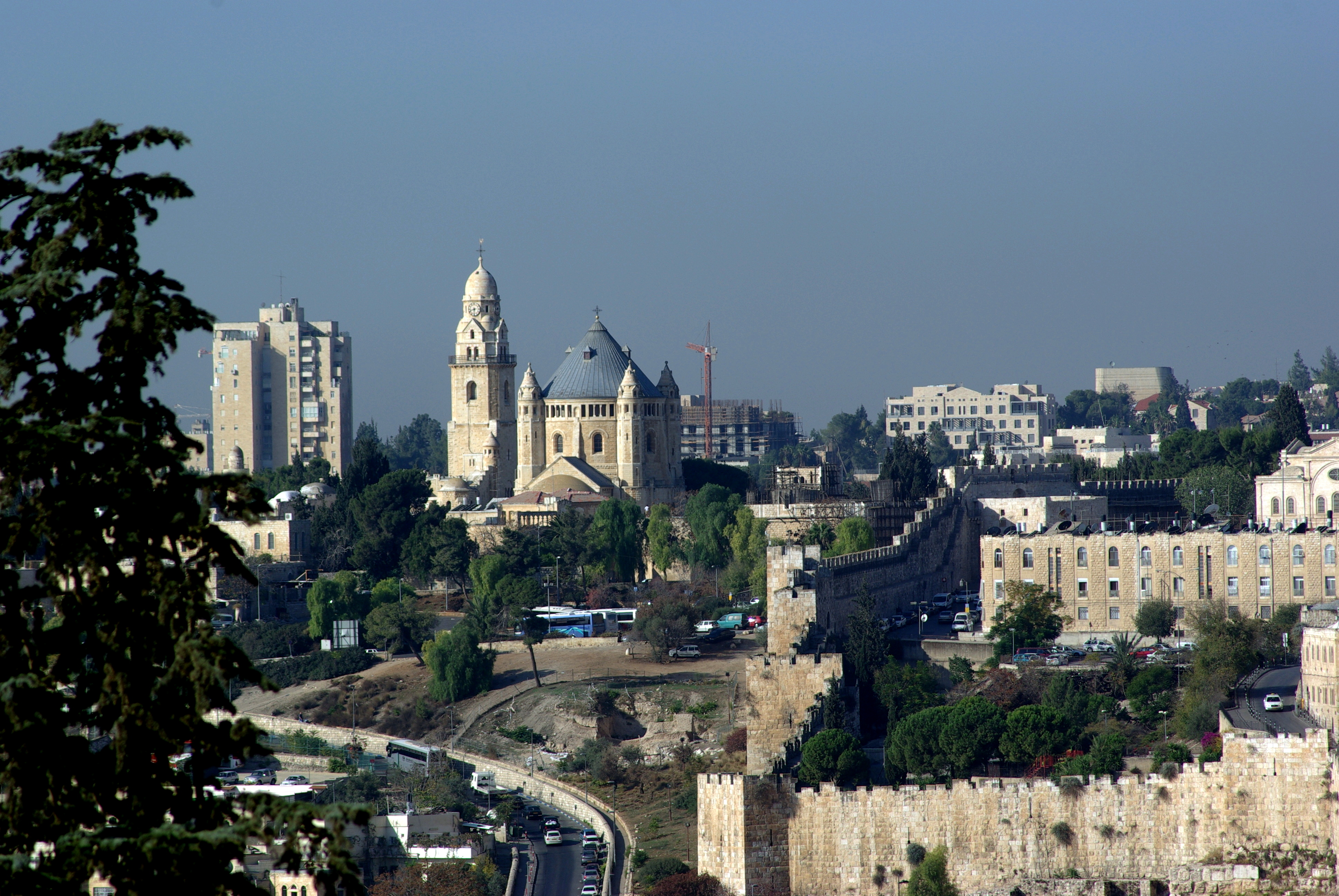
View from Mount of Olives

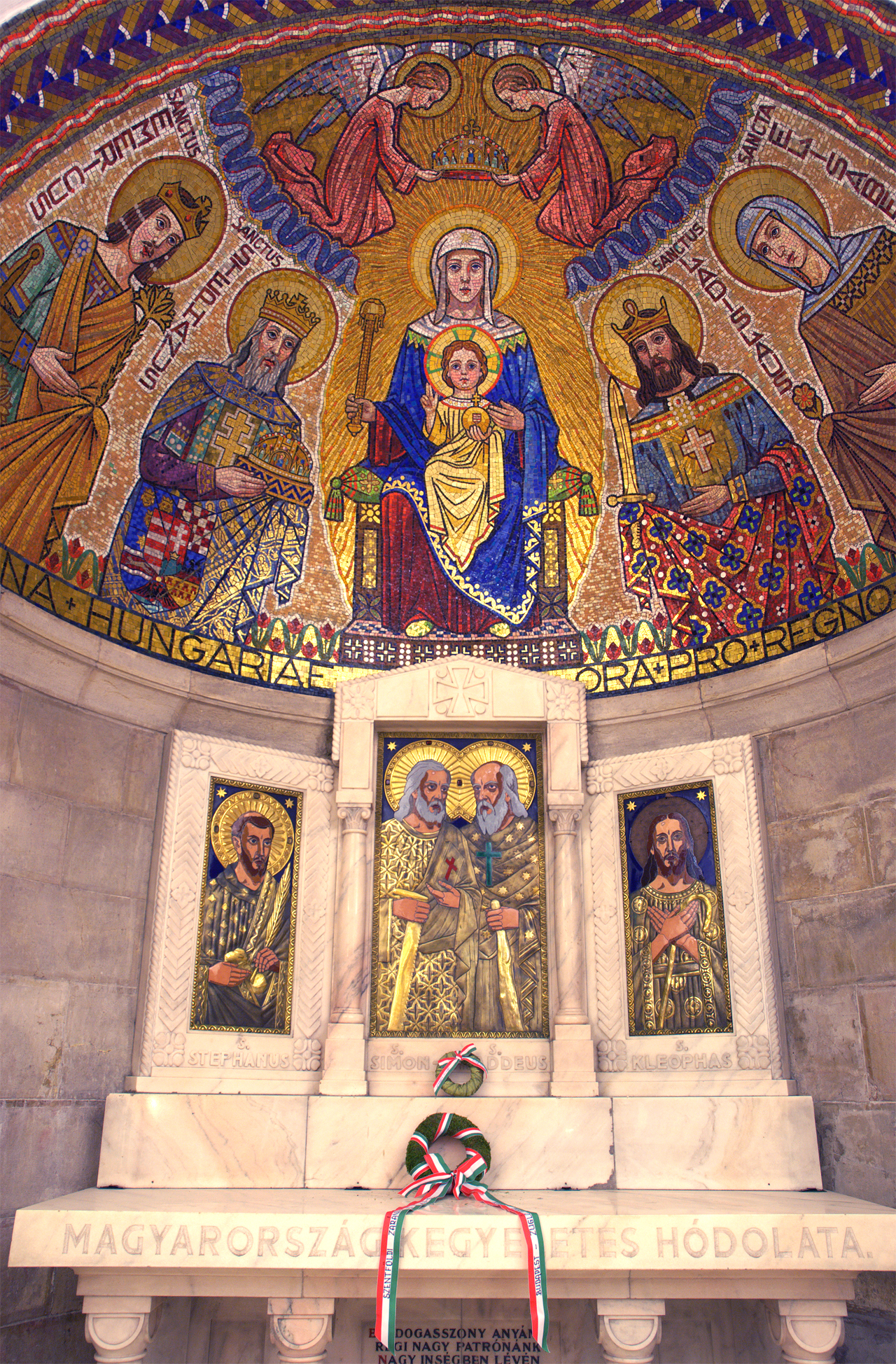
The Hungarian Chapel in the crypt

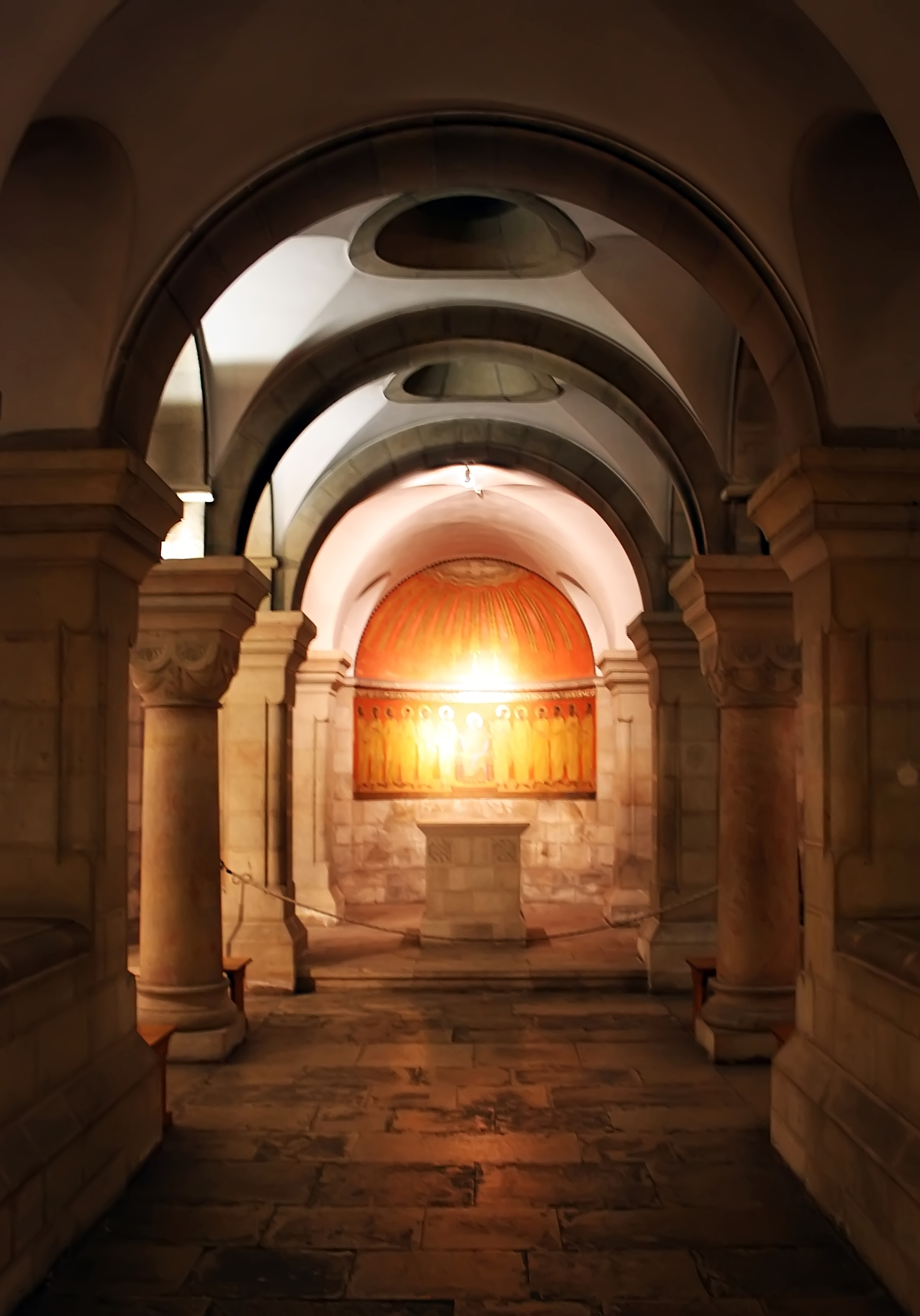
Corridor at Dormition Abbey

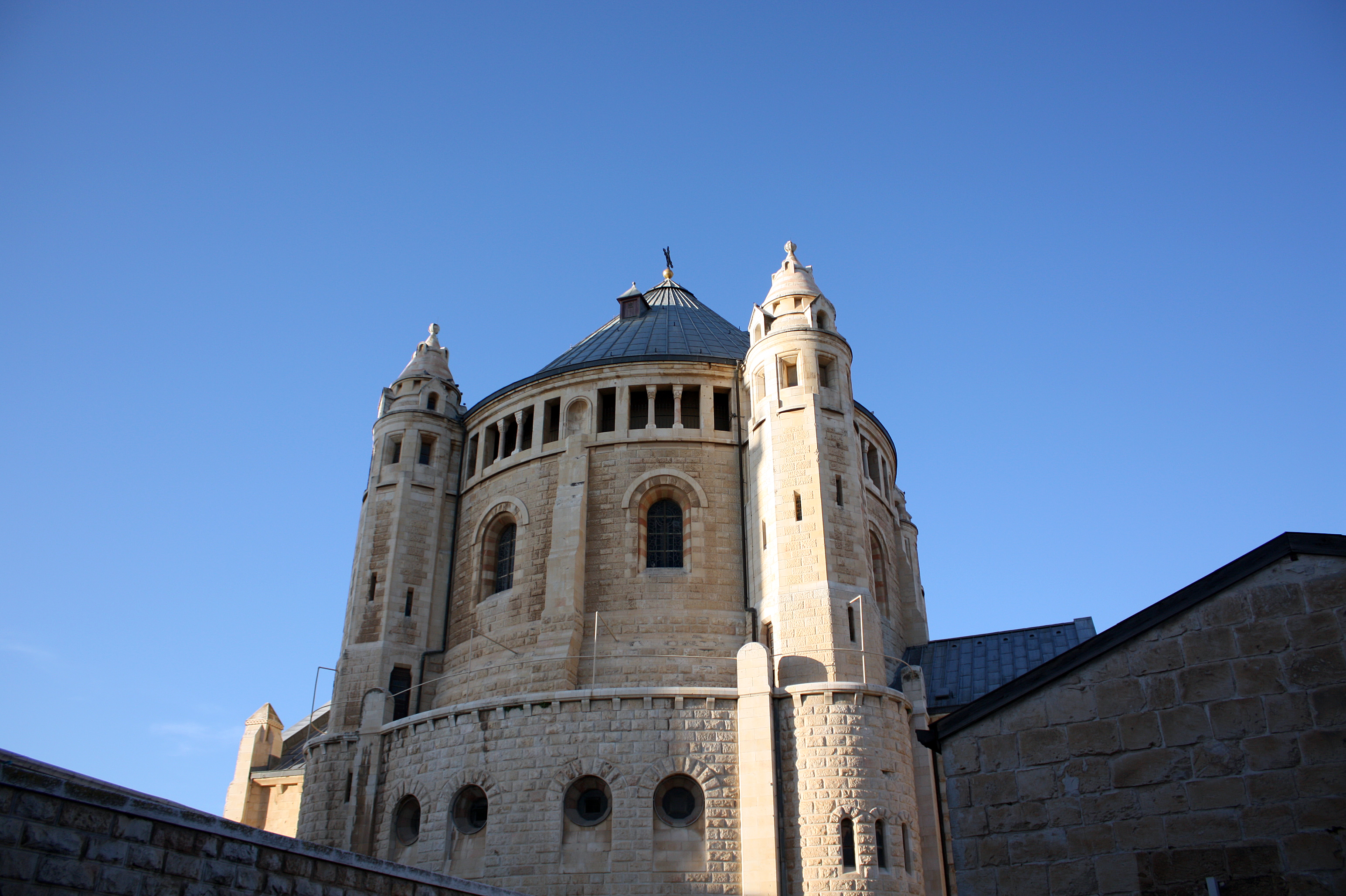
A view of Dormition Abbey

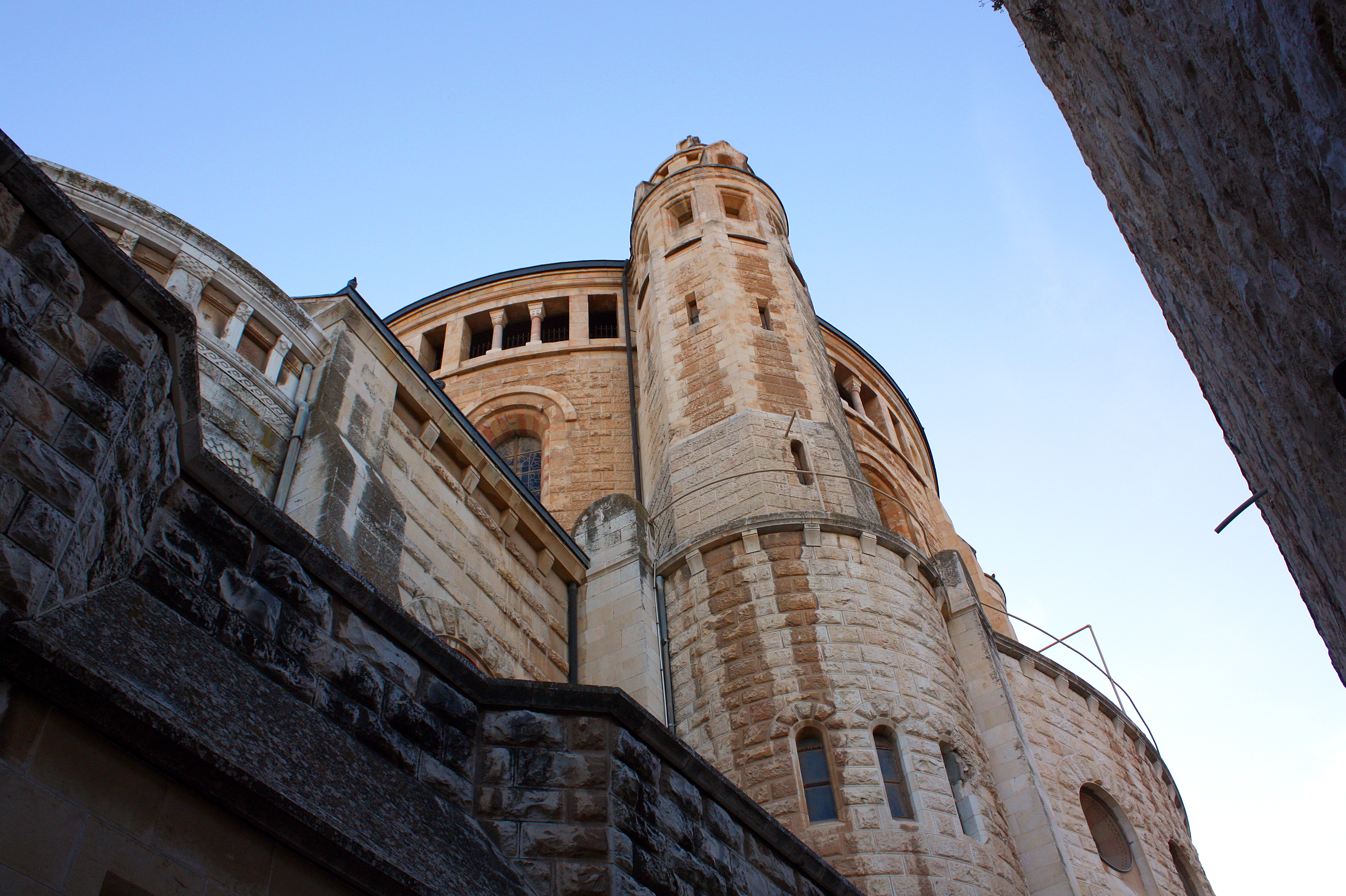
A view of Dormition Abbey

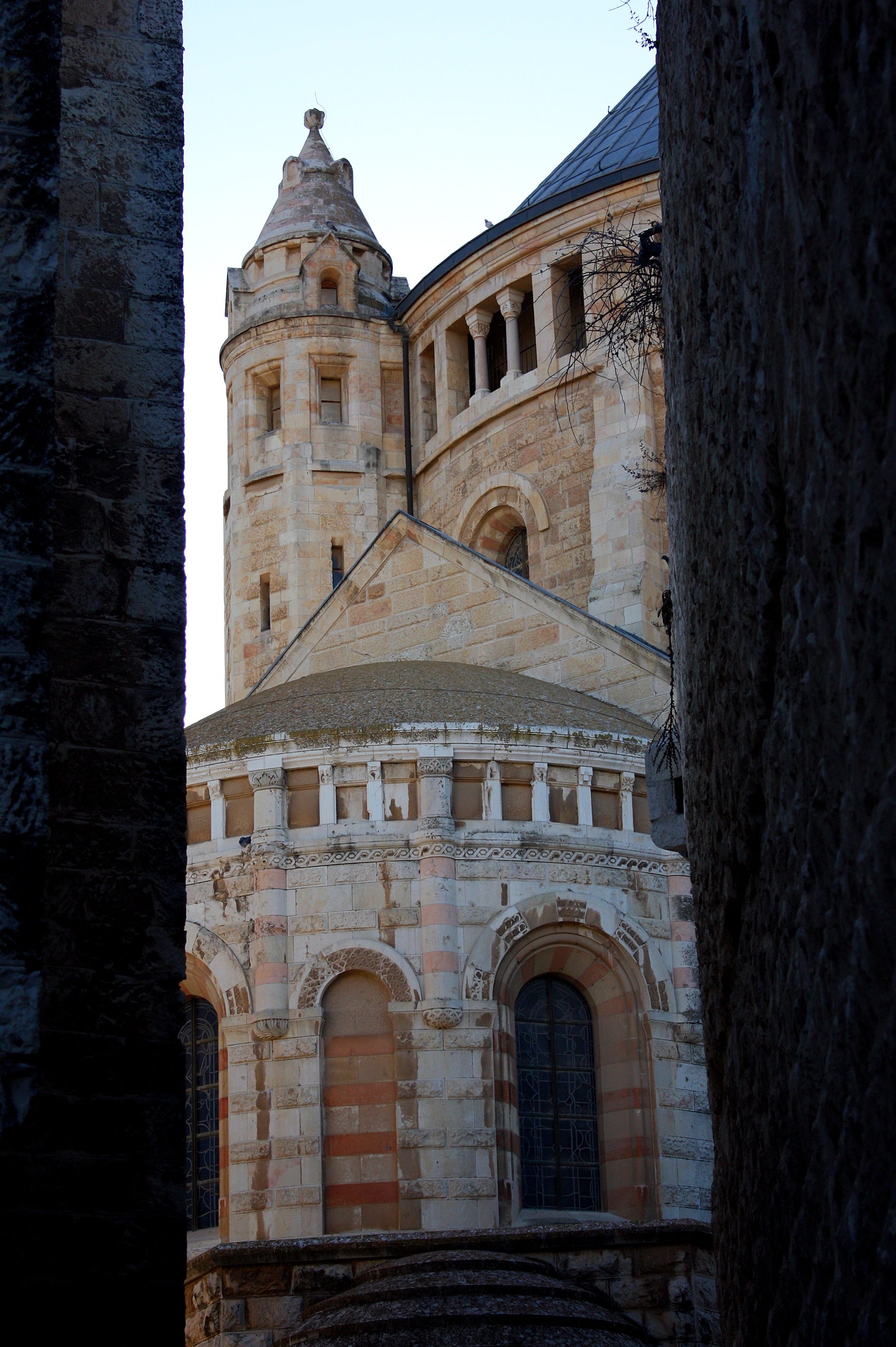
A view of Dormition Abbey

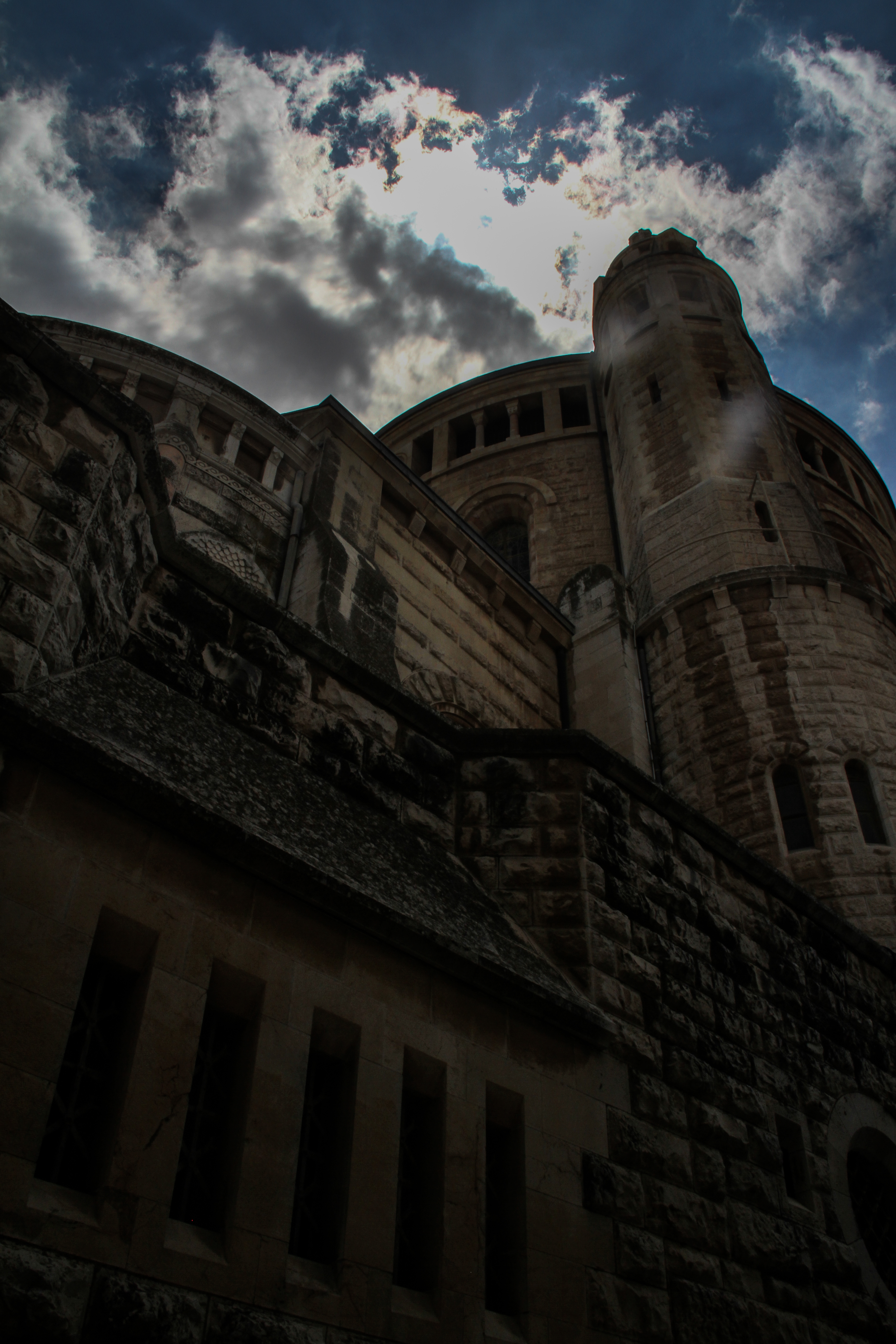
A view of Dormition Abbey

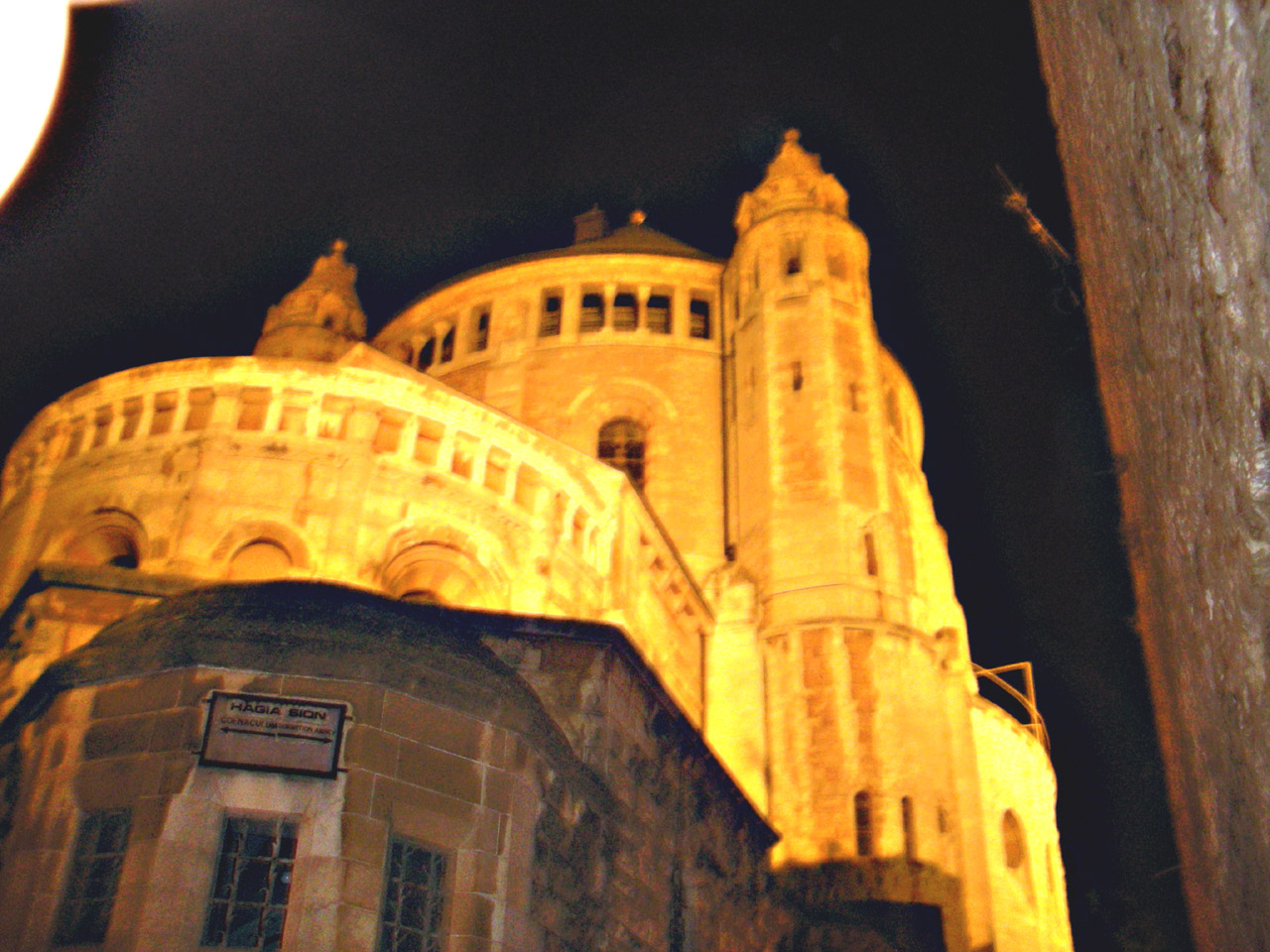
A view in the evening

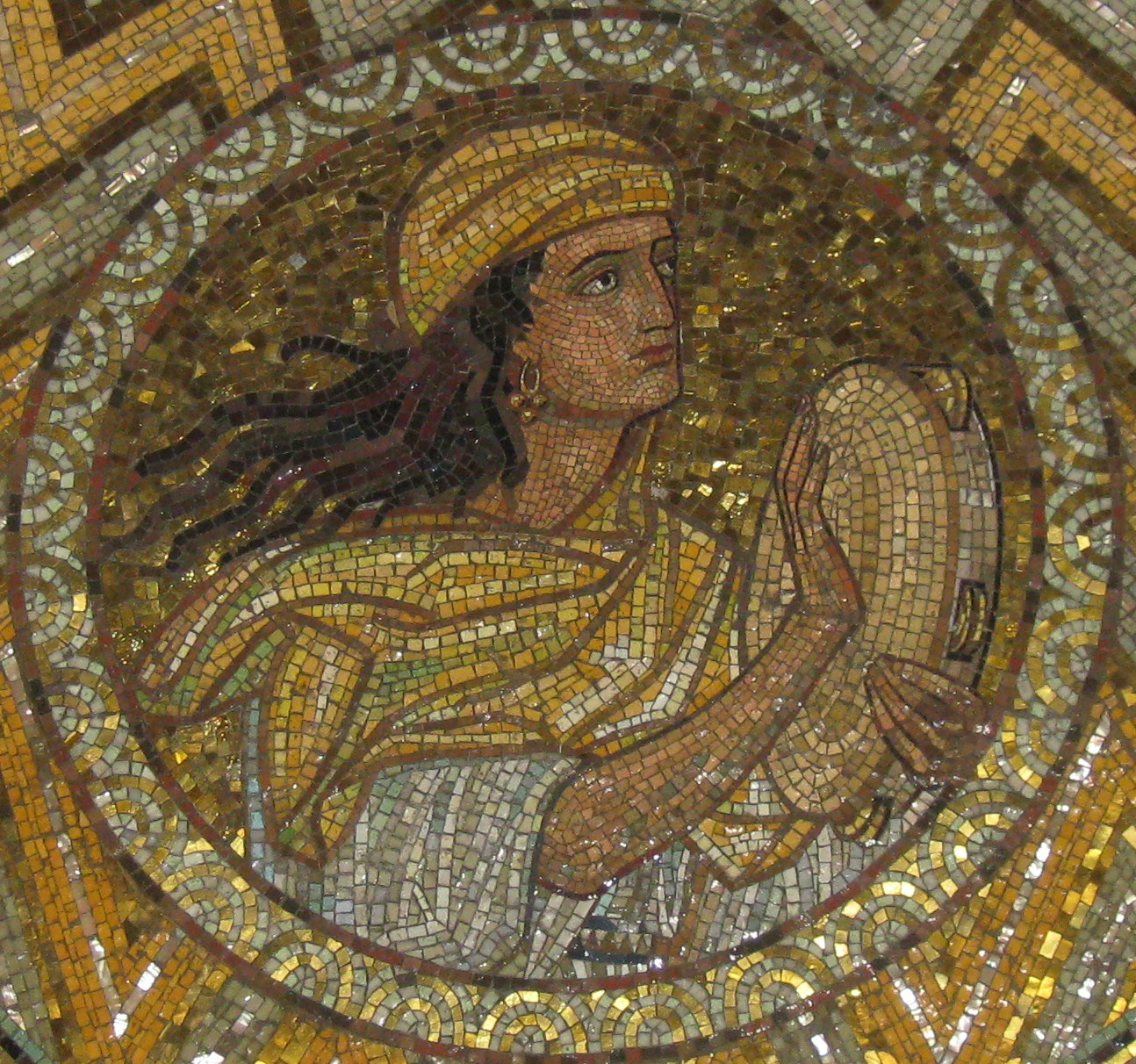
Miriam the prophetess
