= Cenacle =

Building associated with the Last Supper

Coordinates: 31°46′18″N 35°13′44″E

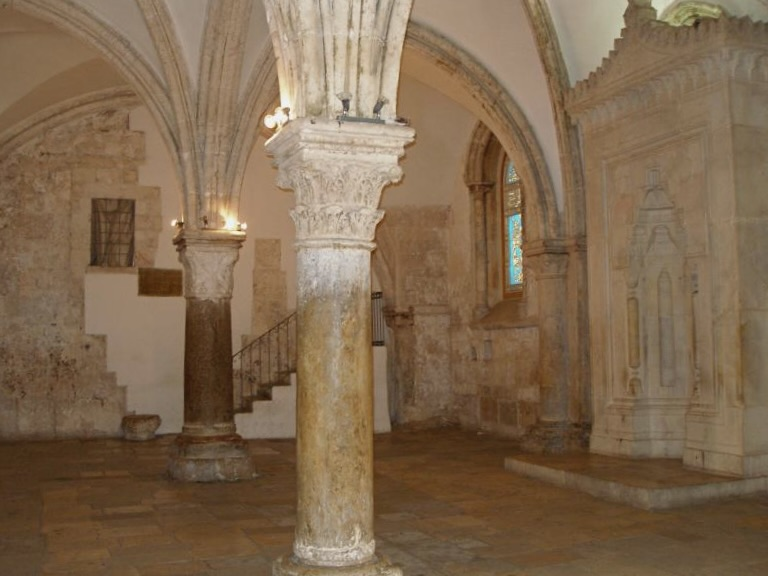
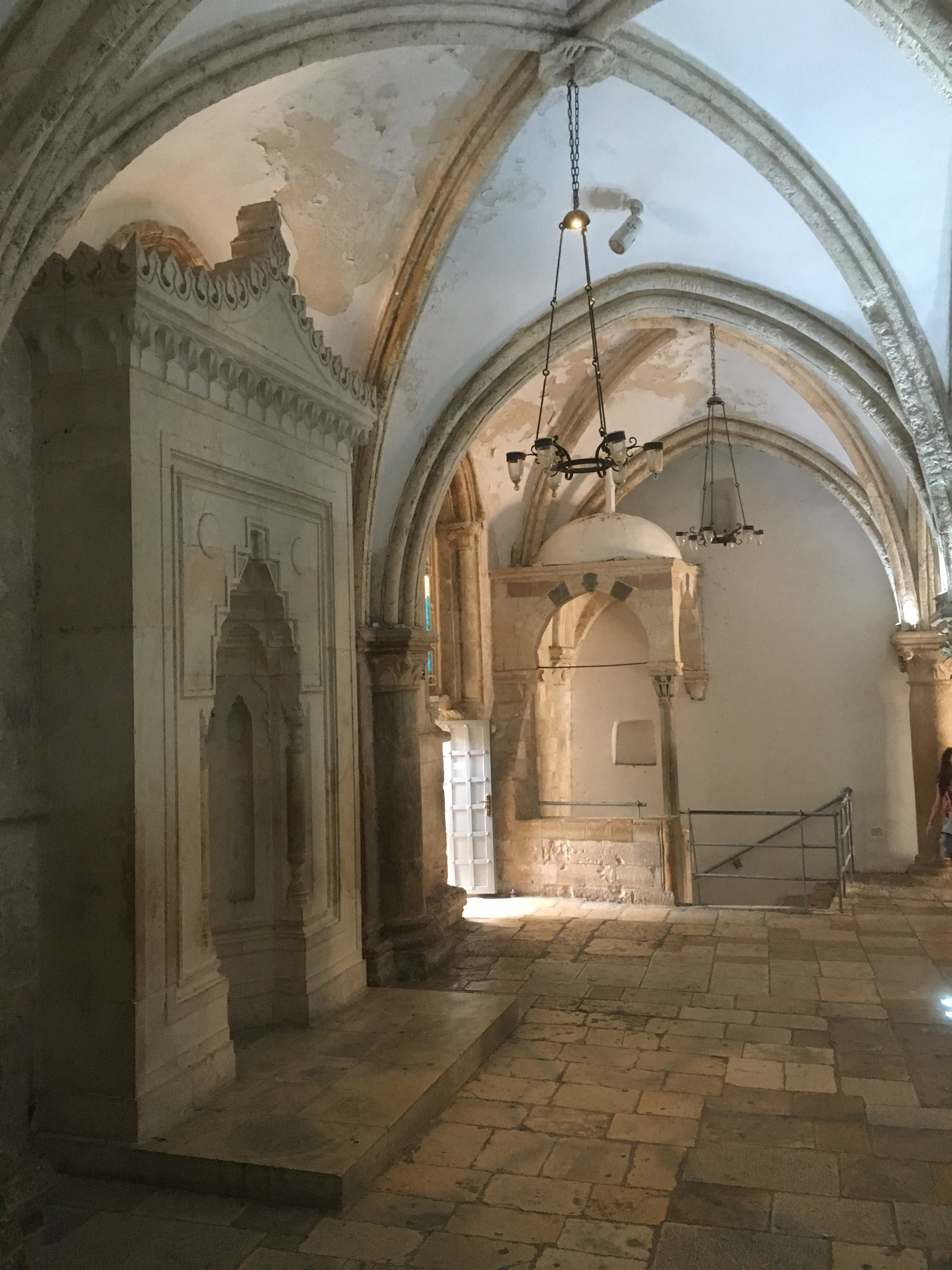
Cenacle on Mount Zion

The Cenacle (from the Latin cenaculum, "dining room"), also known as the Upper Room (from the Koine Greek anagaion and hyperōion, both meaning "upper room"), is a room in Mount Zion in Jerusalem, just outside the Old City walls, traditionally held to be the site of the Last Supper, the final meal that, in the Gospel accounts, Jesus held with the apostles.

According to the Christian Bible, the Cenacle was a place in which the apostles continued to gather after the Last Supper, and it was also the site where the Holy Spirit alighted upon the twelve apostles on Pentecost, Matthias having been "numbered with the eleven apostles" to replace Judas in Acts 1:25.

The site is administered by the Israeli authorities, and is part of a building holding what is known as "David's Tomb" on its ground floor.

== Etymology ==
"Cenacle" is a derivative of the Latin word ceno, which means "I dine". Jerome used the Latin coenaculum for both Greek words in his Latin Vulgate translation.

"Upper room" is derived from the Gospel of Mark and the Gospel of Luke, which both employ the Koine Greek: anagaion (ἀνάγαιον, Mark 14:15 and Luke 22:12), whereas the Acts of the Apostles uses the Koine Greek hyperōion (ὑπερῷον, Acts 1:13), both with the meaning "upper room".

== Overview ==
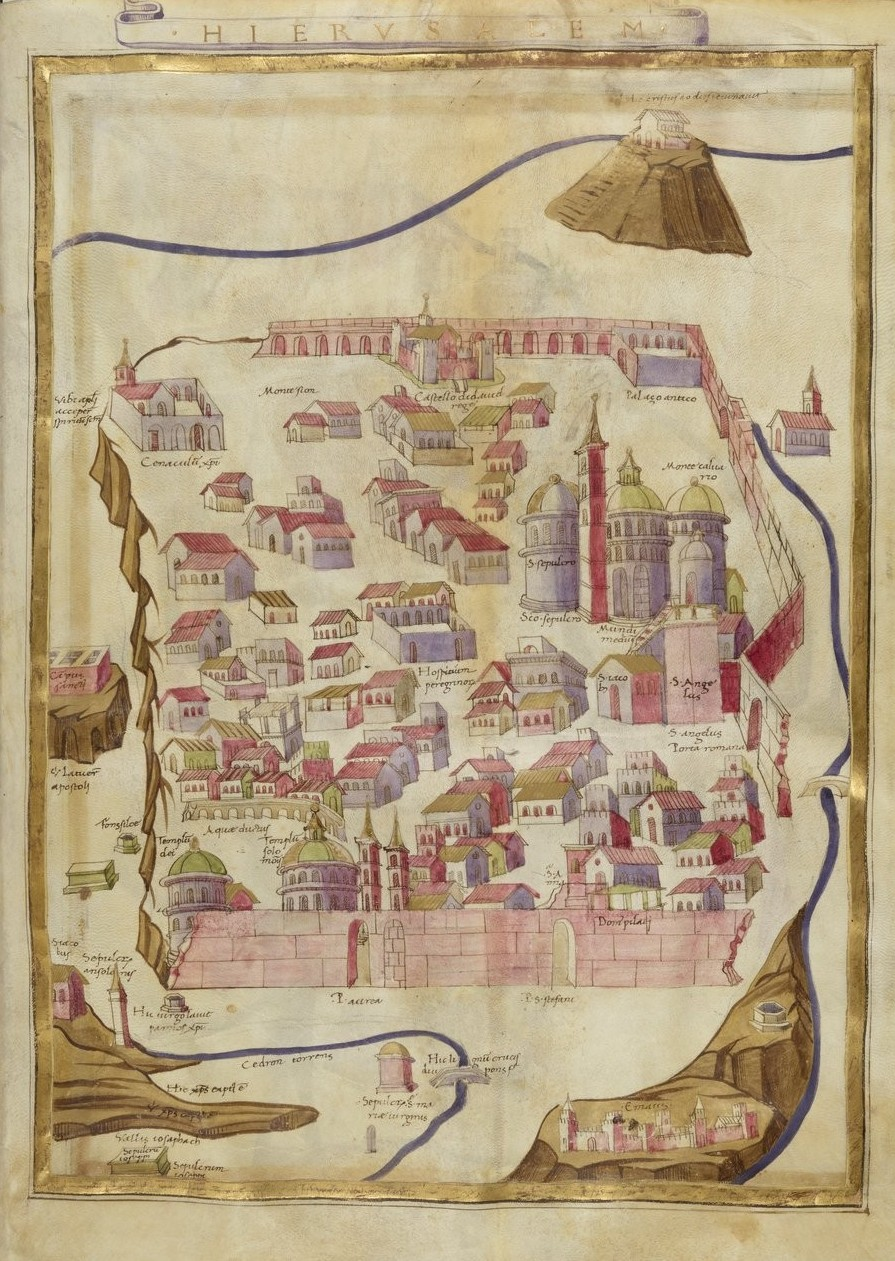
A 1472 map of Jerusalem notes the place of the pentecost, "Ubi apostoli acceperunt spiritum sanctum", at the location of the cenacle (top left).

The building has experienced numerous cycles of destruction and reconstruction, culminating in the Gothic structure which stands today.

=== Foundational events from the Gospels ===
The Cenacle is considered the site where many major events described in the New Testament took place, such as:

- preparation for the celebration of Jesus's final Passover meal
- the washing of his disciples' feet
- the Last Supper
- certain resurrection appearances of Jesus (Mark 16:14, Luke 24:33, John 20:19)
- the gathering of the disciples after the Ascension of Jesus (Acts 1:13)
- the election of Saint Matthias as apostle (Acts 1:15)
- the descent of the Holy Spirit upon the disciples on the day of Pentecost (Acts 2:1–4). As a result, Peter and the other apostles went out, converted to their faith and baptised 3,000 people in one day (Acts 2:5–41).

In Christian tradition, the room was not only the site of the Last Supper, i.e., the Cenacle, but the room in which the Holy Spirit alighted upon the twelve apostles and other believers gathered and praying together on Pentecost. Acts 1-2 tell us that Judas had been replaced by Matthias, and 120 followers of Jesus gathered in this room after his ascension.

=== Theories regarding Apostolic Age ===
It is sometimes thought to be the place where the apostles stayed in Jerusalem. The language in Acts of the Apostles suggests that the apostles used the room as a temporary residence (Koine Greek: οὗ ἦσαν καταμένοντες, hou ēsan katamenontes), although the Jamieson-Fausset-Brown Bible Commentary disagrees, preferring to see the room as a place where they were "not lodged, but had for their meeting place".

=== Dormition of Mary ===
The general location of the Cenacle is also associated with that of the house where the Virgin Mary lived among the apostles until her death or dormition, an event celebrated in the nearby Church of the Dormition.

=== Early building ===
Pilgrims to Jerusalem report visiting a structure on Mount Zion commemorating the Last Supper since the 4th century AD. Some scholars would have it that this was the Cenacle, in fact a synagogue from an earlier time. The anonymous pilgrim from Bordeaux, France reported seeing such a synagogue in 333. A Christian synagogue is mentioned in the apocryphal 4th-century Anaphora Pilati ("Report of Pilate"); although the depiction is fantastic and of questionable reliability (the report claims that all of the other synagogues were destroyed by divine wrath immediately after Jesus's death), a Jewish origin for the building has come under serious question.

=== The "Tomb of King David" ===
While the term Cenacle refers only to the Upper Room, a niche located on the lower level of the same building is associated by tradition with the burial site of King David, marked by a large cenotaph-sarcophagus that dates to the 12th-century, but earlier mentioned in the 10th-century Vita Constantini. Most accept the notice in 1 Kings 2:10 that says that David was buried "in the City of David", identified as the Eastern hill of ancient Jerusalem, as opposed to what is today called Mount Sion, the Western hill of the ancient city.

== History ==
=== Theoretical pre-Byzantine building ===
The early history of the Cenacle site is uncertain; scholars have attempted to establish a chronology based on archaeological, artistic and historical sources.

Based on the survey conducted by Jacob Pinkerfeld in 1948, Pixner believes that the original building was a synagogue later probably used by Jewish Christians. However, no architectural features associated with early synagogues such as columns, benches, or other accoutrements are present in the lower Tomb chamber. According to Epiphanius, bishop of Salamis writing towards the end of the 4th century, the building and its environs were spared during the destruction of Jerusalem under Titus (AD 70). Pixner suggests that the Mount Zion site was destroyed and rebuilt in the later first century. The lowest courses of ashlars (building stones) along the north, east and south walls are attributed by Pinkerfeld to the late Roman period (135-325). Pixner believes that they are Herodian-period ashlars, dating the construction of the building to an earlier period.

=== Byzantine-period building or buildings ===
Many scholars, however, date the walls' earliest construction to the Byzantine period and identify the Cenacle as the remains of a no-longer-extant Hagia Sion ("Holy Zion") basilica. Emperor Theodosius I constructed the five-aisled Hagia Sion basilica, likely between 379 and 381.

6th-century artistic representations, such as the mosaics found in Madaba, Jordan (the "Madaba Map") and at the Basilica of Santa Maria Maggiore in Rome, depict a smaller structure to the south of the basilica. Some have identified this smaller structure as the Cenacle, thus demonstrating its independence from, and possible prior existence to, the basilica. The basilica (and possibly the Cenacle) was later damaged by Persian invaders in 614 but restored by the patriarch Modestus.

In 965 the church was burned down after a Muslim mob killed patriarch John VII and then again in 1009 when Fatimid caliph Al-Hakim ordered the destruction of all Christian churches in Jerusalem, an event lamented by Arab Christian poet Sulayman al-Ghazzi.

=== Crusader-period building ===
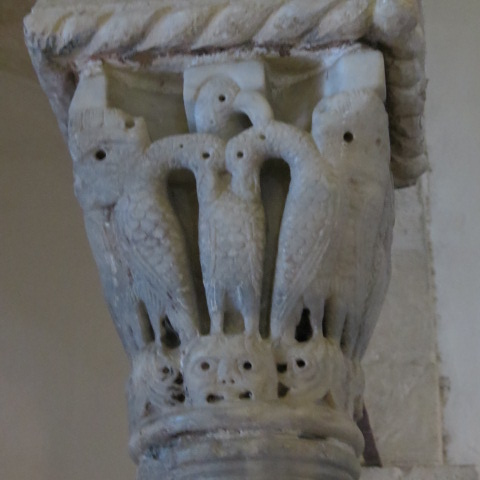
Capital decorated with pelicans, a symbol of Jesus in Christian iconography

After the First Crusade, the leader of the newly established Kingdom of Jerusalem, Godfrey of Bouillon, re-founded the church as a Latin abbey and in the twelfth century the basilica was rebuilt. The Cenacle was either repaired or enclosed by the Crusader church, occupying a portion of two aisles on the right (southern) side of the altar. The Crusader cathedral was destroyed soon afterward, in the late 12th or early 13th century, but the Cenacle remained. (Today, part of the site upon which the Byzantine and Crusader churches stood is believed to be occupied by the smaller Church of the Dormition and its abbey.)

=== Under renewed Muslim rule ===
==== Monastery ====
Syrian Christians maintained the Cenacle until 1337 when it passed into the custody of the Franciscan Order of Friars who managed the structure for almost two centuries.

==== Mosque ====
In 1524, during Suleiman the Magnificent's rule, Ottoman authorities took possession of the Cenacle, converting it into a mosque: the Masjid an-Nabī (al-Nabī) Dāwūd (مسجد النبي داوود lit. 'Mosque of the Prophet David'). By 1551 the Franciscans had been fully evicted from their surrounding buildings. Non-Muslims were banned from entering though it was possible by bribing the custodians of the Dajani family.

Only in 1831 were Christians again allowed to celebrate mass in the cenacle though visits, such as that of Melchior de Vogüé, were dependant on the goodwill of the guardian.

=== British Mandate and Israel ===
During the British Mandate, Christians and Jews were allowed greater freedom in visiting their respective holy sites in the complex. The historical building is currently managed by the Israeli Ministry of the Interior. Pope John Paul II celebrated mass in the Cenacle during his pilgrimage to Israel in the year 2000.

== Historical worship and relics ==
=== Column of the Flagellation ===
Pilgrim Egeria, who visited the site in the 4th century, described the presence in the Cenacle of the Column of the Flagellation, which was venerated there at dawn on Good Friday. In the 14th century, the Column of the Flagellation was removed from the Cenacle and taken to the Church of the Holy Sepulchre.

== Architecture and date (12th, 13th, 14th c.?) ==
Scholars offer wide-ranging dates and builders for the surviving Gothic-style Cenacle. Some believe that it was constructed by Crusaders just before Saladin's conquest of Jerusalem in 1187, while others attribute it to Holy Roman Emperor Frederick II, after he arrived in the city in 1229. Still others hold that it was not built in this form until the Franciscans acquired the site in the 1330s. Scarce documentation and disturbed structural features offer little strong support for any of these dates.

=== Early modern assessments ===
The primary early modern assessments of the Cenacle were recorded by French archaeologists. The first detailed assessment was by Eugène-Melchior de Vogüé in 1860. This was largely followed by other commentators until the work of Camille Enlart and Louis-Hugues Vincent / Félix-Marie Abel.

=== Layout ===
In its current state, the Cenacle is divided into six rib-vaulted bays. The bays are supported by three freestanding columns which bilaterally divide the space, as well as six pillars flanking the side walls. While the capital of the westernmost freestanding column is flush with the Cenacle's interior wall, the column shaft itself is completely independent of the wall, leading scholars to consider the possibility that this wall was not original to the building.

=== Capitals and columns ===
An analysis of the column and pillar capitals offers clues, but not a solution, to the mystery of the current building's origin. The Corinthianesque capital between the second and third bays of the Cenacle is stylistically indicative of multiple geographical regions and chronological periods. This capital's spiky leaves, which tightly adhere to the volume of the column before erupting into scrolls, are in congruence with common outputs of the 12th-century sculpture workshop at the Temple site in Jerusalem in the last years before Saladin's conquest in 1187. The workshop also frequently utilized drilling as an ornamental device. The Jerusalem workshop included artists from diverse regions in the West, who brought stylistic traits with them from their native countries. The workshop produced sculpture for many Crusader projects and other structures, such as the al-Aqsa mosque.

This comparison allows for the support of the 12th century date of the Cenacle. There are also, however, similar capitals which originated in workshops in southern Italy, a draw for scholars who wish to associate the building with Holy Roman Emperor Frederick II and the Sixth Crusade in 1229. Examples can be seen in the Romanesque cathedral in Bitonto, a small city near Bari, in southern Italy, and on the columns of the pulpit in the Pisa Baptistery, carved by the Apulian-born sculptor Nicola Pisano in 1260.

The capitals of the freestanding columns are not identical. The capital between the first and second bays seems either severely weathered or shallowly carved, and its volume is a marked contrast from the others. It rises from the shaft in a straight cylinder, rather than in an inverted pyramid, and then flares only just before it intersects with the abacus. The third capital, which now flanks the Cenacle's western wall, is also unique among the three. It is not decorated with a floral motif, rather, scrolling crockets spring from the base of the volume. Enlart has proposed a comparison to buildings constructed by Frederick II in Apulia.

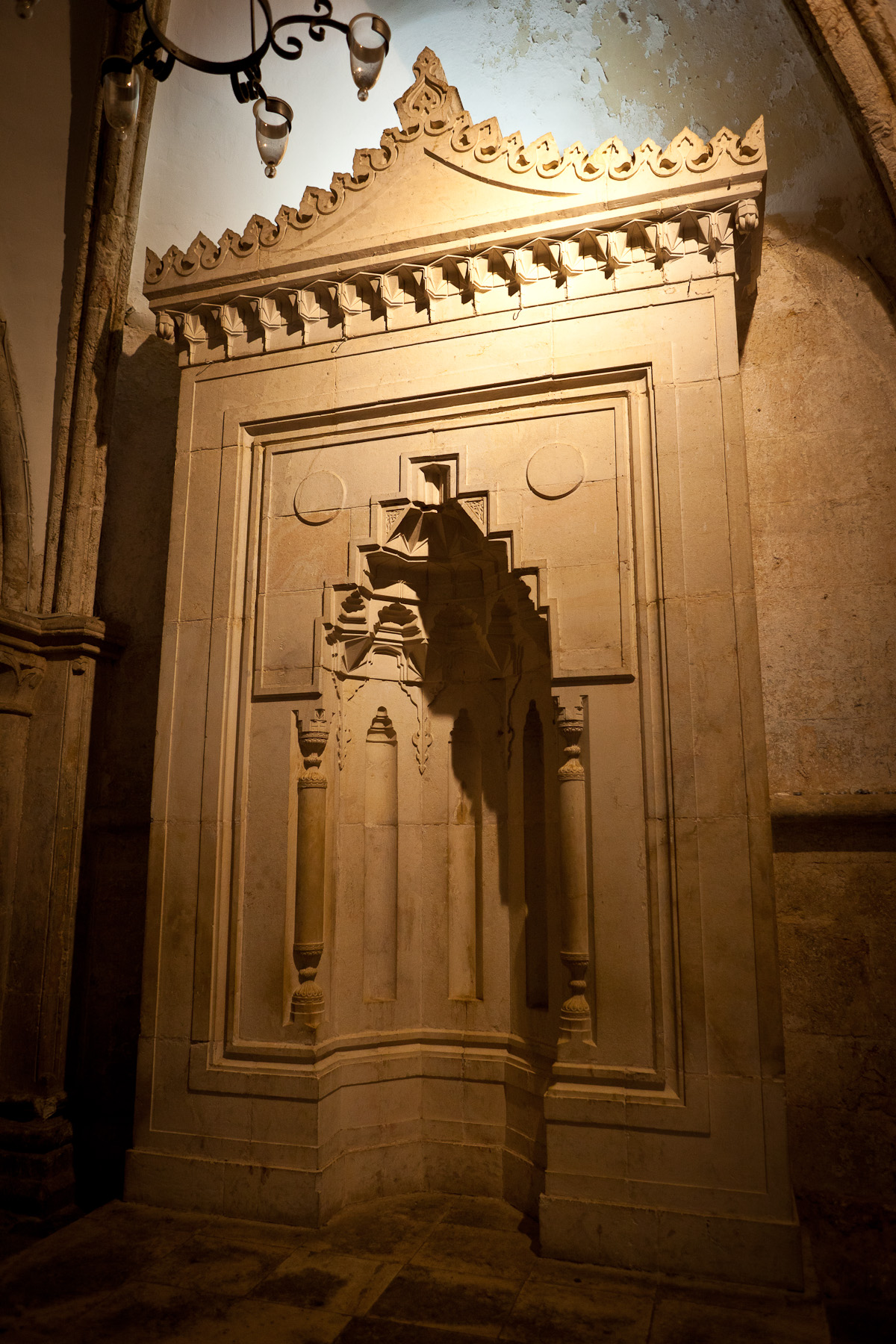
The mihrab

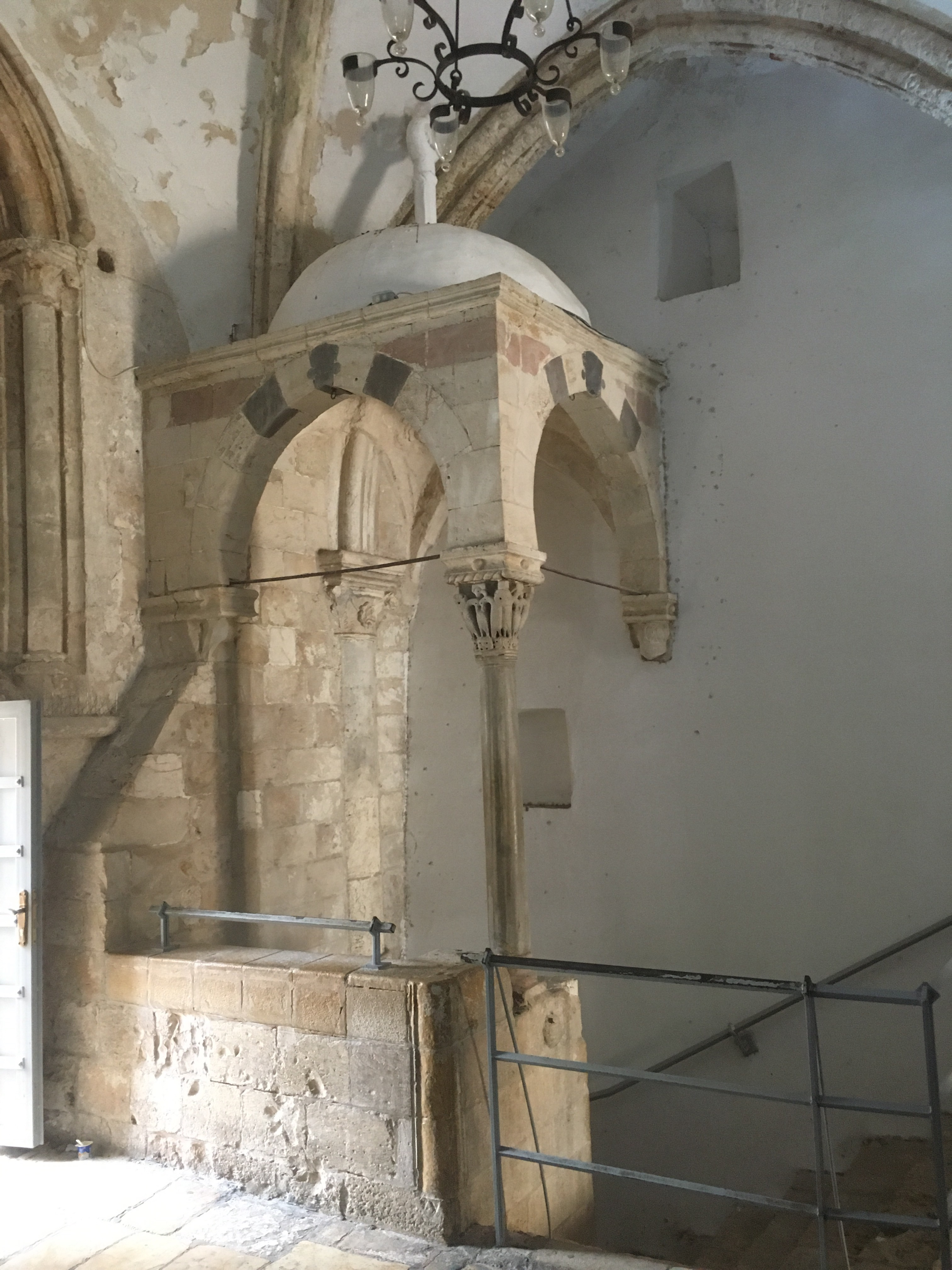
The small canopic dome over the stairs

Analysis of these column capitals does not yield significant evidence to link them to the 14th century and a potential Franciscan construction, nor does it definitively date them to the 12th or 13th century. The building remains a frustrating, but intriguing, mystery.

== Muslim architectural elements ==
Architectural evidence remains of the period of Muslim control including the elaborate mihrab in the Last Supper room, the Arabic inscriptions on its walls, the qubba over the stairwell, and the minaret and dome atop the roof.

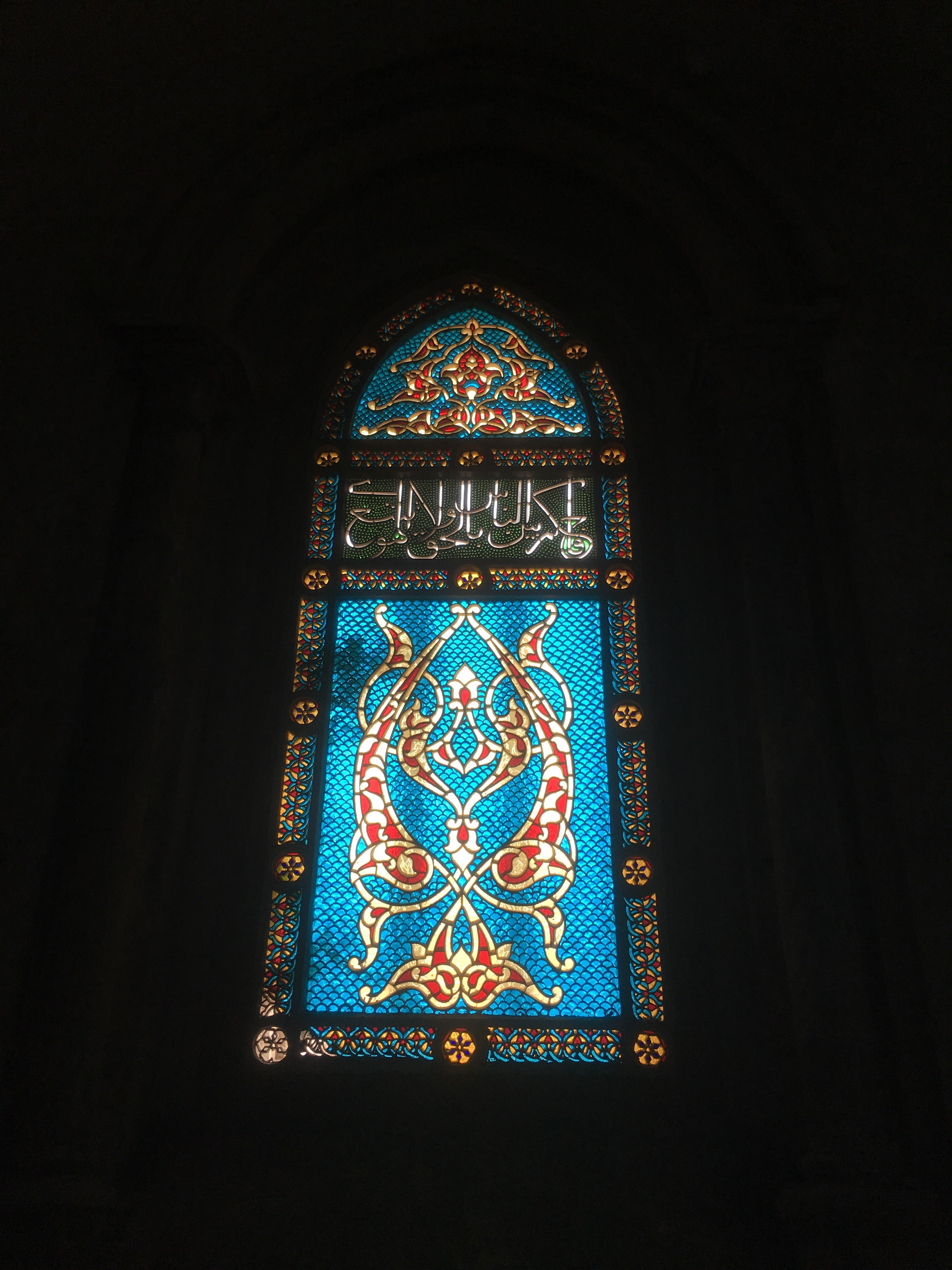
Left window

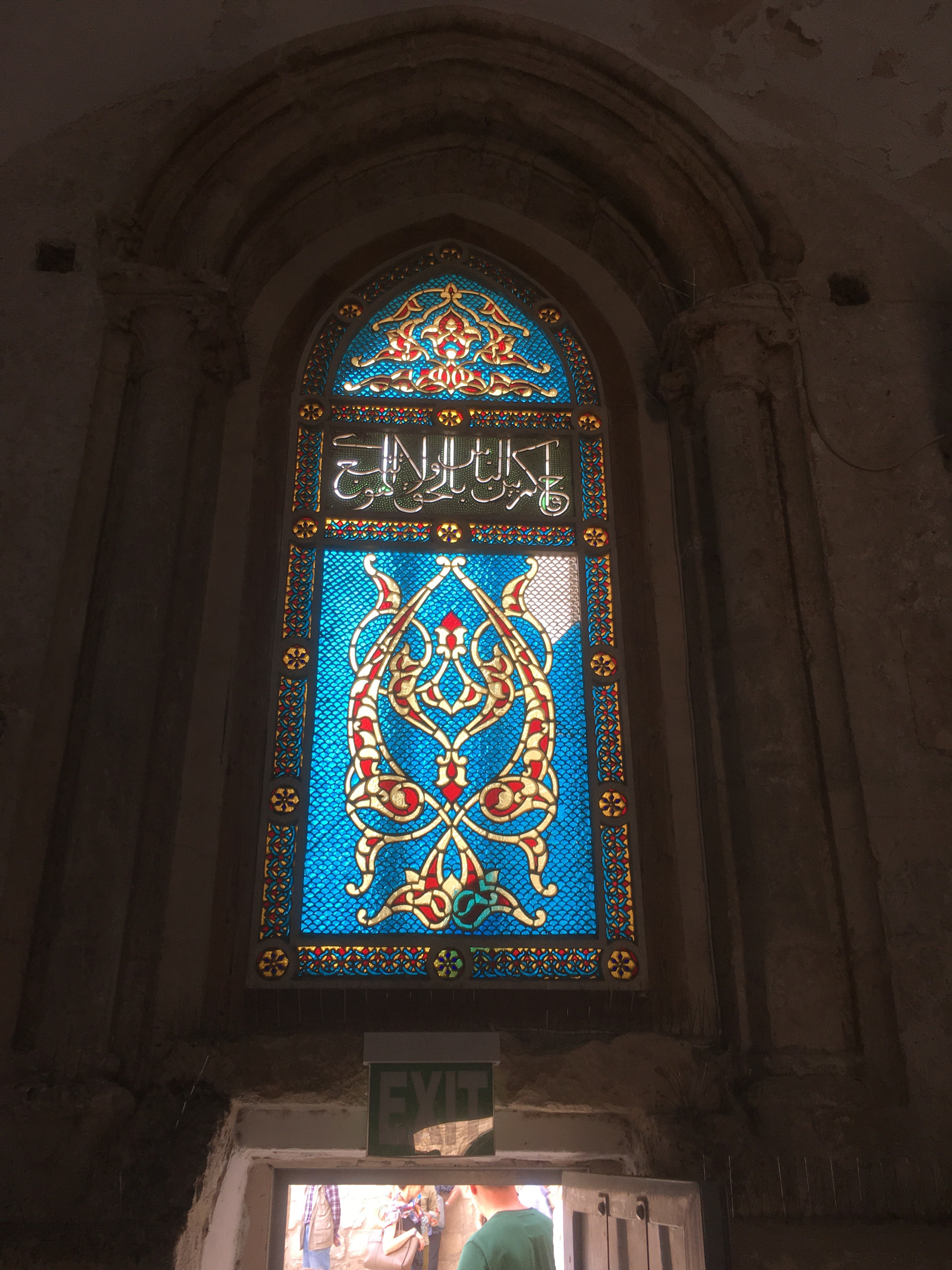
Right window

The two stained glass windows, with an inscription: Arabic: فَاحْكُم بَيْنَ النَّاسِ بِالْحَقِّ وَلَا تَتَّبِعِ الْهَوَىٰ, lit. 'judge between the people in truth and do not follow [your own] desire', from Quran 38:26, known as the "Story of David and the Two Litigants"

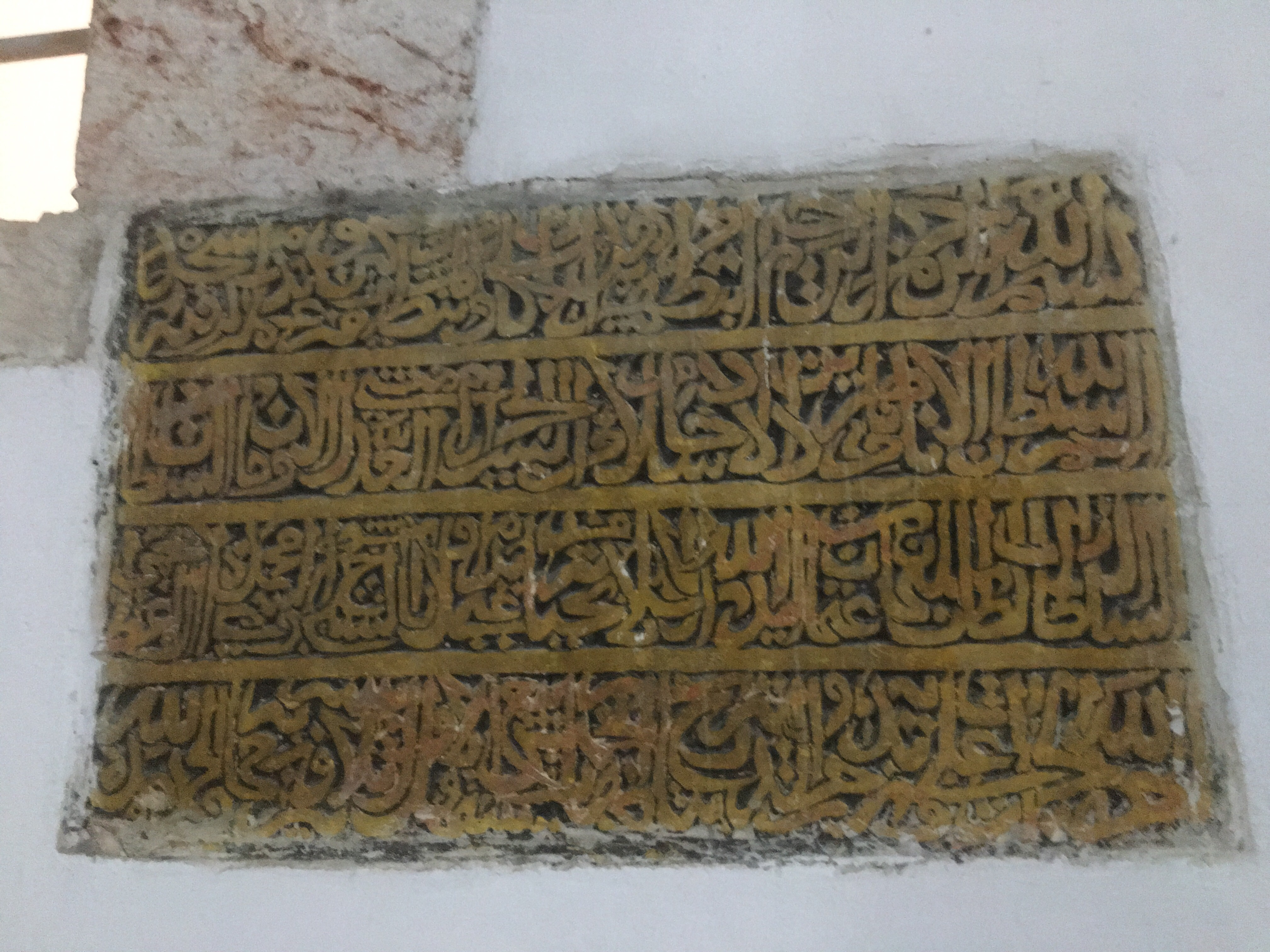
1524 AD (930 AH) Ottoman datestone commemorating the conversion into a mosque.

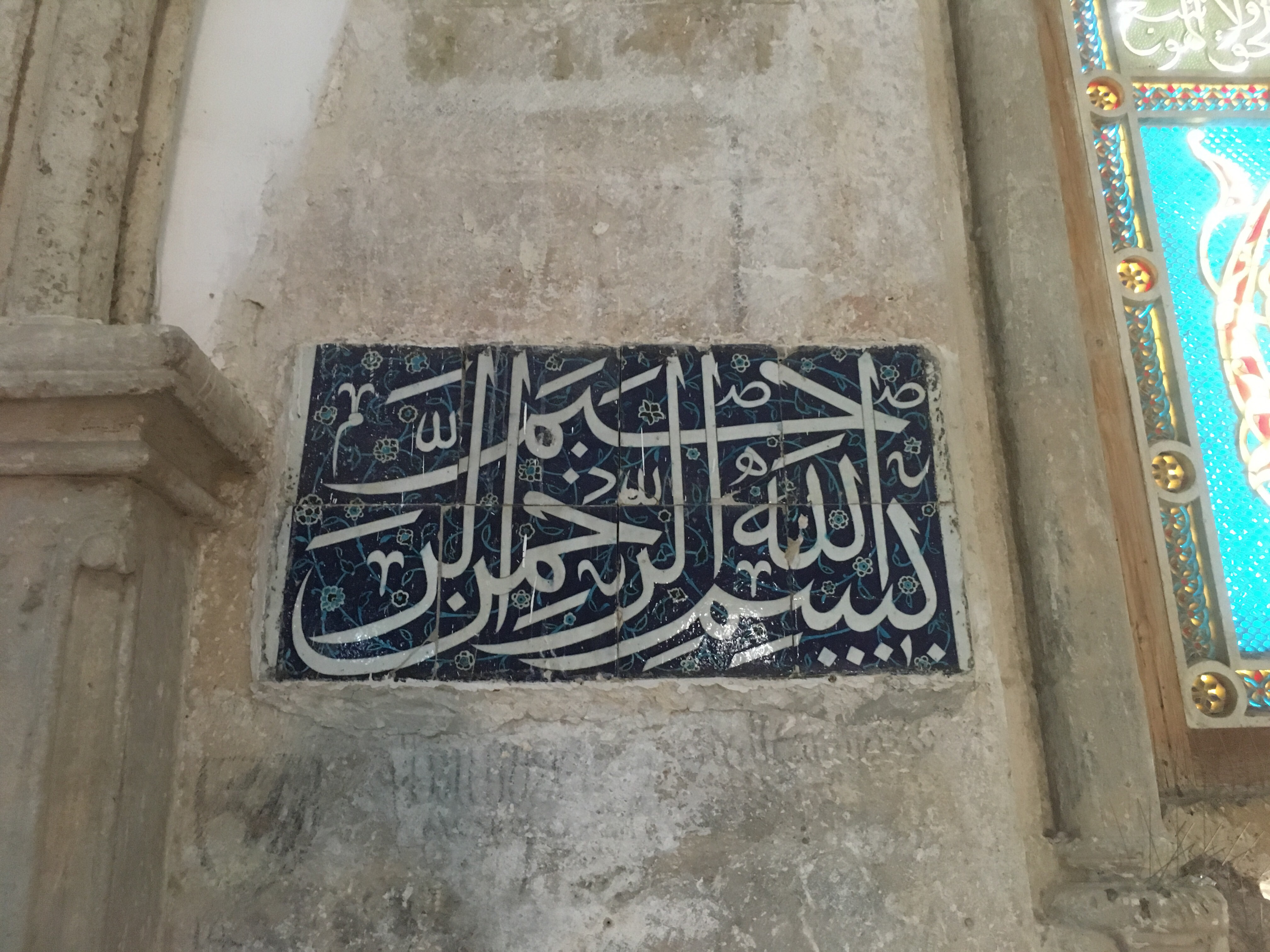
Tiled inscription of the Basmala

The two Arabic calligraphy inscriptions

== References in hymns ==
The upper room is a focus of reference in several Christian hymns, for example in "An upper room did our Lord prepare", written by Fred Pratt Green in 1973, and in "Come, risen Lord, and deign to be our guest" ('We meet, as in that upper room they met...'), written by George Wallace Briggs.

== Alternative site ==
The Monastery of Saint Mark in the Old City of Jerusalem near the Armenian Quarter is considered by some as the authentic site of the Last Supper. The monastery church, belonging to the Syriac Orthodox Church, contains an early Christian stone inscription testifying to reverence for the spot.

== See also ==
- Church of Zion, Jerusalem or Church of the Apostles on Mount Zion, Roman-era church or synagogue speculated to have belonged to an early Jewish-Christian congregation

== Sources ==
- Pierotti, Ermete, 1864, Jerusalem explored: being a description of the ancient and modern city, with numerous illustrations consisting of views, ground plans, and sections
- Reem, Amit; Berkovich, Ilya (October 2016). "New Discoveries in the Cenacle: Reassessing the Art, Architecture and Chronology of the Crusader Basilica on Mount Sion". New Studies in the Archaeology of Jerusalem and Its Region. X: 56–92.
