= Church of Zion, Jerusalem =

Hypothetical early Jewish-Christian congregation and its house of worship

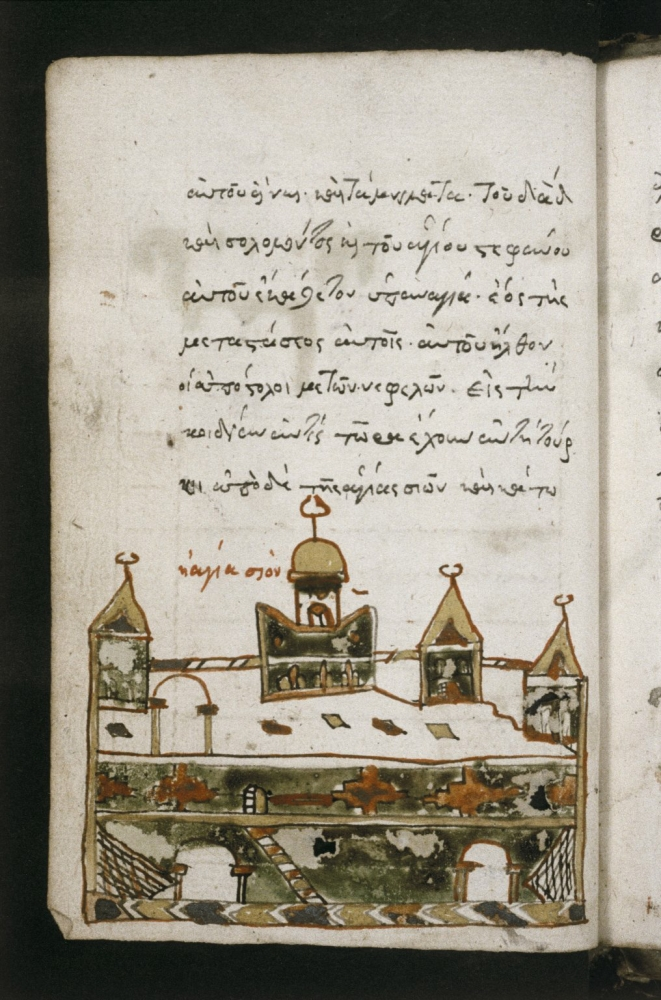
The "Church of Zion", actually the Cenacle building. Miniature from a 1693 Greek-language Proskynetarion, a pilgrim's guide book to the holy places in Jerusalem and Palestine.

The Church of Zion, also known as the Church of the Apostles on Mount Zion, is a presumed Jewish-Christian congregation continuing at Mount Zion in Jerusalem in the 2nd-5th century, distinct from the main Gentile congregation which had its home at the Church of the Holy Sepulchre.

There have been attempts at identifying the lower, possibly Roman-period layers of the building housing the so-called "Tomb of David" and the Cenacle, as the remains of the house of worship of this presumed Jewish-Christian congregation.

== Theory ==
=== Ancient sources ===
The reference to such a Jewish-Christian congregation comes from the Bordeaux Pilgrim (c.333), Cyril of Jerusalem (348), and Eucherius of Lyon (440), but in academia the theory originates with Bellarmino Bagatti (1976), who considered that such a church, or Judaeo-Christian synagogue, continued in what was presumed as the old "Essene Quarter".

Emmanuel Testa's support for Bagatti's view led to the "Bagatti-Testa school", with the thesis that a surviving Jewish-Christian community existed in Jerusalem, and that many Jewish-Christians returned from Pella to Jerusalem after the First Jewish-Roman War and established themselves on Mount Zion.

Bagatti's theory is supported by Bargil Pixner (May 1990 Biblical Archaeology Review), who argues that the 6th-century Madaba Map shows two churches next to each other - the Basilica of Hagia Sion and the "Church of the Apostles", the putative Jewish-Christian synagogue of Mount Zion.

=== Archaeological interpretations ===
Connected with the Bagatti-Testa theory is the 1951 interpretation by archaeologist Jacob Pinkerfeld of the lower layers of the Mount Zion structure known as David's Tomb. Pinkerfeld saw in them the remains of a synagogue which, he concluded, had later been used as a Jewish-Christian church. Pinkerfeld dated the remains of the alleged synagogue to the 2nd-5th century, when Jerusalem was known under the Roman name of Aelia Capitolina.

==== Criticism ====
According to Edwin K. Broadhead, the problem with the thesis of Bagatti, Testa, Pinkerfeld and Pixner is that the layers indicate a Crusader structure built directly on top of apparently perfectly preserved Roman walls. Still, the fact that the alleged Roman walls align perfectly with Byzantine structures excavated in the same area is one argument in favour of dating Pinkerfeld's walls to the Byzantine period. Another one is that the Holy Zion basilica was truly huge (it is the largest church depicted on the Madaba Map, and the architect of the Dormition Abbey concluded from his 1899 excavations that it measured 60 by 40 metres), making it is more likely that the walls at "David's Tomb" were part of the basilica. Thirdly, the huge size of the earliest blocks from the walls, very likely recycled from Herodian buildings, fit much better with the basilica than with a small synagogue.

== See also ==
- Jerusalem in Christianity
