= Rodion =

Rodion (Russian: Родион) is a Slavic masculine given name of Greek origin, which is sometimes shortened to Rod. It may refer to:

== People ==
- Rodion Amirov (2001–2023), Russian ice hockey player
- Rodion Azarkhin (1931–2007), Russian musician
- Rodion Bakum (born 1990), German politician
- Rodion Cămătaru (born 1958), Romanian association football player
- Rodion Davelaar (born 1990), Antillean swimmer
- Rod Dyachenko (born 1983), Russian association football player
- Rodion Gačanin (born 1963), Croatian association football player and coach
- Rodion Kuzmin (1891–1949), Russian mathematician
- Rodion Luka (born 1972), Ukrainian yachtsman
- Rodion Malinovsky (1898–1967), Soviet military commander
- Rodion Markovits (1888–1948), Austro-Hungarian-born writer, journalist and lawyer
- Rodion Shchedrin (1932–2025), Soviet and Russian composer and pianist

== Fictional characters ==
- Rodion Romanovich Raskolnikov, the fictional protagonist of Crime and Punishment by Fyodor Dostoyevsky
- Rodion, character from Limbus Company

== See also ==
- Radion (given name)
- Herodion
- Rodionov
