= Mar Elias Monastery =

Monastery in Jerusalem, Israel

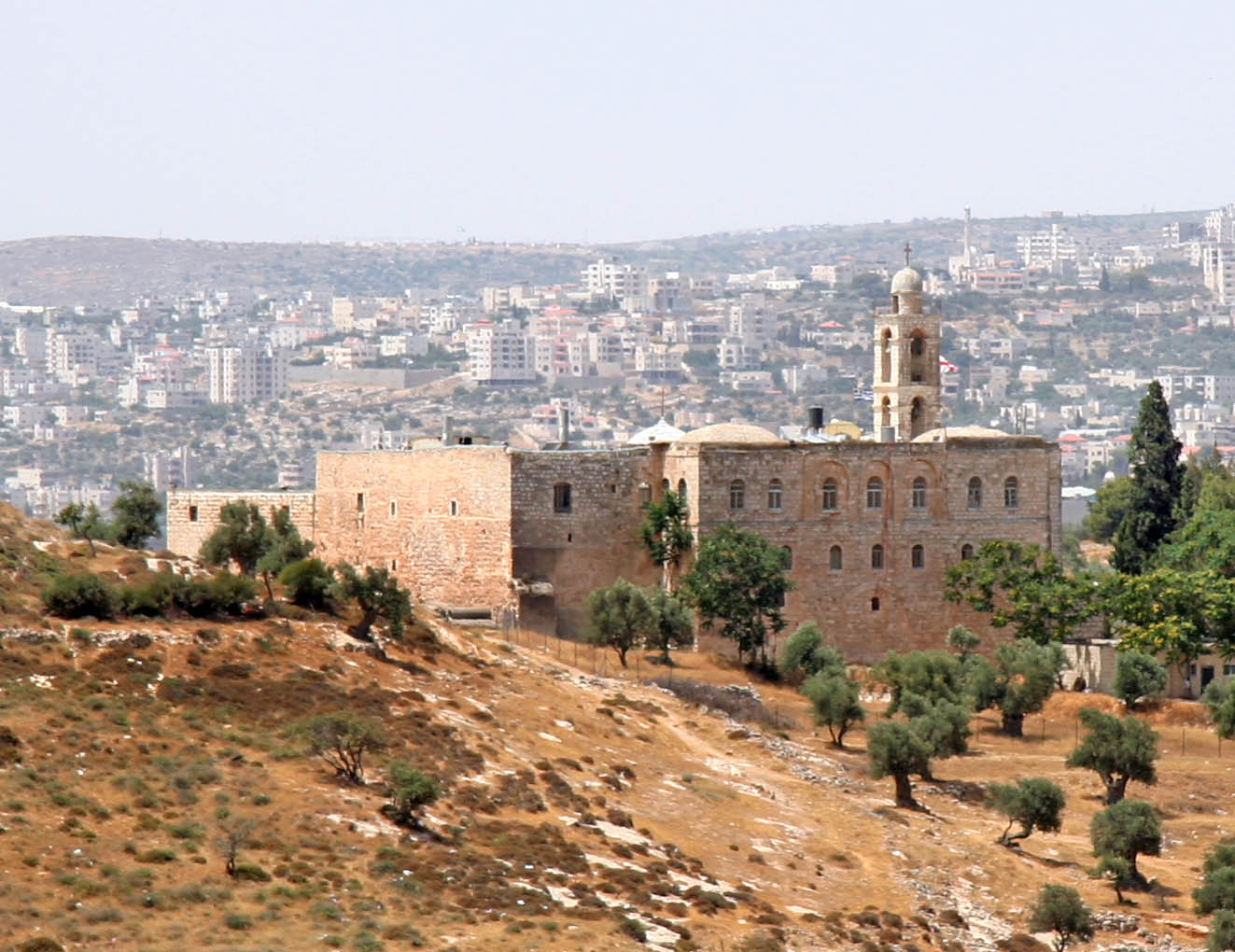
- Mar Elias Monastery

Religion
- Affiliation: Greek Orthodox Church

Location
- Location: East Jerusalem
- Interactive map of Mar Elias Monastery
- Palestine grid: 1700/1268
- Coordinates: 31°44′4.92″N 35°12′38.88″E

Mar Elias Monastery (Hebrew: מנזר אליהו הקדוש, Arabic: دير مار إلياس, romanized: Deir Mar Elias) is a Greek Orthodox monastery in south Jerusalem, on a hill overlooking Bethlehem and Herodium, near Hebron Road.

== History ==
=== Origin of the name, other traditions ===
According to Christian tradition, Elijah rested here after fleeing the vengeance of Jezebel. The monastery was rebuilt in the 1160s by Byzantine Emperor Manuel I Komnenos after being destroyed by an earthquake. It is also said to be the burial place of the Greek Bishop Elias of Bethlehem who died in 1345, and St. Elias, an Egyptian monk who became Patriarch of Jerusalem in 494.

Another Christian tradition is that Mary rested under the large hackberry tree growing north of the monastery when she was fleeing Herod, who had ordered the execution of all the children of Bethlehem.

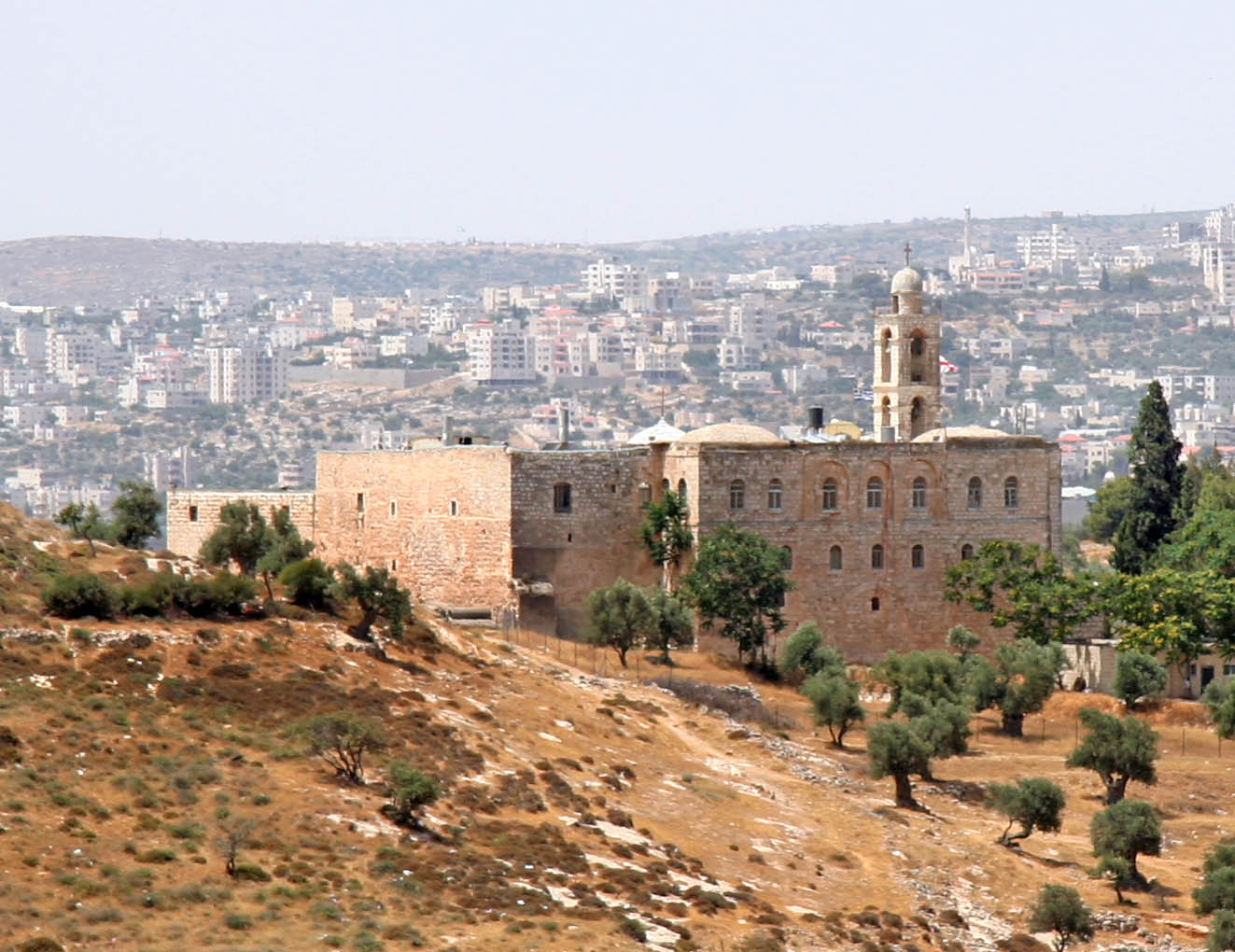
Mar Elias Monastery

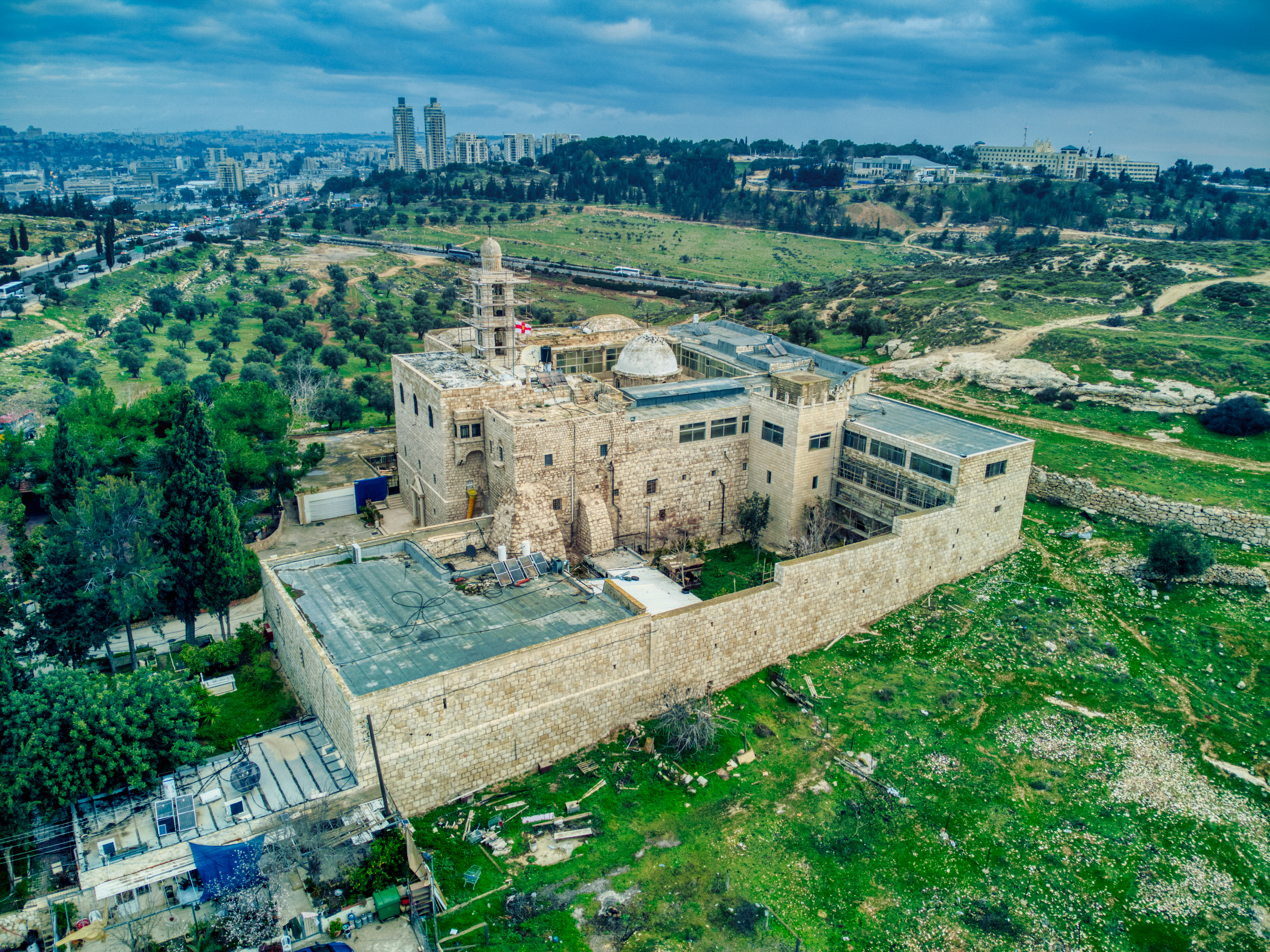
Mar Elias Monastery

=== 1956 shooting attack ===
From the hill east of the monastery, in 1956 one or rather several Jordanian soldiers opened fire on a group of Israeli archaeologists visiting the excavation sites across the valley at Ramat Rachel, killing Jacob Pinkerfield and another three, and injuring 16.

=== After 1967 ===
During the 1967 Six-Day War, the Israel Defense Forces quickly overran Jordanian defences around the monastery on the way to Bethlehem and Hebron. After 1967, the height, known as Elijah Hill, was renamed in Hebrew as Givat ha'Arba'a (גבעת הארבעה), meaning "Hill of the Four," in honour of the four victims killed in the 1956 incident.

== Description ==
=== Hunt's bench; orchards ===
Facing the monastery is a stone bench erected by the wife of the painter William Holman Hunt (1827–1910), who painted some of his major works at this spot. The bench is inscribed with biblical verses in Hebrew, Greek, Arabic and English.

Since the 4th century, the monks of Mar Elias have cultivated olives and grapes.

== Gallery ==
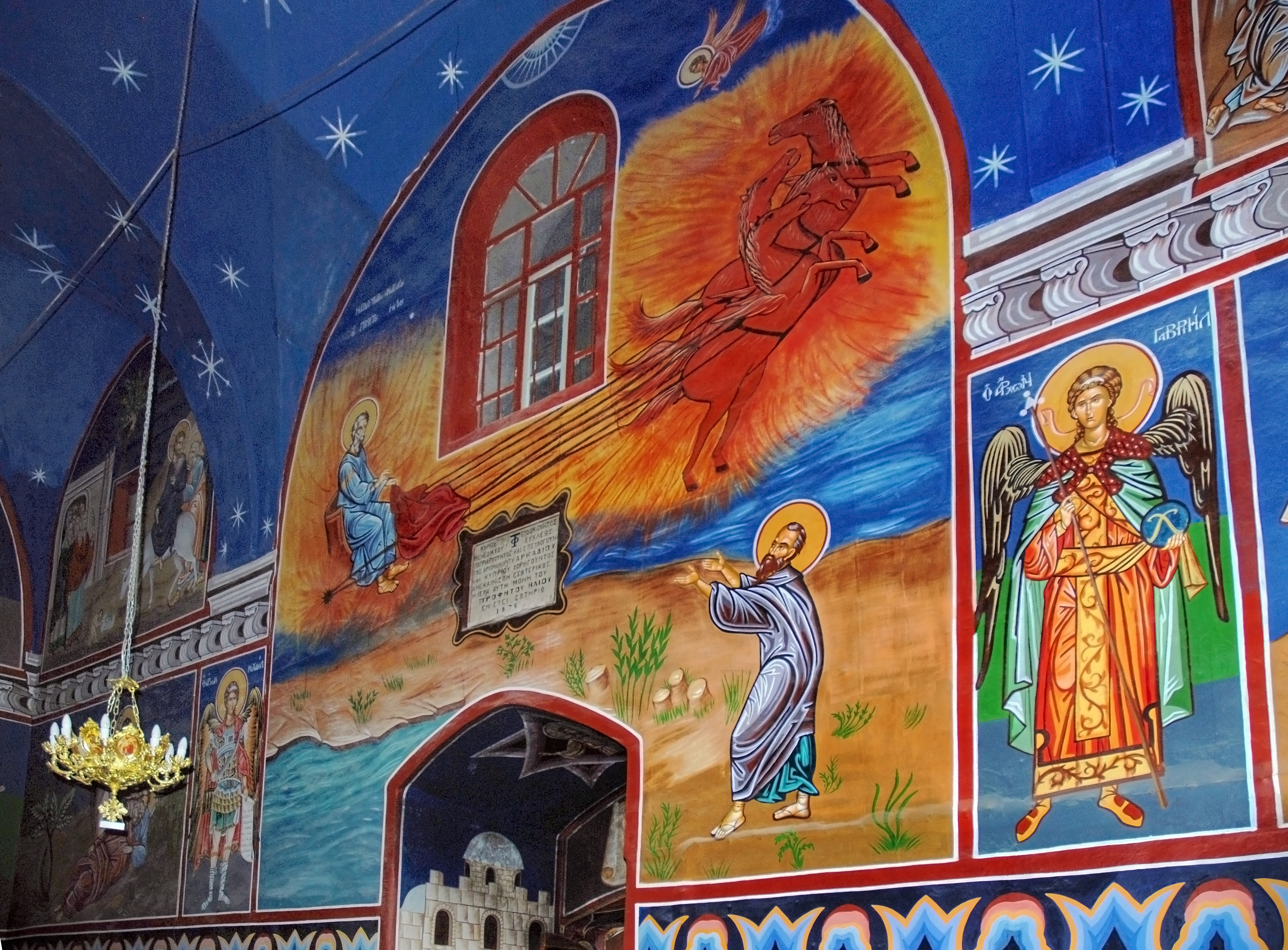

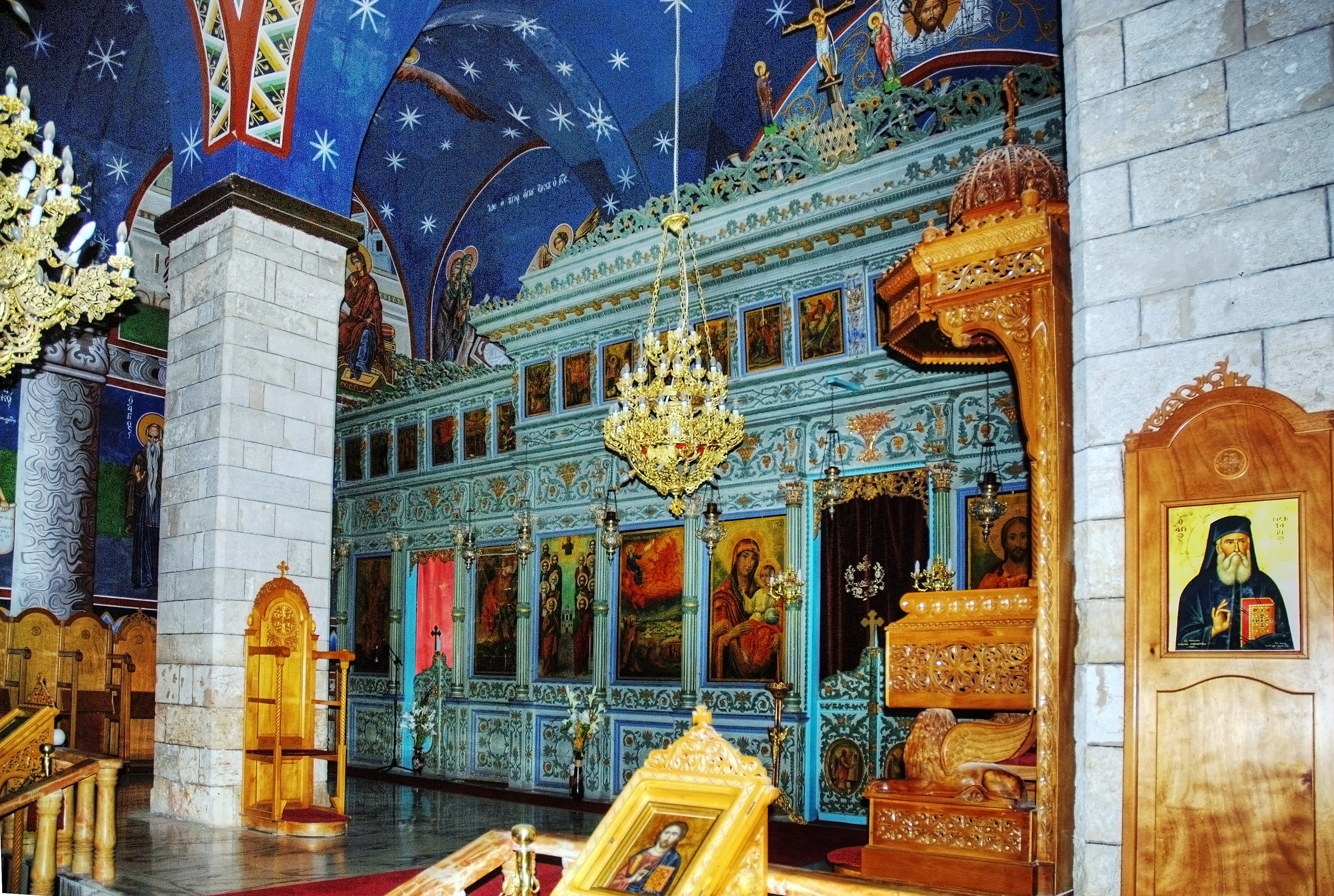

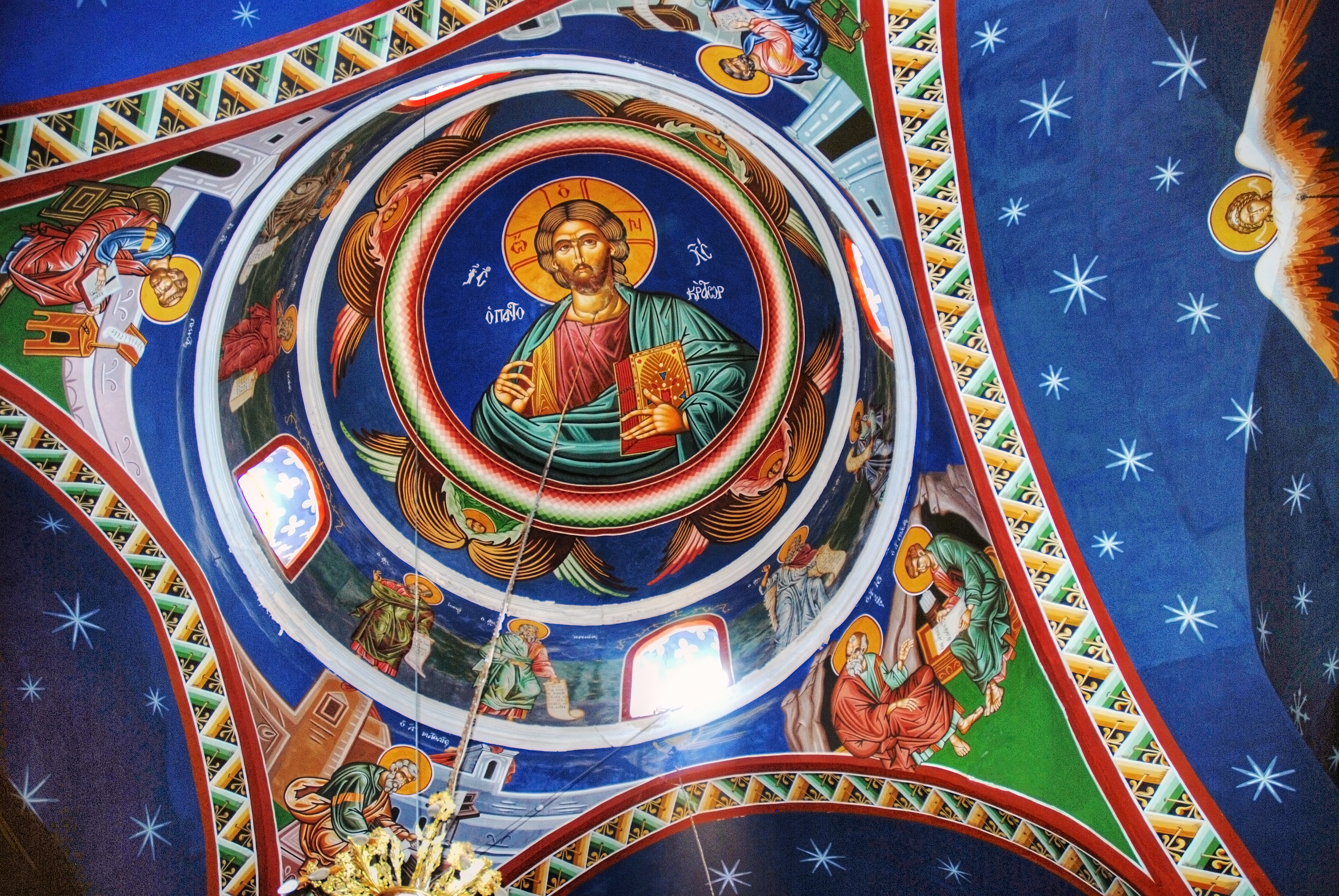

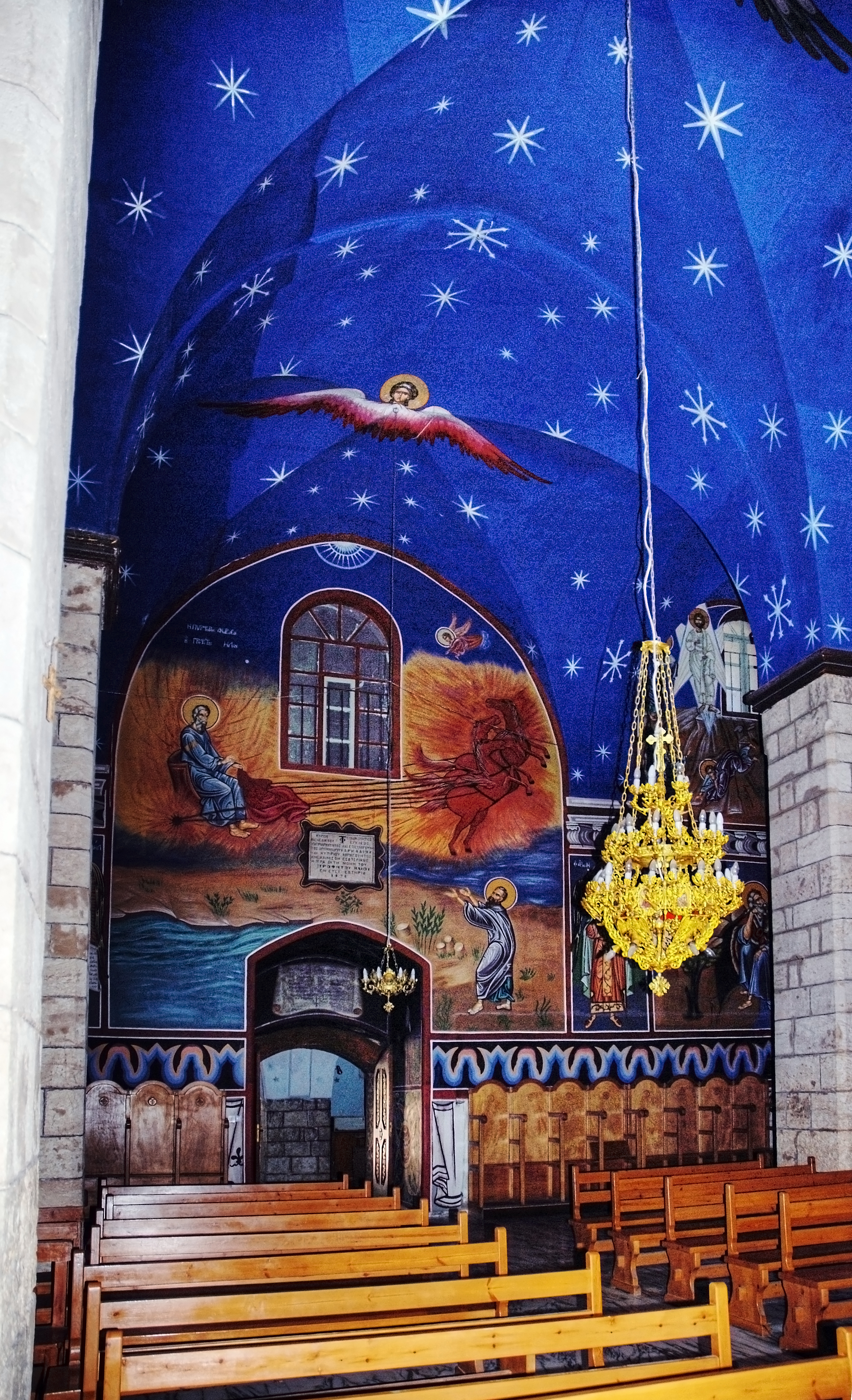

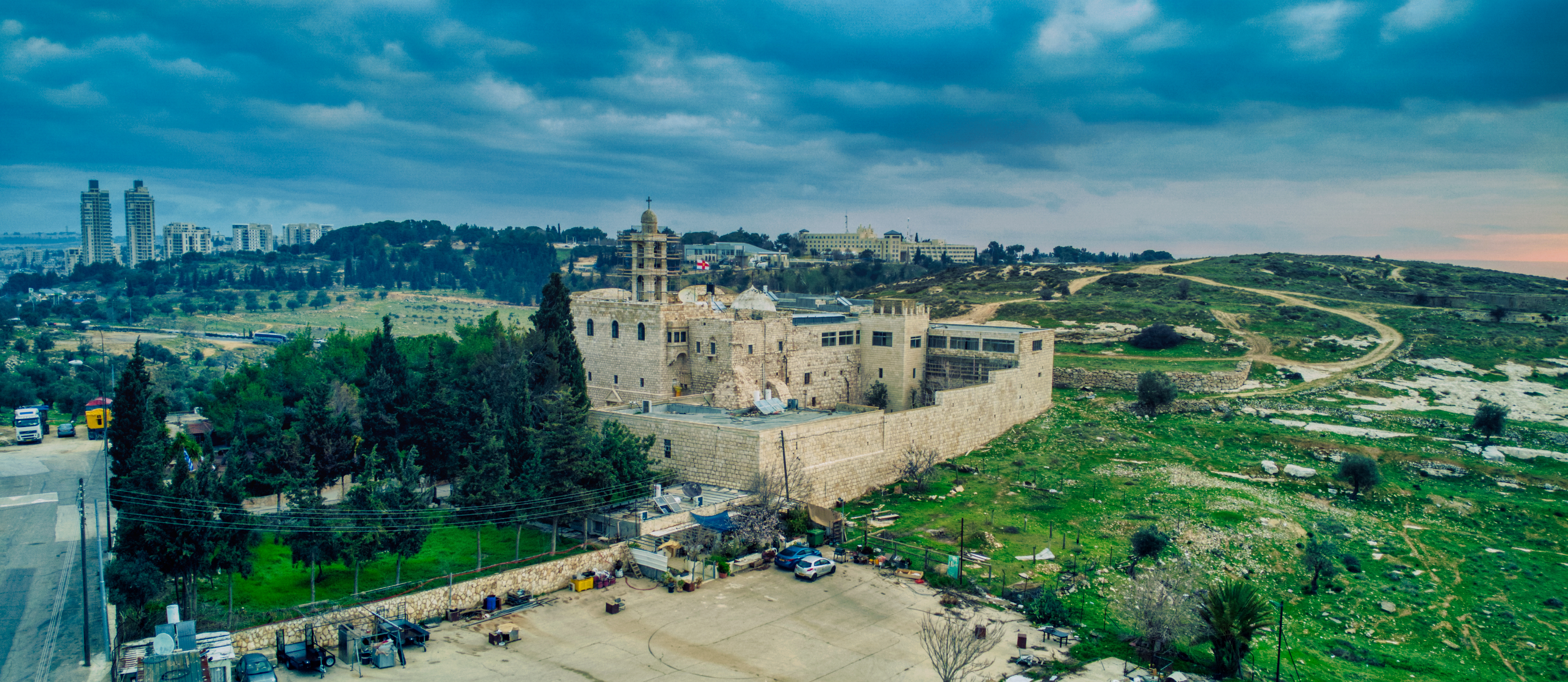

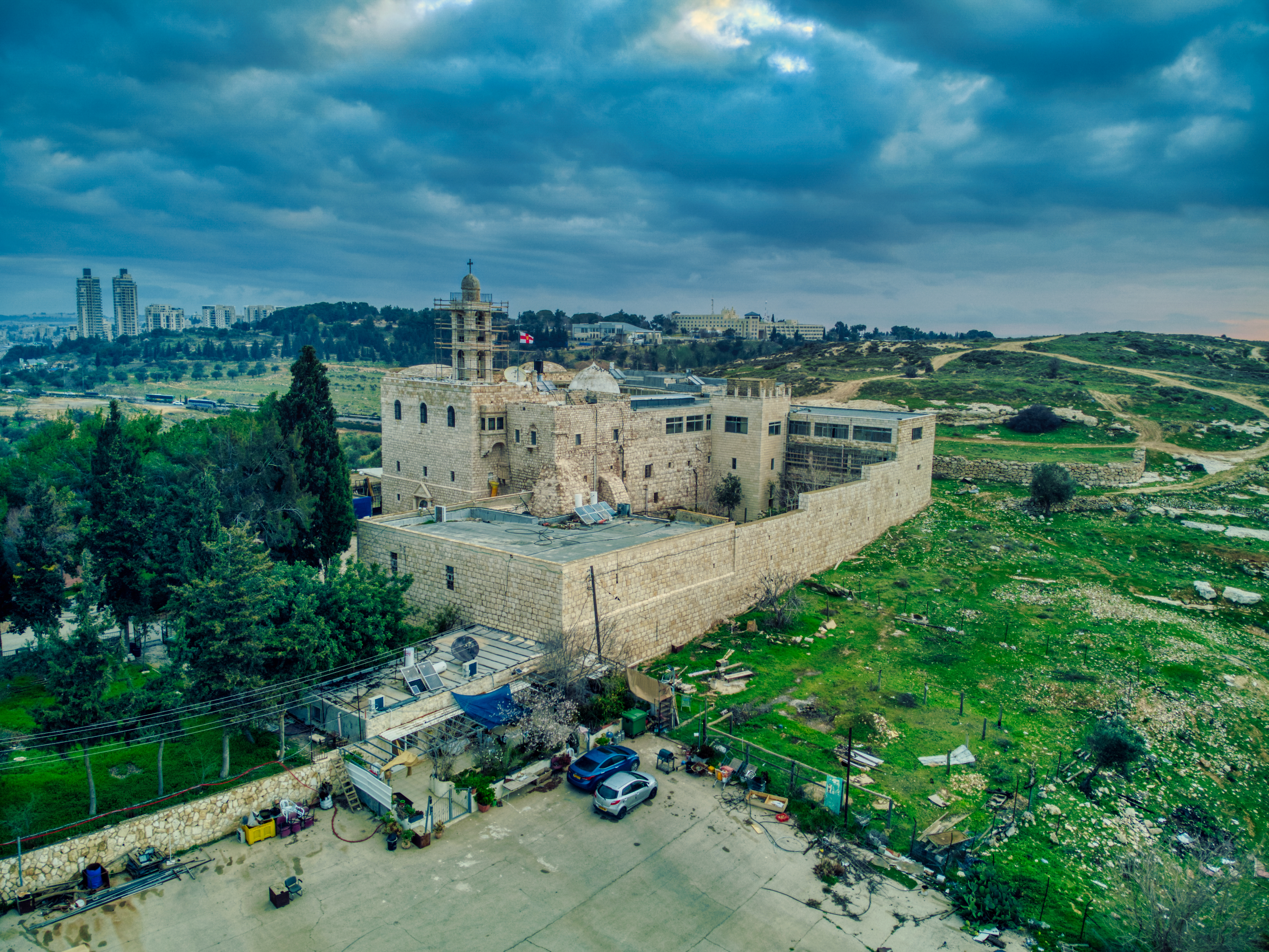

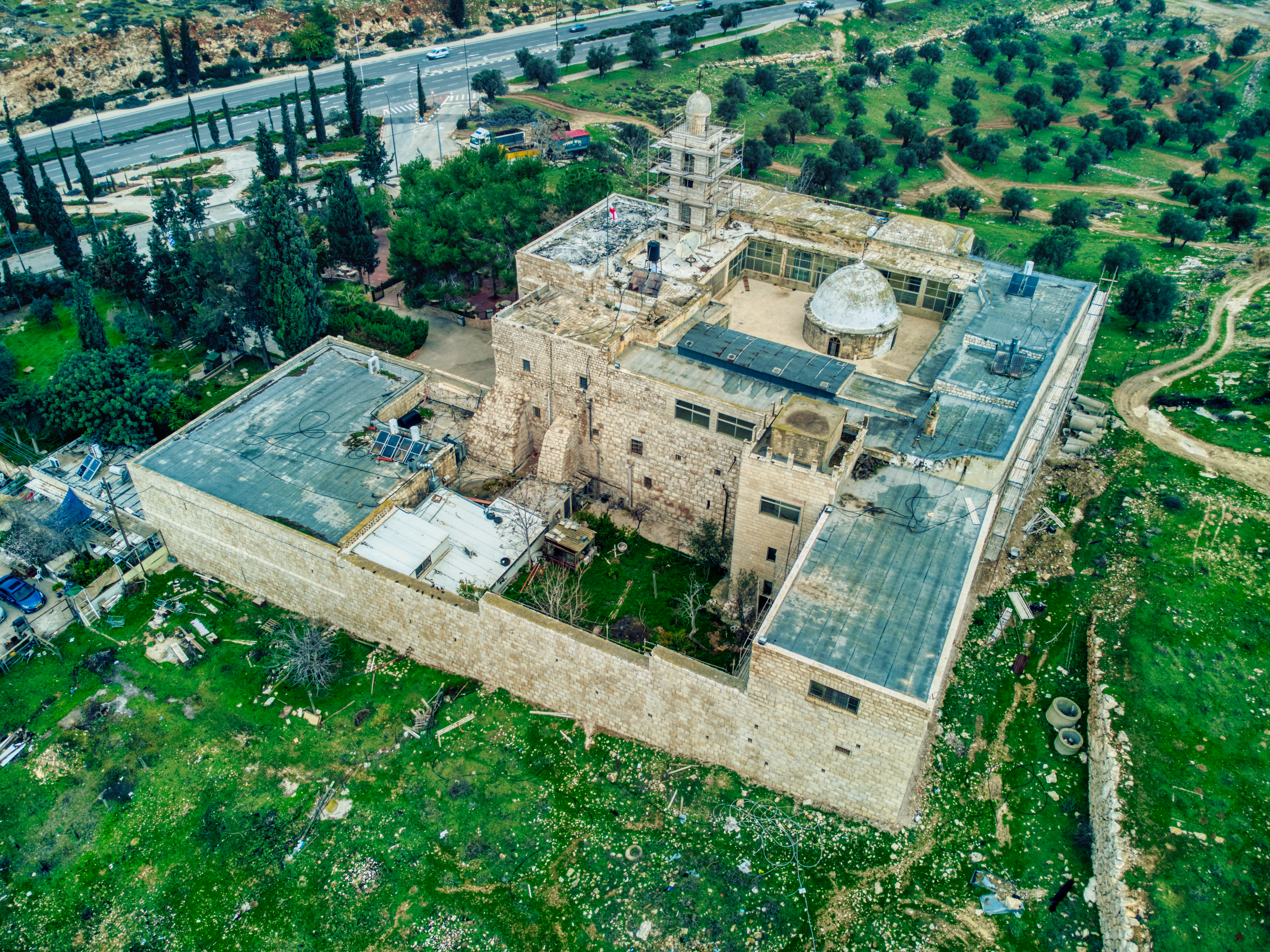

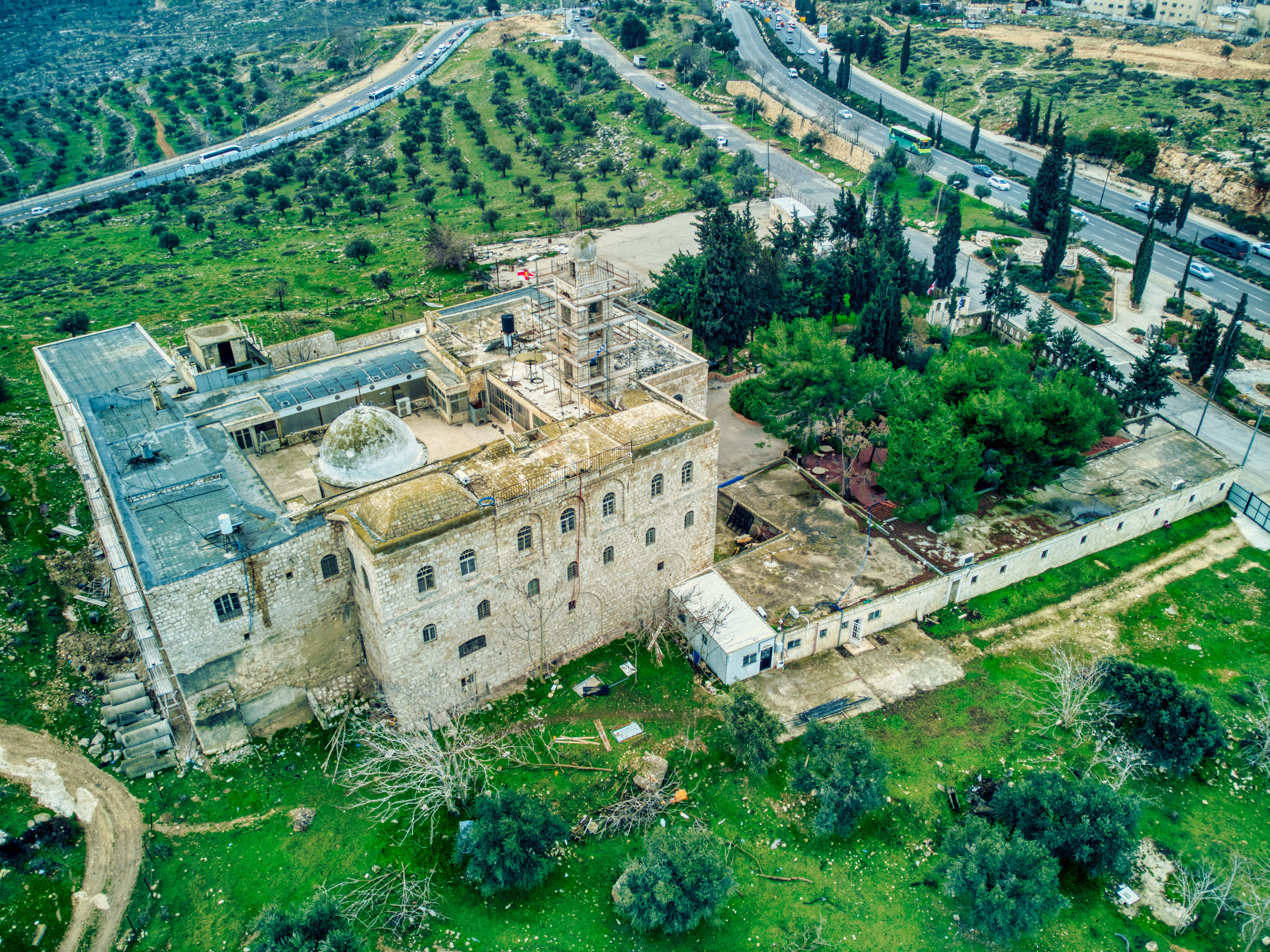

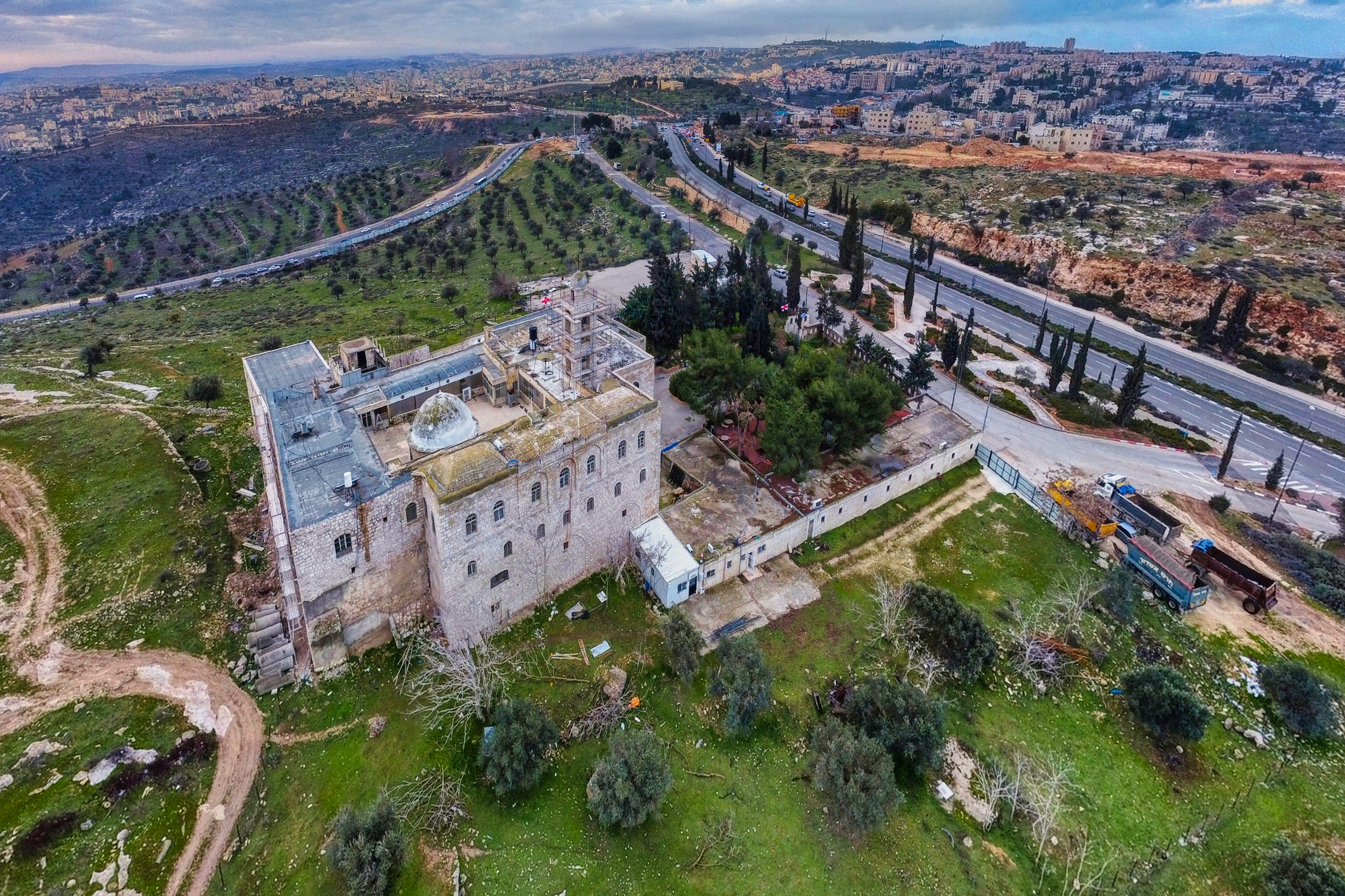

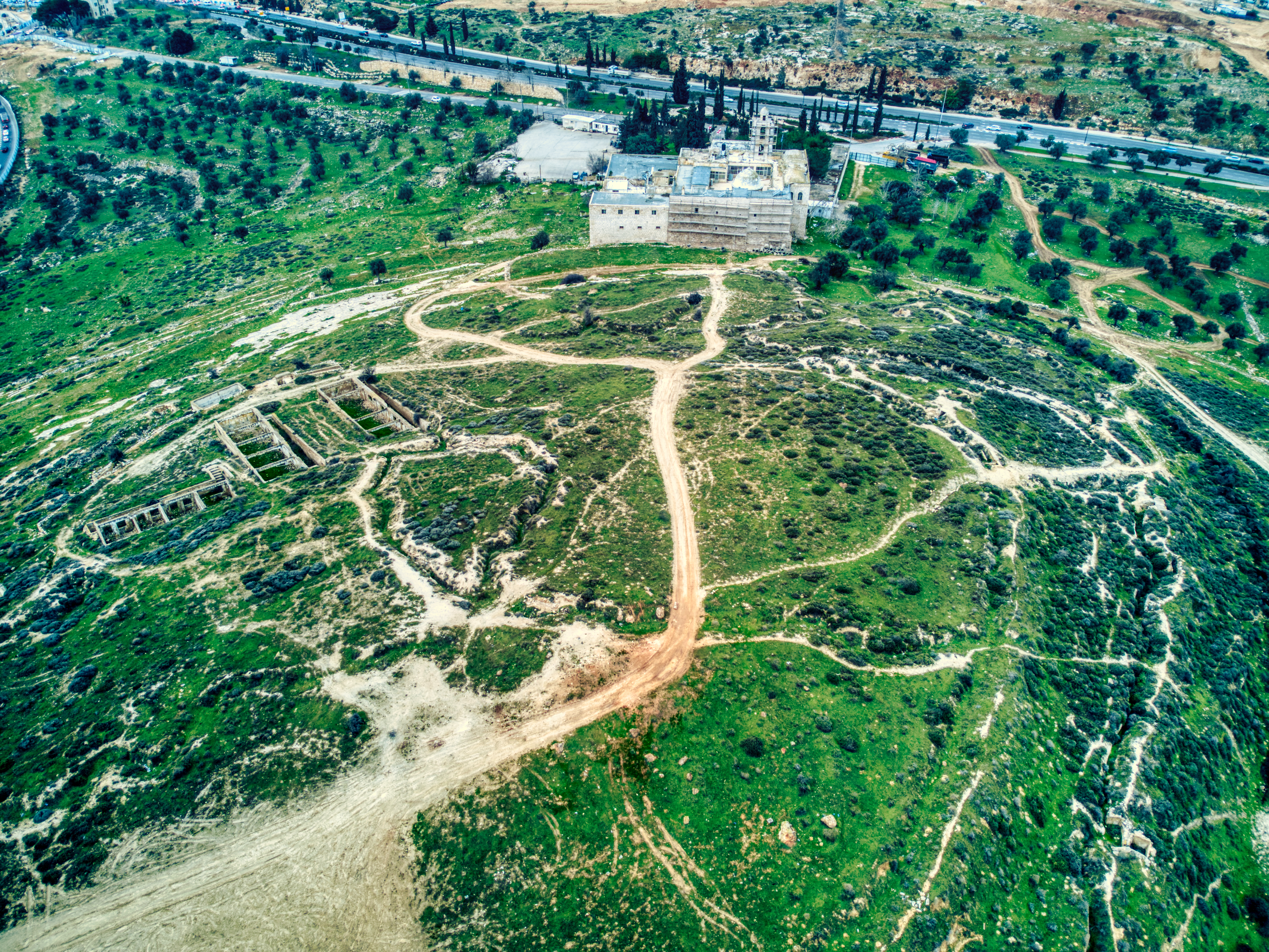

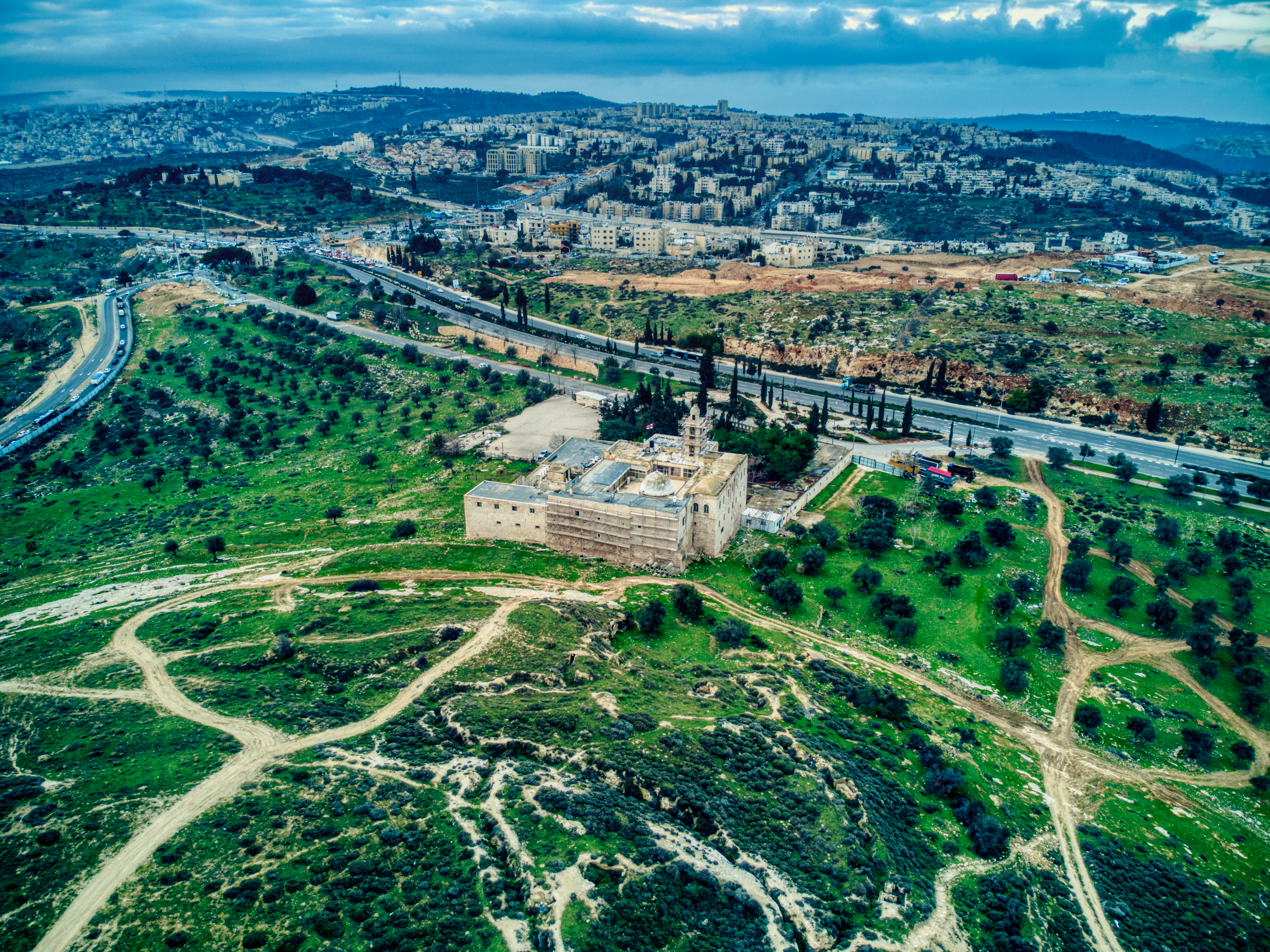

== See also ==
- Christianity in Israel
- Jacob Pinkerfield, architect and archaeologist killed in 1956 by fire opened from Elijah's Hill

== Bibliography ==
- Guérin, V. (1880). Description Géographique Historique et Archéologique de la Palestine (in French). Vol. 3: Galilee, pt. 1. Paris: L'Imprimerie Nationale. (pp. 239−241)
- Jotischky, Andrew (2019). "The Image of the Greek: Western Pilgrims' Views of Eastern Monks and Monasteries in the Holy Land, c.1200–1500". Speculum. 94 (3 (JULY)): 674–703.
- Maundrell, H. (1703). A Journey from Aleppo to Jerusalem: At Easter, A. D. 1697. Oxford: Printed at the Theatre.
- Palmer, E.H. (1881). The Survey of Western Palestine: Arabic and English Name Lists Collected During the Survey by Lieutenants Conder and Kitchener, R. E. Transliterated and Explained by E.H. Palmer. Committee of the Palestine Exploration Fund. (p. 322)
- Phokas, J. (1889). The Pilgrimage of Johannes Phocas in the Holy Land. Palestine Pilgrims' Text Society. (pp. 30-31)
- Pococke, R. (1745). A description of the East, and some other countries. Vol. 2. London: Printed for the author, by W. Bowyer. (pp. 38− 39)
- Poloner, John (1894). John Poloner's description of the Holy Land (ca. A.D. 1421). Palestine Pilgrims' Text Society. (p. 18)
- Pringle, D. (1998). The Churches of the Crusader Kingdom of Jerusalem: L-Z (excluding Tyre). Vol. II. Cambridge University Press. ISBN 0-521-39037-0. pp. 224−226)
- Robinson, E.; Smith, E. (1841). Biblical Researches in Palestine, Mount Sinai and Arabia Petraea: A Journal of Travels in the year 1838. Vol. 3. Boston: Crocker & Brewster. (2nd appendix, p. 122)
- Vogüé, de, M. (1860). Les églises de la Terre Sainte.(p. 340)
- Wilson, C.W., ed. (c. 1881). Picturesque Palestine, Sinai and Egypt. Vol. 1. New York: D. Appleton. (p. 122)
