= Rodionova =

Rodionova is a Slavic female surname that may refer to:

- Alexandra Rodionova (born 1984), Russian luger
- Anastasia Rodionova (born 1982), Russian-Australian tennis player
- Anna Rodionova (born 1996), Russian artistic gymnast
- Arina Rodionova (born 1989), Russian-Australian tennis player, younger sister of Anastasia
- Inga Rodionova (born 1980), pair skater
- Olga Rodionova (born 1975), model, actress and TV presenter
- Tatyana Rodionova (disambiguation) (several people)
- Yuliya Rodionova (born 1990), Olympic freestyle skier from Kazakhstan

== See also ==
- Rodionov, male counterpart
