= Jaffa orange =

Variety of orange fruit

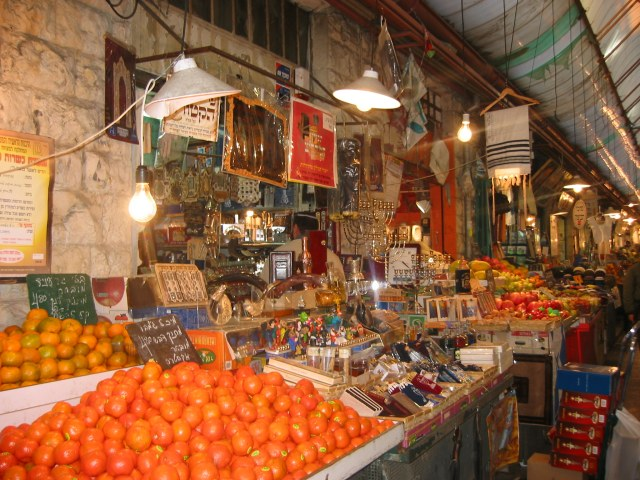
- Jaffa oranges on sale at Mahane Yehuda Market in Jerusalem
- Species: Citrus × sinensis
- Hybrid parentage: 'Baladi' orange × unknown
- Cultivar: 'Jaffa'
- Origin: Ottoman Palestine (region) in mid-19th century (c. 1840s)

The Jaffa orange (Arabic: برتقال يافا; Hebrew: תפוז יפו) is an orange variety with few seeds and a tough skin that make it highly exportable. It was developed by Palestinian farmers in mid-19th century Ottoman Palestine, and takes its name from the city of Jaffa where it was first produced for export. Jaffa oranges are known for their sweet taste.

During the initial Zionist Jewish immigration to Palestine in the late 19th century, the business of maintaining orchards and exporting oranges was an integrated venture of Jews and Arabs based out of the Port of Jaffa. Today, the Jaffa orange is one of three main varieties of the fruit grown in the Mediterranean, alongside the navel and bitter orange. It is cultivated in Palestine, Israel, Cyprus, Iraq, Lebanon, Syria, Jordan and Turkey.

== Characteristics ==
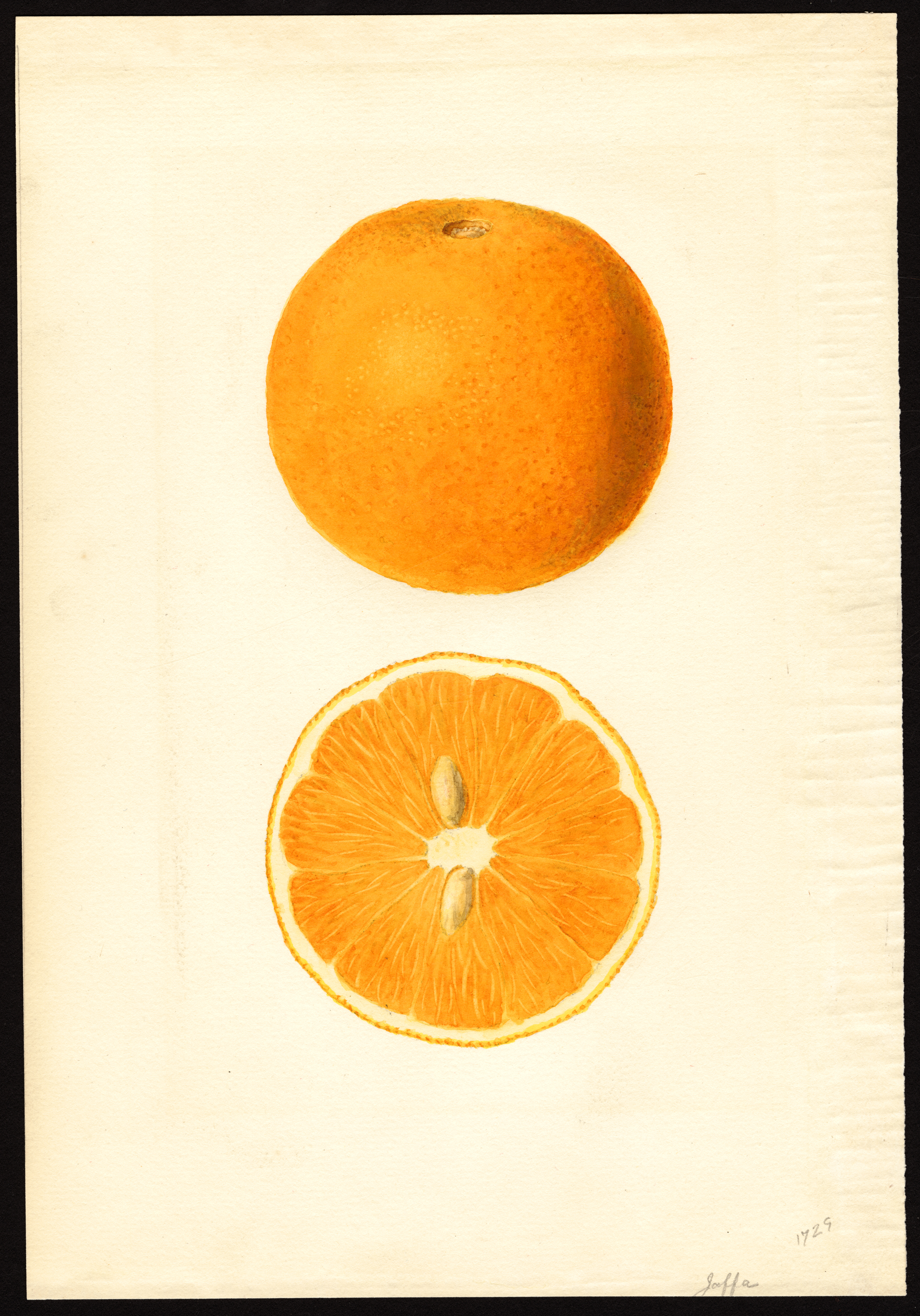
Illustration of a Jaffa orange by J. Marion Shull

Jaffa oranges, also known as shamouti (شموطي), are practically seedless, with a flavour that has been described as "excellent" and "sweet and fine". The two other main orange varieties cultivated in the region are the navel orange and the bitter orange; the latter is grown in Iran for its peel. The Jaffa orange is distinguished by its oval shape and thick peel, which is deep orange in colour and normally very easy to remove from the fruit. Its tough skin makes it "especially suitable for export". As it produces very little juice and has a tendency towards delayed bitterness, it is unsuitable for juice production, although it does store well.

Jaffa oranges are very cold-tolerant, allowing them to grow outside of the subtropical regions normally associated with growing oranges. Jaffa oranges are susceptible to Alternaria, a type of fungus, and are prone to alternate bearing.

== History ==
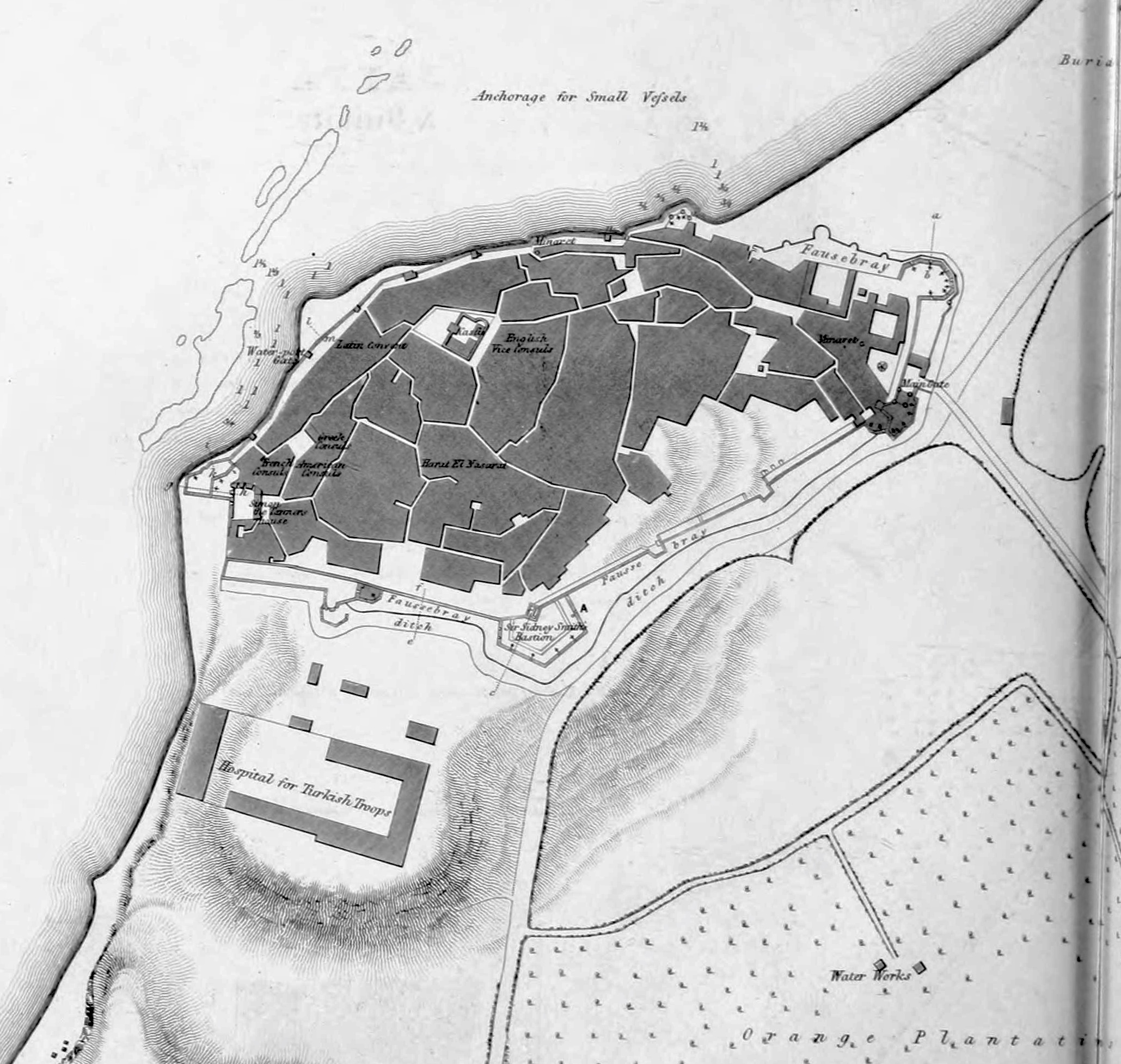
1841 map of Jaffa showing orange plantations

Located at the crossroads between Africa, western Asia, and Europe, the Levant produced a number of commodities for export via imperial and global distribution networks throughout the late Ottoman period (1200–1900 CE). Among these were Nabulsi soap, sugar, barley, oranges, and cotton. Though cotton left was influential throughout the region, the only commodity that remains a symbol of production in Palestine is the Jaffa orange.

The Jaffa orange was a new variety developed by Arab farmers after emerging in the mid-19th century as a mutation on a tree of the 'Baladi' variety near the city of Jaffa. While the sour orange (C. aurantium) was brought westward from China and India by local traders, who may have introduced it to Sicily and Spain, the Jaffa orange was developed from the sweet orange (C. sinensis) which was brought from China to the Mediterranean region by Portuguese explorer Vasco da Gama in 1498.

=== Ottoman period ===
After the Crimean War (1853–56), the most important innovation in local agriculture was the rapid expansion of citrus cultivation. Foremost among the varieties cultivated was the Jaffa (Shamouti) orange, and mention of it being exported to Europe first appears in British consular reports in the 1850s. One factor cited in the growth of the export market was the development of steamships in the first half of the 19th century, which enabled the export of oranges to the European markets in days rather than weeks. Another reason cited for the growth of the industry was the relative lack of European control over the cultivation of oranges compared to cotton, formerly a primary commodity crop of Palestine, but outpaced by the Jaffa orange.

Jaffa Orange brand from Sarona

Exports grew from 200,000 oranges in 1845 to 38 million oranges by 1870. The citrus plantations of this time were primarily owned by wealthy Palestinian merchants and notables, rather than small farmers, as the fruits required large capital investments with no yield for several years. Fruits carrying the "Jaffa" label were first marketed in 1870 by a German Templer colony. An 1872 account of Jaffa by a European traveller notes that "Surrounding Jaffa are the orange gardens for which it is justly extolled, and which are a considerable source of wealth to the owners. The annual value of fruits grown in Jaffa was said to be 10,000 pounds." In the 1880s, American grower H. S. Sanford tried to cultivate the Jaffa orange in Florida.

The prosperity of the orange industry brought increased European interest and involvement in the development of Jaffa oranges. In 1902, a study of the growth of the orange industry by officials outlined the different owners and their primary export markets as England, Turkey, Egypt and Austria-Hungary. While the traditional Arabic cultivation methods were considered "primitive," an in-depth study of the financial expenditure involved reveals that they were ultimately more cost-efficient than the Zionist-European enterprises that followed them some two decades later.

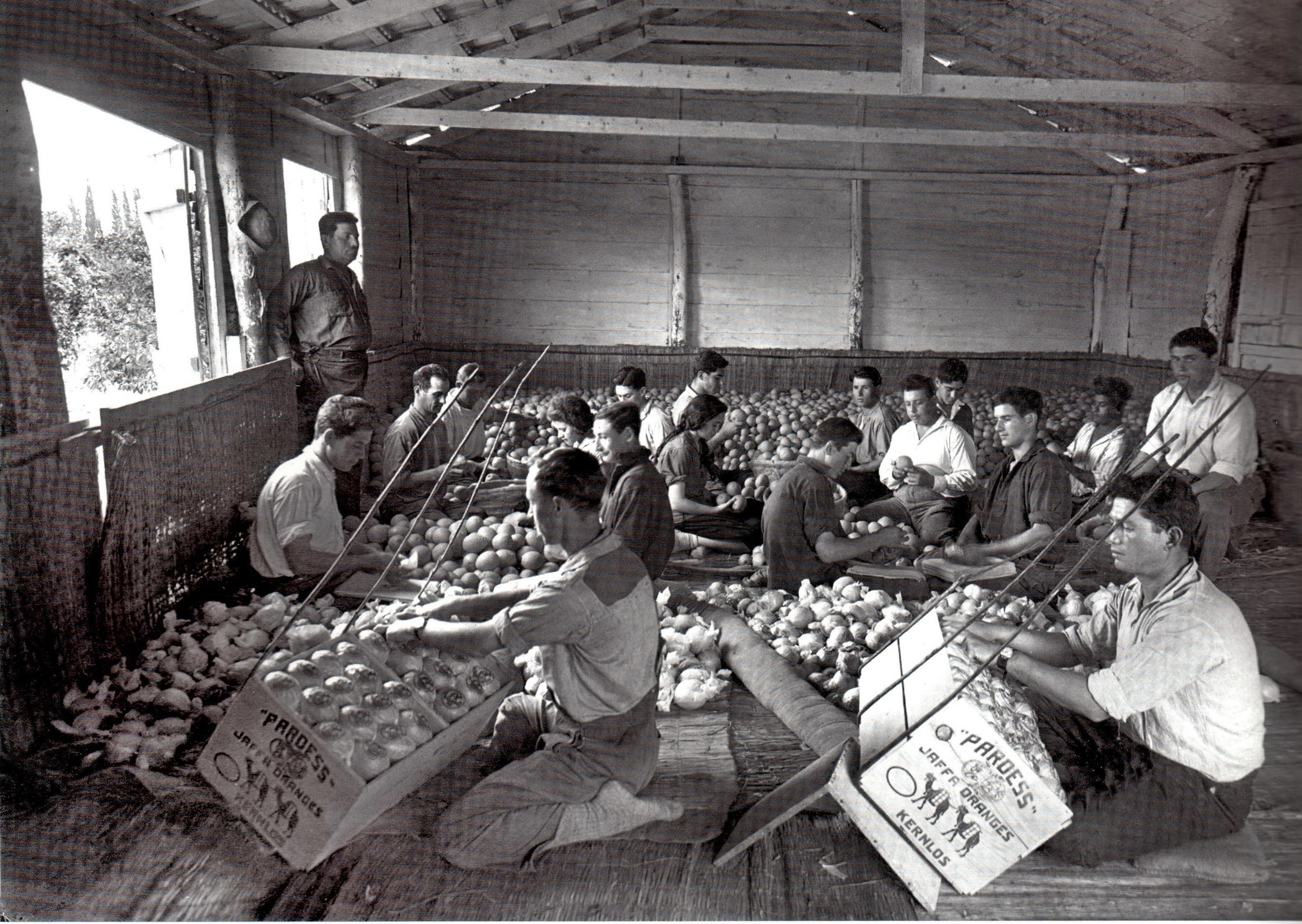
Orange packing, 1921

=== Mandatory Palestine ===
According to the 1930 Hope Simpson Enquiry, "The cultivation of the orange, introduced by the Arabs before the commencement of Jewish settlement, has developed to a very great extent in consequence of that settlement. There is no doubt that the pitch of perfection to which the technique of plantation and cultivation of the orange and grapefruit have been brought in Palestine is due to the scientific methods of the Jewish agriculturist."

Partnerships in growing and exporting these oranges were an example of Arab–Jewish cooperation despite rising political tensions.

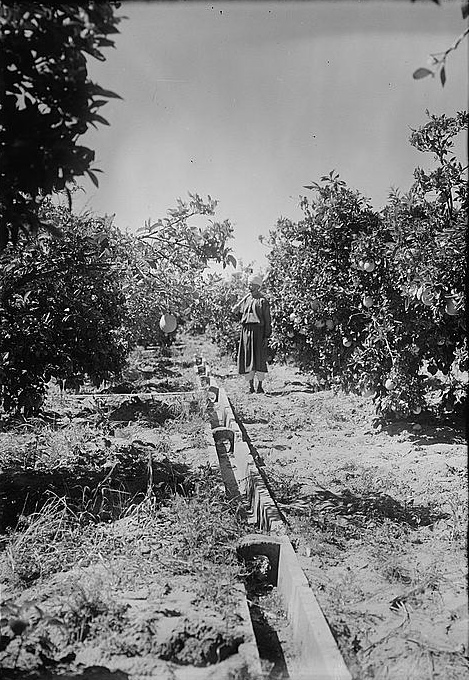
Orange groves at Bir Salim prior to the 1948 war

By the end of 1928, Jews had acquired 3,000 hectares (30,000 dunams) of the region's 6,000 hectares (60,000 dunams) of orange orchards. Whereas before World War I, the price of a dunam of land in a fruitful orange grove was 50–75 pounds sterling, by 1929, the same groves were selling for 150–200 pounds sterling. In 1933, Jewish-owned orange production overtook Arab-owned orange production. By 1939, Jewish-owned and Arab-owned orange orchards in Palestine covered 30,000 hectares (75,000 acres), employed over 100,000 workers, and their produce was a primary export. During World War II (1939–1945) citrus-growing declined, and Arab-owned orange production overtook Jewish-owned production.

=== Post-1948 ===
After the 1948 war, the orange-growing industry was presented as a "pioneering Labor-movement project" which was "void of any Arab presence". Significant ethnic cleansing of Palestinian Arabs by Jewish Zionists occurred following the Nakba between 1947–1948, and the establishment of the Israeli state in 1948. Many Palestinian Arab–owned farms were subsequently taken from their owners as part of dispossession of their lands.

== Legacy ==
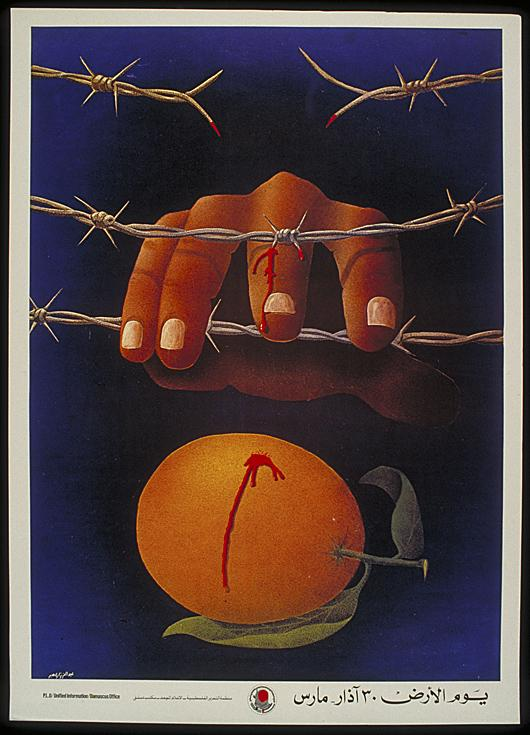
1984 Land Day poster depicting an orange behind barbed wire

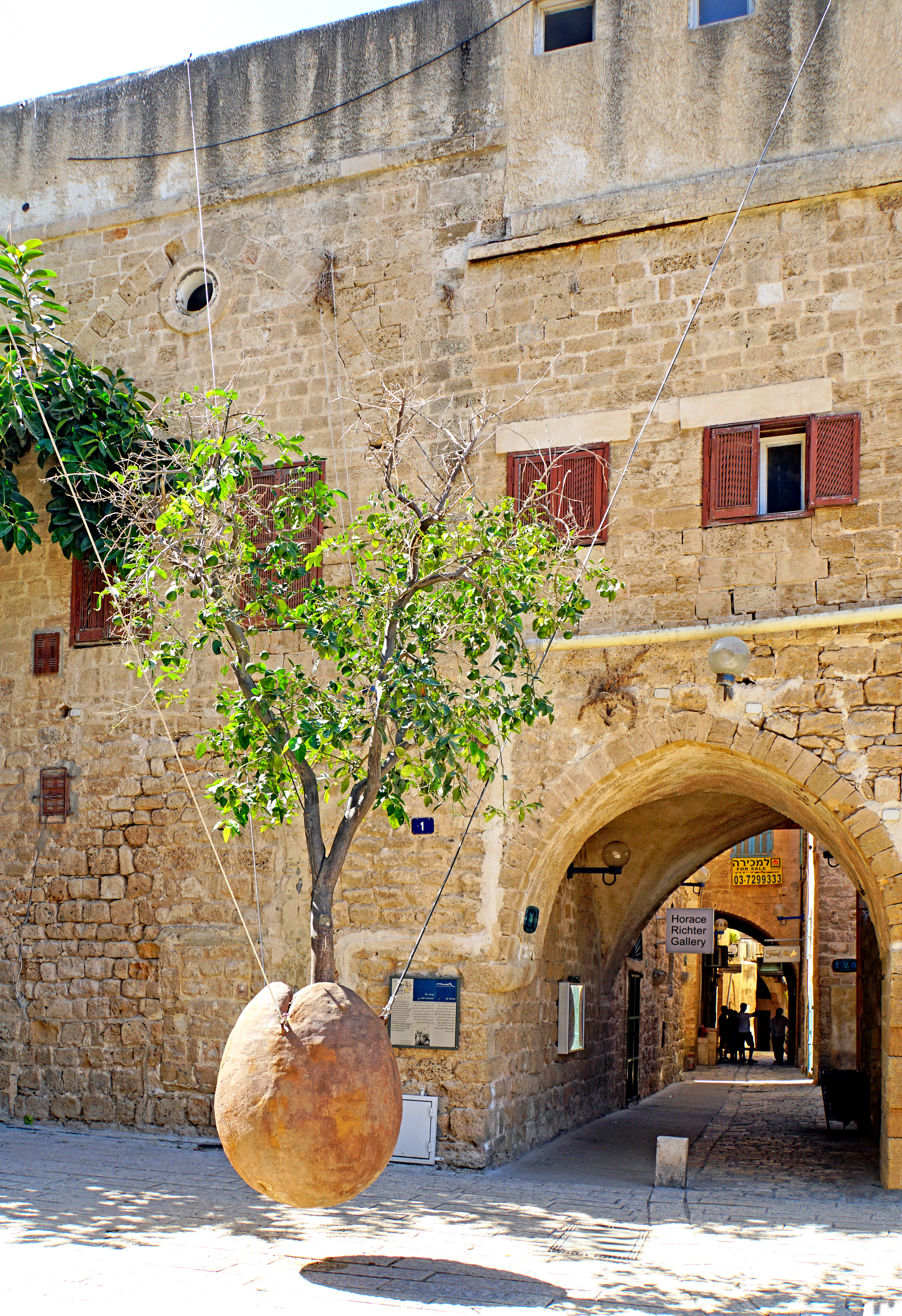
Sculpture in Jaffa: Suspended Orange Tree by Israeli artist Ran Morin

Jaffa oranges are harvested in Israel and the Palestinian territories between November and March, with the marketing season beginning in September and extending through April. More than half the annual crop is exported, and Israel is the main provider of other citrus fruits to the European Union. In the 1950s and 1960s, Jaffa oranges became emblems and symbols of the Israeli state. A general decline in the importance of agriculture to the Israeli economy, extreme limits on available water resources, and the reliance on migrant laborers have reduced productivity. Overshadowed by manufacturing industries, such as diamonds and precision instruments, Israel nonetheless continues to export a large number of citrus fruits to Europe.

Munir Dakak Palestine flag proposal, 1929

The Jaffa orange is also known for lending the city of Tel Aviv-Yafo the nickname "Big Orange".

The orange is also a symbol for Palestinians; The Land of Sad Oranges (Arabic: أرض البرتقال الحزين) is the title of a famous story by Palestinian journalist and writer Ghassan Kanafani, that explores the Nakba through the eyes of a young child who lived and grew up in an orange grove in Palestine. The orange is utilized as a strong symbol for the Palestinians' connection with their lands and the immense losses they suffered.

In 1929, one of 3 proposals for the Palestinian flag submitted by Munir Dakak depicted a Jaffa orange.

== See also ==
- Agriculture in Israel
- Jaffas
- Jaffa Cakes
- Jaffa (drink)

== Bibliography ==
- Aderet, Ofer (2015-06-21). "The forgotten story of the original Jaffa oranges". Haaretz.com.
- Baram, Uzi; Carroll, Lynda (2000). Uzi Baram; Lynda Carroll (eds.). A historical archaeology of the Ottoman Empire: breaking new ground (Illustrated ed.). Springer. ISBN 0-306-46311-3.
- Basan, Ghillie (2007). The Middle Eastern Kitchen. Hippocrene Books. ISBN 978-0-7818-1190-3.
- Derr, Mark (1989). Some kind of paradise: a chronicle of man and the land in Florida (Illustrated ed.). W. Morrow (Original from the University of California). ISBN 0-688-07359-X.
- Gerber, Haim (1982). "Modernization in Nineteenth-Century Palestine: The Role of Foreign Trade". Middle Eastern Studies. 18 (3): 250–264. doi:10.1080/00263208208700509.
- Issawi, Charles (2006). An Economic History of the Middle East and North Africa (Reprint ed.). Taylor & Francis. ISBN 0-415-37998-9.
- Krämer, Gudrun (2008). A history of Palestine: from the Ottoman conquest to the founding of the state of Israel (Illustrated ed.). Princeton University Press. ISBN 978-0-691-11897-0.
- Ladaniya, Milind S. (2008). Citrus fruit: biology, technology and evaluation (Illustrated ed.). Academic Press. ISBN 978-0-12-374130-1.
- LeVine, Mark (2005). Overthrowing geography: Jaffa, Tel Aviv, and the struggle for Palestine, 1880–1948 (Illustrated ed.). University of California Press. ISBN 0-520-23994-6.
- Marshall Cavendish (2006). World and Its Peoples: The Middle East, Western Asia, and Northern Africa (Illustrated ed.). Marshall Cavendish. ISBN 0-7614-7571-0.
- Page, Martin (2008). Growing Citrus: The Essential Gardener's Guide (Illustrated ed.). Timber Press. ISBN 978-0-88192-906-5.
