= Ramat Rachel =

Kibbutz in central Israel

Ramat Rachel: רמת רחל (Hebrew)
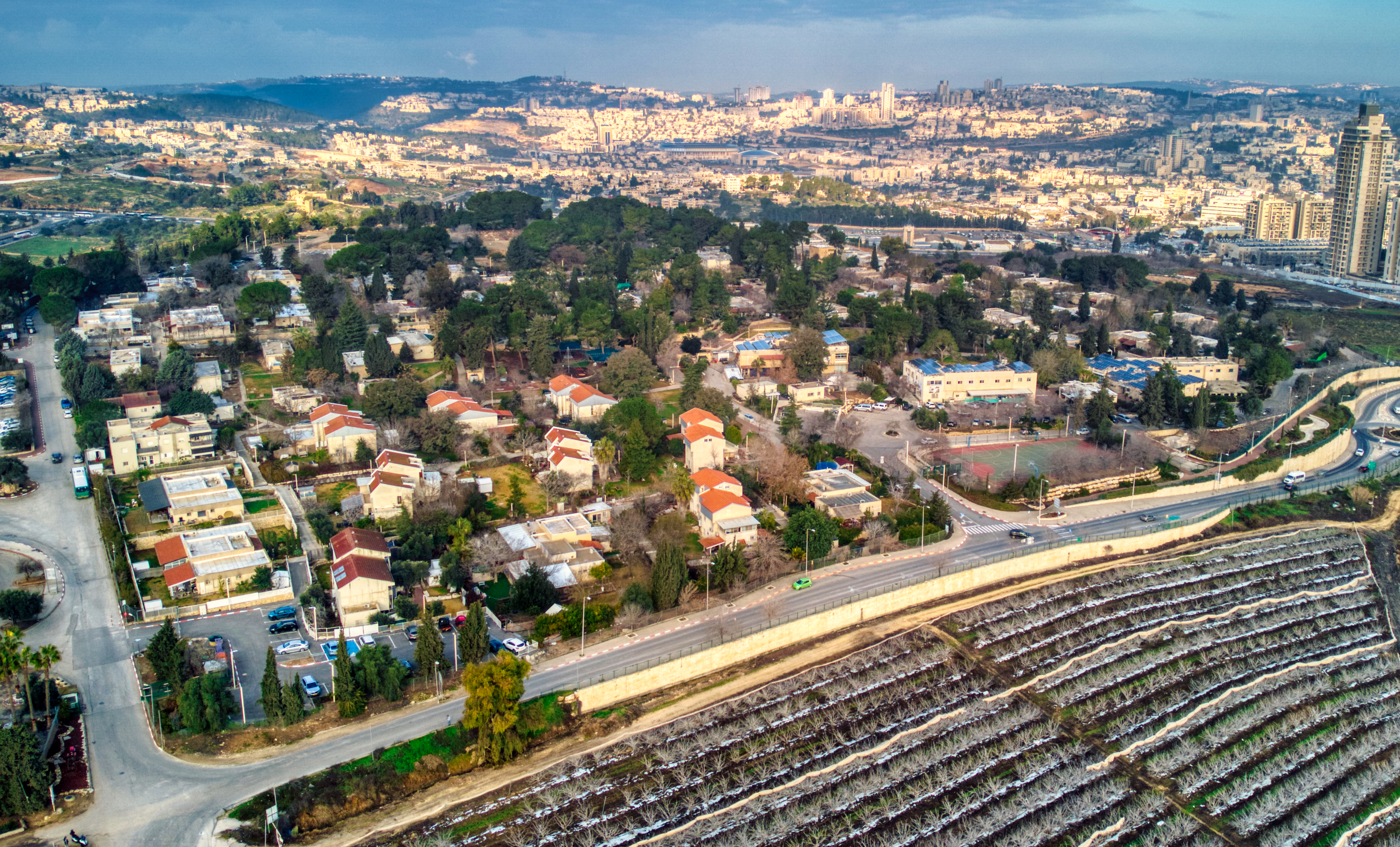
- Etymology: Rachel's Heights
- Location within Jerusalem District Location within Israel
- Coordinates: 31°44′24″N 35°13′8″E
- Country: Israel
- District: Jerusalem
- Council: Mateh Yehuda
- Affiliation: Kibbutz Movement
- Founded: 1926
- Founder: Jerusalem Brigade of Gdud HaAvoda
- Population (2024): 609
- Website: ramatrachel.co.il

Ramat Rachel (Hebrew: רמת רחל, lit. 'Rachel's Heights') is a kibbutz located in central Israel. An enclave within Jerusalem's municipal boundaries, near the neighborhoods Arnona and Talpiot, and overlooking Bethlehem and Rachel's Tomb (for which the kibbutz is named), it falls under the jurisdiction of Mateh Yehuda Regional Council. In 2024, it had a population of 609.

According to archaeologists, Ramat Rachel "replaced Jerusalem as the economic and political hub of the southern highlands" in ancient times.

== History ==
The kibbutz was established in 1926 by members of the Gdud HaAvoda labor brigade. Their goal was to settle in Jerusalem and earn their livelihood from manual labor, working in such trades as stonecutting, housing construction and haulage. After living in a temporary camp in Jerusalem, a group of ten pioneers settled on a stony plot of land on an 803-metre high hill south of the city, which the JNF had purchased from the Greek Orthodox Patriarchate. The kibbutz was destroyed by the Arabs in the riots of 1929. Hundreds of Arabs attacked the training farm and burned it to the ground. The kibbutz members returned to the site a year later. According to a census conducted in 1931 by the British Mandate authorities, Ramat Rachel had a population of 131, in 45 houses.

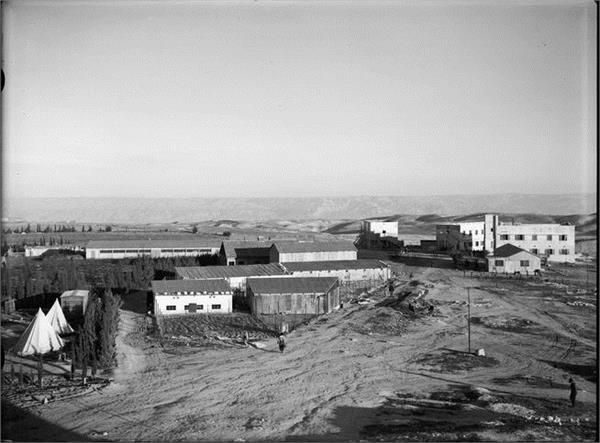
Ramat Rachel, 1937

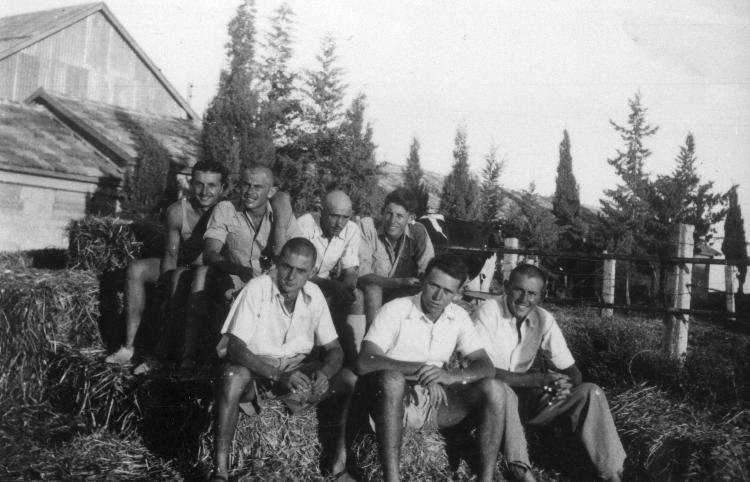
Members of Ramat Rachel, 1944

During the 1948 Arab–Israeli War, it was temporarily cut off from the city.

Ramat Rachel is located near the 1949 armistice border between Israel and Jordan. On 23 September 1956, Jordanian Legion soldiers from positions near the Mar Elias Monastery shot and killed four Israeli archaeologists, including Jacob Pinkerfield, who were working near the kibbutz.

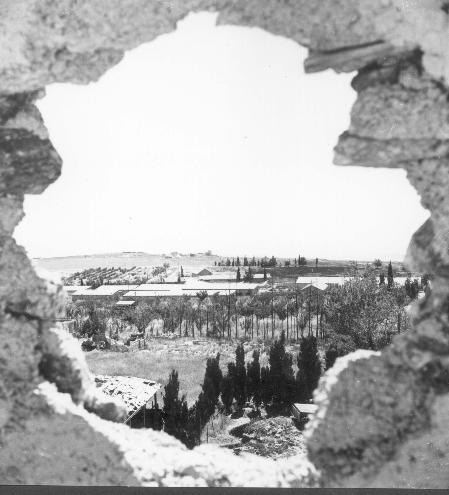
Ramat Rachel, 1948

In 1967, it was the target of intensive artillery shelling from Jordanian positions. As the borders of Jerusalem were expanded southward, the kibbutz was surrounded from all sides by the city's municipal borders. In 1990, the kibbutz had a population of 140 adults and 150 children.

== Economy ==
The kibbutz economy is based on hi-tech, tourism and agriculture.

Hotel Mitzpeh Rachel is the only kibbutz hotel in Jerusalem. The hotel, surrounded by gardens, has 108 rooms with a panoramic view of Bethlehem, the Judean Desert and Herodion. The hotel also operates a convention center, tennis courts and a large swimming pool.

The kibbutz grows cherries, oranges, nectarines, grapefruit, olives, persimmons, figs, pomelos and tangerines.

== Archaeological findings ==
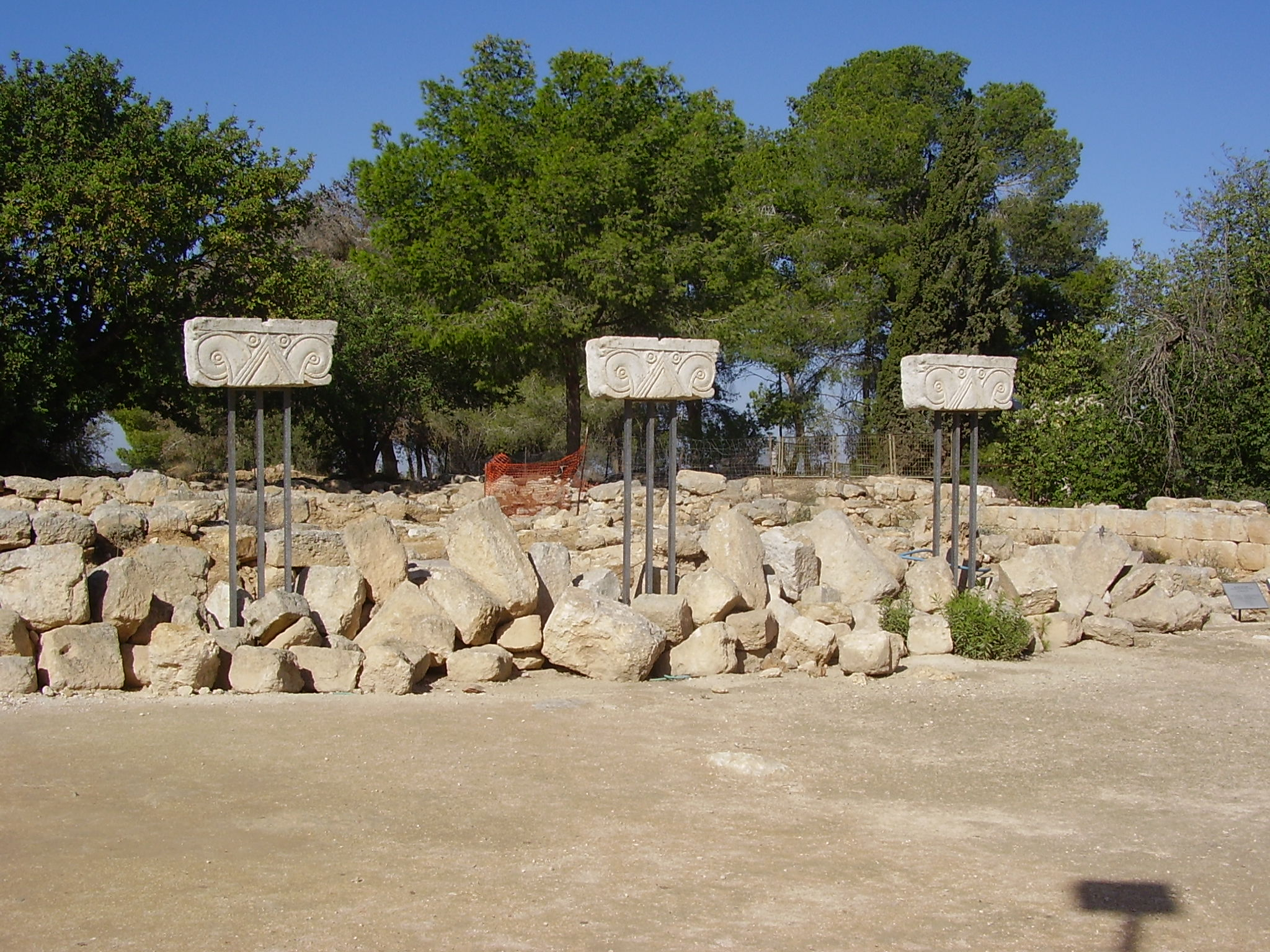
Archaeological garden showing Israelite column capitals

The first scientific exploration of the site, known in Arabic as Khirbet es-Sallah, was conducted by Benjamin Mazar and Moshe Stekelis in 1930–1931. In a series of digs in 1959–1962, Yohanan Aharoni tentatively identified it as the biblical Beit Hakerem (Jeremiah 6:1), one of the places from which flaming warning signals were sent to Jerusalem at the end of the First Temple period. Yigael Yadin dated the palace excavated by Aharoni to the reign of Athaliah and identified it as the "House of Baal" recorded in 2 Kings 11:18.

One of many important artifacts discovered at Ramat Rachel are numerous stamp impressions. Among these are LMLK seal impressions. Archaeologist Gabriel Barkay, who excavated the site in 1984, says the ancient name of the site may have been MMST, the enigmatic fourth word that appears on some of the storage jar handles.

Archaeological excavations resumed in 2004 under the direction of Oded Lipschits (Tel Aviv University) and Manfred Oeming (Heidelberg University). According to Lipschits, the site was a palace or administrative center with a waterworks system "unparalleled in Eretz Israel." Lipschits says agricultural produce was collected there as a source of government tax revenue. A large number of arrowhead finds from the site suggest the presence of a Babylonian garrison during the sixth century BCE, consistent with evidence of its function as a major administrative center during this period.

In July 2008, archeologists discovered a cooking pot from the 1st century CE containing 15 large gold coins. The pot was found under the floor of a columbarium.

In 2023, an ancient Greek tomb was discovered, which is believed to date back to the late 4th century and early 3rd century BCE. It contained the remains of a Greek courtesan (Hetaira) and artifacts, including a rare mirror.

In October 2026, a 2000-year-old Hasmonean lower aqueduct was uncovered near Ramat Rachel. It was part of a water system that transported spring water from the Gush Etzion area to the Temple Mount in Jerusalem by gravity, and it remained in intermittent use until a century ago. About 500 years ago, during the Ottoman period, the system was upgraded with ceramic pipes.

== Sculptures and environmental art ==
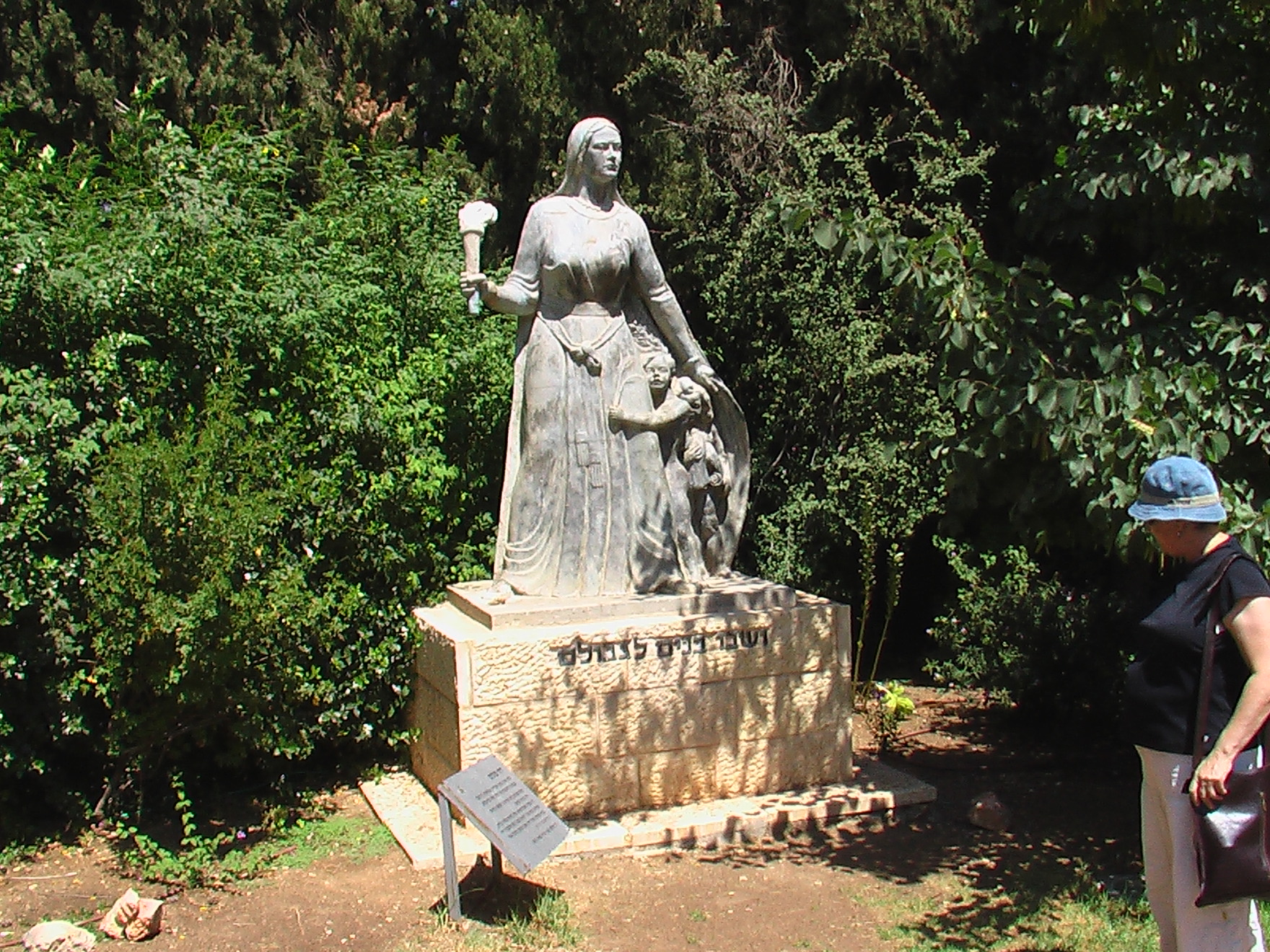
Sculpture of Rachel

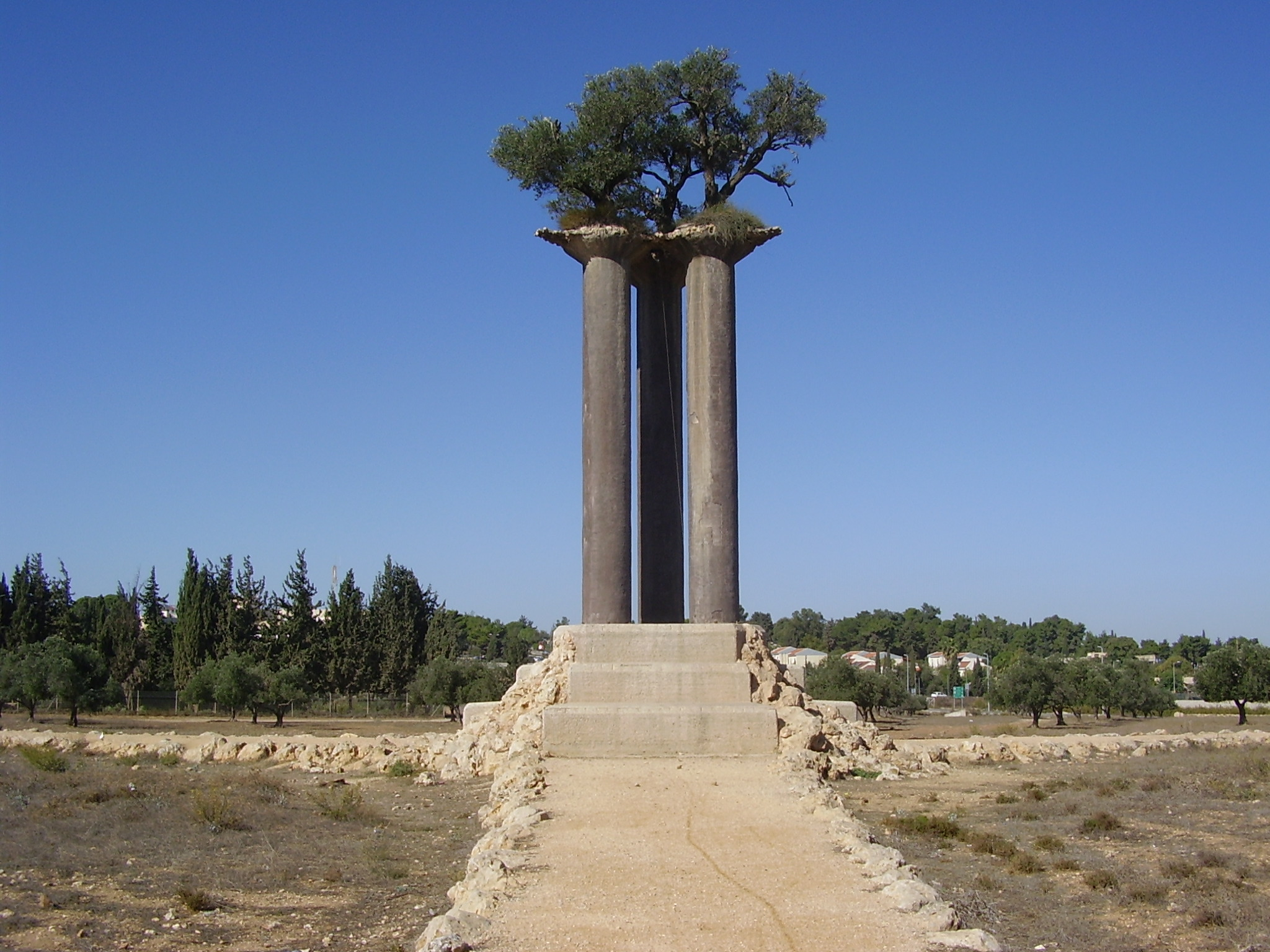
Olive columns sculpture

A grove of 200 olive trees planted on the outskirts of the kibbutz leads up to the Olive Columns, three 33-foot high pedestals topped by live olive trees, the work of Israeli artist Ran Morin.

In the hotel garden is a sculpture of the biblical matriarch Rachel, who personifies the nation. The sculpture is inscribed with a Hebrew Bible verse from Jeremiah 31:17: "Your children will return to their own land." In the Book of Jeremiah, Rachel is depicted as a woman surveying the horizon as though waiting for others.

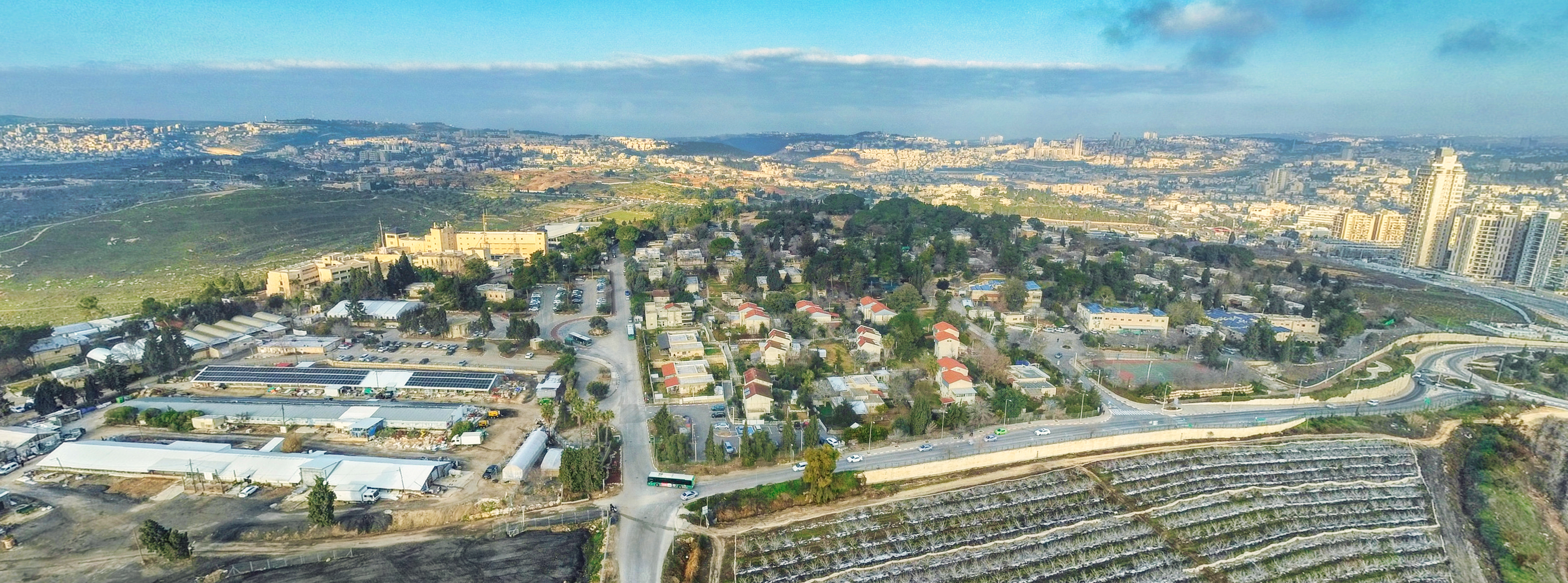
Ramat Rachel panorama

== See also ==
- Archaeology in Israel
- Beit HaKerem (Biblical)
- Discovery of citron pollen
- Tourism in Israel
