= Radion (given name) =

Radion (Russian: Радион) is a Slavic masculine given name of Greek origin. Notable people with the name include:

- Radion Gataullin (born 1965), Soviet and Russian pole vaulter
- Radion Kertanti (born 1971), Slovak wrestler

== See also ==
- Rodion
- Herodion
