= Ramat Rachel shooting attack =

1956 massacre of Israeli civilians by Jordanian soldiers

- Part of Palestinian Fedayeen insurgency
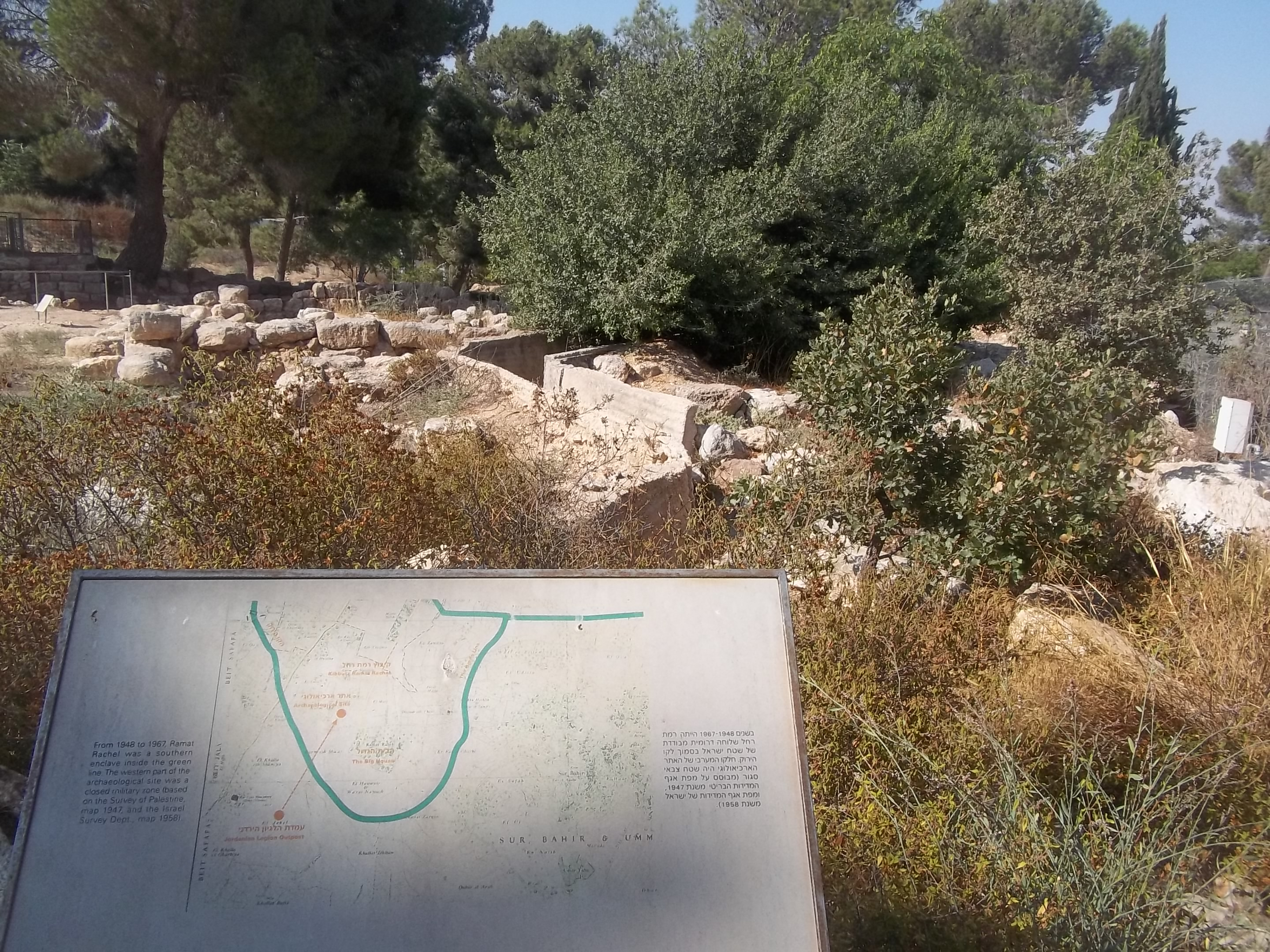

- The attack site
- Native name: פיגוע הירי ברמת רחל
- Location: 31°44′23″N 35°13′01″E; Near Kibbutz Ramat Rachel, Israel
- Date: 23 September 1956; 70 years ago
- Attack type: Mass shooting
- Weapons: Submachine guns, Rifles
- Deaths: 4 Israeli civilians
- Injuries: 16 Israeli civilians
- Assailant: Jordanian Legion soldiers

The Ramat Rachel shooting attack was a mass shooting carried out by Jordanian Legion soldiers, on 23 September 1956, who opened fire across the Israel/Jordan border on a group of Israeli archaeologists working inside Israeli sovereign territory near Kibbutz Ramat Rachel. Four Israeli archaeologists were killed in the event and 16 others were wounded.

== The attack ==
On Sunday, 23 September 1956, a tour was held for a group of Israeli archaeologists at the archaeological excavations near Kibbutz Ramat Rachel. During the tour machine-gun fire was opened on the archaeologists from Jordanian positions at Mar Elias Monastery near the Jerusalem-Bethlehem road. The gunfire killed four people, including the archaeologist Jacob Pinkerfeld, and 16 others were wounded. Another person who was seriously injured in the shooting died eventually of his wounds five years later.

== Official reactions ==
- Jordan: Jordan expressed regret for the incident and blamed a single soldier who was "suddenly taken by madness".
- Israel: Israeli foreign ministry spokesman called Jordan's version completely unfounded, quoting witnesses at the event who stated that two submachine guns and three rifles were clearly seen firing from two Jordanian army outposts across the border at the archaeologists in Ramat Rachel.

== Aftermath ==
In response to the Ramat Rachel shooting attack, the Israeli Defence Forces carried out Operation Lulav on 25 September 1956; the counterattack was held in the Arab village Husan, near Bethlehem. This operation resulted in the deaths of 39 Jordanian soldiers and ten Israeli paratroopers.
