= Rodion Raskolnikov =

Protagonist of Dostoyevsky's Crime and Punishment

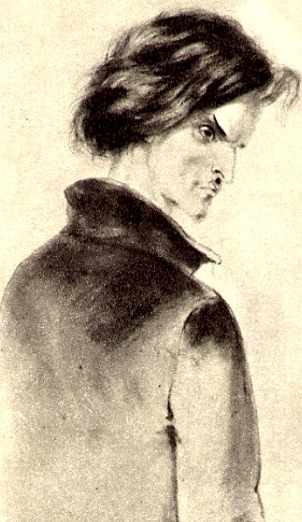
Raskolnikov, drawn by Russian painter Pyotr Boklevsky, 1880s

Rodion Romanovich Raskolnikov (Russian: Родион Романович Раскольников, pre-reform spelling: Родіонъ Романовичъ Раскольниковъ, IPA: [rədʲɪˈon rɐˈmanəvʲɪtɕ rɐˈskolʲnʲɪkəf]) is the fictional protagonist of the 1866 novel Crime and Punishment by Fyodor Dostoyevsky. The name Raskolnikov derives from the Russian raskolnik meaning "schismatic" (traditionally referring to a member of the Old Believer movement). The name Rodion comes from Greek and indicates an inhabitant of Rhodes.

Raskolnikov is a young ex-law student living in extreme poverty in Saint Petersburg. He lives in a tiny garret which he rents, although due to a lack of funds has been avoiding payment for quite some time. He sleeps on a couch using old clothes as a pillow, and due to lack of money eats very rarely. He is handsome and intelligent, though generally disliked by fellow students. He is devoted to his sister (Avdotya Romanovna Raskolnikova) and his mother (Pulkheria Alexandrovna Raskolnikova).

== Plot ==
An impoverished student with a conflicted idea of himself, Raskolnikov (Rodya as his mother calls him) decides to kill a corrupt pawnbroker, Alyona Ivanovna, with whom he has been dealing, with the idea of using the money to start his life all over, and to help those who are in need of it. It is later revealed that he also commits the murder as justification for his pride, as he wants to prove that he is "exceptional" and can transgress the moral law against the act of murder in the way Napoleon did. He commits the murder, however also kills Lizaveta Ivanovna (the old pawnbroker's sister whom she mistreats) upon her witnessing the murder, which directly betrays Raskolnikov's moral justification of killing for the greater good. Raskolnikov then finds a small purse on Alyona Ivanovna's body, which he hides under a rock without checking its contents.

He has also been troubled by a letter his mother from the province sent to him about his sister Dunya accepting Pyotr Petrovitch Luzhin (a wealthy-looking and well presented lawyer)'s marriage proposal. His mother claims he can get Raskolnikov a position at a firm, as well as lift his family out of the poverty they're experiencing, however Raskolnikov sees this as Dunya selling herself, and compares this to Sonia (the daughter of a troubled alcoholic Semyon Zakharovich Marmeladov), who was forced into prostitution to lift her family out of poverty. This later strains the relationship between Raskolnikov and his sister's fiance, which Raskolnikov insultingly mentions the fact that Luzhin said that he chose Dunya because she was in poverty and would look at him as her beneficiary, the main reason why Raskolnikov isn't approving of their marriage.

After he confesses his crime to the destitute, pious prostitute Sofya Semyonovna Marmeladova, she guides him towards turning himself in to the police. Raskolnikov is sentenced to exile in Siberia, accompanied by Sofya Semyonovna, where he experiences a psychological and spiritual rebirth.

== Cinema and television ==
In film, Raskolnikov was portrayed for the first time by Derwent Hall Caine in the 1917 silent film directed by Lawrence B. McGill. Gregori Chmara portrayed him in another silent adaptation Raskolnikov, directed by Robert Wiene (1923). He was portrayed by Peter Lorre in Josef von Sternberg's Hollywood film version (1935), by John Hurt in a 1979 BBC mini-series adaptation, by Patrick Dempsey in a 1998 television movie, and by Georgy Taratorkin (1969), John Simm (2002), and Crispin Glover (2002). The character of Michel in Robert Bresson's Pickpocket (1959) is based on Raskolnikov. Paul Schrader, who wrote Taxi Driver (1976), was in turn inspired by Bresson's Michel character to create Travis Bickle, Robert De Niro's antihero. Woody Allen's 2005 British psychological thriller Match Point is partly intended as a debate with Crime and Punishment: protagonist Chris Wilton (Jonathan Rhys Meyers) is seen early on reading the book and identifying with Raskolnikov, and ultimately murders two people, a crime for which he narrowly escapes justice.
