= Jacob Pinkerfield =

Israeli archaeologist and architect (1897–1956)

- יעקב פינקרפלד
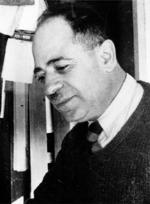
- Born: 1897; Przemyśl, Kingdom of Galicia and Lodomeria, Austro-Hungarian Empire (now Poland)
- Died: 23 September 1956 (aged 58–59); Ramat Rachel, Jerusalem District, Israel
- Cause of death: Murdered by Jordanian soldiers in the Ramat Rachel shooting attack
- Education: Vienna University of Technology
- Occupations: Archaeologist; architect

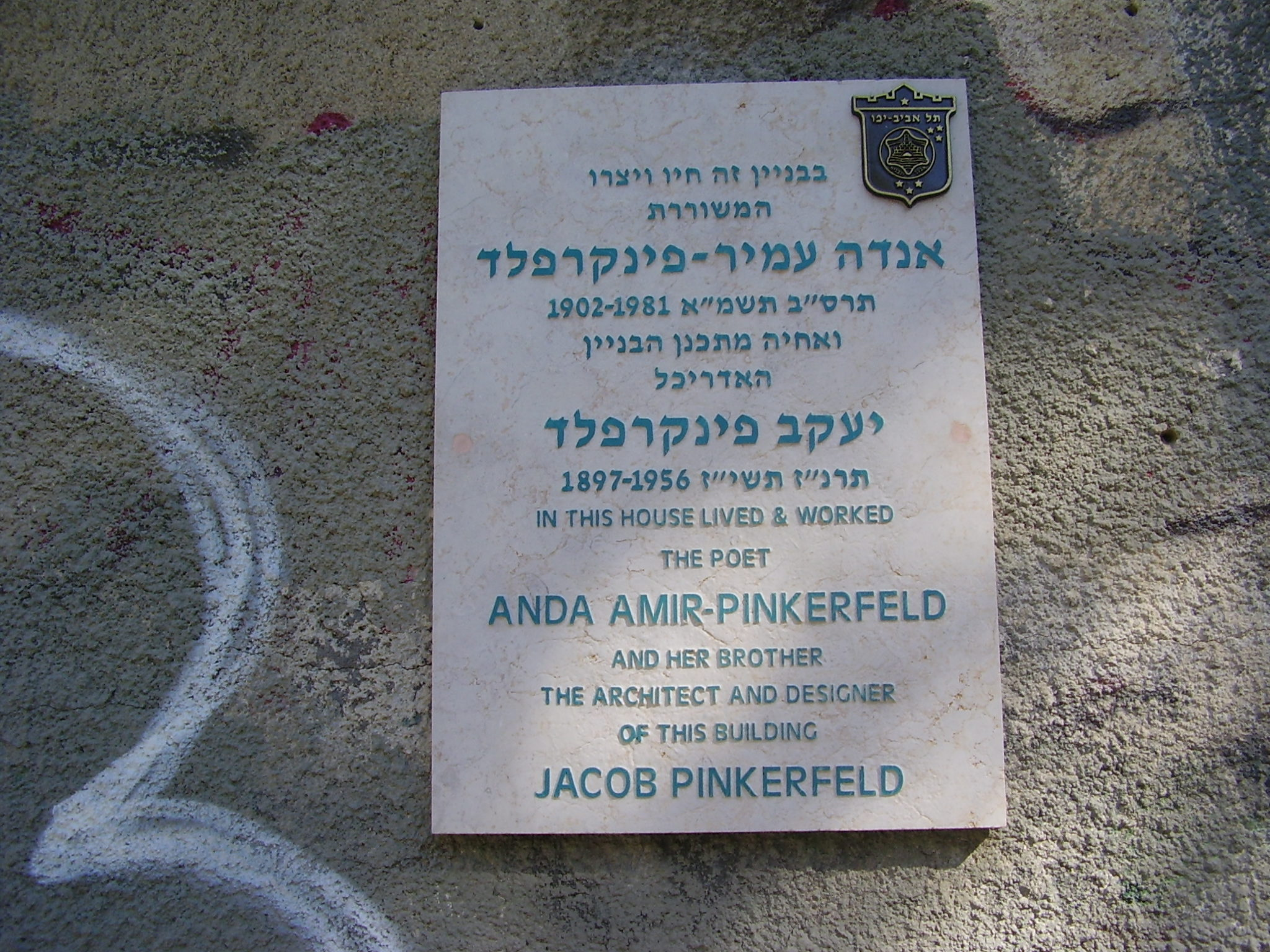
The Anda Pinkerfeld house in Tel Aviv where the writer Anda Pinkerfeld - Amir and her brother, the architect Jacob Pinkerfeld lived and created.

Jacob Pinkerfield (Note: Also spelled Pinkerfeld.) (Hebrew: יעקב פינקרפלד; 1897 – 23 September 1956) was an Israeli archaeologist and architect.

== Biography ==
Pinkerfeld was born in Przemyśl, modern-day Poland, in 1897. He joined Hashomer Hatzair in his youth and later studied architecture at the College of Technology in the city of Vienna. In 1920, Pinkerfeld briefly moved to Mandatory Palestine, where he lived with the Yishuv in Zikhron Ya'akov. He later moved back to Europe to recover from malaria and pneumonia, and soon graduated as an engineer-architect in 1925. That year, Pinkerfeld made aliyah.

=== Architecture ===
Pinkerfeld worked as an architect and designer, building a large number of public structures. According to the Artlog website, "his dream was to establish a Research Institute for Jewish Art. Together with a group of friends he founded "Ganza", the Society for Jewish Craft, which later became the Museum of Ethnography and Folklore in Tel Aviv, and acted as its Director from 1950 until his death.

=== Archaeology ===
He worked on excavations at de:Tell el-Kheleifeh, which Nelson Glueck at the time had mistakenly identified as Solomon's Ezion-geber, and at the putative site of the Church of Zion on Mount Zion in Jerusalem, his findings forming the basis of Bargil Pixner's thesis of a pre-Crusader Jewish-Christian church on the site. The archaeologist John Winter Crowfoot paid tribute to him in The Objects from Samaria, the final volume to emerge from the Joint Expedition at Samaria which teams from Harvard University, the Hebrew University in Jerusalem, the Palestine Exploration Fund, the British Academy, and the British School of Archaeology in Jerusalem (BSAJ) had conducted in the early 1930s.

== Death ==
Pinkerfeld was one of four Israeli archaeologists killed by Jordanian Legion soldiers in the Ramat Rachel shooting attack on 23 September 1956.

== Published works ==
- The Synagogues of Eretz YIsrael. (Hebrew) Rabbi Kook Institute (1945/1946)
- The Synagogues of Italy. (Hebrew) Bialik Institute; (1954)
- Bishvili Omanut Yehudit: Sefer Zichron (Hebrew) (1957)
- The Synagogues of North Africa. (Hebrew) Bialik Institute (1974)
- Jerusalem: Synagogues and the Karaite Community.
