= Ran Morin =

Israeli artist (born 1958)

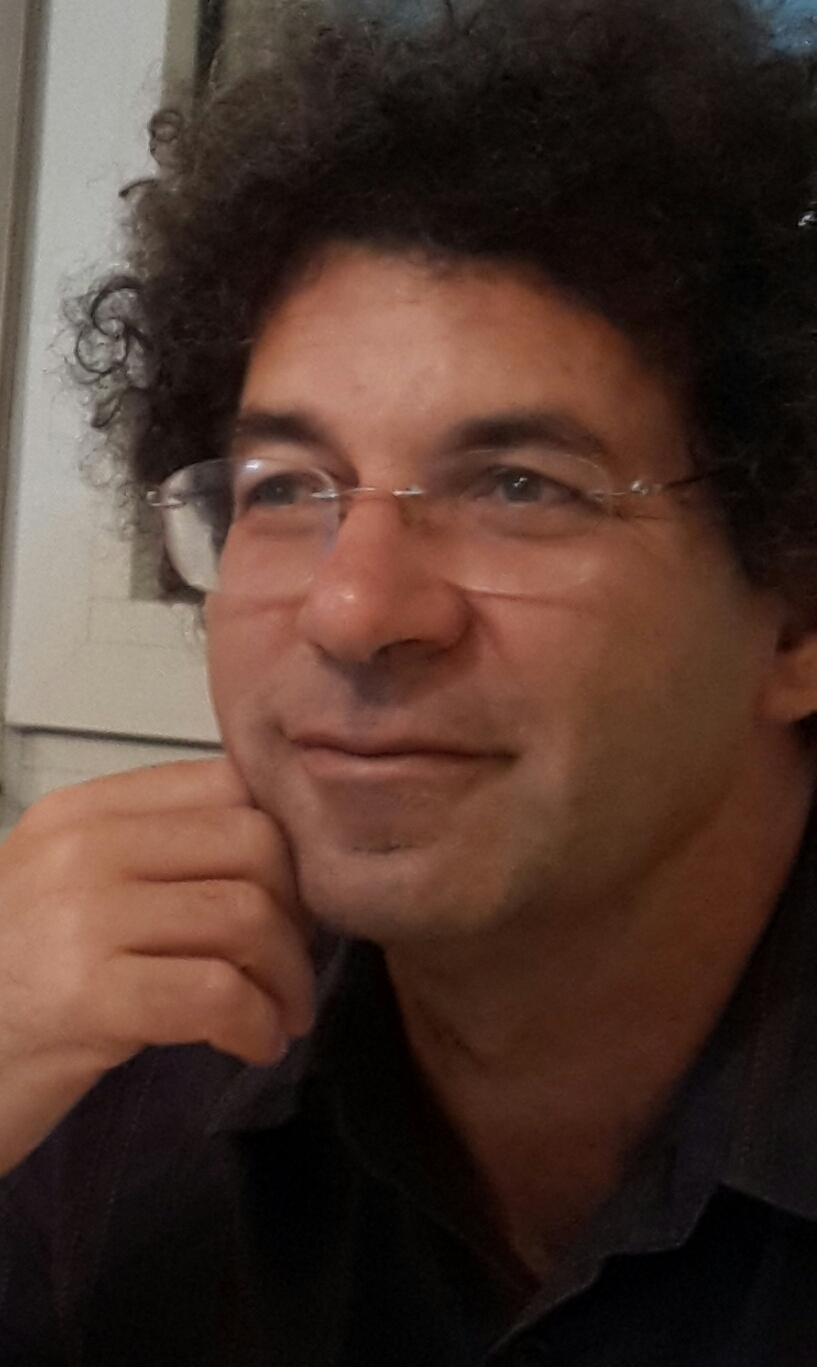
Ran Morin, 2013

Ran Morin (Hebrew: רן מורין; born 1958) is an Israeli artist, known for his statues involving full-sized living trees. Much of his work is found in Israel, notably the Olive Tree and surrounding park on the Ramat Rachel kibbutz. He currently lives in New York.

== Early life and work ==
Morin began his creative work in the mid-70s with the construction of a computer model of the illusion of abstract forms of movement, at the Weizmann Institute. In the early '80s he began to focus on integrating nature (mainly trees) with modern sculpture materials.

== Selected works ==
=== Olive Columns ===
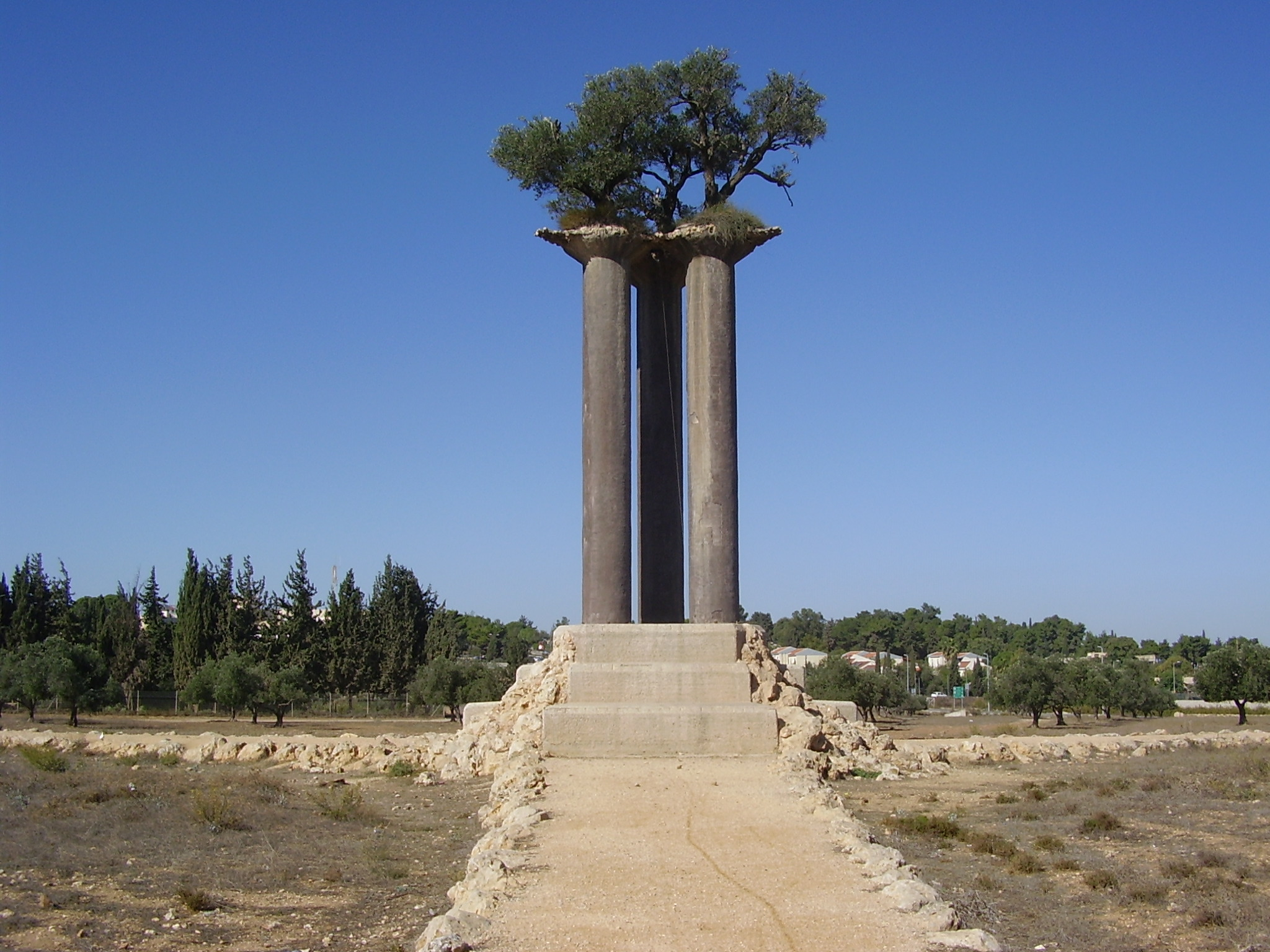
Olive Poles, Ramat Rachel, 1991.

Olive Columns is an environmental sculpture at the edge of Jerusalem, in the middle of the Olive Park. The park is near Kibbutz Ramat Rachel.

This work was finished by Morin in October 1991. It consists of three 15-meter columns, topped by three olive trees, now decades old. There is a series of steps at the base of the pillars leading up to them. A computerized system built into the statue monitors the soil at the top and fertilizes it over time.

The columns are part of an artistic installation with three paths leading away from the triangular base of the trees. Flanking the mouth of one of these paths are two 2-meter tall eggs made of rock, cracked in half at the top, out of which smaller olive trees are growing.

=== Suspended Orange Tree ===
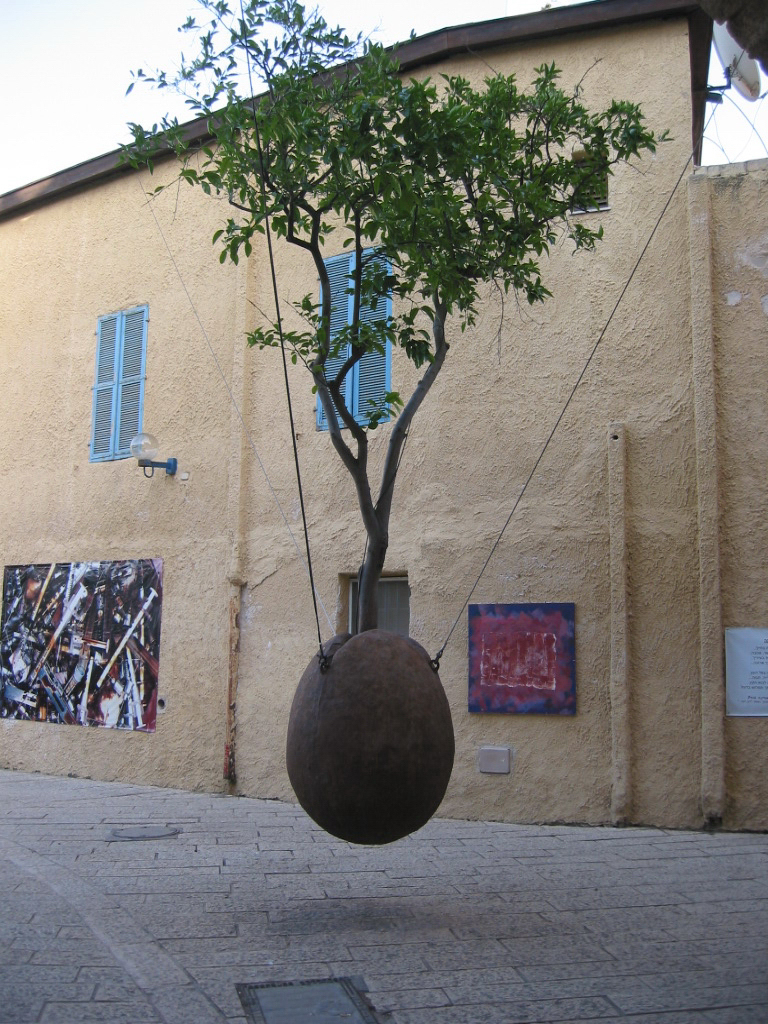
Suspended Orange Tree, Jaffa

Among the city streets of old Jaffa is a hidden work of Morin's known as the Suspended Orange Tree. Finished in 1993, this is a small orange tree that is elevated off of the ground by a large earthenware jug hung by metal chains from the walls of houses nearby. The tree is growing out of the pitcher, trying to break it. Morin sought to emphasize the increasing world of separation between man and nature, as "creatures growing in containers."

This statue is hung only a foot or so off of the ground - enough to see its shadow, but not so high that it seems about to fall down.

Morin has used hanging trees elsewhere: another one adorns the lobby of the Dan Eilat Hotel (finished in 1995), and a hanging maple tree can be seen in London's Regent Park (1994).
