= Rodionov =

Rodionov (Russian: Родионов) is a common Russian last name, and may refer to several people:

- Aleksandr Borisovich Rodionov (1902–1944), Soviet army officer
- Aleksei Rodionov (cinematographer) (born 1947), Russian cinematographer
- Denis Rodionov (born 1985), Kazakh footballer
- Igor Rodionov (1936–2014), Russian general and former Defense Minister of Russia
- Ivan Rodionov (1851–1881), Russian poet
- Jurij Rodionov (born 1999), Austrian tennis player
- Mikhail Rodionov (1907–1950), Soviet statesman and politician
- Mikhail Rodionov (pilot), Soviet pilot during World War II, Hero of the Soviet Union
- Nikolai Rodionov (1915–?), Soviet statesman and diplomat
- Sergey Sergeevich Rodionov (born 1961), Russian banker
- Sergey Rodionov (born 1962), Russian football coach
- Sergey Rodionov (physicist) (1907–1968), Russian physicist
- Vitali Rodionov (born 1983), Belarusian footballer
- Vladimir Rodionov (1878–1954), Russian chemist
- Yevgeny Rodionov (1977–1996), Russian soldier killed in Chechen captivity

== See also ==
- Rodionova
