= Tatyana Rodionova =

Tatyana Rodionova may refer to

- Tatyana Rodionova (born 1941), Russian volleyball player
- Tatyana Rodionova (long jumper) (born 1956), Russian long jumper
- Tatyana Rodionova (runner) (born 1980), Russian middle-distance runner
