= Herodion =

Herodion is a popular mispronunciation of Herodeion, the Greek name of Herodium, a hill, palace-fortress, and town named after King Herod the Great.

Heodion is also an ancient Greek given name that may refer to

- Herodion of Antioch (died AD 136), Christian martyr and Bishop of Antioch
- Herodion of Patras, a Christian saint and relative of Saint Paul
