= History of the Eastern Orthodox Church =

The history of the Eastern Orthodox Church is the formation, events, and transformation of the Eastern Orthodox Church through time. According to the Eastern Orthodox tradition, the history of the Eastern Orthodox Church is traced back to Jesus Christ and the Apostles.

The Apostles appointed successors, known as bishops, and they in turn appointed other bishops in a process known as Apostolic succession. Over time, five Patriarchates were established to organize the Christian world, and four of these ancient patriarchates remain Orthodox today. Orthodox Christianity reached its present form in late antiquity (in the period from the 3rd to the 8th century), when the ecumenical councils were held, doctrinal disputes were resolved, the Fathers of the Church lived and wrote, and Orthodox worship practices settled into their permanent form (including the liturgies and the major holidays of the Church).

In the early medieval period, Orthodox missionaries spread Christianity towards the north, to the Bulgarians, Serbs, Russians and others. Meanwhile, a gradual process of estrangement took place between the four Eastern Patriarchates and the Latin Church of Rome, culminating with the Great Schism in the 11th century, in which Orthodoxy and the Latin Church (later called the Roman Catholic Church) separated from each other. In the Late Middle Ages, the Fall of Constantinople brought a large part of the world's Orthodox Christians under Ottoman Turkish rule. Nevertheless, Orthodoxy continued to flourish in Russia, as well as within the Ottoman Empire among the latter's Christian subject peoples. As the Ottoman Empire declined in the 19th century and several majority-Orthodox nations regained their independence, they organized a number of new autocephalous Orthodox churches in Southern and Eastern Europe.

The Eastern Orthodox jurisdictions with the largest number of adherents in modern times are the Russian and the Romanian Orthodox churches. The most ancient of the Eastern Orthodox communities existing today are the churches of Jerusalem, Antioch, Alexandria, Constantinople, and Georgia.

== Early Christianity ==
=== Apostolic era ===
Christianity first spread in the predominantly Greek-speaking eastern half of the Roman Empire. The Apostles traveled extensively throughout the empire, establishing communities in major cities and regions, with the first community appearing in Jerusalem, followed by communities in Antioch, Ethiopia and others. Early growth also occurred in the two political centers of Rome and Greece, as well as in Byzantium (initially a minor centre under the Metropolitan of Heraclea, but which later became Constantinople). Orthodoxy believes in the apostolic succession that they believe was established by the Apostles in the New Testament; this played a key role in the communities' view of itself as the preserver of the original Christian tradition. Historically the word "church" did not mean a building or housing structure (for which Greek-speakers might have used the word "basilica") but meant a community or gathering of like peoples (see ekklesia). The earliest Ecclesiology would posit that the Eucharistic assembly, under the authority and permission of a Bishop, is what constitutes a Church. As St. Ignatius of Antioch said, "Let no man do anything connected with the Church without the bishop. Let that be deemed a proper Eucharist, which is [administered] either by the bishop, or by one to whom he has entrusted it. Wherever the bishop shall appear, there let the multitude [of the people] also be; even as, wherever Jesus Christ is, there is the Catholic Church. It is not lawful without the bishop either to baptize or to celebrate a love-feast."

The original church or community of the East before the Great Schism comprised:

- the Greek churches founded by Saint Paul
- the Antiochian and Asia Minor churches founded by Saint Peter
- the Coptic (or Egyptian) churches founded by Saint Mark (including, at the time, the Ethiopians of Abyssinia)
- the Syriac churches in Upper Mesopotamia
- the Georgian church, traditionally founded by Saint Andrew and Saint Nino
- the Armenian church, traditionally founded by Saint Jude and Saint Bartholomew
- the church of Jerusalem, founded by Saint James, as well as the churches of Samaria and Judea, together comprising "the Holy Land".

The church of Rome in the West by tradition was founded by both Saint Peter and Saint Paul.

Systematic persecution of the early Christian church caused it to become an underground movement. The first above-ground legal churches were built in Armenia (see Echmiadzin). Armenia became the first country to adopt Christianity as a state religion (traditionally in 301 AD) under King Tiridates III. However, illegal churches before "Christian legalization" are mentioned throughout church history; for example, in the City of Nisibis during the persecutions of Diocletian. Of the underground churches that existed before legalization, some are recorded to have existed in the catacombs of Europe i.e. Catacombs of Rome and also in Greece (see Cave of the Apocalypse, The Church of St George and the church at Pergamon) and also in the underground cities of Anatolia such as Derinkuyu Underground City (also see Cave monastery and Bab Kisan). Also noteworthy are the Church of St Peter in Antioch and the Cenacle in Jerusalem.

=== Patristic Age ===
Much of the official organizing of the ecclesiastical structure, clarifying true from false teachings was done by the bishops of the church. Their works are referred to as Patristics. This tradition of clarification can be seen as established in the saints of the Orthodox Church referred to as the Apostolic Fathers, bishops themselves established by apostolic succession. This also continued into the age when the practice of the religion of Christianity became legal (see the Ecumenical Councils).

The Biblical canon began with the officially accepted books of the Koine Greek Old Testament (which predates Christianity). This canon, called the Septuagint or seventy, continues to be the Old Testament of the Orthodox faith, along with the New Testament's Good news (gospels), Revelations and Letters of the Apostles (including Acts of the Apostles and the Epistle to the Hebrews). The earliest text of the New Testament was written in common or Koine Greek. The texts of the Old Testament had previously been translated into a single language, Koine Greek, in the time of Ptolemy II Philadelphus in 200 BC.

The early Christians had no way to have a copy of the works that later became the canon and other church works accepted but not canonized. Much of the original church liturgical services functioned as a means of learning these works. Orthodox Church services today continue to serve this educational function. The issue of collecting the various works of the eastern churches and compiling them into a canon, each being confirmed as authentic text was a long protracted process. Much of this process was motivated by a need to address various heresies. In many instances, heretical groups had themselves begun compiling and disseminating text that they used to validate their positions, positions that were not consistent with the text, history and traditions of the Orthodox faith.

=== Divine Liturgy ===
Liturgical services, especially the Eucharist service, are based on repeating the actions of Jesus ("do this in remembrance of me"), using the bread and wine, and saying his words (known as the words of the institution). The church has the rest of the liturgical ritual being rooted in Jewish Passover, Siddur, Seder, and synagogue services, including the singing of hymns (especially the Psalms) and reading from the Scriptures (Old and New Testament). The final uniformity of liturgical services became solidified after the church established a Biblical canon, being based on the Apostolic Constitutions and Clementine literature.

=== Bible ===
In the Orthodox view, the Bible represents those texts approved by the church for the purpose of conveying the most important parts of what it already believed. The oldest list of books for the canon is the Muratorian fragment dating to c. 170 (see also Chester Beatty Papyri). The oldest complete canon of the Christian Bible was found at Saint Catherine's Monastery (see Codex Sinaiticus) and later sold to the British by the Soviets in 1933. Parts of the codex are still considered stolen by the Monastery even today. These texts (as a whole) were not universally considered canonical until the church reviewed, edited, accepted and ratified them in 368 AD (also see the Council of Laodicea). Salvation or Soteriology from the Orthodox perspective is achieved not by knowledge of scripture but by being a member of the church or community and cultivating phronema and theosis through participation in the church or community.

== Pentarchy ==
By the 5th century, Christian ecclesiology had organized a hierarchical "pentarchy", or system of five sees (patriarchates), with a settled order of precedence. The first four of the patriarchs were located in the largest cities of the Roman Empire, while the fifth was in Jerusalem, a city deriving its importance from being the place where the Christian Church was founded, despite its relatively small size. All five locations also had Christian communities who traced their lineage back to one or several Apostles.

Thus, in order of precedence, the five patriarchates (and the Apostles claimed as founders by each patriarchate) were as follows:

- Rome (founded by Sts. Peter and Paul), currently in Italy. This was the only Pentarch in the Western Roman Empire, and is now better known as the Pope of the Roman Catholic Church.
- Constantinople (St. Andrew), currently Istanbul in Turkey
- Alexandria (St. Mark), currently in Egypt
- Antioch (St. Peter), currently in Syria
- Jerusalem (St. James), currently in Israel

Two patriarchates are noted to have been founded by St Peter, the patriarchate of Rome and the patriarchate of Antioch. The Eastern churches accept Antioch as the church founded by St Peter (see the Greek Orthodox Church of Antioch and the Syriac Orthodox Church).

== Byzantine period ==
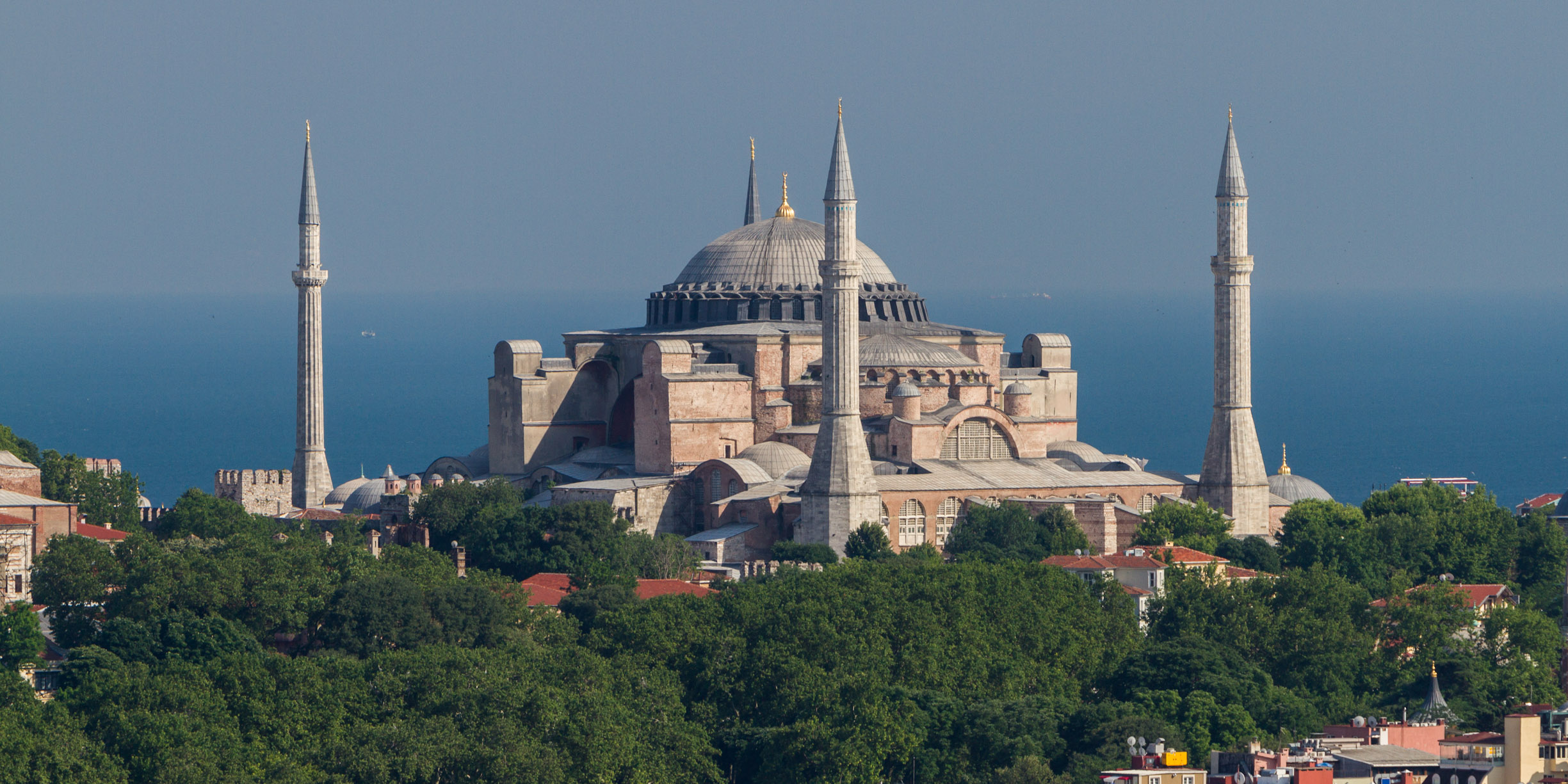
The Hagia Sophia in Constantinople (now Istanbul) was built by the Eastern Roman emperor Justinian the Great in 532–537.

It was in the establishment of the Eastern Roman Empire by Emperor Constantine the Great that Christianity was legalized (Edict of Milan, 313). It was not until then that systematic Roman persecution of Christians stopped, although it did resurface later, though temporarily, under Roman paganism (Emperor Julian the Apostate). Christianity was not established as the state religion in the eastern part of the Roman Empire until Theodosius I convened the First Council of Constantinople (or the second ecumenical council) in 381. This council put an end to the Arian controversy by establishing the Trinitarian doctrine.

Legalization included the calling of the ecumenical councils to resolve disputes and establish church dogma on which the entire church would agree, thus defining what it means to be a Christian in a universal or broad sense of the word (the Greek word for universal being katholikós or catholic). According to the Orthodox Church, these councils were the continuation of church council tradition that predated legalization (see Synod). According to Joseph Raya, "Byzantine culture and Orthodoxy are one and the same.".

In the 530s the second Church of the Holy Wisdom (Hagia Sophia) was built in Constantinople under emperor Justinian I, to become the center of the ecclesiastical community for the rulers of the Eastern Roman Empire or Byzantium. The first church had been destroyed during the Nika riots.

=== Ecumenical councils ===
These pre-Ecumenical councils include the Council of Jerusalem c. 50, Council of Rome (155), Second Council of Rome 193 AD, Council of Ephesus 193 AD, Council of Carthage (251), Council of Iconium 258 AD, Council of Antioch (264), Councils of Arabia 246–247 AD, Council of Elvira 306 AD, Council of Carthage (311), Synod of Neo-Caesarea c.314 AD Council of Ancyra 314 AD, Council of Arles (314). The first ecumenical council in part was a continuation of Trinitarian doctrinal issues addressed in pre-legalization of Christianity councils or synods (for examples see Synods of Antioch between 264–269AD and Synod of Elvira). As such, they constitute a permanent standard for an Orthodox understanding of the Trinity, the person or hypostasis of Christ, the incarnation.

The tradition of councils within the church started with the apostolic council of Jerusalem, but this council is not numbered as an ecumenical council. It was convened to address the Abrahamic tradition of circumcision and its relation to converted Gentiles (Acts 15). Its decisions are accepted by all Christians, and later definitions of an ecumenical council to conform to this sole Biblical council.

The first seven Ecumenical Councils were held between 325 (the First Council of Nicaea) and 787 (the Second Council of Nicaea), which the Orthodox recognize as the definitive interpretation of Christian dogma.

First Council of Nicaea (Nicaea, 325)
convoked by the Roman Emperor Constantine, condemning the view of Arius that the Son is a created being inferior to the Father.
Second Ecumenical Council (Constantinople, 381)
defining the nature of the Holy Spirit against those asserting His inequality with the other persons of the Trinity. Under Theodosius I this council marks the end of the Arian conflict in the Eastern Roman Empire.
Third Ecumenical Council (Ephesus 431)
affirmed that Mary is truly "Birth giver" or "Mother" of God (Theotokos), contrary to the teachings of Nestorius.
Fourth Ecumenical Council (Chalcedon, 451)
affirmed that Jesus is truly God and truly man, without mixture of the two natures, contrary to Monophysite teaching.
Fifth Ecumenical Council (Constantinople, 553)
interpreting the decrees of Chalcedon and further explaining the relationship of the two natures of Jesus; it also condemned the teachings of Origen on the pre-existence of the soul, and Apocatastasis.
Sixth Ecumenical Council (Constantinople, 681)
declaring that Christ has two wills of his two natures, human and divine, contrary to the teachings of the Monothelites.
Seventh Ecumenical Council (Nicea, 787)
called under the Empress Regnant Irene, it affirmed the making and veneration of icons, while also forbidding the worship of icons and the making of three-dimensional statuary. It reversed the declaration of an earlier council that had called itself the Seventh Ecumenical Council and also nullified its status (see separate article on Iconoclasm). That earlier council had been held under the iconoclast Emperor Constantine V. It met with more than 340 bishops at Constantinople and Hieria in 754, declaring the making of icons of Jesus or the saints an error, mainly for Christological reasons.

The Orthodox Church also recognizes the Fourth Council of Constantinople in 879 as Ecumenical, and continues to participate in dogmatically binding councils.

==== Confronting Arianism ====
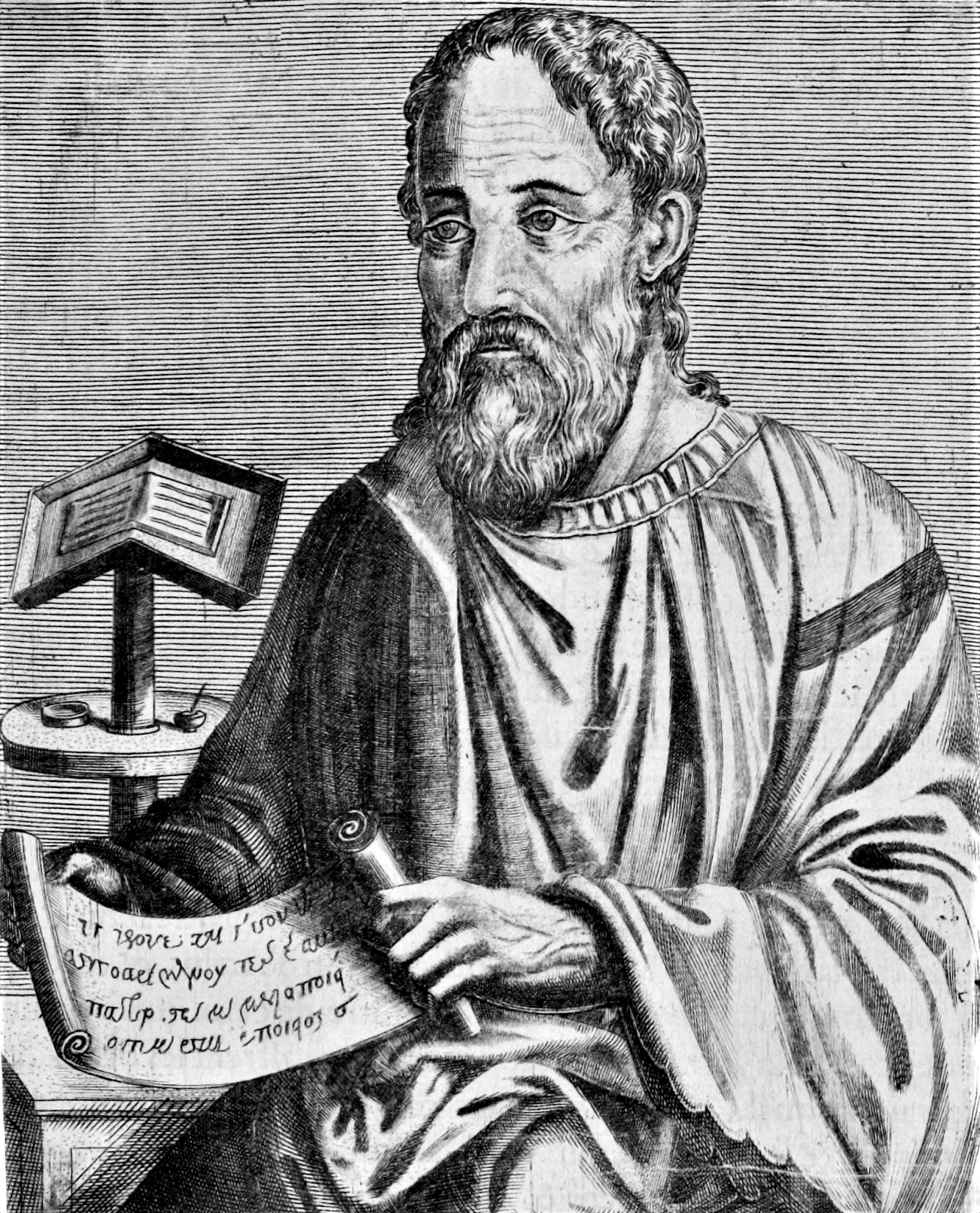
Eusebius of Caesarea

The First Ecumenical Council was convened to address the divinity of Christ once more (see Paul of Samosata and the Synods of Antioch) but this time through the teachings of Arius, an Egyptian presbyter from Alexandria, who taught that Jesus Christ was created, albeit divine, and not God in essence: both the Father and the Son where of "like" essence or being (see homoiousia) but not of the same essence or being (see homoousia). Much of the controversion was over the kenotic phrasing that Christ expressed in the New Testament to express submission to God the Father. This Ecumenical council declared that Jesus Christ was distinct from God in existence (hypostasis or persona). Jesus was God in essence, being and nature (ousia or substantia).

The first council did not end the conflict. When Emperor Constantine I was baptized, the baptism was performed by an Arian bishop and relative, Eusebius of Nicomedia. Also the charges of Christian corruption by Constantine (see the Constantinian shift) ignore the fact that Constantine deposed Athanasius of Alexandria and later restored Arius, who had been branded a heresiarch by the Nicene Council. After his death, Constantine I was succeeded by two Arian Emperors Constantius II (son of Constantine I) and Valens. It was not until the co-reigns of Gratian and Theodosius that Arianism was effectively wiped out among the ruling class and elite of the Eastern Empire. Theodosius' wife St Flacilla was instrumental in his campaign to end Arianism. This later culminated into the killing of some 300,000 Orthodox Christians at the hands of Arians in Milan in 538AD.

==== Iconoclasm ====
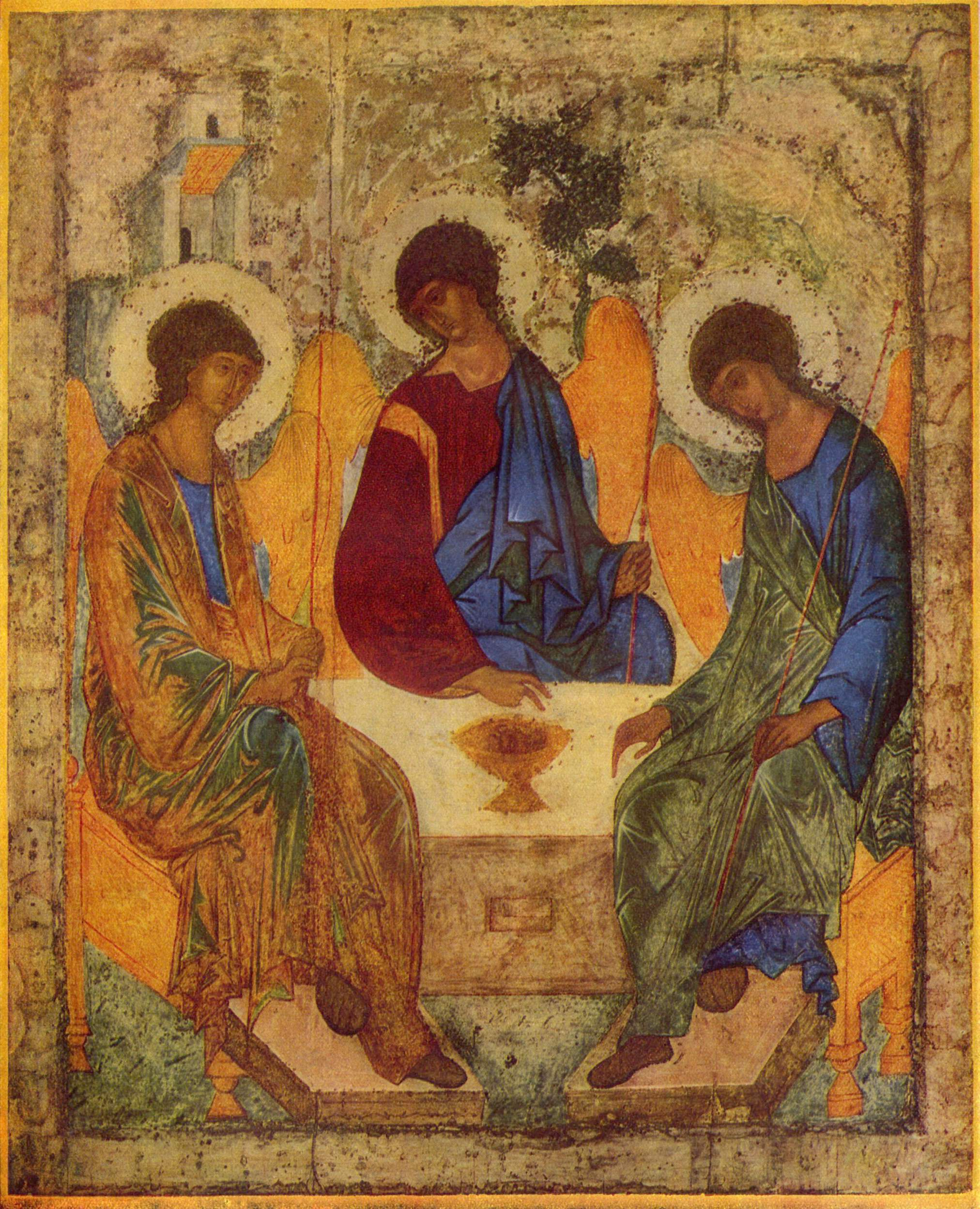
Andrei Rublev's Trinity (1425)

The Iconoclasm (730–787 and 813–843) was a movement within the Byzantine church to assert that the Christian culture of portraits (see icon) of the family of Christ and subsequent Christians and biblical scenes were not of a Christian origin and therefore heretical. The group destroyed much of the Christian churches' art history, until it was later defined as heretical itself under the Seventh Ecumenical council. The iconoclasts considered the tradition of icons as contrary to the ban on 'graven images', interpreted in a narrow sense as 'engraved or carved'. This forbade many of the ornaments that Moses was commanded to create in the passages right after the commandment was given, i.e., cherubim., as well as the Cross and other holy artifacts. The Orthodox Church understands this in a wider sense as a ban on no carved images: the people of God are not to create idols and then worship them.

=== Tensions with the Papacy ===
Furthermore, the loss of the Patriarchate of Alexandria following the schism regarding the Council of Chalcedon (451), which led to the separation between the Byzantine Church and the Alexandrian Coptic Church, as well as the fall of the Patriarchates of Antioch and Jerusalem following the conquest of Palestine and Syria during the rise of Islam, made the theory of the Pentarchy more of a simple theory, than a practical reality. These events also led to the Patriarch of Constantinople centralizing more power in his office, acting alone as the sole Patriarch remaining in the East until the fall of the Byzantine Empire in 1453.

Two basic problems—the primacy of the bishop of Rome and the procession of the Holy Spirit—were involved. These doctrinal differences were first openly discussed during the patriarchate of Photius I.

Rome interpreted her primacy among the Pentarchy of five sees in terms of sovereignty, as a God-given right involving universal jurisdiction in the Church. Some churches of the East believed that the Roman See had a primacy of honour but not supremacy, i.e. the Pope being the first among equals, not an absolute authority with the ability to make infallible statements.

==== Photian schism ====
Photius refused to accept the supremacy of the pope in Orthodox matters, or accept the Filioque clause that had been added to the Nicene Creed by the Latin church, and was later the theological breaking point in the ultimate Great Schism in the 11th century. The controversy also involved ecclesiastical jurisdictional rights in the Bulgarian church.

Photios did provide concession on the issue of jurisdictional rights concerning Bulgaria, and the papal legates made do with his return of Bulgaria to Rome. This concession, however, was purely nominal, as Bulgaria's return to the Byzantine rite in 870 had already secured for it an autocephalous church. Without the consent of Boris I of Bulgaria, the papacy was unable to enforce any of its claims.

==== Mission to Great Moravia ====
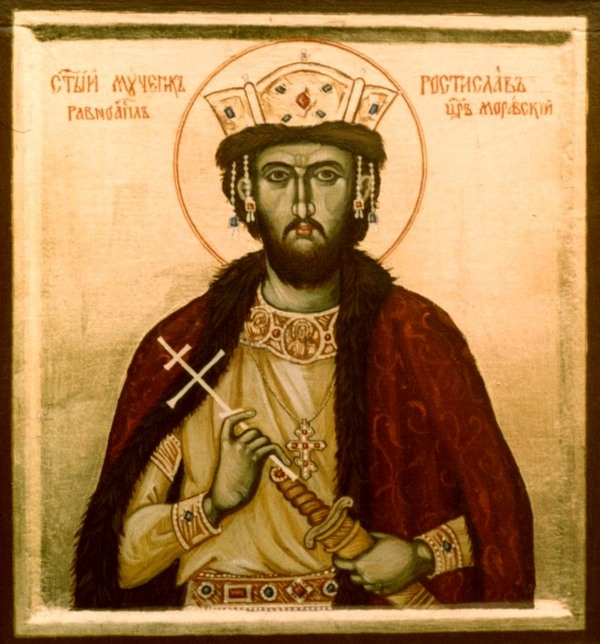
Prince Rastislav

In Great Moravia, the two brothers Saints Cyril and Methodius encountered Frankish missionaries from Germany, who represented the Latin branch of the Church, more particularly representing the Holy Roman Empire as founded by Charlemagne, and committing to linguistic and cultural uniformity. They insisted on the use of the Latin liturgy, and regarded Moravia as their rightful mission field.

==== Conversion of Eastern and Southern Slavs ====
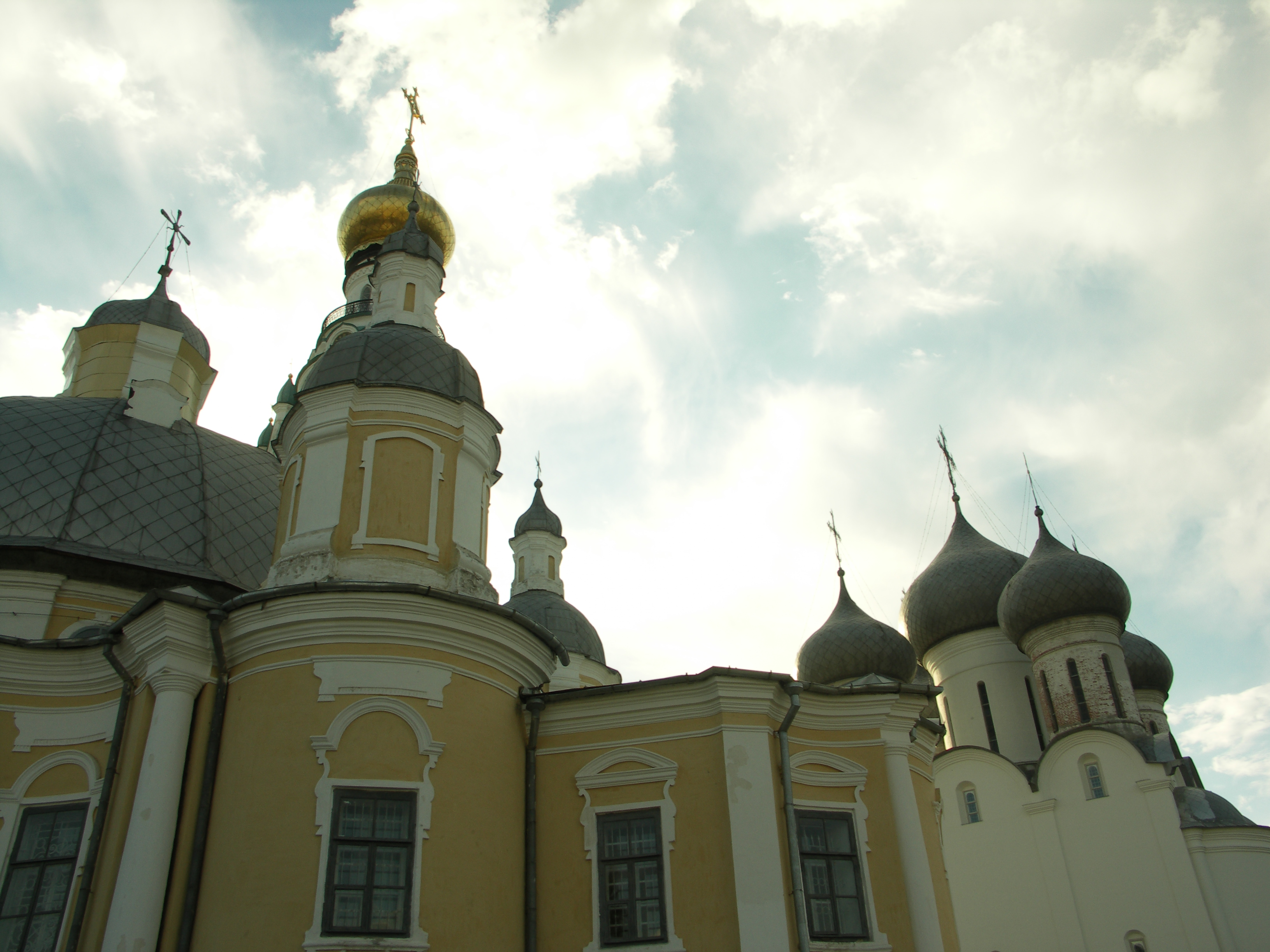
Orthodox churches in Vologda, Russia

In the 9th and 10th centuries, Christianity made great inroads into Eastern Europe: first in Bulgaria and Serbia, then followed by Kievan Rus'. For a period of time, there was a real possibility that all of the newly baptized South Slav nations, Bulgarians, Serbs, and Croats would join the Western church, but in the end, only the Croats joined.

The Serbs were baptised during the reign of Heraclius (610–641) by "elders of Rome" according to Constantine Porphyrogenitus in his annals (r. 913–959). The forming of Christianity as state religion dates to the time of the Eastern Orthodox missionaries (Saints) Cyril and Methodius during Basil I (r. 867–886), who baptised the Serbs sometime before helping Knez Mutimir in the war against the Saracens in 869, after acknowledging the suzerainty of the Byzantine Empire.

A Serbian bishopric (Diocese of Ras) may have been founded in Stari Ras in 871 by Serbian Knez Mutimir, confirmed by the Council of Constantinople in 879–80. The Serbs and Bulgarians adopt the Old Slavonic liturgy instead of the Greek.

In 863, a mission from the Patriarch of Constantinople converted King Boris I of Bulgaria to Christianity. Boris realized that the Christianization of his subjects by the Byzantine mission would facilitate the undesired spread of Byzantine influence in Bulgaria, as the liturgy was carried out in the Greek language, and the newly established Bulgarian Church was subordinate to the Church of Constantinople. A popular revolt against the new religion prompted the King to request that the Bulgarian Church be granted independence, which was refused by Constantinople. Boris turned to the Pope, and the arrival of the Roman clerical mission concluded the activity of the Byzantine mission, which was ordered by the King to leave Bulgaria.

Constantinople nervously watched the events taking place in their northern neighbour, because a pro-Rome Bulgaria threatened its immediate interests. A religious council was held in the summer of 867 in the Byzantine capital, during which the Roman Church's behaviour was harshly condemned. As a personal culprit, Pope Nicholas I was anathematized. In a letter to Boris, the Byzantine emperor Michael III expressed his disapproval of Bulgaria's religious reorientation and used offensive language against the Roman Church. The old rivalry between the two Churches burned with new power.

The Roman mission's efforts were met with success and King Boris asked Pope Nicholas I to appoint Formosa of Portua as Bulgarian Archbishop. The Pope refused, and his successor Pope Adrian II turned out to be even more disinclined to comply, so Boris turned again to Constantinople. This resulted in the creation of an autonomous national (Bulgarian) Archbishopric. In the next 10 years, Pope Adrian II and his successors made desperate attempts to reclaim their influence in Bulgaria, but their efforts ultimately failed.

The foundations of the Bulgarian national Church had been set. The next stage was the implementation of the Glagolitic alphabet and the Slavonic language as official language of the Bulgarian Church and State in 893 AD. St. Clement, St. Naum and St. Angelaruis returned to Bulgaria, where they managed to instruct several thousand future Slavonic clergymen in the rites using the Slavic language and the Glagolitic alphabet. In 893 AD, Bulgaria expelled its Byzantine clergy and proclaimed the Slavonic language as the official language of the Bulgarian Church and State.

==== Great Schism ====
In the 11th century the East–West Schism took place between Rome and Constantinople, resulting in a separation between the Catholic Church and the Orthodox Church (with both claiming to represent the sole legitimate continuation of the original Church). There were doctrinal issues like the filioque clause and the authority of the Pope involved in the split, but these were exacerbated by cultural and linguistic differences between Latins and Greeks. Prior to that, the Eastern and Western halves of the Church had frequently been in conflict, particularly during the periods of iconoclasm and the Photian schism. The Orthodox Byzantine Greeks perceived the Papacy as taking on monarch type characteristics that were not inline with the Church's historical tradition as can be seen in the words of Archbishop Niketas of Nicomedia of the 12th century:

My dearest brother, we do not deny to the Roman Church the primacy among the five sister patriachates and we recognize her right to the most honorable seat at the Ecumenical Council. But she has separated herself from us by her own deeds when through pride she assumed a monarchy which does not belong to her office ... How shall we accept decrees from her that have been issued without consulting us and even without our knowledge? If the Roman pontiff seated on the lofty throne of his glory wished to thunder at us and, so to speak, hurl his mandates at us from on high and if he wishes to judge us and even to rule us and our churches, not by taking counsel with us but at his own arbitrary pleasure what kind of brotherhood, or even what kind of parenthood can this be? We should be the slaves not the sons, of such a church and the Roman see would not be the pious mother of sons but a hard and imperious mistress of slaves

— Archbishop Nicetas of Nicomedia of the Twelfth Century

=== Hesychast controversy ===
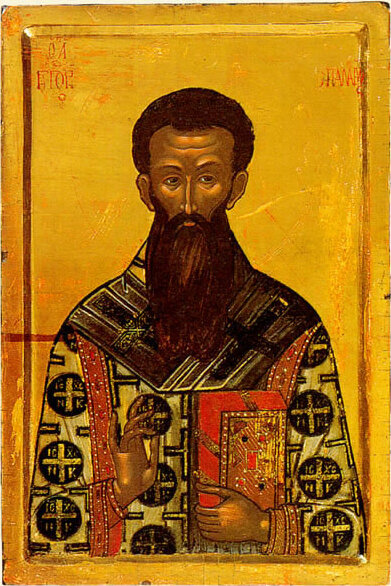
Gregory Palamas

Under church tradition the practice of Hesychasm has it beginnings in the bible, Matthew 6:6 and the Philokalia. It is a form of constant purposeful prayer or experiential prayer, explicitly referred to as contemplation. The tradition of contemplation with inner silence or tranquility is shared by all Eastern ascetic movements, having its roots in the Egyptian traditions of monasticism exemplified by such Orthodox monastics as St Anthony of Egypt. The Hesychasts stated that at higher stages of their practice they reached the actual contemplation-union with the Tabor Light, i.e., Uncreated Divine Light or photomos seen by the apostles in the event of the Transfiguration of Christ and Saint Paul while on the road to Damascus. It is depicted in icons and in theological discourse as tongues of fire.

Around the year 1337, Hesychasm attracted the attention of a learned member of the Orthodox Church, Barlaam, a Calabrian monk who at that time held the office of abbot in the Monastery of St Saviour's in Constantinople and who visited Mount Athos. There, he encountered Hesychasts and heard descriptions of their practices, also reading the writings of the teacher in Hesychasm of St Gregory Palamas, himself an Athonite monk. Trained in Scholastic theology, Barlaam was scandalized by Hesychasm and began to campaign against it. As a teacher of theology in the Scholastic mode, Barlaam propounded a more intellectual and propositional approach to the knowledge of God than the Hesychasts taught. In particular, he took exception to the Hesychasts doctrine to the nature of the uncreated light, the experience of which was said to be the goal of Hesychast practice. Barlaam held this concept to be polytheistic, inasmuch as it postulated two eternal substances, a visible (immanent) and an invisible God (transcendent).

On the Hesychast side, the controversy was taken up by Antonite St Gregory Palamas, afterwards Archbishop of Thessalonica, who was asked by his fellow monks on Mt Athos to defend Hesychasm from Barlaam's attacks. St Gregory was well-educated in Greek philosophy (dialectical method) and thus able to defend Hesychasm. In 1341 the dispute came before a synod held at Constantinople and was presided over by the Emperor Andronicus; the synod, taking into account the regard in which the writings of the pseudo-Dionysius were held, condemned Barlaam, who recanted and returned to Calabria, becoming a bishop in the Roman Catholic Church. Three other synods on the subject were held, at the second of which the followers of Barlaam gained a brief victory. In 1351, at a synod under the presidency of Emperor John VI Cantacuzenus, Hesychast doctrine and Palamas' Essence-Energies distinction was established as the doctrine of the Orthodox Church.

One of Barlaam's friends, Gregory Akindynos, who originally was also a friend of Gregory's, later took up the controversy. Another opponent of Palamism was Manuel Kalekas who sought to reconcile the Eastern and Western Churches. Following the decision of 1351, there was strong repression against anti-Palamist thinkers, who ultimately had no choice but to emigrate and convert to Catholicism. This exodus of highly educated Greek scholars, later reinforced by refugees following the Fall of Constantinople of 1453, had a significant influence on the first generation (that of Petrarca and Boccaccio) of the incipient Italian Renaissance.

=== Eastern monastic or ascetic tradition ===
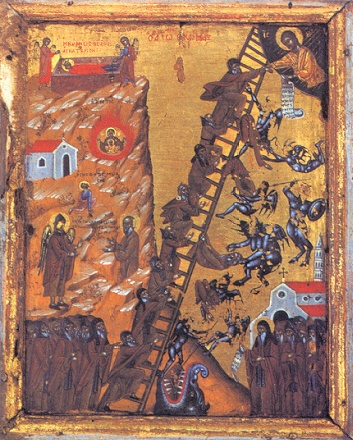
Icon Depicting Souls Ascent to Heaven

With the elevation of Christianity to the status of a legal religion within the Roman Empire by Constantine the Great, with the edict of Milan (313), many Orthodox felt a new decline in the ethical life of Christians. In reaction to this decline, many refused to accept any compromises and fled the world or societies of mankind, to become monastics. Monasticism thrived, especially in Egypt, with two important monastic centers, one in the desert of Wadi Natroun, by the Western Bank of the Nile, with Abba Ammoun (d. 356) as its founder, and one called Scetis in the desert of Skete, south of Nitria, with Saint Makarios of Egypt (died c. Egypt 330) as its founder. These monks were anchorites, following the monastic ideal of St. Anthony the Great, Paul of Thebes and Saint Pachomius. They lived by themselves, gathering together for common worship on Saturdays and Sundays only. This is not to say that Monasticism or Orthodox Asceticism was created whole cloth at the time of legalization but rather at the time it blossomed into a mass movement. Charismatics as the ascetic movement was considered had no clerical status as such. Later history developed around the Greek (Mount Athos) and Syrian (Cappadocia) forms of monastic life, along with the formation of Monastic Orders or monastic organization. The three main forms of Ascetics' traditions being Skete, Cenobite and Hermit respectively.

=== Crusades ===
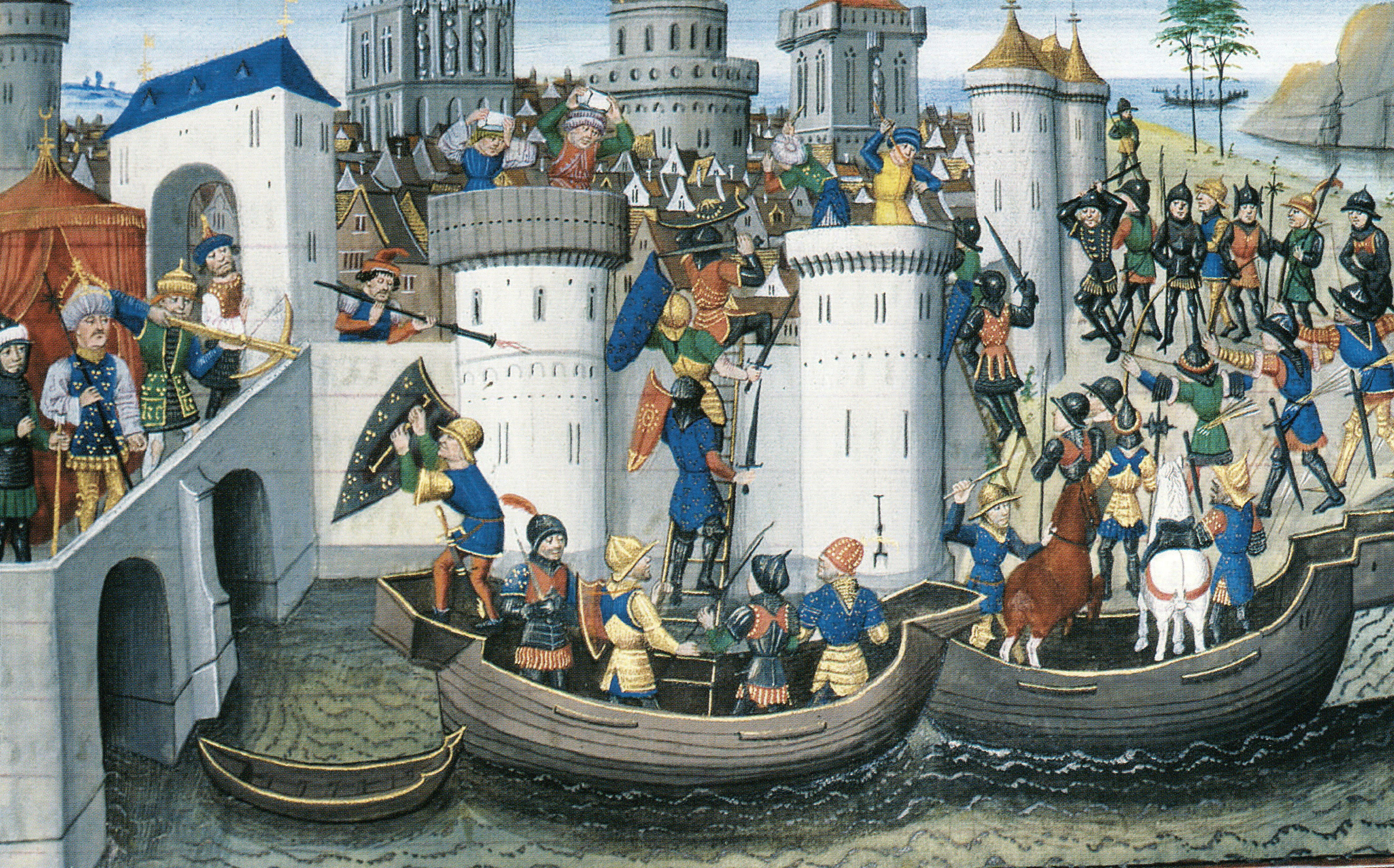
Conquest of the Orthodox city of Constantinople by the crusaders in 1204

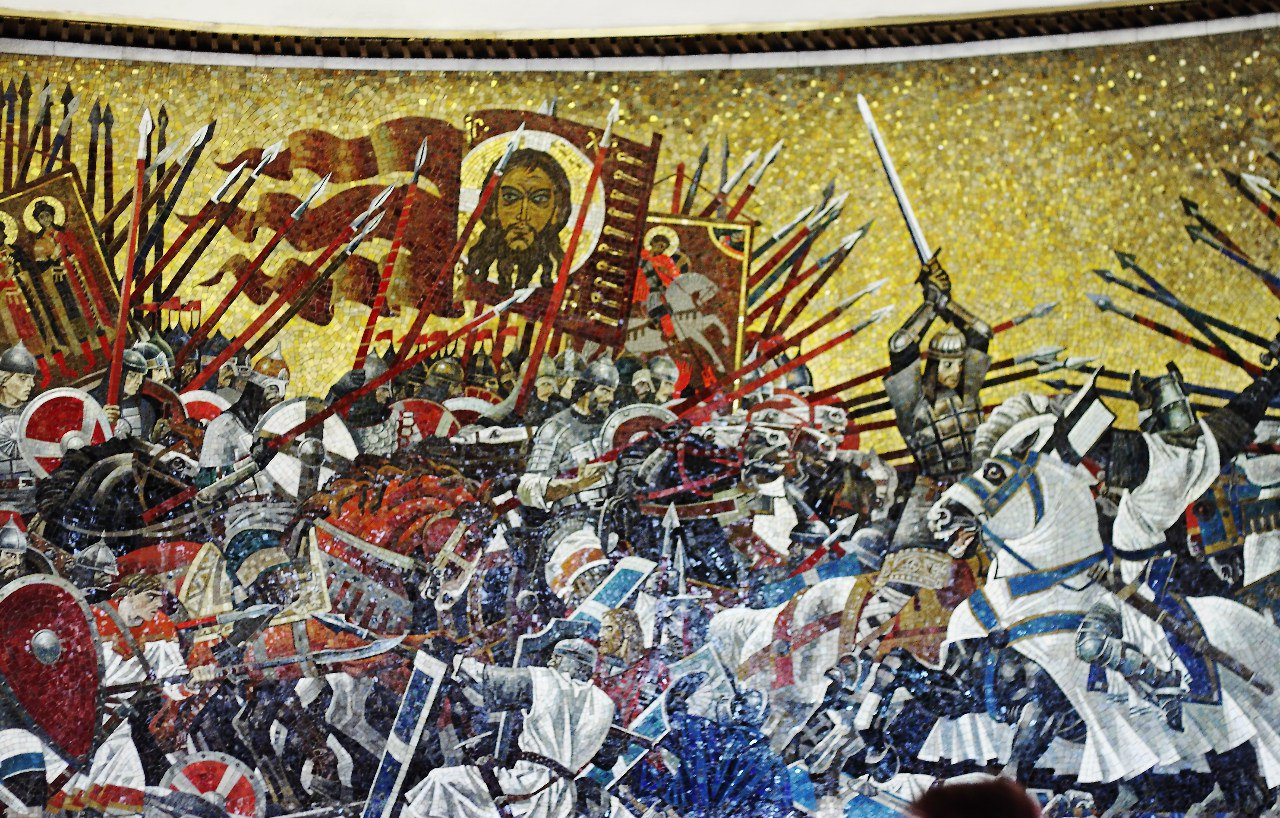
Prince Alexander Nevsky defeats the Teutonic Knights at the Battle of the Ice in 1242 (20th century work)

The capture and sacking of Constantinople by the Fourth Crusade in 1204 was, perhaps, the point of no return for the East-West schism. Motivated in part by lingering resentment over the massacre of the Latins in Constantinople 22 years earlier, ill-fated dynamics in the organization of the crusade (originally intended to recapture Jerusalem), and Alexios Angelos' request that his father's rule be reestablished in Constantinople, the main crusader army arrived in Constantinople in April of 1203. The sacking of Constantinople and the Church of Holy Wisdom, the destruction of the Monastery of Stoudios, Library of Constantinople and the establishment of the Latin Empire in Constantinople and also throughout West Asia Minor and Greece (see the Kingdom of Thessalonica, Kingdom of Cyprus) are considered definitive though. The establishment of the Latin Empire in 1204 was intended to supplant the Orthodox Byzantine Empire. This is symbolized by many Orthodox churches being converted into Roman Catholic properties and churches like Hagia Sophia and Church of the Pantokrator, and it is viewed with some rancor to the present day. Some of the European Christian community actively endorsed the attacking of Orthodox Christians.

The Teutonic Order's failed attempts to conquer Orthodox Russia (particularly the Republics of Pskov and Novgorod), an enterprise endorsed by Pope Gregory IX, can also be considered as a part of the Northern Crusades. One of the major blows for the idea of the conquest of Russia was the Battle of the Ice in 1242. With or without the Pope's blessing, Sweden also undertook several crusades against Orthodox Novgorod. Many Orthodox saw the actions of the Catholics in the Mediterranean as a prime determining factor in the weakening of Byzantium which led to the Empire's eventual conquest and fall to Islam. Some Orthodox see a continuation of Roman Catholic hostility in the establishment of the Uniate or Eastern Catholic Churches (see the sainting of Bissarion in 1950).

In 2004, Pope John Paul II extended a formal apology for the sacking of Constantinople in 1204; the apology was formally accepted by Patriarch Bartholomew of Constantinople. Many things that were stolen during this time: holy relics, riches, and many other items, are still held in various Western European cities, particularly Venice.

=== Establishment of the Roman Catholic Latin Empire ===
After the Sack of Constantinople in 1204 AD by Roman Catholic Crusaders as part of the fourth crusade, much of Asia Minor was brought under Roman Catholic rule and the Latin Empire of the East was established. As the conquest by the European crusaders was not exclusive to the fourth crusade, many various kingdoms of European rule were established. After the fall of Constantinople to the Latin West, the Empire of Nicaea was established, which was later to be the origin of the Greek monarchy that defeated the Latin forces of Europe and re-established Orthodox Monarchy in Constantinople and Asia Minor.

== Ottoman period ==
In 1453 AD, the city of Constantinople, the last stronghold of the Byzantine Empire fell to the Ottoman Empire. By this time, Egypt had been under Muslim control for some seven centuries. Jerusalem had been conquered by the Umayyad Muslims in 638, won back by Rome in 1099 under the First Crusade and then finally reconquered by the Muslims under Saladin in 1187.

Under Ottoman rule, the Greek Orthodox Church acquired power as an autonomous millet. The ecumenical patriarch was the religious and administrative ruler of the entire "Orthodox nation" (Ottoman administrative unit), which encompassed all the Orthodox subjects of the Empire, but was dominated by ethnic Greeks.

Under the Ottoman Empire, violence against non-Muslims was common. One of the worst such episodes occurred under Yavuz Sultan Selim I. These events includes the atrocities against, among others, the Serbs in 1804–1878, the Greeks in 1814–1832, and the Bulgarian in 1876–1877 (see also Phanariote), as well as many individual Christians being made martyrs for stating their faith or speaking negatively against Islam.

=== Religious rights ===
The Orthodox Church was an accepted institution under the Ottomans, in contrast to Catholicism which was associated with enemy Austria, and actually grew in size during Ottoman rule. This included the building of churches and monasteries.

=== Fall of the Ottoman Empire ===
The fall of the Ottoman was precipitated by the Roman Catholic and Orthodox disputed possession of the Church of the Nativity and the Church of the Holy Sepulchre in Jerusalem. During the early 1850s, the two sides made demands which the Sultan could not possibly satisfy simultaneously. In 1853, the Sultan adjudicated in favour of the French, despite the vehement protestations of the local Orthodox monks.

The ruling Ottoman siding with Rome over the Orthodox provoked outright war (see the Eastern Question). As the Ottoman Empire had been for sometime falling into political, social and economic decay (see the Sick Man of Europe) this conflict ignited the Crimean War in 1850 between Russia and the Ottoman Empire.

=== Persecution by the "Young Turks" ===
Systematic massacres took place in 1894–1896 when Sultan Abdul killed 300,000 Armenians throughout the provinces. In 1909 government troops killed, in the towns of Adana alone, over 20,000 Christian Armenians. Also, in the first two decades of the 20th century, there were massacres of Greeks, Slavs, and Armenians in the Ottoman Empire, culminating in the Armenian, Greek and Assyrian genocides. As a result, the 20th century saw a sharp decline of the number of Orthodox Christians, and of Christians in general, in the Anatolian peninsula amidst complaints of Turkish governmental repression of various Eastern and Oriental Orthodox groups.

=== Republic of Turkey ===
During the Lausanne Conference in 1923, the Turkish and Greek sides after some discussions accepted the proposal of a population exchange. Muslims in Greece (save the ones in Eastern Thrace) were expelled to Turkey, and Greek Orthodox people in Turkey (save the ones in Istanbul) were expelled to Greece.

In September 1955, a pogrom was directed primarily at Istanbul's 100,000-strong Greek minority. In 1971, the Halki seminary in Istanbul was closed along with other private higher education institutions in Turkey.

=== Other Muslim-majority states ===
Orthodoxy under the Palestinian National Authority (including Gaza). Orthodoxy in Saudi Arabia, Yemen, Jordan, Syria, Iran, Iraq, Afghanistan, Tajikistan, Kazakhstan, Uzbekistan, Turkmenistan (see Melkite and Kurdish Christians).

=== Jerusalem ===
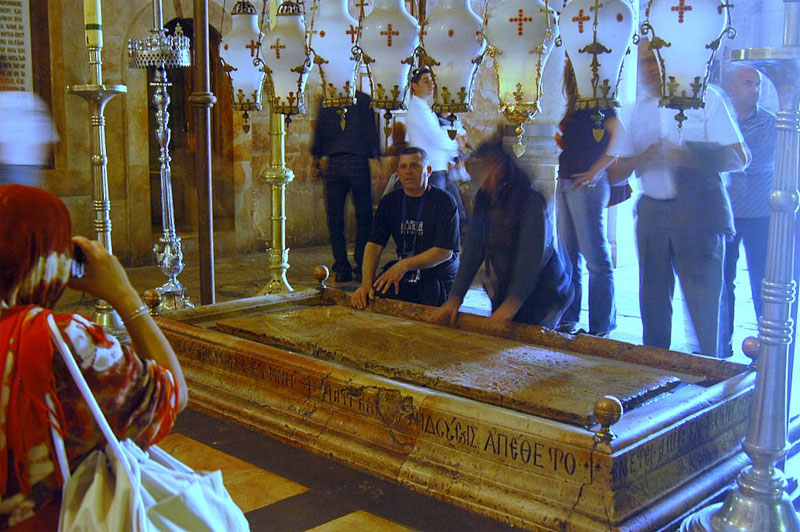
The Stone of the Anointing, believed to be the place where Jesus' body was prepared for burial. It is the 13th Station of the Cross.

The Orthodox Patriarch of Jerusalem and the ecclesiastics of the Orthodox church are based in the ancient Church of the Holy Sepulchre constructed in 335 AD.

== Russia ==
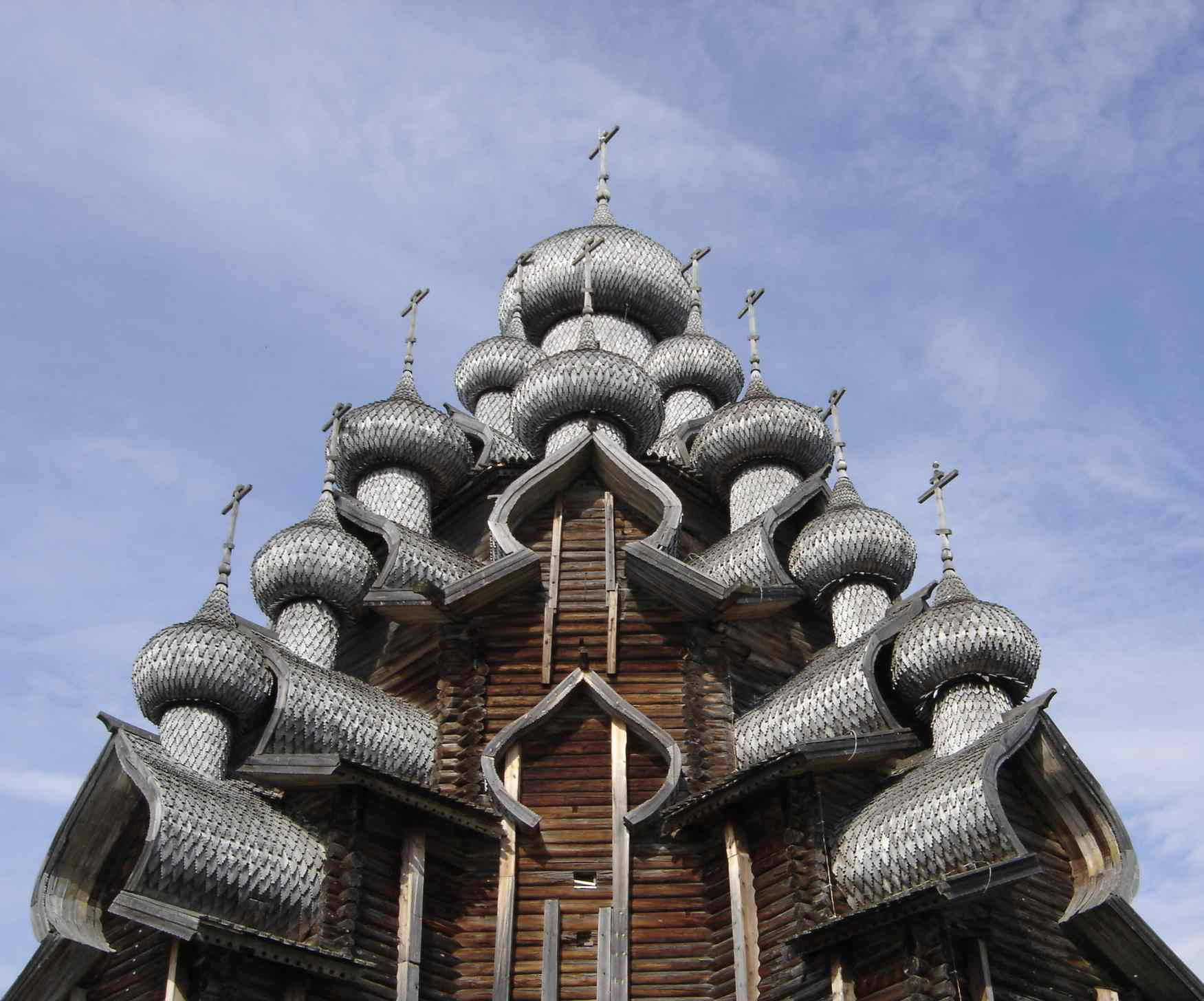
Kizhi Transfiguration church

The success of the conversion of the Bulgarians facilitated the conversion of the East Slavs. By the beginning of the 11th century most of the Slavic world, including, Bulgaria, Serbia, and Russia had converted to Orthodox Christianity. Bulgaria's Church was officially recognized as a Patriarchate by Constantinople in 927, Serbia's in 1346, and Russia's in 1589.

Through a series of Wars with the World of Islam the church did indeed establish itself as the protector of Orthodoxy (see the Eastern Question and the Russo-Turkish wars).

=== Under Mongol rule ===
Russia lay under Mongol rule from the 13th century through the 15th century. The Mongol invasion of Rus' in 1237–1242 led to what is called the Tatar period in Russian history. This period led to great calamity for the internal structure of Russia. Much of Russia was ruled by Mongols, and the Russian princes were subordinated to the Mongols.

The eventual end of the reign of the Golden Horde is said to have begun with the Battle of Kulikovo on 8 September 1380, which involves the famous Orthodox legend of the Russian monk and champion Alexander Peresvet and his death that mark the beginning of the battle. The final face-off that formally ended Mongol rule in Russia was the Great Stand on the Ugra River in 1480.

=== Synodal period ===
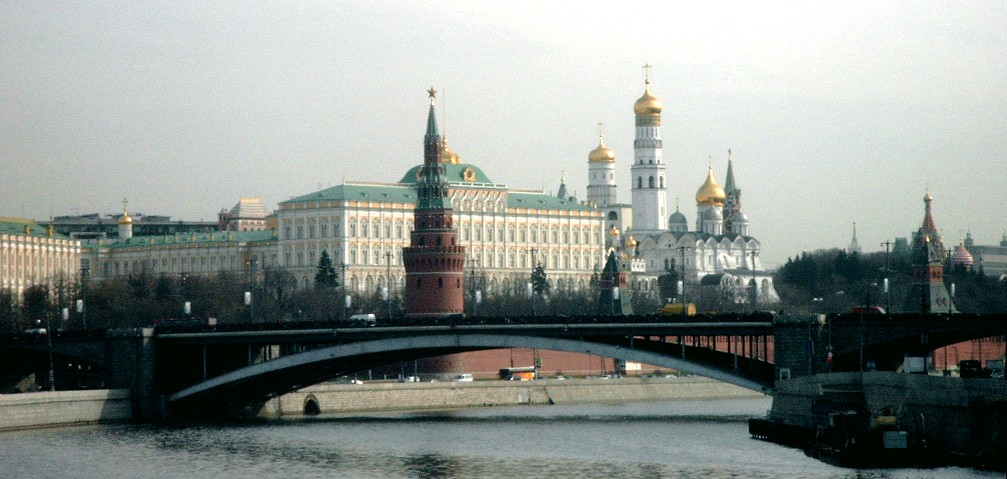
Churches of the Moscow Kremlin, as seen from the Balchug

The Russian Orthodox Church held a privileged position in the Russian Empire, expressed in the motto, Orthodoxy, Autocracy, and Nationality, of the late Russian Empire. It obtained immunity from taxation in 1270, and was allowed to impose taxes on the peasants. At the same time, it was placed under the control of the Tsar by the Church reform of Peter I in the 1721, who replaced the Russian patriarchate by the Most Holy Synod, which was run by an official, titled Ober-Procurator, appointed by the Tsar himself.

The church was involved in various campaigns of russification, and, as a consequence, it was accused of participating in anti-Jewish pogroms. In the case of anti-semitism and the anti-Jewish pogroms, no evidence is given of the direct participation of the church; many Russian Orthodox clerics, including senior hierarchs, openly defended persecuted Jews, at least starting in the second half of the 19th century. Also, the Church has no official position on Judaism as such. In modern times, Aleksandr Solzhenitsyn has been accused of antisemitism for his book Two Hundred Years Together, where he alleges Jewish participation in the political repression of the Soviet regime (see also Hebrew and Byzantine relations). Solzhenitsyn's book Two Hundred Years Together is a historical study of the relationship between Russian Orthodox Christians and Jews in Russia from 1772 to modern times.

The Church, like the Tsarist state was seen as an enemy of the people by the Bolsheviks and other Russian revolutionaries.

=== Soviet Union ===
The Russian Orthodox Church collaborated with the White Army in the Russian Civil War (see White movement) after the October Revolution. This may have further strengthened the Bolshevik animus against the church.

Before and after the October Revolution of 7 November 1917 (October 25 Old Calendar) there was a movement within the Soviet Union to unite all of the people of the world under Communist rule (see Communist International). This included the Eastern European bloc countries as well as the Balkan States. Since some of these Slavic states tied their ethnic heritage to their ethnic churches, both the peoples and their church were targeted by the Soviets and its form of state atheism. The Soviets' official religious stance was one of "religious freedom or tolerance", though the state established atheism as the only scientific truth. Criticism of atheism was strictly forbidden and sometimes resulted in imprisonment.

It is estimated that at least 23.9 million Christians (mostly Orthodox) were killed or died in Soviet gulags. Some actions against Orthodox priests and believers along with execution included torture being sent to prison camps, labour camps or mental hospitals. The result of state sponsored atheism was to transform the Church into a persecuted and martyred Church. In the first five years after the Bolshevik revolution, 28 bishops and 1,200 priests were executed.

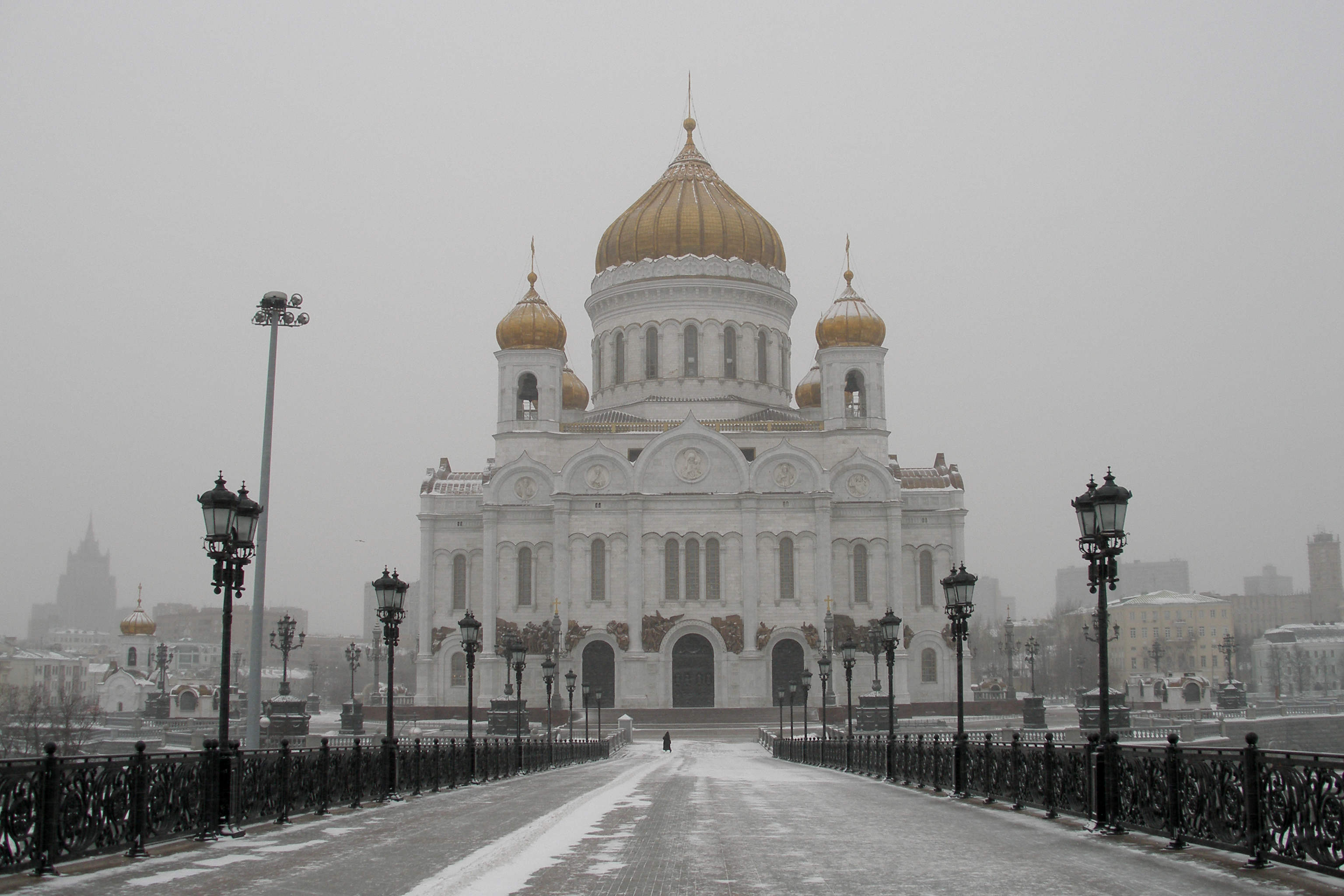
Christ the Savior Cathedral Moscow after reconstruction

In the period between 1927 and 1940, the number of Orthodox Churches in the Russian Republic fell from 29,584 to less than 500. Between 1917 and 1940, 130,000 Orthodox priests were arrested. The widespread persecution and internecine disputes within the church hierarchy led to the seat of the Patriarch of Moscow being vacant from 1925 to 1943. Some 20,000 people were executed just outside Butovo, a good percentage of which were Orthodox clergy, ascetics, and laymen.

In the Soviet Union, in addition to the methodical closing and destruction of churches, the charitable and social work formerly done by ecclesiastical authorities was taken over by the state. As with all private property, Church owned property was confiscated into public use. This persecution continued, even after the death of Stalin until the dissolution of the Soviet Union in 1991. Since the fall of the Soviet Union, the Russian Orthodox Church has recognized a number of New Martyrs as saints.

== Other Eastern Orthodox Churches under communist rule ==
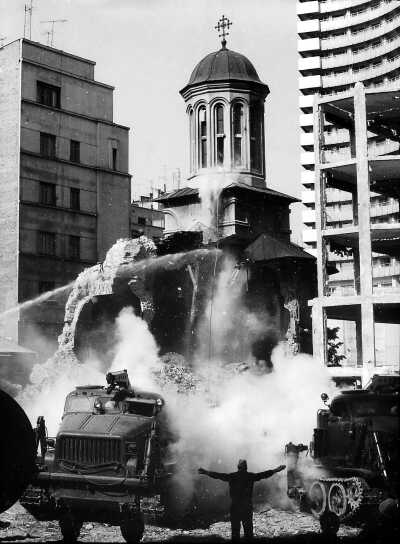
Enei Church, central Bucharest, Romania. It was purposely demolished by the Communist authorities at 10 March 1977 after the Vrancea earthquake.

Albania was the first state to have declared itself officially fully atheist. In some other communist states such as Romania, the Eastern Orthodox Church as an organisation enjoyed relative freedom and even prospered, albeit under strict secret police control. That, however, did not rule out demolishing churches and monasteries as part of broader systematization (urban planning), state persecution of individual believers, and Romania stands out as a country which ran a specialised institution where many Orthodox (along with peoples of other faiths) were subjected to psychological punishment or torture and mind control experimentation in order to force them give up their religious convictions (see Pitești Prison). However, this was only supported by one faction within the regime. The Communist authorities closed down the prison in 1952, and punished many of those responsible for abuses (twenty of them were sentenced to death).

== Eastern Catholic or "Byzantine Rite" churches ==
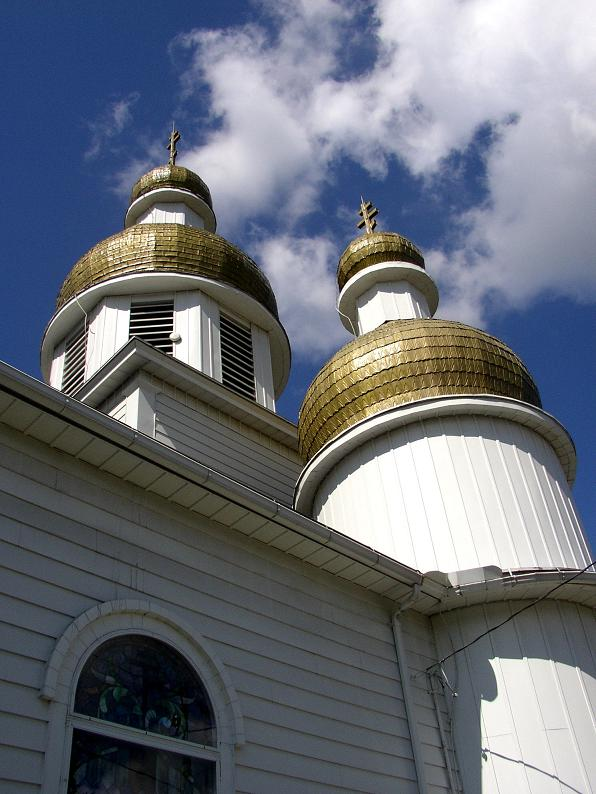
Domes of a Ukrainian Catholic parish in Simpson, Pennsylvania

The Eastern Catholic Churches make up 2% of the membership of the Roman Catholic Church and less than 10% of all Eastern Christians. Most Eastern Catholic churches have counterparts in other Eastern churches, whether Assyrian or Oriental Orthodox, from whom they are separated by a number of theological differences, or the Eastern Orthodox churches, from whom they are separated primarily by differences in understanding of the role of the Bishop of Rome within the College of Bishops.

The Eastern Catholic churches were located historically in Eastern Europe, the Asian Middle East, Northern Africa and India, but are now, because of migration, found also in Western Europe, the Americas and Oceania.

=== Origins ===
The Maronite Church and the Syro-Malabar Church are Eastern Catholic churches that never broke communion with the Church of Rome. Within the Antiochian church the Eastern Catholic movement started after the Ottoman Turks' conquest of Antioch in the early 15th century, under whose control it remained until the breakup of the Ottoman Empire at the end of World War I. During this period, in 1724, the Church of Antioch was again weakened by schism, as a major portion of its faithful came into communion with the See of Rome. The resultant body is known as the Melkite Greek Catholic Church, which maintains close ties with the Orthodox and is holding ongoing talks about healing the schism.

The movement to reestablish communion with the See of Rome within East-Central Europe was started with the 1598–1599 Union of Brest, by which the "Metropolia of Kiev-Halych and all Rus'" entered into relationship with the Roman Catholic Church.

A century later, a similar movement occurred in Romania, as described on the website of Delia Despina Dumitrica.

=== Conflict between Eastern Catholics and Eastern Orthodox ===
Since the beginnings of the Uniate movement, there have been periodic conflicts between the Orthodox and Uniate in Poland and Western Russia. During the Time of Troubles and Polish–Russian War, there was a plan (by the conquering Polish monarchy) to convert all of Russia to Roman Catholicism. Patriarch Hermogenes was martyred by the Roman Catholics during this period (see also Polish–Lithuanian–Muscovite Commonwealth).

The Eastern Catholic churches consider themselves to have reconciled the East and West Schism by keeping their prayers and rituals similar to those of Eastern Orthodoxy, while also accepting the primacy of the Bishop of Rome.

Some Orthodox charge that joining in this unity comes at the expense of ignoring critical doctrinal differences and past atrocities. From the perspective of many Eastern Orthodox, Eastern Catholicism is a ploy by Roman Catholicism to undermine and ultimately destroy their church by undermining its legitimacy and absorbing it into the Roman Catholic Church. It is feared that this ploy would diminish the power to the original eastern Patriarchs of the church and would require the acceptance of rejected doctrines and Scholasticism over faith.

In the 20th century, there have been conflicts which involved forced conversions both by the Roman Catholics and the Orthodox. In Croatia, the Ustaše forced the conversion of Orthodox to Roman Catholicism. Other forced conversions included the Roman Catholics inside the USSR and Eastern Bloc after the October Revolution.

== Modern history ==
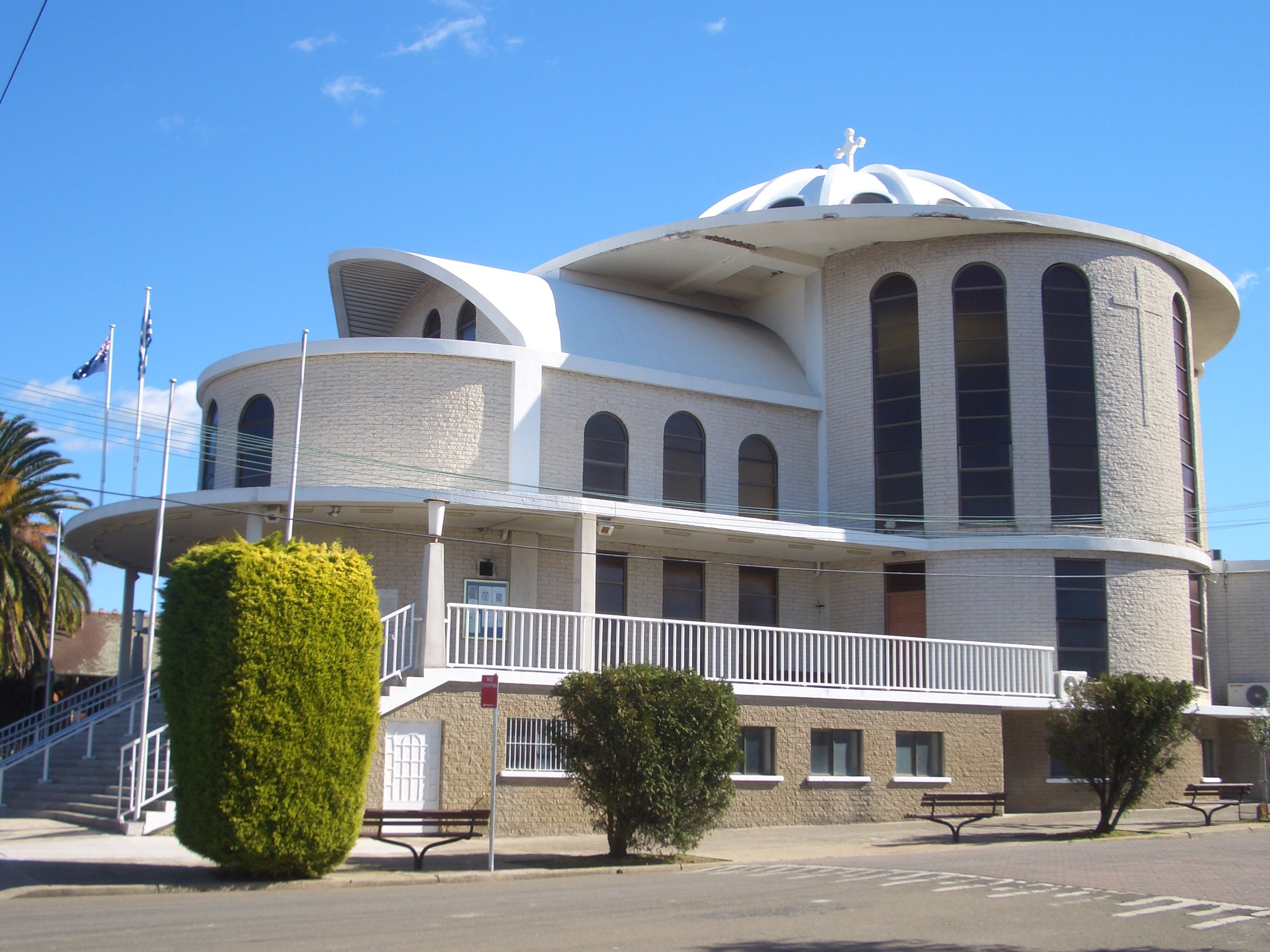
All Saints Belmore, New South Wales, Australia

The various autocephalous and autonomous churches of the Eastern Orthodox Church are distinct in terms of administration and local culture, but for the most part exist in full communion with one another, with exceptions such as lack of relations between the Russian Orthodox Church Outside Russia (ROCOR) and the Moscow Patriarchate (the Orthodox Church of Russia) dating from the 1920s and due to the subjection of the latter to the hostile Soviet regime. However, attempts at reconciliation were made between the ROCOR and the Moscow Patriarchate with the ultimate purpose of reunification being reached on 17 May 2007. Further tensions exist between the New Calendarists and the Old Calendarists.

== Autocephalous national churches ==
Timeline showing the main autocephalous Eastern Orthodox Churches, from an Eastern Orthodox point of view, up to 2022

- Greek Orthodoxy
  - Greek Orthodox Church of Antioch. The community and seat of the patriarchate according to Orthodox tradition was founded by St Peter and then given to St Ignatius, in what is now Turkey. However, in the 15th century, it was moved to Damascus in response to the Ottoman invasion of Antioch. Its traditional territory includes Syria, Lebanon, Iran, Iraq, Kuwait and parts of Turkey, while there is a large autonomous diaspora diocese in North America. The current Greek Orthodox Patriarchate of Antioch and All the East which is considered by the other bishops of the Orthodox Church to be the sole legitimate heir to the See of Antioch.
  - Church of Greece.
  - Church of Cyprus. Since the fall of the Ottoman Empire, the Church of Cyprus has been engaged in a struggle between rejoining the mainland Church of Greece, being reunited with the Turkish state and independence.
  - Greek Orthodox Church of Alexandria claims succession from the Apostle Mark the Evangelist who founded the Church in the 1st century, and therefore the beginning of Christianity in Africa. It is one of the five ancient patriarchates of the early Church, called the Pentarchy. Sometimes called the Greek Orthodox Patriarchate of Alexandria to distinguish it from the Coptic Orthodox Patriarchate of Alexandria. In Egypt, members of the Greek Orthodox Patriarchate were also called Melkite, because the favorable orientation of the Byzantine Emperor towards the Council of Chalcedon. The term Melkite is currently used to describe the Melkite Greek Catholic Church members. Since the schism occurring as a result of the political and Christological controversies at the Council of Chalcedon (451), the Greek Orthodox have liturgically been Greek-speaking. After the Arab conquest of North Africa in the 7th century the Orthodox were a minority even among Christians, and remained small for centuries. Today, the Patriarchate of Alexandria in Egypt comprises some 300,000 Orthodox Christians, the highest number since the Roman Empire.
- Georgian Orthodox Church. The first Eparchy was founded in Georgia, traditionally by the Apostle Andrew. In 327, Christianity was adopted as the state religion by the rulers of Iberia (Eastern Georgia). From the 320s, the Georgian Orthodox Church was under the jurisdiction of the Apostolic See of Antioch. The Georgian Orthodox Church become autocephalous (independent) in 466 when the Patriarchate of Antioch elevated the Bishop of Mtskheta to the rank of "Catholicos of Kartli". On March 3, 1990, the Patriarch of Constantinople re-approved the autocephaly of the Georgian Orthodox Church (which had in practice been exercised or at least claimed since the 5th century) as well as the Patriarchal honour of the Catholicos. Today the Georgian Orthodox Church has around 5 million members around the world (of whom about 3,670,000 live within Georgia) and administers, as of 2007, 35 eparchies (dioceses).
- The Bulgarian Orthodox Church lost its autocephalous status after the fall of Bulgaria to the Ottoman Empire. Bulgarian autocephaly was restored in 1953.

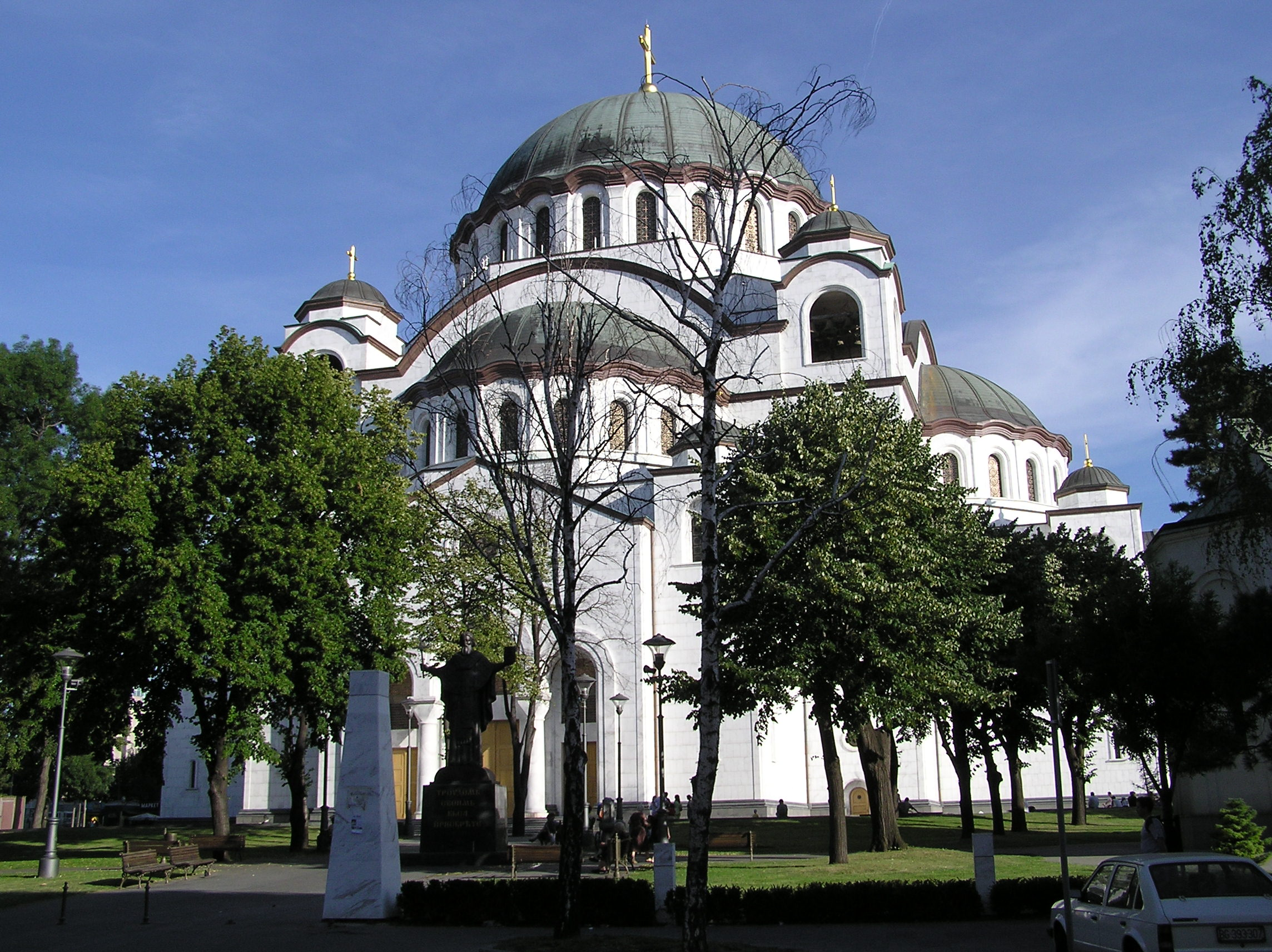
Saint Sava Cathedral with the monument of Saint Sava

- Serbian Orthodox Church gained autocephaly in 1219, patriarchate status in 1345, while it was abolished in long periods during the Ottoman period. The Patriarchate was reunited in 1919–22.
- Romanian Orthodox Church. Today the largest self-governing Church after Russia, it was declared autocephalous in 1885 and became a patriarchate in 1925.

== Relationship with Oriental Orthodoxy ==
The Coptic Cross, a symbol of Oriental Orthodoxy

The Orthodox Church is often referred to as Eastern Orthodox Church in order to distinguish it from Oriental Orthodoxy (despite the fact that eastern and oriental are synonyms).

The (Eastern) Orthodox Church strives to keep the faith of the seven Ecumenical Councils. In contrast, the term "Oriental Orthodoxy" refers to the churches of Eastern Christian traditions that keep the faith of only the first three ecumenical councils. Both the Eastern Orthodox and Oriental Orthodox churches formally believe themselves to be the continuation of the true church and the other to have fallen into schism, although in the past 20 years much work has been done toward ecumenism or reconciliation between the Oriental and Eastern Orthodox churches. There has been an attempt to achieve ecumenism (Russian: sobornost) between the Antiochian and Oriental Orthodox churches. At Chambesy in Switzerland, plenary talks were held resulting in agreements in 1989, 1990 and 1993. All official representatives of the Eastern Orthodox and the Oriental Orthodox reached agreement in these dialogues that the Christological differences between the two communions are more a matter of emphasis than of substance. Although elements in a number of the Eastern Orthodox Churches have criticized the apparent consensus reached by the representatives at Chambesy, the patriarch and holy synod of the Antiochian Orthodox Church welcomed the agreements as positive moves towards a sharing in the Love of God, and a rejection of the hatred of insubstantial division. As recommended in the Second Chambesy Agreement of 1990, the Antiochian (Eastern) Orthodox Patriarch Ignatius IV formally met with the Syriac (Oriental) Orthodox Patriarch, Ignatius Zakka I, on 22 July 1991. At that meeting, the two patriarchs signed a pastoral agreement which called for "complete and mutual respect between the two churches". It also prohibited the passing of faithful from one church to the other, envisaged joint meetings of the two holy synods when appropriate, and provided for future guidelines for inter-communion of the faithful and Eucharistic concelebration by the clergy of the two churches. The Church of Antioch expects these guidelines to be issued when the faithful of both churches are ready, but not before. Patriarch Ignatius has also overseen participation in a bilateral commission with the Melkite Greek Catholic Church, which is exploring ways of healing the 18th century schism between the Melkite Catholics and the Antiochian Orthodox. In an unprecedented event, Melkite Patriarch Maximos V addressed a meeting of the Orthodox holy synod in October 1996. The members of the holy synod of Antioch continue to explore greater communication and more friendly meetings with their Syriac, Melkite, and Maronite brothers and sisters, who all share a common heritage.

== Minority communities ==
Distribution of Eastern Orthodoxy in the world by country Dominant religion Important minority religion (over 10%)

=== European minorities ===
The Orthodox Churches in Czechoslovakia, East Germany, Hungary, and Poland have seen drastic changes since the fall of Communism. The Czech Church has recognized contemporary New Martyrs, such as Gorazd (Pavlik) of Prague. The Albanian Orthodox Church split from the Greek Orthodox Church and declared its independence (autocephaly) in 1922. The recognition of the primate by Constantinople came in 1937.

=== Churches in Asia ===
Judging from the New Testament account of the rise and expansion of the early church, during the first few centuries of Christianity, the most extensive dissemination of the gospel was not in the West but in the East. In fact, conditions in the Parthian empire (250 BC – AD 226), which stretched from the Euphrates to the Indus rivers and the Caspian to the Arabian seas, were in some ways more favourable for the growth of the church than in the Roman world. And though opposition to Christianity increasingly mounted under successive Persian and Islamic rulers, Christian communities were eventually established in the vast territory which stretches from the Near to the Far East possibly as early as the first century of the church.

- Chinese Orthodox Church
- Japanese Orthodox Church
- Korean Orthodox Church
- Philippine Orthodox Church

=== Churches in the Americas ===
In the 1700s, the Russian Empire began its Colonization of Alaska. Overtime, Russian monks, notably Herman of Alaska, began arriving, with the first group arriving in 1794. Aside from ministering to Russian sailors and tradesmen, they converted large amounts of the Alaskan Natives to Russian Orthodoxy, especially the Aleuts. Many of these clergymen also protested the maltreatment of natives at the hands of the Russian-American Company, and became the defenders of the natives. In 1867, Russia sold Alaska to the United States. Despite major and partially successful efforts by American authorities to assimilate natives into American Protestantism, Orthodox Christianity persisted. Today, estimated from 10,000–50,000 Alaskan Orthodox remain, many of whom are Alaskan Natives, with smaller numbers of people of Slavic descent and converts.

In the continental US, Immigration to America started increasing during the late 19th and early 20th centuries. Many of these immigrants came from Orthodox populated lands in Eastern Europe, Southern Europe, and the Middle East. As a result, their respective churches sent priests and bishops to minister to these communities, notably people like Tikhon of Moscow and Raphael of Brooklyn. Alexis Toth, a former Eastern Catholic priest, left and converted to Orthodoxy, bringing many Carpathian Rusyns and other Uniates to Orthodoxy. By 1920, about 250 thousand Orthodox people were in the US, most either being Alaskan Natives, immigrants, or descendants of immigrants. As the decades progressed, the churches stabilized, adding institutions like Saint Tikhon's Orthodox Theological Seminary. In 1970, the Orthodox Church in America obtained autocephly from the Russian Orthodox Church, becoming the first canonical ‘American’ church. As of 2020, numbers are at roughly 600 thousand people, with the Greek Orthodox Archdiocese of America, Orthodox Church of America, and Antiochian Orthodox Christian Archdiocese of North America being the largest, followed by many smaller jurisdictions. A further 620 thousand Orthodox Christians are in Canada as of 2021, and over 100 thousand more in Mexico. There has been attempts in one American Orthodox Church, such as the Ligonier Meeting, though thus far they are not successful. Since the COVID-19 pandemic, Orthodox Christianity has been seeing converts, mainly from non Orthodox backgrounds, arrive.

== See also ==
- Christian Church
- Church Fathers
- Eastern Orthodox Christian theology
- History of Arab Christians
- History of Christianity
- History of Eastern Christianity
- Pentarchy
- Seven Ecumenical Councils
- Eastern Orthodoxy in Greece
- Western Rite Orthodoxy
- Eastern Orthodoxy in North America
- Timeline of Eastern Orthodoxy in North America

Other Eastern apostolic churches:

- Oriental Orthodoxy
- History of Oriental Orthodoxy
- Church of the East
- Eastern Rite Roman Catholicism

Historical writers:

- Metropolitan Hilarion (Alfeyev)
- James H. Billington
- Jaroslav Pelikan
- Sergey Solovyov
- Metropolitan Kallistos (Ware)

== Sources ==
- Baán, István (1997). "The Foundation of the Archbishopric of Kalocsa: The Byzantine Origin of the Second Archdiocese in Hungary". Early Christianity in Central and East Europe. Warszawa: Semper. pp. 67–74. ISBN 9788386951338.
- Baán, István (1999). "The Metropolitanate of Tourkia: The Organization of the Byzantine Church in Hungary in the Middle Ages". Byzanz und Ostmitteleuropa 950–1453. Wiesbaden: Harrassowitz Verlag. pp. 45–53. ISBN 9783447041461.
- Barry, David Sheldon (1976). The Patriarchate of Jerusalem in the fifth and sixth centuries. Madison: University of Wisconsin.
- Curta, Florin (2006). Southeastern Europe in the Middle Ages, 500–1250. Cambridge: Cambridge University Press. ISBN 9780521815390.
- Dowling, Theodore Edward (1913). The Orthodox Greek Patriarchate of Jerusalem. London: Society for promoting Christian knowledge.
- Fine, John Van Antwerp Jr. (1991) [1983]. The Early Medieval Balkans: A Critical Survey from the Sixth to the Late Twelfth Century. Ann Arbor, Michigan: University of Michigan Press. ISBN 0472081497.
- Fine, John Van Antwerp Jr. (1994) [1987]. The Late Medieval Balkans: A Critical Survey from the Late Twelfth Century to the Ottoman Conquest. Ann Arbor, Michigan: University of Michigan Press. ISBN 0472082604.
- Fine, John Van Antwerp Jr. (2005). When Ethnicity did not Matter in the Balkans: A Study of Identity in Pre-Nationalist Croatia, Dalmatia, and Slavonia in the Medieval and Early-Modern Periods. Ann Arbor, Michigan: University of Michigan Press. ISBN 0472025600.
- Frazee, Charles A. (2006) [1983]. Catholics and Sultans: The Church and the Ottoman Empire 1453–1923. Cambridge: Cambridge University Press. ISBN 9780521027007.
- Hage, Wolfgang (2007). Das orientalische Christentum. Stuttgart: Kohlhammer Verlag. ISBN 9783170176683.
- The Orthodox Church; 455 Questions and Answers. Harakas, Stanley H. Light and Life Publishing Company, 1988. (ISBN 0-937032-56-5)
- Kiminas, Demetrius (2009). The Ecumenical Patriarchate: A History of Its Metropolitanates with Annotated Hierarch Catalogs. Wildside Press LLC. ISBN 9781434458766.
- Koszta, László (2014). "Byzantine Archiepiscopal Ecclesiastical System in Hungary?". The Carpathian Basin, the Hungarians and Byzantium. Szeged: Szegedi Tudományegyetem. pp. 127–143.
- Kursar, Vjeran (2013). "Non-Muslim Communal Divisions and Identities in the Early Modern Ottoman Balkans and the Millet System Theory". Power and Influence in South-Eastern Europe, 16th–19th century. Berlin: LIT Verlag. pp. 97–108. ISBN 9783643903310.
- Laurent, Vitalien (1968). "Les premiers patriarches de Constantinople sous la domination turque (1454–1476): Succession et chronologie d'après un catalogue inédit". Revue des études byzantines. 26: 229–263. doi:10.3406/rebyz.1968.1407.
- Madgearu, Alexandru (2008). "The Mission of Hierotheos: Location and Significance". Byzantinoslavica. 66: 119–138.
- Madgearu, Alexandru (2017). "Further Considerations on Hierotheos' Mission to the Magyars". Acta Musei Napocensis. 54 (2): 1–16.
- Meyendorff, John (1989). Imperial unity and Christian divisions: The Church 450–680 A.D. Crestwood, NY: St. Vladimir's Seminary Press. ISBN 9780881410563.
- Meyendorff, John (1996). Rome, Constantinople, Moscow: Historical and Theological Studies. Crestwood, NY: St. Vladimir's Seminary Press. ISBN 9780881411348.
- Ostrogorsky, George (1956). History of the Byzantine State. Oxford: Basil Blackwell.
- Peri, Oded (2001). Christianity Under Islam in Jerusalem: The Question of the Holy Sites in Early Ottoman Times. Brill. ISBN 9004120424.
- Orthodox Dogmatic Theology: A Concise Exposition, by Michael Pomazansky St Herman of Alaska Brotherhood press 1994 (ISBN 0938635-69-7)
- History of the Orthodox Church in the History of Russian Dimitry Pospielovsky 1998 St Vladimir's Press (ISBN 0-88141-179-5)
- Radojević, Mira; Mićić, Srđan B. (2015). "Serbian Orthodox Church cooperation and frictions with Ecumenical Patriarchate of Constantinople and Bulgarian Exarchate during interwar period". Studia academica šumenesia. 2: 126‒143.
- Runciman, Steven (1985) [1968]. The Great Church in Captivity: A Study of the Patriarchate of Constantinople from the Eve of the Turkish Conquest to the Greek War of Independence (2nd ed.). Cambridge: Cambridge University Press. ISBN 9780521313100.
- The Spirituallity of the Christian East: A Systematic Handbook by Tomas Spidlik, Cistercian Publications Inc Kalamazoo Michigan 1986 ISBN 0-87907-879-0
- Thomas, John P. (1987). Private Religious Foundations in the Byzantine Empire. Washington, D.C.: Dumbarton Oaks. ISBN 9780884021643.
- Véghseő, Tamás (2015). "Reflections on the Background to the Union of Uzhhorod / Ungvár (1646)" (PDF). Eastern Theological Journal. 1 (1): 147–181.
- The Orthodox Church. Ware, Timothy. Penguin Books, 1997. (ISBN 0-14-014656-3)
