= Quinisext Council =

7th-century church council

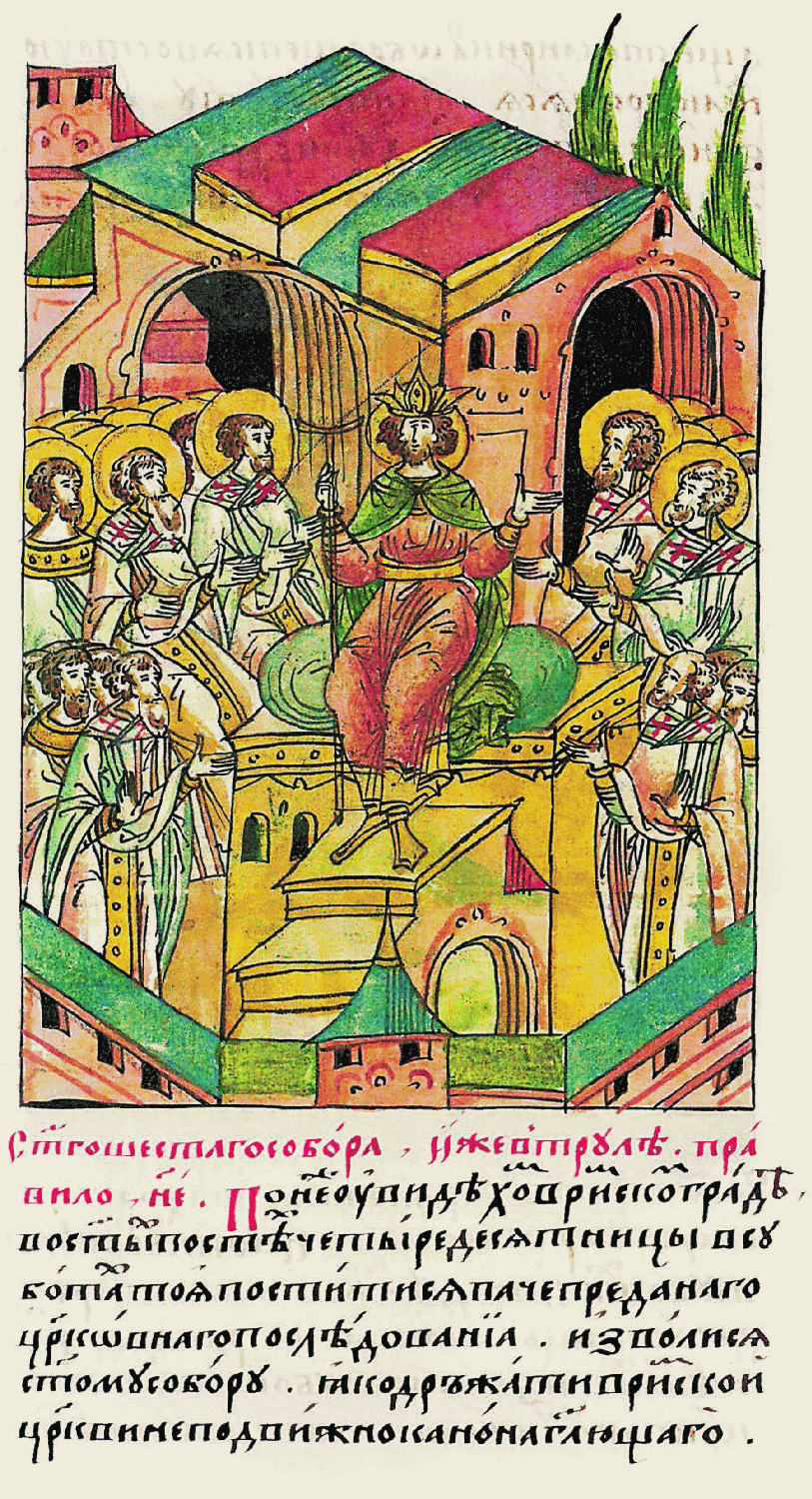
- A 16th-century Russian depiction of the council
- Date: 692
- Accepted by: Eastern Orthodoxy
- Previous council: Third Council of Constantinople
- Next council: Second Council of Nicaea
- Convoked by: Emperor Justinian II
- President: Justinian II
- Topics: Discipline
- Documents and statements: Basis for Eastern Orthodox canon law

The Quinisext Council (Latin: Concilium Quinisextum; Koine Greek: Πενθέκτη Σύνοδος, romanized: Penthéktē Sýnodos, literally meaning, Fifth-Sixth Meeting), i.e., the Fifth-Sixth Council, often called the Council in Trullo, Trullan Council, or the Penthekte Synod, was a church council held in 692 at Constantinople under Justinian II.

The synod is known as the "Council in Trullo" because, like the Sixth Ecumenical Council, it was held in a domed hall in the Imperial Palace (τρούλος [troúlos], meaning a cup or dome). Both the Fifth and the Sixth Ecumenical Councils had omitted to draw up disciplinary canons, and as this council was intended to complete both in this respect, it took the name of Quinisext.

== Decisions ==
Many of the council's canons were reiterations. It endorsed not only the six ecumenical councils already held (canon 1), but also:

- the 85 Apostolic Canons,
- the Synod of Ancyra
- the Synod of Neocaesarea,
- the Synod of Gangra,
- the Synod of Antioch in 341,
- the Council of Serdica,
- the Synod of Laodicea,
- Councils of Carthage,
- the Council of Constantinople (394)

The council also confirmed authority of Church Fathers:

- 4 canons of Pope Dionysius of Alexandria,
- 12 canons of Gregory Thaumaturgus,
- 15 canons of Peter I of Alexandria,
- 3 canons of Athanasius of Alexandria [including 39th Festal Letter of Athanasius (canon 2)],
- 18 canons of Timothy I of Alexandria,
- 92 canons of Basil of Caesarea,
- 1 canon of Gregory of Nazianzus,
- 8 canons of Gregory of Nyssa,
- 1 canon of Amphilochius of Iconium,
- 14 canons of Theophilus I of Alexandria,
- 5 canons of Cyril of Alexandria,
- 1 canon of Gennadius of Constantinople,

=== Ban on pre-Christian practices ===
The Council banned certain festivals and practices which were thought to have a Pagan origin. Therefore, the Council gives some insight to historians about pre-Christian religious practices. As a consequence, neither cleric nor layman was allowed to observe the Pagan festivals of Vota, the Kalends or the Brumalia.

=== Ritual observance ===
Many of the council's canons were aimed at settling differences in ritual observance and clerical discipline in different parts of Christendom. Being held under Byzantine auspices, with an exclusively Eastern clergy, these overwhelmingly took the practice of the Church of Constantinople as orthodox.

==== Armenian practices ====
The council explicitly condemned some customs of Armenian Christians; among them using wine unmixed with water for the Eucharist, choosing children of clergy for appointment as clergy, and eating eggs and cheese on Saturdays and Sundays of Lent. And the council proclaimed deposition for clergy and excommunication for laypeople who contravened the canons prohibiting these practices.

==== Roman (Western) practices ====
Likewise, it reprobated, with similar penalties, the Latin custom of not allowing married men to be ordained to the diaconate or priesthood unless they vowed for perpetual continence and living separately from their wives, and fasting on Saturdays of Lent. Nevertheless, it also prescribed continence during those times when serving at the altar. Without contrasting with the practice of the Western Church, it also prescribed that the celebration of the Eucharist in Lent should only happen in Saturdays, Sundays, and the feast of the Annunciation.

==== Eucharist, liturgy, evangelising, baptism ====
Milk and honey were not to be offered at the altar, nor were grapes to be mixed with wine for the oblation. Whoever came to receive the Eucharist may receive in the hand by holding his hands in the form of a cross, but was forbidden from receiving the Eucharist in vessels of gold or other materials. The Eucharist was not allowed to be given to dead bodies. During the liturgy the psalms were to be sung in modest and dulcet tones, and the phrase 'who was crucified for us' was not to be added to the Trisagion. Prelates were to preach the gospel as propounded by the fathers. Priests received special instructions on how to deal with those who were not baptized and they were also given rubrics to follow on how to admit heretics to the faith. Women were not permitted to speak at the time of the Divine Liturgy.

=== Moral guidelines for clerics and laity ===
In addition to these, the council also condemned clerics that had improper or illicit relations with women. It condemned simony and the charging of fees for administering the Eucharist. It enjoined those in holy orders from entering public houses, engaging in usurious practices, attending horse races in the Hippodrome, wearing unsuitable clothes or celebrating the liturgy in private homes (eukterion) without the consent of their bishops. Both clergy and laity were forbidden from gambling with dice, attending theatrical performances, or consulting soothsayers. No one was allowed to own a house of prostitution, engage in abortion, arrange hair in ornate plaits or to promote pornography. It also ordered law students at the University of Constantinople to cease wearing "clothing contrary to the general custom". Consumption of any blood either directly or through meat was prohibited on pain of deposition and excommunication for clergy, and excommunication for laity.

== Acceptance ==
Pope Sergius I refused to sign the decrees of the Quinisext Council when they were sent to him, rejecting them as "lacking authority" and describing them as containing "novel errors." Efforts to compel his signature were ultimately unsuccessful.

During the pontificate of Pope Constantine, a compromise approach appears to have been taken. This position was later articulated in the ninth century by Pope John VIII, who stated that he "accepted all those canons which did not contradict the true faith, good morals, and the decrees of Rome."

Nearly a century later, Pope Hadrian I conditionally recognized the Trullan decrees in a letter to Tarasius of Constantinople, attributing them to the Sixth Synod. He affirmed: "I receive the sixth sacred council with all its canons which have been promulgated according to divine law (jure ac divinitus), among which is contained that in which reference is made to a Lamb being pointed to by the Precursor as being found in certain of the venerable images."

== See also ==
- Pentarchy
- First seven Ecumenical Councils
