= Ancient church councils (pre-ecumenical) =

Christian councils

In Christianity, Church councils are formal meetings of bishops and representatives of several churches who are brought together to regulate points of doctrine or discipline. The meetings may be of a single ecclesiastical community or may involve an ecclesiastical province, a nation or other civil region, or the whole Church. Some of those convoked from the Church as a whole have been recognized as ecumenical councils and are considered particularly authoritative. The first ecumenical council is that of Nicaea, called by the Emperor Constantine in 325.

Pre-ecumenical councils, those earlier than AD 325, were mostly local or provincial. Some, held in the second half of the 3rd century, involved more than one province. The sui generis Council of Jerusalem was a meeting, described in the Bible in Acts 15 and possibly in Galatians 2, of the apostles and elders of the local Church in Jerusalem.

In spite of lacking the authority of the decisions of ecumenical councils, the teachings and decrees of these pre-ecumenical councils are sometimes considered to be binding on the faithful in varying degrees, in particular certain councils held in Carthage and Elvira. But even the Council of Jerusalem's decisions, known as the Apostolic Decree, in particular the obligation to abstain from eating blood or what has been strangled, are not accepted by all Christian churches.

== Apostolic Council of Jerusalem ==
The Acts of the Apostles records, without using for it the term "council" or "synod", what has been called the Council of Jerusalem: to respond to a consultation by Paul of Tarsus, the apostles and elders of the Church in Jerusalem met to address the question of observance of biblical law in the early Christian community, which included Gentile converts. This is the only such meeting recorded in the New Testament, and may be referred to also in the Epistle to the Galatians. This meeting of the Church in Jerusalem was not a gathering of representatives coming from all areas, like an ecumenical council. It is called the Apostolic Council, because of the participation in it of the apostles. This gives it a character different from the normal pre-ecumenical church councils, and for that reason to call it a council may be misleading. It took place around the year 50.

== Normal pre-ecumenical councils ==
In times of greater toleration, Christian leaders felt sufficiently secure to hold councils governing their see or metropolitan area. None of the councils of this period gathered representatives from all the Christian churches, or even from those throughout the Roman Empire. The acts of only a few councils are preserved in surviving writings; most are known only from accounts in works of church historians and other writers. These include:

- the Council of Rome of 155
- the Council of Rome of 193
- the Council of Ephesus of 193
- the Council of Carthage of 251
- the Council of Iconium of 258
- the Council of Antioch of 264
- the Councils of Arabia of 246–247
- the Synod of Elvira of 306
- the Council of Carthage of 311
- the Synod of Neo-Caesarea of c. 314
- the Synod of Ancyra of 314
- the Synod of Arles of 314

Such councils began to appear only in the middle of the 2nd century, at first at local level, but from 175 onward they involved several communities together, with such activity particularly marked in Italy and Asia Minor. At the end of that century, it became the practice to inform other communities of the decisions taken at such assemblies. In the 3rd century, the meetings began to be held at regular intervals, a custom that appeared first in the Roman province of Africa. In the second half of that century, councils were held at Antioch that gathered representatives of Christianity throughout the Middle East, from the Black Sea to Egypt. These were a prelude to the holding of the first assembly of all bishops, the First Council of Nicaea, the event that marked the end of the period of the ancient pre-ecumenical councils.

=== Examples of matters discussed ===
The earliest known church councils were held in Asia Minor in the mid-2nd century. They condemned Montanism. One of these was held at Hierapolis, presided over by the local bishop, Apollinaris Claudius, and attended by 26 other bishops. Another council of 13 bishops was held at Anchialus under the presidency of Bishop Sotas.

In 193, a series of councils was held in Palestine, Pontus and Osrhoene in the east, and in Rome and Gaul in the west concerning Quartodecimanism. They all condemned the practice in the Roman province of Asia (Western Anatolia), where Easter was celebrated at the Passover full moon rather than on the following Sunday. Victor, Bishop of Rome, who presided over the council in Rome, communicated its decision to Polycrates of Ephesus and the churches of the Roman province of Asia, asking Polycrates to convoke a council of the bishops of the province. Accordingly, Polycrates held at Ephesus within the same year the requested synod, which rejected Victor's demand that they change their paschal tradition.

The Synod of Elvira (southern Spain) laid down common rules to be observed by all the bishops of the area, rules almost entirely concerned with the conduct of various elements of the Christian community. Sanctions include long delays before baptism, exclusion from the Eucharist for periods of months or years, or indefinitely, sometimes with an exception for the death-bed, though this is also specifically excluded in some cases. Periods of penance, often for sexual offenses, extend to five or 10 years. Its canon 33 enjoined complete continence upon all clerics, married or not, and all who minister at the altar.

The Synod of Ancyra (modern Ankara) laid down rules about the penances to be performed by Christians who had lapsed during the persecutions (canons 1–8). It allowed marriage for deacons who before ordination had declared their inability to remain unmarried (canon 9). It forbade chorepiscopi (clergy in country parts who were of lower rank than the bishops of cities) to ordain deacons or priests.

=== Participants ===
Chorepiscopi seem to have been able to participate in councils on a par with bishops: they are mentioned in relation to the Council of Neocaesarea in 314 and even in two of the earliest ecumenical councils (325 and 431), but the office was abolished before 451, when the Council of Chalcedon was held.

From the mid-3rd century, mention is made of participation by others, at first in Africa, where Cyprian had at his councils in Carthage not only bishops but also priests and deacons and, in addition, laymen in good standing, as was expected of him also in the letters sent to him from Rome; but as he sometimes speaks of the bishops alone as participants, it is likely that the right to a deciding vote was restricted to them. Participation by clergy other than bishops is mentioned also in relation to councils held at Antioch in 264 or 265 and in 269, in two Councils of Arabia (246-247) and in the Council of Elvira (306). Sometimes priests as well as bishops signed the acts, but one such document (of 448) indicates that they signed without having had a voice in the council's decisions.

== See also ==
- First seven Ecumenical Councils
- Plenary council
- Primacy of the Roman Pontiff
