= Panagia Chrysopolitissa =

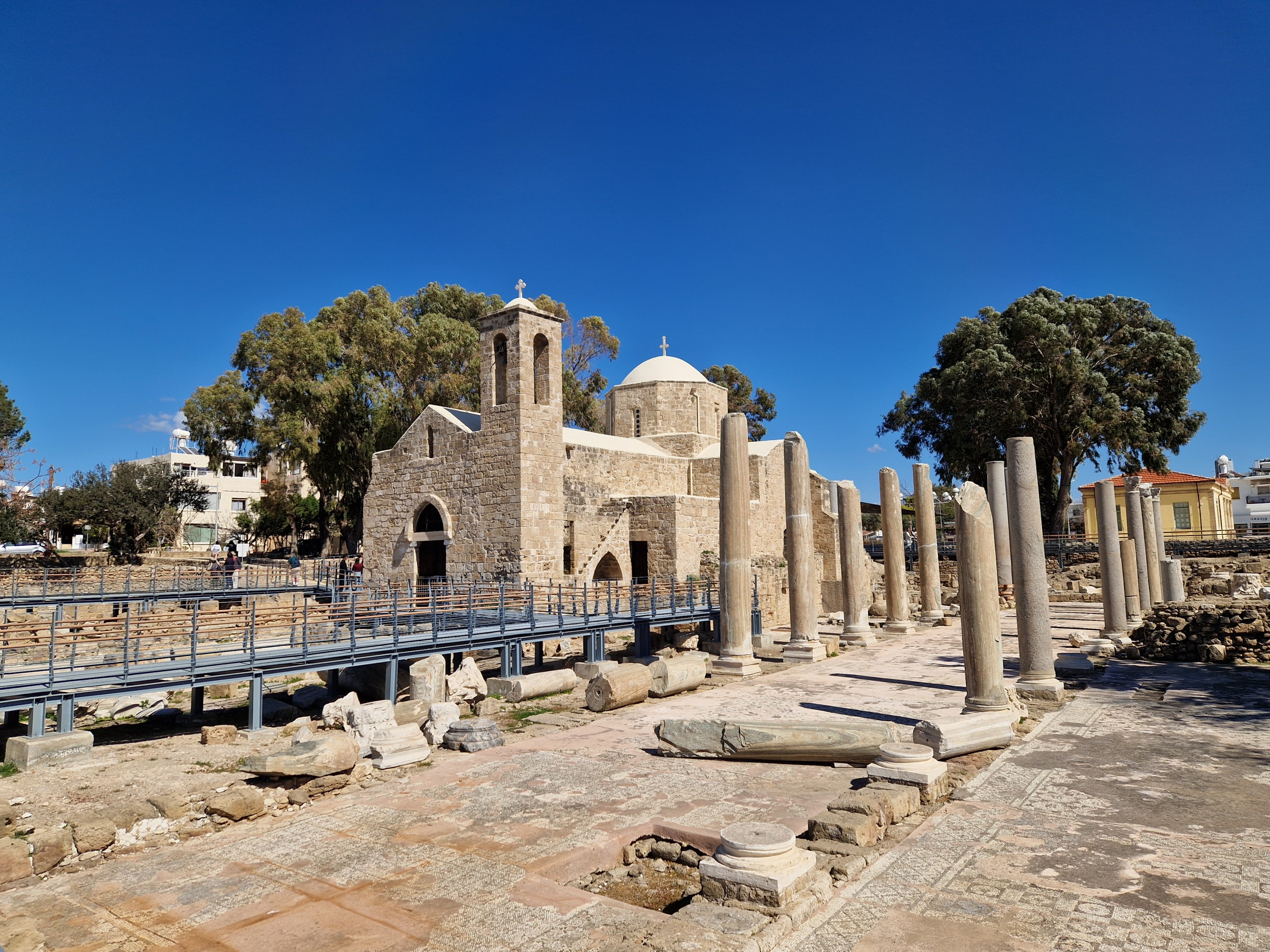
- Basilica in ruin field, 2026
- Panagia Chrysopolitissa
- 34°45′28″N 32°24′51″E
- Location: Paphos
- Country: Cyprus
- Denomination: Catholic

History
- Dedication: Agia Kyriaki

Architecture
- Architectural type: Basilica
- Style: Romanesque
- Completed: 13th century

Panagia Chrysopolitissa is an early Christian basilica church from the 13t century in Paphos, Cyprus, which is used by a local Catholic parish. It is also known as Agia Kyriaki.

== History ==
The early Christian church building in Paphos, Cyprus, Panagia Chrysopolitissa, was built in the 13th century on the ruins of a much larger previous basilica. This early building was the largest basilica of the Byzantine period and featured seven naves. It was built in the Temple of Chrysopolitissa is one of the oldest and largest basilicas in Cyprus. It was built in the 4th century and is believed to have been the seat of he bishop of Paphos to the 7th century. The building was changed to five aisles in the 6th century. The field of ruins includes the St. Paul Column, at which according to legend Paul the Apostle was flagellated by the Roman governor before the Roman converted to Christianity.

The floor of the later church is partly covered with colourful mosaics. They mostly contain geometric patterns of circles depicting beetles, vine leaves and crosses. Some mosaics show allegorical images from the New Testament and the Psalms, including some human forms that were generally avoided. It is dedicated to Agia Kyriaki.

== Presence ==
The church on the large historic site is used by a local Catholic parish.
