= Anselm of Havelberg =

German bishop (c. 1100–1158)

Anselm of Havelberg (c. 1100 – 1158) was a German bishop, statesman, secular and religious ambassador to Constantinople. He was a Premonstratensian, a defender of his order, a critic of the monastic life of his time, and a theorist of Christian history. According to Friedrich Heer, "the peculiar course of Anselm's life made this much-travelled man the theologian of development, of progress, of the right of novelty in the Church".

== Life ==
Anselm's birthplace is uncertain. He was a pupil of Norbert of Xanten at Laon, and then was appointed to the Bishopric of Havelberg in the Northern March. Because Havelberg was then controlled by the Polabian Slavs, Anselm's provisional seat was in Jerichow. He served as papal legate and overall commander of the 1147 Wendish Crusade. After Havelberg was recovered by the Saxons during the campaign, cathedral construction was begun.

Anselm was sent by Lothair III, Holy Roman Emperor, to Constantinople in 1136. in the hope of a Byzantine alliance. He held theological discussions with Nicetas of Nicomedia, an account of which he wrote later at the request of Pope Eugenius III. His account tended to play down the theological differences, including the filioque clause, but was more stark on the political issues. A later encounter with Basil of Achrida in 1154 proved fruitless.

He lived in a time when there was a growth in the diversity of religious orders. In his Epistola apologetica (c. 1145/46), his first major work, Anselm defended the emerging movement of regular canons against the criticism of traditional monastic orders such as the Benedictines. While these valued a strong emphasis on the contemplative life along with a detachment from the (lay) world, the regular canons were, in Anselm's view, the perfect representation of a priestly balance between contemplation and action in constant contact with the laity through preaching, the sacraments and works of charity. These arguments were mostly devised to defend communities of regular canons in general (e.g. against the danger of losing members to monastic orders), but also helped to strengthen the religious identity of Anselm's own community of regular canons, i.e. the Norbertines.

In the first book of his second major work entitled Antikeimenon or Dialogues (c. 1149), unlike those who were scandalized by the novelty of these new orders, he saw these orders as part of God's plan for the renewal of the church. In his Dialogues, he mentions several new religious movements, who - according to critics - "devise for themselves a new [way] of psalmody; establish new ways of abstinence and measures of food; and follow neither the monks who fight under the rule of Benedict nor Augustine". Anselm's refutation of such critics consists in a detailed analysis of how the Triune God (particularly the third person, i.e. the Holy Spirit) reveals Himself through historical renewal and progress. Books II and III of the Dialogues present Anselm's (certainly more or less idealized and remodelled) account of his theological discussions with Nicetas of Nicomedia about the questions that had led to the Schism of 1054.

Anselm also served as Archbishop of Ravenna from 1155–58. He died in Milan.

== Works ==
The Epistola apologetica is available both in the old (and faulty) edition of the Patrologia Latina and in a critical edition with German translation and commentary, including an analysis of all eight surviving manuscripts.

The three Dialogi (Greek title Antikeimenon) are currently only available in the edition of the Patrologia Latina.
