= Councils of Arabia =

The Councils of Arabia were two councils of the early Christian Church held in Bostra, in Arabia Petraea; one in 246 and the other in 247. Both were held against Beryllus, the local bishop, and his followers, who believed that the soul perished upon the death of the body, but that it would one day rise with the body. Origen, who was present at both councils, convinced them that their belief was heretical.

== See also ==
- Ancient church councils (pre-ecumenical)
