= Synod of Elvira =

Christian ecclesiastical synod held at Elvira in the Roman province of Hispania Baetica

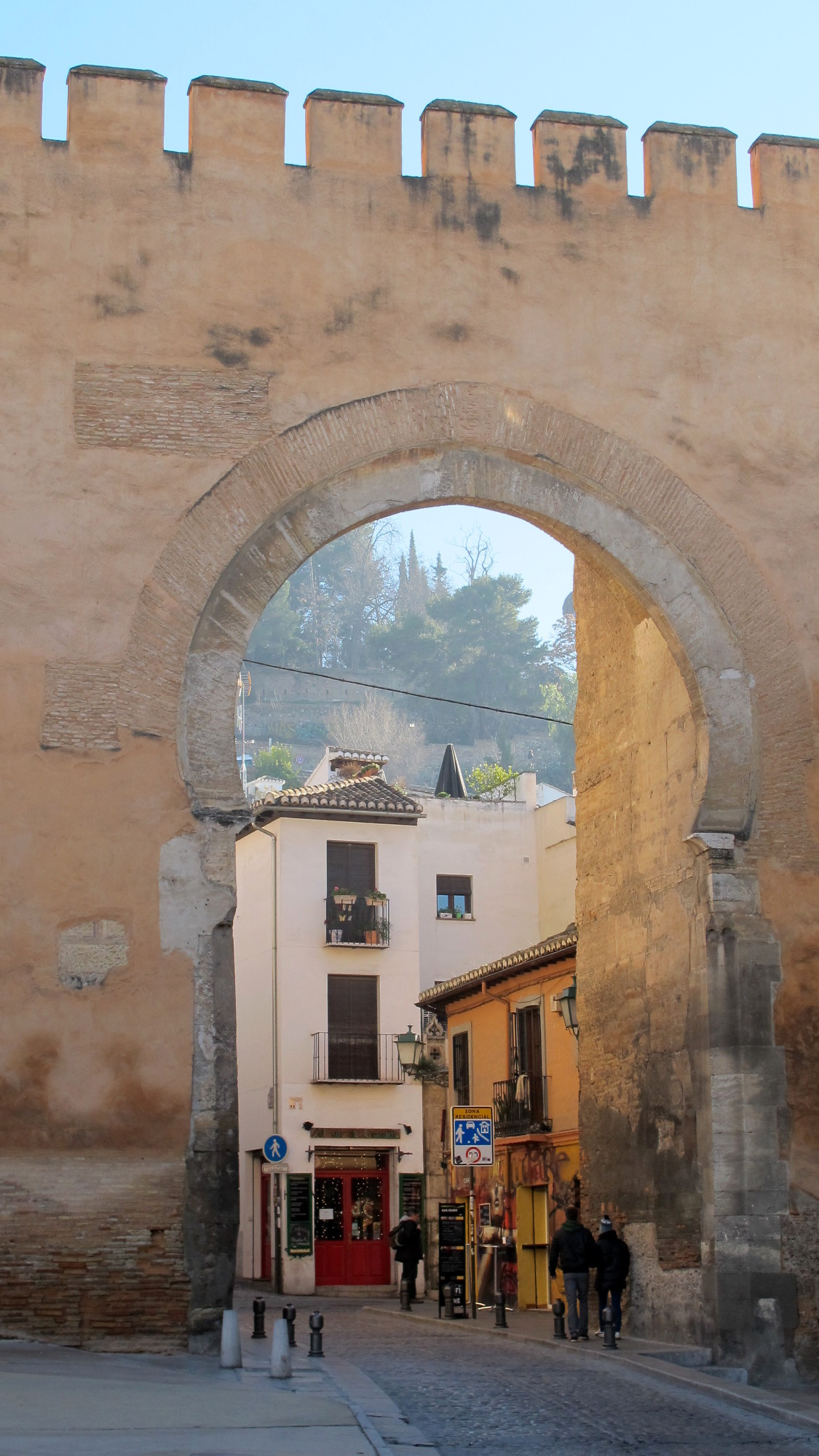
If the ancient Roman city of Elvira was located in the Albaicín district of Granada, as some think, the synod may have taken place just inside the Puerta de Elvira (eleventh-century), seen here.

The Synod of Elvira (Latin: Concilium Eliberritanum, Spanish: Concilio de Elvira) was an ecclesiastical synod held at Elvira in the Roman province of Hispania Baetica, now Granada, in southern Spain. Its date has not been exactly determined but is believed to be in the first quarter of the 4th century, approximately 305–6. It was one of three councils, together with the Synod of Arles (314) and the Synod of Ancyra, that first approached the character of general councils and prepared the way for the first ecumenical council. It was attended by nineteen bishops and twenty-six presbyters, mostly resident in Baetica. Deacons and laymen were also present. Eighty-one canons are recorded although it is believed that many were added at later dates. All concern order, discipline and conduct among the Christian community. Canon 36, forbidding the use of images in churches, became a bone of contention between Catholic and Protestant scholars after the Protestant Reformation.

It is one of a number of pre-ecumenical ancient church councils and synods. The 1913 Catholic Encyclopedia refers to it as a "council," conveying a wider scope than a synod. The Vatican refers to it using both terms.

== Place and purpose ==
The place of meeting, Eliberri, rendered as Elvira, was not far from the modern Granada, if not, as A.W. Dale and Edgar Hennecke think, actually identical with it. There the nineteen bishops and twenty-four presbyters, mostly from Hispania Baetica and Carthago Nova, (Note: Hennecke noted that Legio (Leon) and Saragoza were represented, but not Tarragona.) assembled, probably at the instigation of Hosius of Córdoba, but under the presidency of Felix of Accitum (Guadix) in Baetica, probably by virtue of his being the oldest bishop present, with a view to restoring order and discipline in the church. The canons that were adopted reflect with considerable fullness the internal life and external relations of the Spanish Church of the 4th century. The reputation of the council drew to its canons further canons that came to be associated with the Synod of Elvira.

Victor De Clercq notes "that except for Hosius of Córdoba, we know practically nothing about these men, nor do we know with certainty when and why the council was held, and that the church of Spain is one of the least known in pre-constantinian [sic] times."

== Canons ==
Maurice Meigne considers that only the first 21 canons in the list that has been transmitted were promulgated at Elvira and that the remainder were added to the collection.

The social environment of Christians in Hispania may be inferred from the canons prohibiting marriage and other intercourse with Jews, pagans and heretics; closing the offices of flamen and duumvir to Christians; and the forbidding of all contact with idolatry. and likewise participation in pagan festivals and public games. The state of morals is mirrored in the canons denouncing prevalent vices. The canons respecting the clergy exhibited the clergy as already a special class with particular privileges, as acting under a more exacting moral standard, with heavier penalties for delinquency. The bishop had acquired control of the sacraments, presbyters and deacons acting only under his orders. The episcopate appeared as a unit, with bishops being bound to respect one another's disciplinary decrees.

The canons were almost entirely concerned with the conduct of various elements of the Christian community and had no theological content as such. Sanctions included long delays before baptism and exclusion from the Eucharist for periods of months or years or indefinitely, sometimes with an exception for the deathbed, but that is also specifically excluded in some cases. Periods of penance, often for sexual offences, extended to five or ten years: "Canon 5. If a woman beats her servant and causes death within three days, she shall undergo seven years' penance if the injury was inflicted on purpose and five years' if it was accidental. She shall not receive communion during this penance unless she becomes ill. If so, she may receive communion."

All the canons that pertain to Jews served to maintain a separation between the two communities. Canon 15 prohibited marriage with pagans, and Canon 16 prohibited marriage of Christians with Jews. Canon 78 threatens Christians who commit adultery with Jews with ostracism. Canon 49 forbade the blessing of Christian crops by Jews, and Canon 50 forbade the sharing of meals by Christians and Jews.

Among the early canons, which were possibly the only original ones, Canon 1 forbade giving holy communion to lapsed Christians even in articulo mortis, an unusually severe application of Novatianist principles, which had divided the church since the recovery from mid 3rd-century persecutions: compare the severity of Cyprian of Carthage. The subject of that leading canon is a major indication for a date following a recent persecution.

Among the later canons, of especial note were Canon 33, enjoining celibacy upon all clerics, married or not, and all ministering at the altar (the most ancient canon of clerical celibacy). Also relating to the subject of clerical celibacy is Canon 27, which called for bishops and other clergy to refrain from living with women unless they were of relation. This canon is believed to be condemning the practice of Syneisaktism, or spiritual marriage, which was becoming increasingly popular among ascetic men and women.

Canon 36 stated, "It has seemed good that images should not be in churches so that what is venerated and worshiped not be painted on the walls." (Note: A possible translation is also "There shall be no pictures in the church, lest what is worshipped and adored should be depicted on the walls.") It allegedly forbids pictures in churches (compare the Iconoclastic Controversy in the East); according to Philip Schaff, the canon "has often been quoted by Protestants as an argument against image worship as idolatrous; while Roman Catholic writers explain it either as a prohibition of representations of the deity only, or as a prudential measure against heathen desecration of holy things." Canon 36 was the first official statement on art by the Christian Church and so had special interest in the history of early Christian and medieval art, even if it represented Church policy only within the limits of the synod's jurisdiction of Spain.

Canon 38 permitted lay baptism under certain conditions, and Canon 53 forbade a bishop restoring a person excommunicated by another.

Other provisions relating to images forbade Christian slaveowners from allowing their pagan slaves to keep their personal idols, or "if this is impossible to enforce, they must at least avoid the idols and remain pure. If this does not happen, they are alienated from the church" (Canon 41). Canon 60 stated, "If someone smashes an idol and is then punished by death, he or she may not be placed in the list of martyrs, since such action is not sanctioned by the Scriptures or by the apostles." Canon 34 stated, "Candles are not to be burned in a cemetery during the day. This practice is related to paganism and is harmful to Christians. Those who do this are to be denied the communion of the church." Other canons imposed "the rigorous form of fasting" every Saturday (Canon 26) and forbade the baptism of chariot racers or stage performers (Canon 62), and many tightly controlled the reception of former pagan priests into the Christian church and clergy (Canons 2, 3 4 and 55).

Several canons relate only to the behaviour of women such as Canon 67: "A woman who is baptized or is a catechumen must not associate with hairdressers or men with long hair...." Canon 81 stated, "A woman may not write to other lay Christians without her husband's consent. A woman may not receive letters of friendship addressed to her only and not to her husband as well." However, married former prostitutes were not to suffer delays in baptism on that account (Canon 44).

== Date of the synod ==
The solution of the question of the date hinges upon the interpretation of the canons: whether they were to be taken as reflecting a recent persecution or as redacted in a time of peace, either after or before the Diocletianic Persecution. Thus, the earliest investigators, Louis Duchesne and Victor De Clercq, argue for a date between 300 and 303, before the persecution under Diocletian. Others prefer a date between 303 and 314, after the persecution but before the Synod of Arles (314). A few others argue for a date between the synod of Arles and the Council of Nicaea, (325). Karl Josef von Hefele and Robert William Dale follow the early compilers of the canons Giovanni Domenico Mansi and Jean Hardouin in agreement upon 305 or 306, and Hennecke concludes that "the whole attitude points to a time of peace, not to one immediately following a persecution; the complete absence of any provisions as to the case of the lapsed is enough to preclude the modern theory as to the date."

== Documentation ==
The scanty documentation of the Synod of Elvira was first assembled by Ferdinand de Mendoza, De confirmando Concilio IIIiberitano ad Clementem VIII, 1593.

The canons are available online in English and in Latin (with dictionary lookup links)

== Bibliography ==
- Giovanni Domenico Mansi, Sacrorum Conciliorum nova et amplissima collectio (Florence and Venice, 1758–98) vol.II.ii.1-406; reprint (Paris) 1906 Reprints the account of Ferdinand de Mendoza, pp. 57–397.
- Jean Hardouin, Conciliorum collectio regia maxima i. pp. 247–258.
- Karl Josef von Hefele, Conciliengeschichte I, pp. 148–192 (2nd ed. 1873) (English translation, i. pp. 131 sqq.)
- Alfred W. Dale, The Synod of Elvira and Christian Life in the Fourth Century (London, 1882)
- Edgar Hennecke, in Schaff-Herzog Encyclopedia of Religious Knowledge (3rd ed), sv. "Elvira," especially bibliography.
- Samuel Laeuchli, Power and Sexuality: The Emergence of Canon Law at the Synod of Elvira (Philadelphia: Temple University Press) 1972. Power dynamics, sexual controls and the emergence of a clerical elite.
- Conrad Rudolph, "Communal Identity and the Earliest Christian Legislation on Art: Canon 36 of the Synod of Elvira," Perspectives for an Architecture of Solitude, ed. Terryl Kinder (2004) 1-7
- Philip Schaff History of the Christian Church, vol. II "Ante-Nicene Christianity AD 100–325" Section 55. "The Councils of Elvira, Arles, and Ancyra."
- José F. Ubina. Le concile d'Elvire et l'esprit du paganisme // Dialogues d'histoire ancienne. V. 19. No. 19-1, 1993 pp. 309–318. Available online
