= Council of Iconium =

The Council of Iconium (sometimes referred to as the Synod of Iconium) was an early Christian Council held in Iconium in the third century CE.

The exact date of the Council is uncertain, given by various authorities as 230-235, 232, 235, and “before the accession of Pope Fabian” (in 236) However Caesar Baronius attributed the Council to the year 258.

The Council was a meeting of around fifty bishops from Phrygia, Galatia, Cilicia and neighbouring provinces. Among those present was Firmilian of Caesarea.

The reason for convening the Council was to discuss the same topic as the earlier Council of Carthage, presided over by bishop Agrippinus, that is whether the baptisms carried out by priests of heretics were valid or not. The Council of Iconium agreed with the decision of Carthage that such baptisms were not valid, and the faithful needed to be baptised again. The question was raised because of the prevalence of Montanism in the region at that time, and uncertainty as to whether those joining the Orthodox Church after Montanist baptism ought to be baptised again or not.

== See also ==
- Ancient church councils (pre-ecumenical)
