= Nicetas of Nicomedia =

Nicetas was a twelfth-century Archbishop of Nicomedia. He is noted for having said that the Church of Rome "has separated herself from us by her own deeds when through pride she assumed a monarchy which does not belong to her office."

He also participated in a theological debate with Anselm of Havelberg when he was the Archbishop of Nicomedia. This took place on April 3, 1136, in the city of Constantinople, capital of the East Roman Empire (referred to sometimes as the Byzantine Empire).
