= Synod of Ancyra =

Ecclesiastical council convened in modern-day Ankara in 314

The Synod of Ancyra was an ecclesiastical council, or synod, convened in Ancyra, the seat of the Roman administration for the province of Galatia, in 314. Together with the synods of Neocaesarea, Antioch, Gangra and Laodicea, the canons of the council formed the nucleus of nearly all future collections of church law.

== Setting ==
The season was soon after Easter; the year may be safely deduced from the fact that the first nine canons are intended to repair havoc wreaked in the church by persecution, which ceased after the overthrow of Maximinus II in 313. Three lists of bishops who attended have been preserved, varying between 12 and 18 participating bishops. Though the lists might have been amended later, most participants can be dated to the period and were present at the council of Nicaea. Either Vitalis, Bishop of Antioch, or Marcellus of Ancyra, bishop of Ancyra, presided, and possibly both were present, although the Libellus Synodicus, also known as the Synodicon Vetus, assigns to the latter.

== Decrees ==
The synod issued 25 canons, with the oldest preserved version of the Greek text dating to the ninth or tenth century. The first nine canons of the council dealt with the readmission of clergy and laity who had lapsed during the persecutions. Depending on the clerical rank and circumstances of this apostasy, different penances were prescribed.

The remaining fifteen canons dealt with issues of ecclesiastic discipline and jurisdiction, asceticism and violence arising from clerical appointments.

The tenth canon tolerates the marriages of deacons who previous to ordination had reserved the right to take a wife. The thirteenth forbids chorepiscopi to ordain presbyters or deacons.

The sixteenth canon brackets the Christians who have committed bestiality, or may still have been doing so, into several different groups based on the offender's age, and assigns different penances to each group; married men over 20 were sanctioned more harshly than unmarried youths, and married men over 50 received the harshest sanctions.

The seventeenth canon condemns the Christians who have either committed bestiality or had sexual intercourse with a leprous woman, while themselves being leprous, to having to pray with the wintering people - i.e. outside church buildings. The equation of leprous women with beasts is generally considered difficult to interpret.

The eighteenth safeguards the right of the people in objecting to the appointment of a bishop whom they do not wish.

Canon twenty-two concerns itself with wilful murderers, proscribing them to remain prostrators but allows them at the end of life to be indulged with full communion. Canon twenty-four imposes five years of penance upon those who consult magicians.

The Council also condemned both abortion and infanticide, though it only suggested a ten year excommunication compared to the lifelong excommunication imposed by the council of Elvira.

== Legacy ==
The canons resulting from the synod have a particular importance for the history of the institution of penance and are among the earliest evidence for the three-step system of penance, which later became the four-step system. Further, canon 13 contains the first evidence for chorepiscopi.

== Bibliography ==
- Ohme, Heinz (27 February 2012). "Sources of the Greek Canon Law to the Quinisext Council (691/692)". In Hartmann, Wilfried; Pennington, Kenneth (eds.). The History of Byzantine and Eastern Canon Law to 1500. CUA Press. ISBN 978-0-8132-1679-9.
