= Synod of Neocaesarea =

The Synod of Neo-Caesarea was a church synod held in Neocaesarea, Pontus, shortly after the Synod of Ancyra, probably about 314 or 315 (although Hefele inclines to put it somewhat later).

Its principal work was the adoption of fifteen disciplinary canons, which were subsequently accepted as ecumenical by the Council of Chalcedon, 451, and of which the most important are the following:

i. degrading priests who marry after ordination
vii. forbidding a priest to be present at the second marriage of any one
viii. refusing ordination to the husband of an adulteress (and if she commit adultery after his ordination, he must put her away)
xi. fixing thirty years as the age below which one might not be ordained (because Christ began His public ministry at the age of thirty)
xiii. affording to city priests the precedence over country priests
xiv. permitting Chorepiscopi to celebrate the sacraments
xv. requiring that there be seven deacons in every city.

== See also ==
- Ancient church councils (pre-ecumenical)
