= Synods of Antioch =

Councils convened between 264 and 269

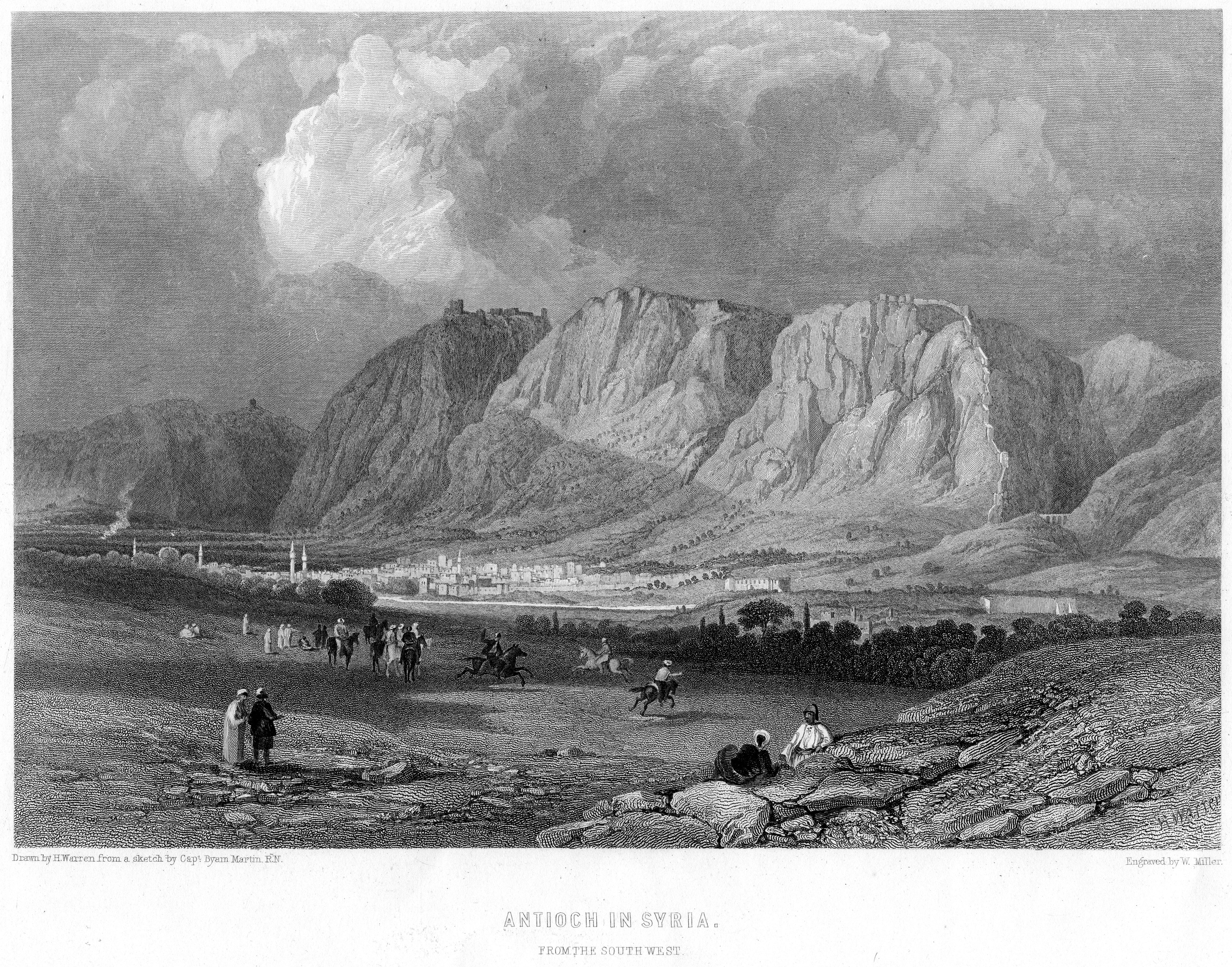
Artistic depiction of Antioch in Syria

Beginning with three synods convened between 264 and 269 in the matter of Paul of Samosata, more than thirty councils were held in Antioch in ancient times. Most of these dealt with phases of the Arian and of the Christological controversies. For example, the Catholic Encyclopedia article on Paul of Samosata states:

It must be regarded as certain that the council which condemned Paul rejected the term homoousios; but naturally only in a false sense used by Paul; not, it seems because he meant by it a unity of Hypostasis in the Trinity (so St. Hilary), but because he intended by it a common substance out of which both Father and Son proceeded, or which it divided between them, — so St. Basil and St. Athanasius; but the question is not clear. The objectors to the Nicene doctrine in the fourth century made copious use of this disapproval of the Nicene word by a famous council.

The most celebrated convened in the summer of 341 at the dedication of the Domus Aurea, and is therefore called in encaeniis or dedication council. Nearly a hundred Eastern bishops were present, but the bishop of Rome was not represented. The emperor Constantius II attended in person.

== The Synods of Antioch in 264–269 ==
The first Synod of Antioch, which took place between 264 and 269, was one of the early significant ecclesiastical councils in the Christian Church. This synod was primarily convened to address the teachings of Paul of Samosata, who was the Bishop of Antioch.

Paul of Samosata had introduced a doctrine that was considered heretical by the mainstream Church, particularly concerning the nature of Christ and the Holy Trinity. His teachings were seen as a form of monarchianism, which emphasized the indivisibility of God at the expense of the distinct persons of the Trinity.

The synod ultimately condemned Paul's teachings and deposed him from his position as Bishop. It is also noted that the council rejected the term homoousios—meaning "of the same substance"—but this was in the specific context of Paul’s usage, which implied a division of substance between the Father and the Son, rather than the orthodox interpretation of the Trinity as three distinct persons of one substance.

This synod was significant as it set a precedent for the Church’s handling of heresy and laid the groundwork for future ecumenical councils, which would further define Christian doctrine, such as the First Council of Nicaea in 325.

== The Synod of Antioch in 341 ==
The council approved three creeds. Anglican theologian Richard Hanson wrote: "[The] Second Creed of Antioch, often known both in the ancient and the modern world as the 'Dedication' Creed, was the Council's most important result." Its "chief bête noire [the thing that it particularly dislikes] is Sabellianism, the denial of a distinction between the three within the Godhead."

=== Canons ===
The twenty-five canons adopted regulate the so-called metropolitan constitution of the church. Ecclesiastical power is vested chiefly in the metropolitan (later called archbishop), and the biannual provincial synod (see Nicaea I, canon 5), which he summons and over which he presides. Consequently, the powers of country bishops (chorepiscopi) are curtailed, and direct recourse to the emperor is forbidden. The sentence of one judicatory is to be respected by other judicatories of equal rank; re-trial may take place only before that authority to whom appeal regularly lies. Without due invitation, a bishop may not ordain, or in any other way interfere with affairs lying outside his proper territory; nor may he appoint his own successor. Penalties are set on the refusal to celebrate Easter in accordance with the Nicaea I decree, as well as on leaving a church before the service of the Eucharist is completed.

The numerous objections made by scholars in past centuries about the canons ascribed to this council have been elaborately stated and probably refuted by Hefele. The canons formed part of the Codex canonum used at Chalcedon in 451 and are found in later Eastern and Western collections of canons.

== See also ==
- SS Pelagia and Nonnus, two legendary Syrian saints who supposedly met during one of the synods at Antioch
- Ancient church councils (pre-ecumenical)

== Notes ==
- The canons of the Synod in 341 are printed in Greek, and translated. The four dogmatic formulas are given by G. Ludwig Hahn.
