= Glossary of the Catholic Church =

This is a glossary of terms used within the Catholic Church. Some terms used in everyday English have a different meaning in the context of the Catholic faith, including brother, confession, confirmation, exemption, faithful, father, ordinary, religious, sister, venerable, and vow.

== A ==
- Abbess – the female head of a community of nuns (abbey)
- Abbot – the male head of a community of monks (monastery)
- Acolyte
- Actual grace
- Ad limina visits – visit by diocesan bishop to the Holy See, usually every five years
- Alexandrian Rite
- Altar
- Altar server
- Altarage – the revenue reserved for the chaplain (altarist or altar-thane) in contradistinction to the income of the parish priest, it came to signify the fees received by a priest from the laity when discharging any function for them
- Ambo
- Ambry
- Amovibility
- Annulment – see: Declaration of Nullity (below)
- Apostolic administrator
- Apostolic Chancery – a former office of the Roman Curia
- Apostolic life, Society of – see: Society of apostolic life (below)
- Apostolic nuncio – see: Nuncio (below)
- Apostolic prefect
- Apostolic succession
- Apostolic vicar
- Apse
- Archbishop – the bishop of an archdiocese, with limited jurisdiction over his suffragan sees; a titular and largely honorary designation granted to certain bishops, often Nuncios and other members of the Holy See diplomatic corps
- Archpriest (Latin Church) – see: Vicar Forane (below)
- Auxiliary bishop

== B ==
- Baptism
- Baptism of Jesus
- Baptismal font
- Beatification
- Bishop – an ordained minister who holds the fullness of the sacrament of Holy Orders and is responsible for teaching the Catholic faith, ruling the Church, and sanctifying her people
- Bishop emeritus (or Archbishop emeritus) – the title given to a retired bishop or archbishop
- Bishops' conference – see: Episcopal conference (below)
- Blessed (beatified person) – see: Beatification (above)
- Brother – a male lay member of a Catholic religious institute
- Byzantine Rite

== C ==
- Canon law
- Cardinal
- Cardinal Vicar
- Catholicism – the body of the Catholic faith, its theologies and doctrines, its liturgical, ethical, spiritual, and behavioural characteristics, as well as a religious people as a whole
- Catechism – a document containing an approved exposition of Church teachings
- Chancery, Apostolic – see: Apostolic Chancery (above)
- Chancery, Diocesan – see: Diocesan chancery (below)
- Chaplain of His Holiness
- Clergy, Regular – see: Regular clergy (below)
- Clergy, Secular – see: Secular clergy (below)
- Coadjutor bishop – an auxiliary bishop with the legal right of succession to the see of which he is coadjutor
- Code of Canon Law, 1917
- Code of Canon Law, 1983
- Code of Canons of the Eastern Churches
- College of Cardinals
- College of Consultors
- Communion – see: Eucharist (below) and Full communion (below)
- Communion rite
- Communion of Saints
- Conclave
- Confession – see: Sacrament of Penance (below)
- Confirmation
- Congregation, Religious
- Congregation (Roman Curia)
- Congregation, Sacred – see: Congregation (Roman Curia) (above)
- Consecrated life
- Consecrated life (Catholic Church)
- Consecrated life, Institute of – see: Institute of consecrated life (below)
- Corpus Juris Canonici
- Council, Pontifical – see: Pontifical Council (below)
- Counter-Reformation – the period of Catholic revival beginning with the Council of Trent and ending at the close of the Thirty Years' War
- Credence table
- Crosier
- Crucifix
- Curia, Moderator of the – see: Moderator of the Curia (below)
- Curia
- Curia, Roman – see: Roman Curia (below)

== D ==
- Deacon
- Dean – see: Vicar forane (below)
- Declaration of Nullity – a canonical judicial sentence declaring that the matrimonial covenant was invalid from the beginning due to impediments or defect of consent
- Definitor
- Diaconate – see: Deacon (above)
- Dicastery
- Diocesan administrator
- Diocesan bishop
- Diocesan chancery
- Diocesan curia – see: "Curia (Roman Catholic Church)" (above)
- Divine Liturgy
- Diocesan priest
- Diocesan tribunal – see: Tribunal (below)
- Discalceation
- Dulia – see also: Hyperdulia (below)

== E ==
- East–West Schism – forcibly divided medieval Christianity's Eastern (Greek) from its Western (Latin) jurisdiction, which later became known as the Eastern Orthodox Church and the Roman Catholic Church, respectively
- Eastern Catholic Churches
- East Syriac Rite
- Ecclesiastical judge
- Eminence – see: His Eminence (below)
- Encyclical
- Eparchy
- Episcopal conference
- Episcopal see
- Episcopal vicar
- Eucharist – a Christian sacrament, generally considered to be a commemoration of the Last Supper, in which Jesus Christ shared his Body and Blood with his disciples before his betrayal and crucifixion
- Exarch
- Excardination – see also: Incardination
- Excitator – the excitator in seminaries, monasteries and convents was the person charged with the job of awakening community members each morning
- Exclaustration
- Excommunication – a medicinal religious penalty that bars the person from reception of the sacraments, the rights of office, and other privileges in the Church
- Exemption
- Exorcism – the practice of expelling demons from a person, place, or thing which they are believed to possess or inhabit

== F ==
- Faithful – the collective members of the church incorporated into it through sacramental baptism
- Fall of Man – the willful transition of the first humans from a state of original holiness, in communion with God, to a state of guilt and perennial disobedience
- Family wage
- Father (cleric) – a traditional title of priests
- Father, God the – a name for the First Person of the Blessed Trinity
- Five Ways – see: Quinque Viæ (below)
- Font, Baptismal – see: Baptismal font (above)
- Font, Holy water – see: Holy water font (below)
- Friar
- Full communion

== G ==
- Grace (prayer)

== H ==
- Hierarchy
- His Eminence
- His Holiness
- Holy Communion – see: Eucharist (above)
- Holy Orders
- Holy See – the episcopal jurisdiction of the Bishop of Rome (who is commonly known as the Pope), and is the preeminent episcopal see of the Catholic Church, forming the central government of the Church
- Holy water font (or stoup) (church)
- Holy water stoup (home) – see: Home stoup (below)
- Home stoup
- Honorary Prelate
- Horarium – the schedule of daily prayers for those living in a religious community or seminary See also Liturgy of the Hours
- Hyperdulia – veneration of the Blessed Virgin Mary see also: dulia
- Hypostasis – in Jesus Christ, the union of two natures, divine and human, in the one divine person of the Son of God

== I ==
- Immaculate Conception – the dogma that Mary was conceived without original sin (not to be confused with the Incarnation of Christ)
- Incardination – see also: excardination (above)
- Incarnation – the Word of God taking on a human nature and becoming true man, Jesus Christ (not to be confused with the Immaculate Conception of Mary)
- Institute of consecrated life
- Institute, Religious – see: Religious institute (below)
- Institute, Secular – see: Secular institute (below)

== J ==
- Judicial vicar
- Just War doctrine

== L ==
- Laity
- Lapsed Catholic – a Catholic who has ceased practising the Catholic faith
- Latin Church
- Latin liturgical rites
- Law, canon – see: Canon law (above)
- Lay communion – the status of a cleric who is in communion with the Church, but only with the standing of a lay person
- Lay ecclesial ministry
- Lectio Divina
- Lectionary
- Lector – see: Reader (below)
- Limbo – an idea of speculative theology about the afterlife condition of those unbaptized who die in Original Sin rather than assigning them to the Hell of the damned. Limbo is not a formally defined doctrine of the Catholic Church
- Latria – worship and prayer owed to God alone
- Liturgy – public worship
- Local ordinary

== M ==
- Mass – the usual English-language name for the Eucharistic celebration in the Latin liturgical rites of the Catholic Church
- Mariology – the theology concerned with the Virgin Mary, the mother of Jesus Christ
- Mediatrix – the role of the Blessed Virgin Mary as a mediator in the salvation process
- Metropolitan archbishop
- Military ordinariate
- Missal
- Missal, Roman – see: Roman Missal (below)
- Mission sui juris
- Mitre
- Monk
- Monsignor
- Most Holy Trinity – see:Trinity (below)

== N ==
- Narthex
- Nave
- Novitiate
- Nun – see also: Sister (below)
- Nuncio

== O ==
- Officialis – see: Judicial vicar (above)
- Order, Religious – see: Religious order (below)
- Ordinariate, Military – see: Military ordinariate (above)
- Ordinariate, Personal – see: Personal ordinariate (below)
- Ordinary – see: Local ordinary (above)

== P ==
- Papal court
- Parish
- Parishioner – churchgoer
- Pastor
- Patriarch
- Patriarchate
- Penance – see: Sacrament of Penance (below)
- Permanent deacon – see: Deacon (above)
- Personal ordinariate
- Personal prelature
- Pew
- Pontiff
- Pontifical Council
- Pope
- Prefect apostolic – see: Apostolic prefect (above)
- Prelate
- Prelate, Honorary – see: Honorary Prelate (above)
- Prelature, Personal – see: Personal prelature (above)
- Prelature, Territorial – see: Territorial prelature (below)
- Priest
- Priest, Diocesan – see: Diocesan priest (above)
- Priest, Religious – see: Regular clergy (below)
- Prior
- Prioress
- Protonotary apostolic
- Pulpit – see: Ambo (above)

== Q ==
- Quinque Viæ – Aquinas' famous philosophical proofs for the existence of God found in his Summa Theologiæ

== R ==
- Ratum sed non consummatum
- Reader
- Reconciliation – see: Sacrament of Penance (below)
- Rector (cathedral or seminary)
- Regular clergy
- Religious
- Religious brother – see: Brother (above)
- Religious congregation – see: Congregation, Religious (above)
- Religious institute (Catholic)
- Religious order
- Religious priest – see: Regular clergy (above)
- Rite to Being – the rite of being left alone to pray to Jesus Christ
- Religious sister – see: Sister (below)
- Right of Option – a way of obtaining a benefice or a title, by the choice of the new titulary
- Roman Catholic – the Roman rite of the Catholic Church
- Roman Curia – "the complex of dicasteries and institutes that help the Roman Pontiff in the exercise of his supreme pastoral function for the good and service of the whole Church and of the particular Churches"
- Roman Missal

== S ==
- Sacrament of Penance – commonly called Confession, Reconciliation or Penance, becoming free of sin by confession and repentance
- Sacred congregation – see: Congregation (Roman Curia) (above)
- Sacred Tradition
- Saints, Communion of – see: Communion of Saints (above)
- Sanctifying grace – see: Grace (Christianity) (above)
- Sanctuary
- Secular clergy
- Secular institute
- Sede vacante
- See, Episcopal – see: Episcopal see (above)
- Seminarian
- Server – see: Altar server (above)
- Side altar
- Simple vow – any vow which is not a solemn vow
- Sister
- Society of apostolic life
- Solemn vow
- Stoup, Holy water – see: Holy water font (above) and Home stoup (above)
- Summa Theologiæ – a theological work by Thomas Aquinas
- Supreme Pontiff – see: Pontiff (above)

== T ==
- Territorial prelature
- Titular bishop
- Titular church
- Tradition, Sacred – see: Sacred Tradition (above)
- Transept
- Transitional deaconsee: Deacon (above)
- Transubstantiation
- Tribunal – an ecclesiastical court
- Trinity, The

== U ==
- Universal Church – title that refers to the Catholic Church. From Greek 'katholikos 'universal' from kata 'in respect of' + holos 'whole'

== V ==
- Vacant see – see: Sede vacante (above)
- Vatican
- Venerable
- Vicar apostolic – see: Apostolic vicar (above)
- Vicar forane – also known as "dean" or, in the Latin Church, "archpriest"
- Vicar general
- Vicar, judicial – see: Judicial vicar (above)
- Vicar of Christ
- Vow – see: Simple vow (above) or Solemn vow (above)

== W ==
- Wage, Family – see: Family wage (above)
- War, just – see: Just war (above)
- Ways, Five – see: Quinque Viæ(above)
- West Syriac Rite

== See also ==
- Catholic Encyclopedia
