= Priesthood in the Catholic Church =

Catholic holy order

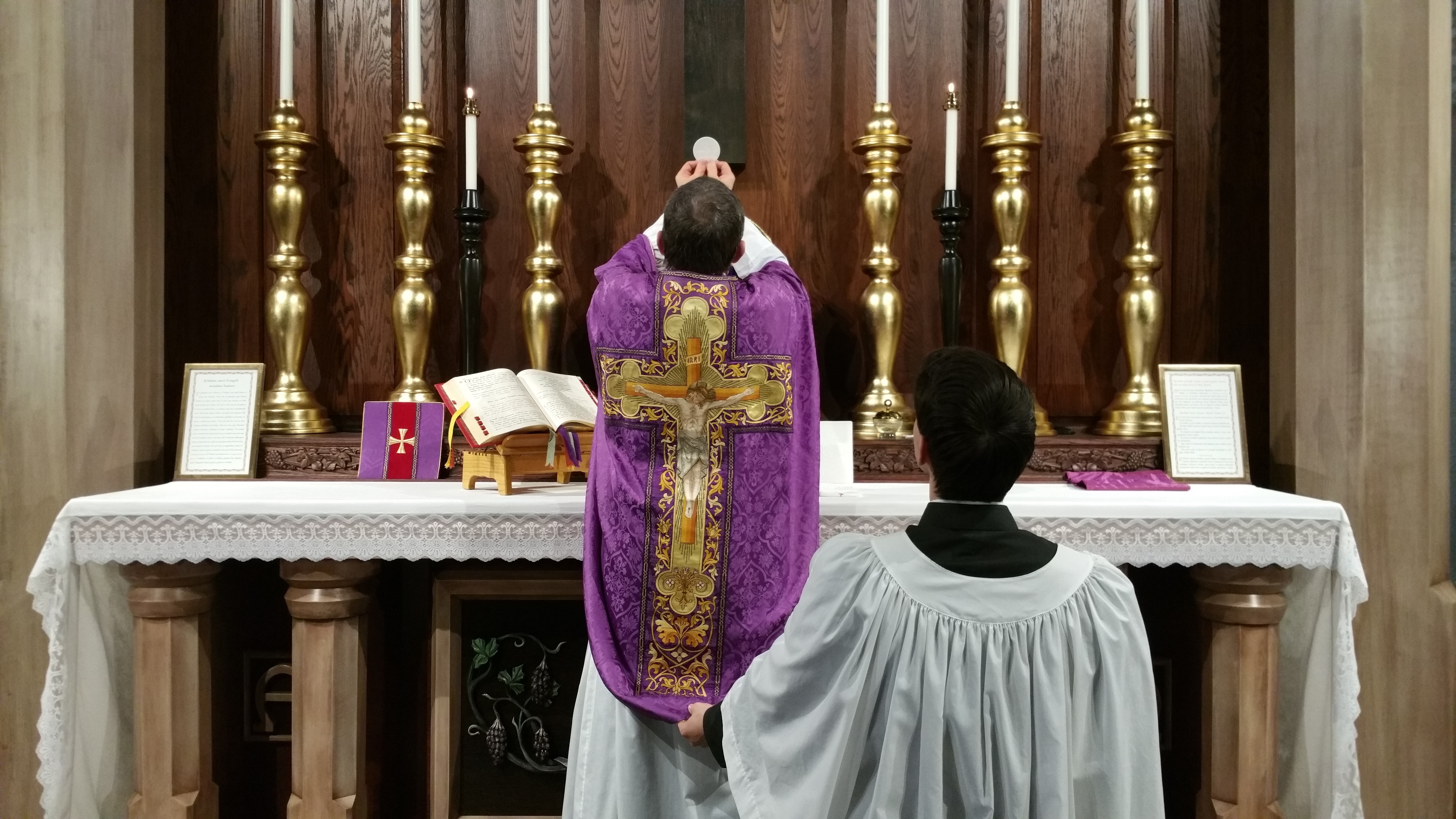
A priest celebrating the Traditional Latin Mass

The priesthood is the office of the ministers of religion, who have been commissioned ("ordained") with the holy orders of the Catholic Church. Technically, bishops are a priestly order as well; however, in common English usage priest refers only to presbyters and pastors (parish priests). The church's doctrine also sometimes refers to all baptised members (inclusive of the laity) as the "common priesthood", which should not be confused with the ministerial priesthood of the ordained clergy.

The church has different rules for priests in the Latin Church — the largest Catholic particular church — and in the 23 Eastern Catholic Churches. Notably, priests in the Latin Church must take a vow of celibacy, whereas most Eastern Catholic Churches permit married men to be ordained. Deacons are male and usually belong to the diocesan clergy, but, unlike almost all Latin Church (Western Catholic) priests and all bishops from Eastern or Western Catholicism, they may marry as laymen before their ordination as clergy. The priesthood is a vocation for men only. The Catholic Church teaches that when a man participates in priesthood after the Sacrament of Holy Orders, he acts in persona Christi Capitis, representing the person of Christ.

In Latin, the words sacerdos and sacerdotium are used to refer in general to the ministerial priesthood shared by bishops and presbyters, while the words presbyter, presbyterium and presbyteratus refer to presbyters, or "priests" in the usual English use of the word.

Catholics living a consecrated life include both the ordained and unordained. Members of the institutes of consecrated life can be deacons, priests, bishops, or non-ordained members. The non-ordained in these institutes are not to be considered laypersons in a strict sense—they take certain vows and are not free to marry once they have made solemn vows. The male members of religious orders, whether living in apostolic communities or in enclosed orders, and who are ordained priests or deacons constitute what is called the religious or regular clergy, distinct from the diocesan or secular clergy. Those ordained priests or deacons who are not members of some sort of religious order (secular priests) most often serve as clergy to a specific church or in an office of a specific diocese or in Rome. The term "Father" (contracted to Fr, in the Catholic and some other churches) in often used regarding priests.

== History ==
Catholic tradition says the twelve apostles of the New Testament selected other men to succeed them as the bishops (episkopoi, Greek for "overseers") of the first Christian communities, with whom were associated presbyters (presbyteroi, Greek for "elders") and deacons (diakonoi, Greek for "servants"). As communities multiplied and grew in size, the bishops appointed more and more presbyters to preside at the Eucharist in place of the bishop in the multiple communities in each region. The diaconate evolved as the liturgical assistants of the bishop and his delegate for the administration of church funds and programmes for the poor. Today, the rank of "presbyter" is typically what one thinks of as a priest, although church catechism considers both bishops and presbyters as "priests".

Some Protestant critics have challenged the historical accuracy of the claim of unbroken succession.

The churches which recognise the three first Holy Synods shared the tradition of the sacrament of ordination by which the grace of apostolic succession was secured; these include the Church of the East (split from the Catholic Church in 424), the Oriental Orthodoxy (split in 451) and the Eastern Orthodox Church (split with the East–West Schism of 1054).

During the Protestant Reformation, Martin Luther and William Tyndale advocated the priesthood of all believers, the idea that all baptized Christians are equally part of the sacred priesthood and that ministerial priesthood has no real authority beyond that of the congregation. This was a complex and controversial matter, contributing to further schisms within the Reformation movement of the Church. The Lutheran-Evangelical Swedish Church maintains the sacrament of ordination and the doctrine of Apostolic Succession, as does the Anglican Church. The doctrine is interpreted in various ways by different Protestant denominations, with some dropping apostolic succession and holy orders as a sacrament, as per example the Church of Norway and Denmark who keep their respective Monarchs as Pontiffs, sovereign heads of the church-hierarchy. There are different requirements for the performance of the Eucharistic ceremony to be valid among different kinds of Christian denominations, in regard of who are to oversee the sanctity of the Eucharist and stand as guarantor that the Holy Service is properly performed. There are significant differences particularly concerning the strictness/liberality of who is welcome to receive the sacraments.

Through the principle of church economy, the Catholic Church recognises as valid the Holy Service of denominations practicing the Nicene Creed (Symbolum Nicaenum), and deems illicit and therefore find the ordination of priests "objectively sacrilegious" in denominations separated from the one, holy, apostolic and catholic (i.e. universal) Church, which holds an unbroken apostolic succession. Alongside the Eastern Catholic Churches, it shares and defines the so-called first seven ecumenical councils. The Eastern Catholic Churches or Oriental Catholic Churches, also called the Eastern-rite Catholic Churches, Eastern Rite Catholicism, or simply the Eastern Churches are 23 Eastern Christian sui iuris (autonomous) particular churches of the Catholic Church, in full communion with the Bishop of Rome. Although they are distinct theologically, liturgically, and historically from the Latin Church, they are all in full communion with it and with each other. The Coptic Catholic Church among these 23 is not identical with the Coptic Orthodox Patriarchate of Alexandria. The Old Catholic church broke communion with the Roman Catholic Church in the 1870s and are thus schismatic. Furthermore, in 2008, the Old Catholics of the Union of Scranton broke away from the Union of Utrecht after the Union of Utrecht began ordaining women and blessing same-sex unions. Since then, the Union of Scranton has expanded to include the Nordic Catholic Church (NCC) which separated from the Church of Norway under sovereignty of the King of Norway, in opposition to similar practices, and has developed a more Catholic theology. The Nordic Catholic Church includes the Christ-Catholic Church of Germany as a daughter-church, which traces its history through the Old Catholics of the Union of Utrecht and the Polish-Catholic Church of the Republic of Poland. The Holy Apostolic Catholic Assyrian Congregation of the East holds apostolic succession, but is not in communion with either the Oriental Orthodox Congregation in full communion with the Roman or the Eastern Orthodox Church. In contrast to the Evangelical-Lutheran religion of Denmark and Norway, the Church of Sweden practices Apostolic Succession, and holds Ordination as a sacrament. Recognition of the ordination of Anglican Church priests was denied in 1896 by Pope Leo XIII through the papal bull Apostolicae curae over a dispute in the wording of the Anglican ceremony starting in the 1500s.

In 1965, the Second Vatican Council published Presbyterorum ordinis, a decree on the ministry and life of priests, and Optatam Totius on the training of priests. Presbyterorum ordinis observes that "priests, while engaging in prayer and adoration, or preaching the word, or offering the Eucharistic Sacrifice and administering the other sacraments, or performing other works of the ministry for men, devote all [their] energy to the increase of the glory of God and to man's progress in the divine life".

Since 1970, the number of Catholic priests in the world has decreased by about 5,000, to 414,313 priests as of 2012, but the worldwide Catholic population has nearly doubled, growing from 653.6 million in 1970 to 1.229 billion in 2012. This has resulted in a worldwide shortage of Catholic priests. In 2014, 49,153 Catholic parishes had no resident priest pastor. The number of priests is increasing in Africa and Asia, but not keeping pace with growth in Catholic populations there, and the number of priests is falling in Europe and the Americas faster than the number of local Catholics is declining. This has resulted in some African and Asian priests being recruited to European and American churches, reversing the historical practice of Catholic missionaries being sent from Western countries to the rest of the world.

Only men are allowed to receive holy orders, and the church does not allow any transgender people to do so.

In the 1990s and 2000s, the cases of sexual abuse by Catholic priests gained worldwide attention, with thousands of accused priests and tens of thousands of alleged victims. The church estimated that over the 50 years ending in 2009, between 1.5% and 5% of Catholic priests had a sexual encounter with a minor, and Thomas Plante estimated a figure of 4%. Public anger was fueled by the revelation that many accused priests were transferred to another parish rather than being removed from ministry or reported to police. The scandal caused some Catholics to leave the church, made recruitment of new priests more difficult, and resulted in billions of dollars in lawsuit settlements and bankruptcies that increased financial pressure to close parishes with declining membership. In February 2019, Pope Francis acknowledged the clerical abuse of nuns, including sexual slavery.

== Theology of the priesthood ==
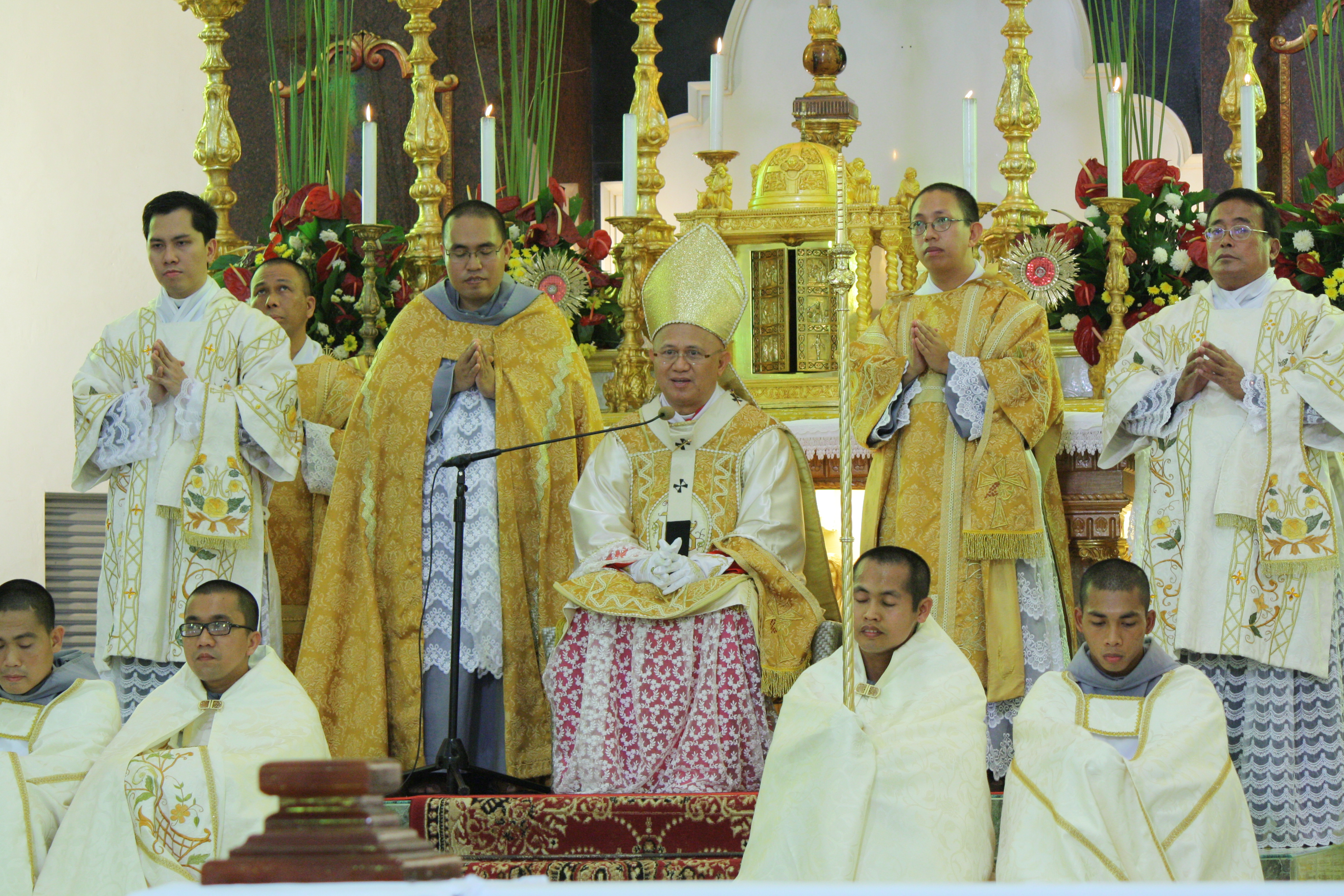
An array of ordained Catholic ministers shown in their distinct priestly ranks, bishop (central figure), priests, and deacons

Catholic priests are ordained by bishops through the sacrament of holy orders. Catholic bishops are ordained in an unbroken line of apostolic succession back to the Twelve Apostles depicted in the Catholic Bible. The ceremony of Eucharist, which can only be confected by priests, in particular derives from the story of the Last Supper, when Jesus Christ distributed bread and wine in the presence of the Twelve Apostles, in some versions of the Gospel of Luke commanding them to "do this in memory of me".

=== Passover and Christ ===
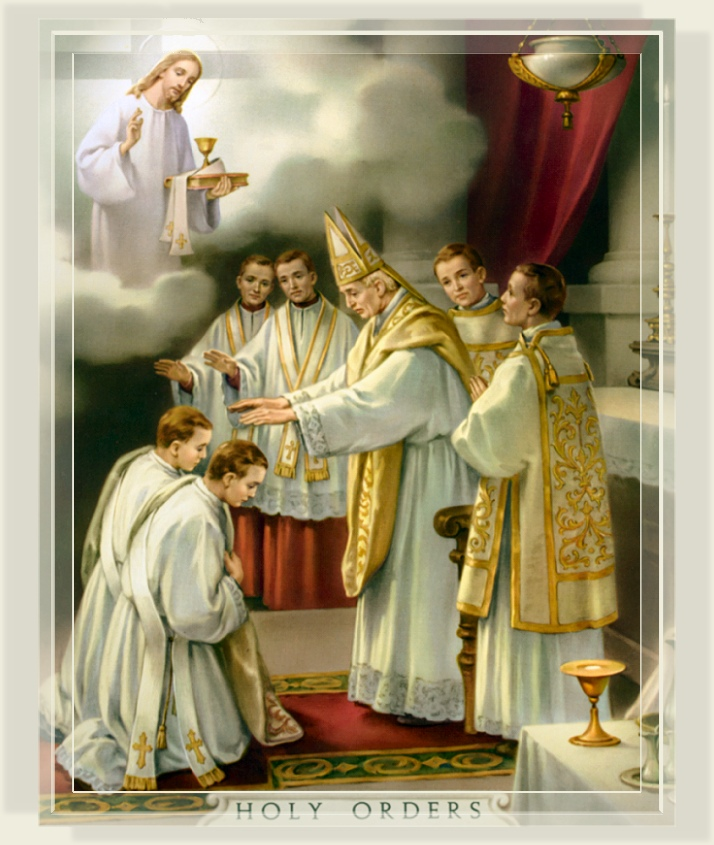
Ordination to the priesthood (Latin Church); devotional card, 1925

The theology of the Catholic priesthood is rooted in the priesthood of Christ and to some degree shares elements of the ancient Hebraic priesthood as well, since the Catholic priesthood is considered the fulfillment of the priesthood of the Old Covenant. A priest is one who presides over a sacrifice and offers that sacrifice and prayers to God on behalf of believers. Jewish priesthood which functioned at the temple in Jerusalem offered animal sacrifices at various times throughout the year for a variety of reasons.

In Christian theology, Jesus is the Lamb provided by God himself as the sacrifice for the sins of the world. Before his death on the cross, Jesus celebrated the Passover with his disciples (the Last Supper) and offered blessings over the bread and wine respectively, saying: "Take and eat. This is my body" and "Drink from this all of you, for this is my blood, the blood of the covenant, poured out for the forgiveness of sins." (Matthew 26:26–28: Jerusalem Bible). The next day Christ's body and blood were visibly sacrificed on the cross.

Catholics believe that it is this same body, sacrificed on the cross and risen on the third day and united with Christ's divinity, soul and blood which is made present in the offering of each Eucharistic sacrifice which is called the Eucharist. The Catholic Church teaches the doctrine of transubstantiation, which states that the substances, or underlying reality, of the bread and wine is supernaturally changed by the Words of Consecration of the priest in the ritual of the Mass. At the same time, the accidents (that is, the outward appearances and attributes) remain that of bread and wine: i.e. under normal circumstances, scientific analysis of the Eucharistic elements would indicate the physical-material properties of wine and bread.

Thus Catholic priests, in celebrating the Eucharist, join each offering of the Eucharistic elements in union with the sacrifice of Christ. Through their celebration of the Holy Eucharist, they make present the one eternal sacrifice of Christ on the cross.

The Catholic Church teaches that the Sacrifice of the Mass and the sacrifice of Christ on the Cross are one and the same sacrifice (as decrees in the Council of Trent affirmed); "The sacrifice of Christ and the sacrifice of the Eucharist are one single sacrifice," whereas the Jewish concept of memorial states "... the memorial is not merely a recollection of past events....these events become in a certain way present and real" and thus "...the sacrifice Christ offered once and for all on the cross remains ever present." Properly speaking, in Catholic theology, as expressed by Saint Thomas Aquinas, "Only Christ is the true priest, the others being only his ministers." Thus, Catholic clergy share in the one, unique, Priesthood of Christ as his instruments.

== Education and formation ==
The canon law of the Catholic Church holds that the priesthood is a sacred and perpetual vocational state, not just a profession (which is a reason for, and symbolized by, the state of celibacy). There are programs of formation and study which aim to enable the future priest to effectively serve his ministry. These programs are demanded by canon law (in the Latin Church, canons 232–264) which also refers to the Bishops' Conferences for local more detailed regulation. As a general rule, education is extensive and lasts at least five or six years, depending on the national Programme of Priestly Formation.

The programme for formation includes not only academic in philosophy and theology, but also human, social, spiritual and pastoral formation. The purpose of seminary education is ultimately to prepare men to be pastors of souls. In the end, however, each individual Ordinary (such as a bishop or Superior General) is responsible for the official call to priesthood, and only a bishop may ordain. Any ordinations done before the normally scheduled time (before study completion) must have the explicit approval of the bishop.

Canon law provides for a minimum age at ordination. This is 25 in the Code of Canon Law, although the Second Vatican Council's Decree on Priestly Training also allowed bishops to adopt their own rulings increasing this age.

The Council's Decree on the Catholic Churches of the Eastern Rite observed that priestly formation throughout the whole church should ensure that seminarians are "instructed in the rites and especially in the practical norms that must be applied" in relation to the various rites of the church working together.

=== Regional information ===
- In the United States, priests must have undergraduate-level instruction in philosophy plus an additional four to five years of graduate-level seminary formation in theology. A Master of Divinity is the most common degree. A preparatory (propaedeutic) year is now being added by many dioceses in the U.S. This spiritual year prepares aspirants for their later philosophical and theological studies.
- In Scotland, there is a mandatory year of preparation before entering seminary for a year dedicated to spiritual formation, followed by several years of study.
- In Europe, Australasia and North America, seminarians usually graduate with a Master of Divinity or a Master of Theology degree, which is a four-year professional degree (as opposed to a Master of Arts which is an academic degree). At least four years are to be in theological studies at the major seminary.
- In Germany and Austria, priest candidates graduate with an academic degree (Magister theologiae, Diplom-Theologe, Master of Arts in Theology). The degree takes five years and is preceded by a year of spiritual formation (plus learning of the ancient languages) and followed by two years of pastoral practice (during which the candidate is ordained to the diaconate). Usually, priests spend all of that time in a seminary except one "free year".
- In Africa, Asia and South America, programmes are more flexible, being developed according to the age and academic abilities of those preparing for ordination.

== Rite of Ordination ==
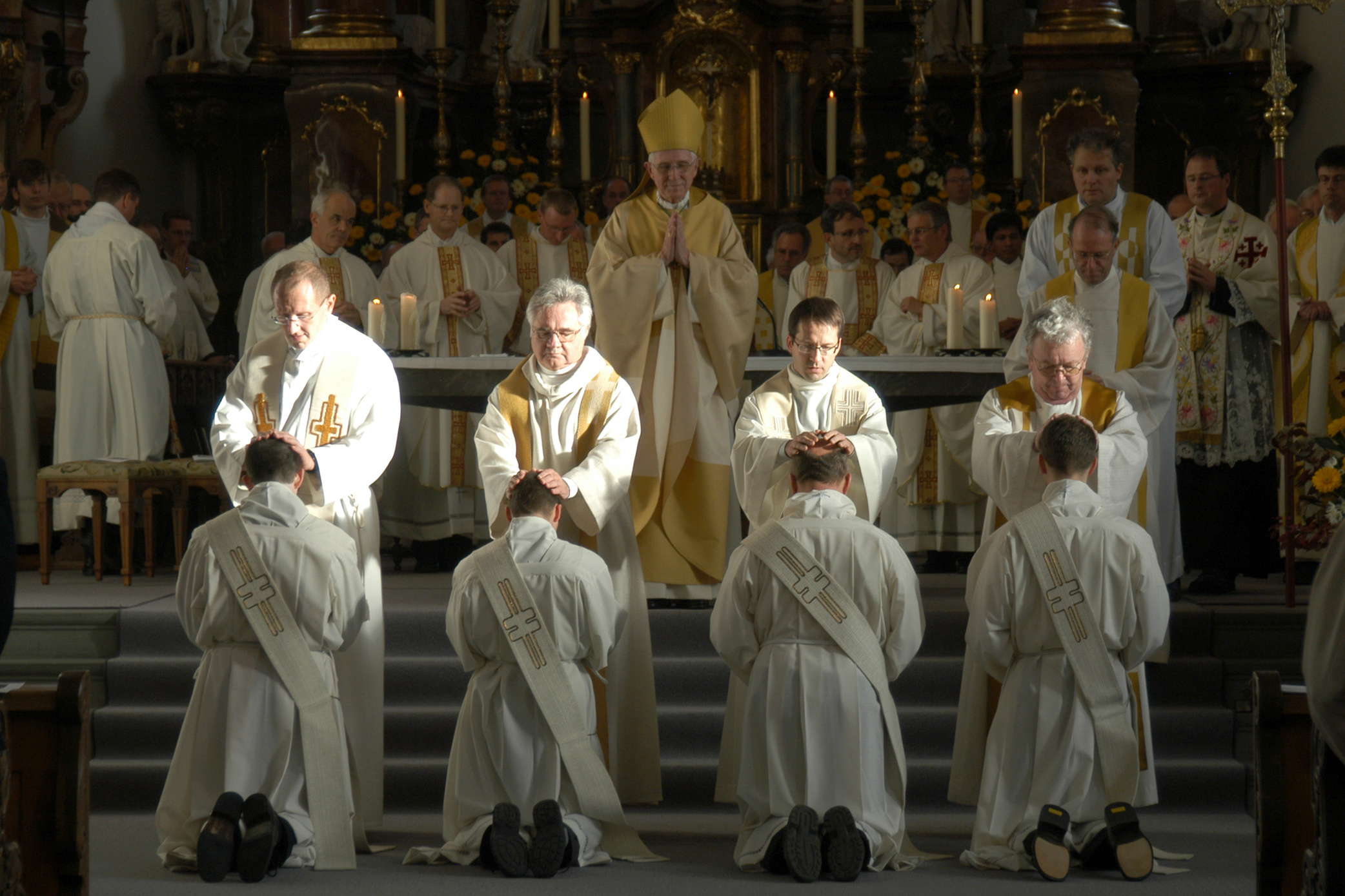
During the Rite of Ordination, after the bishop, the priests present lay their hands on the ordinands.

Coat of arms of a Catholic priest

The Rite of Ordination is what makes one a priest, having already been a deacon and with the minister of Holy Orders being a validly ordained bishop.

The Rite of Ordination occurs within the context of Holy Mass. After being called forward and presented to the assembly, the candidates are interrogated. Each promises to diligently perform the duties of the Priesthood and to respect and obey his ordinary (bishop or religious superior). Then the candidates lie prostrate before the altar, while the assembled faithful kneel and pray for the help of all the saints in the singing of the Litany of the Saints. The essential part of the rite is when the bishop silently lays his hands upon each candidate (followed by all priests present), before offering the consecratory prayer, addressed to God the Father, invoking the power of the Holy Spirit upon those being ordained. After the consecratory prayer, the newly ordained is vested with the stole and chasuble of those belonging to the Ministerial Priesthood and then the bishop anoints his hands with chrism before presenting him with the chalice and paten which he will use when presiding at the Eucharist.

== Lifestyle and duties ==
The Second Vatican Council's decree Presbyterorum ordinis refers to certain tensions in the life of a priest:

[they] are taken from among men and ordained for men in the things that belong to God in order to offer gifts and sacrifices for sins, [but] nevertheless live on earth with other men as brothers... They cannot be ministers of Christ unless they be witnesses and dispensers of a life other than earthly life. But they cannot be of service to men if they remain strangers to the life and conditions of men.

The life of a priest is characterised by obedience to his bishop alongside his cooperation with him in his episcopal ministry. The Council also linked suitability for appointment as a pastor or parish priest not only with knowledge of Christian doctrine, but also with "piety, apostolic zeal and other gifts and qualities which are necessary for the proper exercise of the care of souls".

Bishops and priests, and also deacons who intend to become priests, are required to recite the principal and minor offices of the Liturgy of the Hours, or Divine Office, daily, a practice which is also followed by non-ordained people in some religious orders. For priests and bishops, the habit of celebrating mass every day is "strongly urged".

A priest who is a pastor or parish priest is responsible for the administration of a Catholic parish, typically with a single church building dedicated for worship (and usually a nearby residence), and for seeing to the spiritual needs of Catholics who belong to the parish. This involves performing ceremonies for the seven sacraments of the Catholic Church, and counseling people. He may be assisted by other diocesan priests and deacons, and serves under the local diocesan bishop, who is in charge of the many parishes in the territory of the diocese or archdiocese. In some cases due to the shortage of priests and the expense of a full-time priest for depopulated parishes, a team of priests in solidum may share the management of several parishes.

According to Catholic doctrine, a priest or bishop is necessary in order to perform the ceremony of the Eucharist, hear confessions, and perform Anointing of the Sick. Deacons may distribute Holy Communion after a priest or bishop has consecrated the bread and wine, and, in extraordinary circumstances, lay people, called "Extraordinary Ministers of Holy Communion", may do so as well. Priests and deacons ordinarily perform Baptism, but any Catholic can baptize in emergency circumstances. In cases where a person dies before the baptism ceremony is performed, the Catholic Church also recognizes baptism of desire, where a person desired to be baptized, and baptism of blood, when a person is martyred for their faith.

According to canon law, a parish priest or bishop, or another priest or deacon delegated by them, ordinarily performs ("assists") Holy Matrimony, but the role can be delegated to a layperson if that is impractical and the arrangements are supported by the conference of bishops and the Holy See, and in an emergency a couple can perform the ceremony themselves as long as there are two witnesses. Church doctrine says it is the couple actually conferring marriage upon each other, and the minister is merely assisting and witnessing that it has been done properly.

Presbyterorum ordinis makes extensive references to the duties, aims and working methods of priests, including their dedication, tirelessness, and endurance. A willingness to innovate, subject to hierarchical guidance, and a drive for continuous improvement in pastoral practice, are both encouraged within the decree. The document also provided for the establishment of a "Senate of Priests" within each diocese, i.e. a representative body able to give the bishop advice on behalf of all the priests in his diocese.

== Clerical celibacy ==
=== Early Christianity ===
The earliest Christians were Jews and Jewish tradition has always deemed the married state as more spiritual than the celibate state. However, some Christian traditions place a higher spiritual value on chastity. According to the Bible, the Apostle Peter had a spouse from Gospel stories of Peter's mother-in-law sick with fever (Matt 8:14, Mark 1:29, Luke 4:38) and from Paul's mention that Peter took along a believing wife in his ministry (1 Cor 9:5). In I Corinthians 7, Paul makes it clear that celibacy is superior to the married state: "Now to the unmarried and the widows I say: It is good for them to stay unmarried, as I do... I would like you to be free from concern. An unmarried man is concerned about the Lord's affairs—how he can please the Lord. But a married man is concerned about the affairs of this world... An unmarried woman or virgin is concerned about the Lord’s affairs; [b]ut a married woman is concerned about the affairs of this world[.] I am saying this for your own good, not to restrict you, but that you may live in a right way in undivided devotion to the Lord. ...So then, he who marries the virgin does right, but he who does not marry her does better."

From its beginnings, the idea of clerical celibacy has been contested in canon courts, in theology, and in religious practices. Celibacy for Roman Catholic priests was not mandated under canon law for the universal church until the Second Lateran Council in 1139.

The Council of Elvira in Spain (c. 305–306) was the first council to call for clerical celibacy. In February 385, Pope Siricius wrote the Directa decretal, which was a long letter to Spanish bishop Himerius of Tarragona, replying to the bishop's requests on various subjects, which had been sent several months earlier to Pope Damasus I. It was the first of a series of documents published by the church's magisterium that claimed apostolic origin for clerical celibacy.

=== After the Great Schism ===
Within a century of the Great Schism of 1054, the Churches of the East and West arrived at different disciplines as to abstaining from sexual contact during marriage. In the East, candidates for the priesthood could be married with permission to have regular sexual relations with their wives, but were required to abstain before celebrating the Eucharist. An unmarried person, once ordained, could not marry. Additionally, the Christian East required that, before becoming a bishop, a priest separate from his wife (she was permitted to object), with her typically becoming a nun. In the East, more normally, bishops are chosen from those priests who are monks and are thus unmarried.

In the West, the law of celibacy became mandatory by Pope Gregory VII at the Roman Synod of 1074. This law mandated that, in order to become a candidate for ordination, a man could not be married. The law remains in effect in the Latin Church, although not for those who are priests of the Eastern Catholic Churches, who remain under their own discipline. (These churches either remained in or returned to full communion with Rome after the schism, unlike for example the Eastern Orthodox Church which is now entirely separate). The issue of mandatory celibacy in the Latin Church continues to be debated.

== Eastern Catholic Churches ==
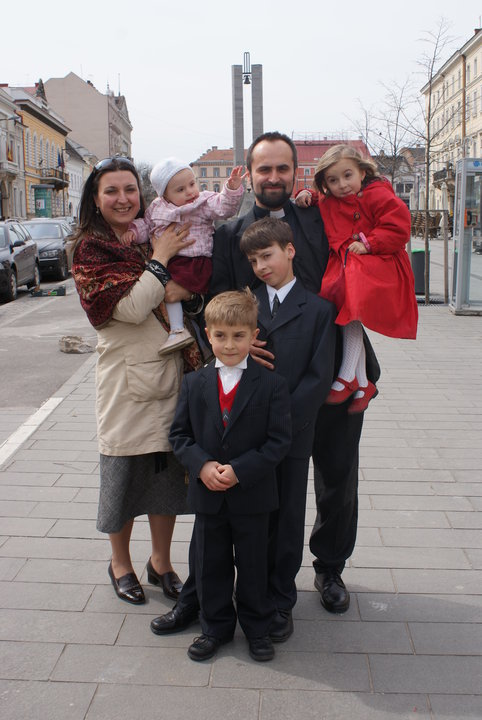
Married Romanian Eastern Catholic priest from Romania with his family

The Catholic Church has different rules for the priesthood in the 23 Eastern Catholic Churches than those in the Latin Church. The chief difference is that most of the Eastern Catholic Churches ordain married men, whereas the Latin Church, with very few exceptions, enforces mandatory clerical celibacy. This issue has caused tension among Catholics in some situations where Eastern churches established parishes in countries with established Latin Catholic populations. In the Americas and Australia, this tension led to bans on married Eastern Catholic priests, all of which were overturned by Pope Francis in 2014.

Within the lands of the Eastern Christendom, priests' children often became priests and married within their social group, establishing a tightly-knit hereditary caste among some Eastern Christian communities.

== Numbers of priests ==
According to the Annuario Pontificio 2016, as of December 31, 2014, there were 415,792 Catholic priests worldwide, including both diocesan priests and priests in the religious orders. The number of priests worldwide has remained fairly steady since 1970, decreasing by about 5,000. This stagnation is due to a balancing of large growth in Africa and Asia and a significant decrease in North America and Europe.

Historical number of priests worldwide

Year	Priests	±%
1970	419,728	—
1975	404,783	−3.6%
1980	413,600	+2.2%
1985	403,480	−2.4%

Year	Priests	±%
1990	403,173	−0.1%
1995	404,750	+0.4%
2000	405,178	+0.1%
2005	406,411	+0.3%

Year	Priests	±%
2010	412,236	+1.4%
2014	414,313	+0.5%

Includes both diocesan and religious priests.

=== Asia ===
==== Singapore ====
Historical number of priests in Singapore

Year	Priests	±%
1950	43	—
1969	105	+144.2%
1980	90	−14.3%

Year	Priests	±%
1990	119	+32.2%
2000	140	+17.6%
2004	137	−2.1%

Year	Priests	±%
2010	131	−4.4%
2014	145	+10.7%

Includes both diocesan and religious priests.

=== Europe ===
==== Belgium ====
Historical number of priests in Belgium

Year	Priests	±%
1950	14,690	—
1970	12,100	−17.6%
1980	12,741	+5.3%

Year	Priests	±%
1990	9,912	−22.2%
2000	6,989	−29.5%
2004	6,366	−8.9%

Year	Priests	±%
2013	5,595	−12.1%

Includes both diocesan and religious priests.

==== France ====
Historical number of priests in France

Year	Priests	±%
1955	40,000	—
1956	32,475	−18.8%

Year	Priests	±%
2003	17,473	−46.2%
2006	15,440	−11.6%

Year	Priests	±%
2013	14,000	−9.3%

Includes both diocesan and religious priests.

==== Luxembourg ====
Historical number of priests in Luxembourg

Year	Priests	±%
1950	601	—
1969	524	−12.8%

Year	Priests	±%
1980	457	−12.8%
1990	352	−23.0%

Year	Priests	±%
2004	248	−29.5%
2013	205	−17.3%

Includes both diocesan and religious priests.

==== Poland ====
Historical number of priests in Poland
Year / Priests / ±%; 1848 / 2,218 / —	Year / Priests / ±%; 1912 / 6,500 / +193.1%	Year / Priests / ±%
Includes both diocesan and religious priests.

==== Sweden ====
Historical number of priests in Sweden

Year	Priests	±%
1949	45	—
1969	80	+77.8%
1980	99	+23.8%

Year	Priests	±%
1990	110	+11.1%
2000	134	+21.8%
2004	151	+12.7%

Year	Priests	±%
2010	156	+3.3%
2014	159	+1.9%

Includes both diocesan and religious priests.

==== Switzerland ====
Historical number of priests in Switzerland
Year / Priests / ±%; 1970 / 2,877 / —	Year / Priests / ±%; 1989 / 2,100 / −27.0%	Year / Priests / ±%; 2009 / 1,441 / −31.4%
Includes both diocesan and religious priests.

=== North America ===
==== Mexico ====
Historical number of priests in Mexico

Year	Priests	±%
1980	10,192	—
1990	11,641	+14.2%

Year	Priests	±%
2000	14,176	+21.8%
2010	16,856	+18.9%

Year	Priests	±%

Includes both diocesan and religious priests.

==== United States ====
Historical number of priests in the US

Year	Priests	±%
1930	27,000	—
1950	50,500	+87.0%
1965	58,632	+16.1%
1970	59,192	+1.0%
1975	58,909	−0.5%

Year	Priests	±%
1980	58,398	−0.9%
1985	57,317	−1.9%
1990	52,124	−9.1%
1995	49,054	−5.9%
2000	45,699	−6.8%

Year	Priests	±%
2005	41,399	−9.4%
2010	39,993	−3.4%
2015	37,192	−7.0%

Includes both diocesan and religious priests.

== See also ==
- Amovibility, some canon law applying to priests
- List of Catholic priests
- Ordination of women and the Catholic Church
- Religious minister
- Vocational discernment in the Catholic Church
- Impediment (Catholic canon law)
