= Theology of the Priesthood (Catholic Church) =

Theology of the Catholic priesthood

The theology of the Catholic priesthood is rooted in the priesthood of Jesus Christ, who is considered the eternal High Priest of the New Covenant. The Catholic priesthood is understood as a continuation of the priesthood established in the Old Covenant, now fulfilled in Christ. Catholic teaching holds that priests are ordained to act in persona Christi ("in the person of Christ") in administering the sacraments, preaching the Gospel, and shepherding the faithful.

== Jewish priesthood ==
The origins of the priesthood trace back to the Old Testament, where Moses designated Aaron and his descendants from the tribe of Levi as priests to mediate between God and the people of Israel. These priests performed sacrificial rites, offered incense, and maintained the holiness of the Tabernacle and later the Temple in Jerusalem.

The Levitical priesthood required repeated sacrifices for atonement. Christian theology teaches that Jesus Christ, as the Messiah, became the eternal High Priest, offering himself as the perfect and final sacrifice for the redemption of humanity.

== The priesthood of Christ ==
Catholic doctrine teaches that Jesus Christ uniquely fulfilled the threefold office of prophet, priest, and king. As High Priest, He offered himself as the perfect sacrifice on the cross and continues his priestly intercession in heaven.

According to the Epistle to the Hebrews, Christ's priesthood is of the order of Melchizedek, rather than the Levitical priesthood. Unlike the priests of the Old Covenant, Christ's priesthood is eternal, and his singular sacrifice suffices for all time. The priesthood of Christ is perpetuated among the baptised faithful, who form "a whole community of believers", and among those who are ordained. The Catechism of the Catholic Church (1992) refers to "two participations in the one priesthood of Christ".

== The Sacrament of Holy Orders ==
The Sacrament of Holy Orders is the means by which the ministerial priesthood of Christ is perpetuated in the Church. Through this sacrament, bishops, priests, and deacons are ordained into a hierarchical structure that reflects the apostolic ministry. The Second Vatican Council stated that God gives those who are ordained "a special grace" enabling them to minister among the people they serve.

The Catholic Church recognizes three degrees within Holy Orders:

- The bishop (episcopate) possesses the fullness of the priesthood and has the authority to ordain others.
- The priest (presbyterate) serves as a co-worker with the bishop, administering sacraments and leading a congregation.
- The deacon (diaconate) assists priests and bishops, focusing on ministry, charity, and the liturgy.

== The Eucharistic Sacrifice ==
The priesthood is most closely linked to the Eucharist, which the Church considers the central act of worship. Catholic doctrine holds that, during the celebration of the Eucharist, the priest consecrates bread and wine, transforming them into the Body and Blood of Christ through transubstantiation. This sacrifice of Christ is prefigured by the Old Testament sacrifices, offered by the Levite Priests. Christ abolished the Levitical sacrifices, as His sacrifice, being a perfect sacrifice, was sufficient to expiate all sins, and merit for man every grace.

According to Catholic theology, the Eucharistic sacrifice makes present the one sacrifice of Christ on Calvary, though in an unbloody manner. The priest acts in the person of Christ (in persona Christi) during this sacred rite.

== Apostolic succession ==
The Catholic priesthood derives its authority through apostolic succession, the unbroken transmission of spiritual authority from the Apostles to the present-day bishops and priests. The Church maintains that only bishops, as successors of the Apostles, have the power to ordain new priests and bishops.

== Celibacy and the priesthood ==
The Latin Rite of the Catholic Church requires priests to take a vow of clerical celibacy, except in certain circumstances such as the ordination of married converts from Anglicanism or Orthodoxy. Celibacy is seen as a sign of total devotion to God and the Church, following the example of Christ.

In the Eastern Catholic Churches, married men may be ordained to the priesthood, though bishops are always chosen from among celibate clergy.

== See also ==
- Priesthood in the Catholic Church
- Holy Orders
- Eucharist in the Catholic Church
- Apostolic succession
- Sacramental theology

== Sources and further reading ==
- Herbermann, Charles, ed. (1913). "Priest". Catholic Encyclopedia. New York: Robert Appleton Company.
- Herbermann, Charles, ed. (1913). "Priesthood". Catholic Encyclopedia. New York: Robert Appleton Company.
- Herbermann, Charles, ed. (1913). "Holy Orders". Catholic Encyclopedia. New York: Robert Appleton Company.
- Catechism of the Catholic Church. Libreria Editrice Vaticana. 1992.
- Hahn, Scott (2009). Covenant and Communion: The Biblical Theology of Pope Benedict XVI. Brazos Press.
- "Lumen Gentium". Vatican.
- "Presbyterorum ordinis (Decree on the Ministry and Life of Priests)". Vatican. 7 December 1965.
- "Code of Canon Law (1983)". Vatican.
- Pope Pius XI (20 December 1935). "Ad Catholici Sacerdotii". New Advent.
