= Portglenone Abbey =

Cistercian monastery in County Antrim, Northern Ireland

Coordinates: 54.873°N 6.473°W

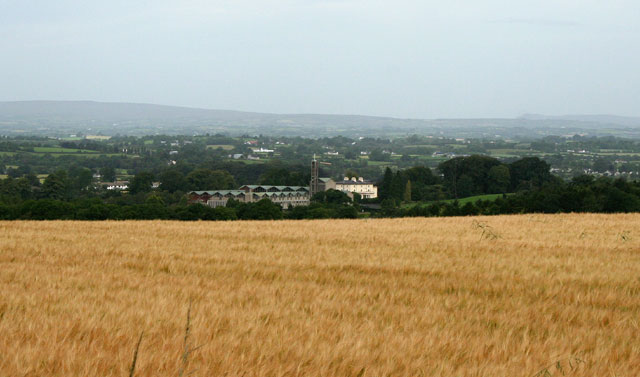
Our Lady of Bethlehem Abbey from Top Wood

Our Lady of Bethlehem Abbey, also known as Portglenone Abbey, is a Cistercian monastery in Portglenone, County Antrim, Northern Ireland, founded in 1948 by the Cistercian community of Mount Melleray Abbey in County Waterford. The monks bought Portglenone House, a country mansion built c. 1810 by the Church of Ireland Bishop Dr. Alexander who demolished the local castle. History records that Sir Roger Casement often stayed in the house in the early years of the 20th century.

Despite opposition from local Protestants, the monastery succeeded in establishing itself in the locality and ran a dairy farm for many years. Our Lady of Bethlehem Abbey was the first enclosed monastery of men to be established in Northern Ireland since the Reformation.

The monastery belongs to the Order of Cistercians of the Strict Observance (OCSO), also known as Trappists, who follow the Rule of St Benedict, but emphasise some of the more austere and penitential aspects of the Rule such as strict silence, abstention from meat, early rising and physical work.

In 1962, the community built a new monastery designed in a modern style by Padraig Ó Muireadhaigh (Note: "Ó Muireadhaigh" is commonly anglicised as "Murray", hence the following citation crediting Padraig Murray with designing the monastery.), which was completed in 1971. The building has won several architectural awards. To establish continuity with the Order's past, stones from some of the pre-Reformation Irish Cistercian abbeys were incorporated in the church and cloisters.

== Abbots ==
Abbots of the abbey have included:

- 1948–1953 – Abbot Oliver Farrell
- 1958–1977 – Abbot Aengus Dunphy (1921–2014); he was subsequently chaplain in Our Lady of Praise, Butende in Masaka, Uganda from 1979–1991.
- 1977–2024 – Abbot Celsus Kelly
- 2024 – Aelred Magee (Superior ad Nutum)

== See also ==
- Abbeys and priories in Northern Ireland (County Antrim)
