= Himerius of Tarragona =

Himerius of Tarragona (fl. 385) was bishop of Tarragona during the 4th century.

He is most notable as being the recipient of the Directa Decretal, written by Pope Siricius in February 385 AD. It took the form of a long letter to Himerius replying to the bishop's requests on various subjects sent several months earlier to Pope Damasus I. It became the first of a series of documents published by the Magisterium that claimed apostolic origin for clerical celibacy and reminded ministers of the altar of the perpetual continence required of them.
