= Directa Decretal =

Decretal by Pope Siricius

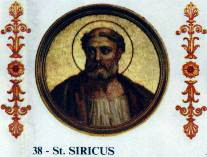
Pope Siricius, author of the Directa decretal

The Directa decretal was written by Pope Siricius in February AD 385. It took the form of a long letter to Spanish bishop Himerius of Tarragona replying to the bishop’s requests for directa on various subjects sent several months earlier to Pope Damasus I. It became the first of a series of documents published by the Magisterium that claimed apostolic origin for clerical celibacy and reminded ministers of the altar of the perpetual continence required of them.

== Background ==
It is known that the First Ecumenical Council which took place at Nicaea included in its legislation a discipline of the priesthood known as clerical 'continence' or celibacy. This was the requirement of all priests and bishops to refrain from sexual contact with their wives or with any other woman. Thus, for a married man to become a priest, his wife had to agree to abstain from all sexual relations. This discipline added to the legislation of various councils, particularly the Council of Elvira, the date of which cannot be determined with precision, but believed to have been in the first quarter of the fourth century, in Spain.

While priests of the East and West were required to refrain from all sexual contact by virtue of their presiding at sacrifices, this was an exceedingly difficult discipline to maintain. Just as the Levite priests of the Jewish Temple in Jerusalem had been required to abstain from sexual contact (in order to achieve ritual purity) merely for a lengthy period prior to the periodic performance of the sacrifices of the temple, so the priests of the Early Church were required by ecclesiastical law to abstain from sexual contact. However, Christian priests presided at the sacrifice of the Eucharist every Sunday as well as the annual feasts of the various martyrs. Thus, the Christian calendar did not afford Christian priests periods in which they could be sexually active with their wives.

== The Directa Decretal ==
In the Directa, the Pope dealt with the fact that clerics (deacons, priests, and bishops) were still living with their wives and having children, thus contravening the Council of Elvira and the First Ecumenical Council. Priests were justifying this by referring to the traditions of the Levitical priesthood of the Old Testament. Siricius was emphatic that clerical continence belonged to immemorial, even apostolic, tradition. He declared that priests had been under a duty to observe temporary continence when serving in the Temple, but that the coming of Christ had brought the old priesthood to completion, and by this fact the duty of temporary continence had become an obligation to perpetual continence. Fifteen points are studied in the decretal, but the key passage is:

The Lord Jesus formally stipulated in the Gospel that he had not come to abolish the law, but to bring it to perfection; this is also why he wanted the beauty of the Church whose Bridegroom he is to shine with the splendor of chastity so that when he returns, on the Day of Judgment, he will find her without stain or wrinkle, as his Apostle taught. It is through the indissoluble law of these decisions that all of us, priests and deacons, are bound together from the day of our ordination, and [held to] put our hearts and our bodies to the service of sobriety and purity; may we be pleasing to our God in all things, in the sacrifice we offer daily.

Continence is still required of Catholic priests today; many Eastern Catholic Churches do not require celibacy of their priests.

== See also ==
- Clerical celibacy (Catholic Church)
