= Right of Option =

Catholic canon law

In Catholic canon law, Right of Option is a way of obtaining a benefice or a title, by the choice of the new titulary himself.

== History ==
Many chapters enjoyed this right formerly and it is still the privilege of some: the canon, who has held his office for the longest time may, in conformity with the statutory regulation, resign the prebend he enjoys to accept another that has become vacant.

A second right of option existed in France before 1789: by virtue of a custom a prebendary, who was appointed to and had entered into possession of a benefice incompatible with one he already held, was entitled to select whichever of the two he preferred, when, according to the common law, he had already lost the incompatible benefice which he had previously held. The right of option still exists with regard to cardinalitial titles.

== Derivations in public law ==
In this way the Catholic canon law first established an "incompatibility", giving life to the prohibition of the simultaneous possession of two ecclesiastical benefices. Since this sanction forward, also public law enshrined the same solution in order to prevent the conflict of interests (for example between electoral mandates or different public offices) in a way less drastic than an ineligibility or a disfranchisement.
