= Excitator =

From the Latin for 'to arouse', the excitator in Roman Catholic seminaries, monasteries and convents was the member of the community charged with the job of awakening community members each morning. Traditionally, the excitator (who usually held this post temporarily, as one of the community "chores" through which members would rotate) would knock on a bedroom door or open it slightly and loudly say, Benedicamus Domino! (Let us bless the Lord.) He or she was then to wait for the reply, Deo gratias! (Thanks be to God), which signaled that the occupant was now awake. Some communities maintain the tradition, while others now have members rely on their own alarm clocks.
