= Pope Siricius =

Head of the Catholic Church from 384 to 399

Pope Saint Siricius
- Bishop of Rome
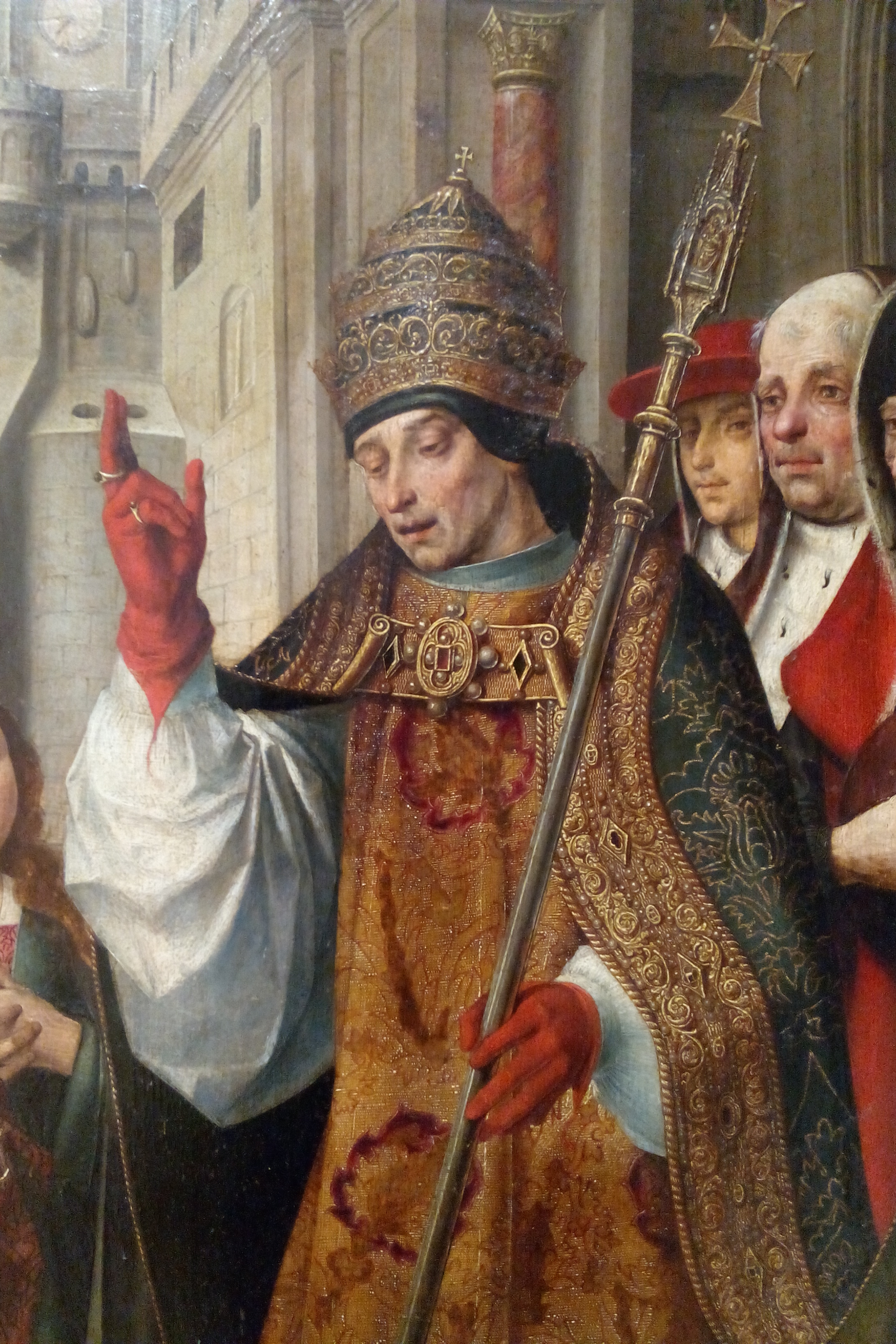
- Image from the Saint Auta Altarpiece (Lisbon) of Pope Siricius blessing Saint Auta and Conan Meriadoc
- Church: Catholic Church
- Papacy began: December 384
- Papacy ended: 26 November 399
- Predecessor: Damasus I
- Successor: Anastasius I

Personal details
- Born: 334 Rome, Roman Empire
- Died: 26 November 399 (aged 64–65) Rome, Italy, Western Roman Empire

Sainthood
- Feast day: 26 November

Pope Siricius (c. 334 – 26 November 399) was the bishop of Rome from December 384 to his death on 26 November 399. In response to inquiries from Bishop Himerius of Tarragona, Siricius issued the Directa decretal, containing decrees of baptism, church discipline and other matters. His are the oldest completely preserved papal decretals. He is sometimes said to have been the first bishop of Rome to call himself pope.

== Early life ==
Siricius was a native of Rome; his father's name was Tiburtius. Siricius entered the service of the Church at an early age and, according to the testimony of the inscription on his grave, was lector and then deacon of the Roman Church during the pontificate of Liberius.

== Pontificate ==
After the death of Damasus I, Siricius was elected pope unanimously, despite attempts by Ursinus to promote himself. Emperor Valentinian II's confirmation of his election stilled any further objections. Siricius was an active pope, involved in the administration of the Church and the handling of various factions and viewpoints within it. In response to a letter from Bishop Himerius of Tarragona, he issued the Directa decretal, containing decisions on fifteen different points, on matters regarding baptism, penance, church discipline and the celibacy of the clergy. His are the oldest completely preserved decretals.

=== Relationship to heretics and heathens ===
Siricius helped to mend the Meletian schism in Antioch. The schism stemmed from repeated exiles of Meletius of Antioch by Arianist Roman emperors over theological differences. Although Meletius himself had been in sufficiently good standing to lead the First Council of Constantinople in 381, his death at the council re-ingited the schism, as Meletius's followers objected to his successor. By the mediation of St. John Chrysostom and Theophilus of Alexandria an embassy, led by Bishop Acacius of Beroea, was sent to Rome to persuade Siricius to recognize Flavian and to readmit him to communion with the Church of Rome.

When the Spanish bishop and ascetic Priscillian, accused by his fellow bishops of heresy, was executed by Emperor Magnus Maximus under the charge of magic, Siricius—along with Ambrose of Milan and Martin of Tours—protested against the verdict to the emperor.

Some older sources claim Siricius fought against Manichaeism in Rome, though this is likely a mistake. Louis Duchesne's 19th century version of the Liber Pontificalis claimed that Siricius took severe measures against the Manichaeans in Rome, but Duchesne also notes that Saint Augustine does not mention any such repression. As Augustine had converted from Manichaeism to Catholicism while living in Rome under Siricius's reign, later authors generally believe these anti-Manichaean efforts were misattributed to Siricius, when they actually occurred under the later Pope Leo I. Confusion may also stem from anti-Manchaean actions undertaken by Siricius's contemporary Western Roman emperors, including Honorius and Valentinian II.

=== Papal titles ===
Siricius is sometimes said to be the first bishop of Rome to style himself pope, but other authorities say the title pope was from the early 3rd century an honorific designation used for any bishop in the West. In the East it was used only for the patriarch of Alexandria. Marcellinus (d. 304) is the first bishop of Rome shown in sources to have had the title pope used of him. From the 6th century, the imperial chancery of Constantinople normally reserved this designation for the bishop of Rome. From the early 6th century, it began to be confined in the West to the bishop of Rome, a practice that was firmly in place by the 11th century.

Siricius is also one of the popes presented in various sources as having been the first to bear the title pontifex maximus. Others that are said to have been the first to bear the title are Callistus I, Damasus I, Leo I, and Gregory I. The Oxford Dictionary of the Christian Church indicates instead that it was in the fifteenth century (when the Renaissance stirred up new interest in ancient Rome) that pontifex maximus became a regular title of honour for popes.

== Death and veneration ==
Siricius died on 26 November 399 and was succeeded by Anastasius I. He is buried in the basilica of San Silvestro. His feast day is 26 November.

== See also ==
- List of Catholic saints
- List of popes

Titles of the Great Christian Church
Preceded by Damasus I	Pope; 384–399	Succeeded by Anastasius I
