= Clerical celibacy =

Requirement in certain religions that some or all members of the clergy be unmarried

Clerical celibacy is the requirement in certain religions that some or all members of the clergy be unmarried. Clerical celibacy also requires abstention from deliberately indulging in sexual thoughts and behavior outside of marriage, because these impulses are regarded as sinful. Vows of celibacy are generally required for monks and nuns in Christianity, Buddhism, Hinduism, Jainism and other religions, but often not for other clergy.

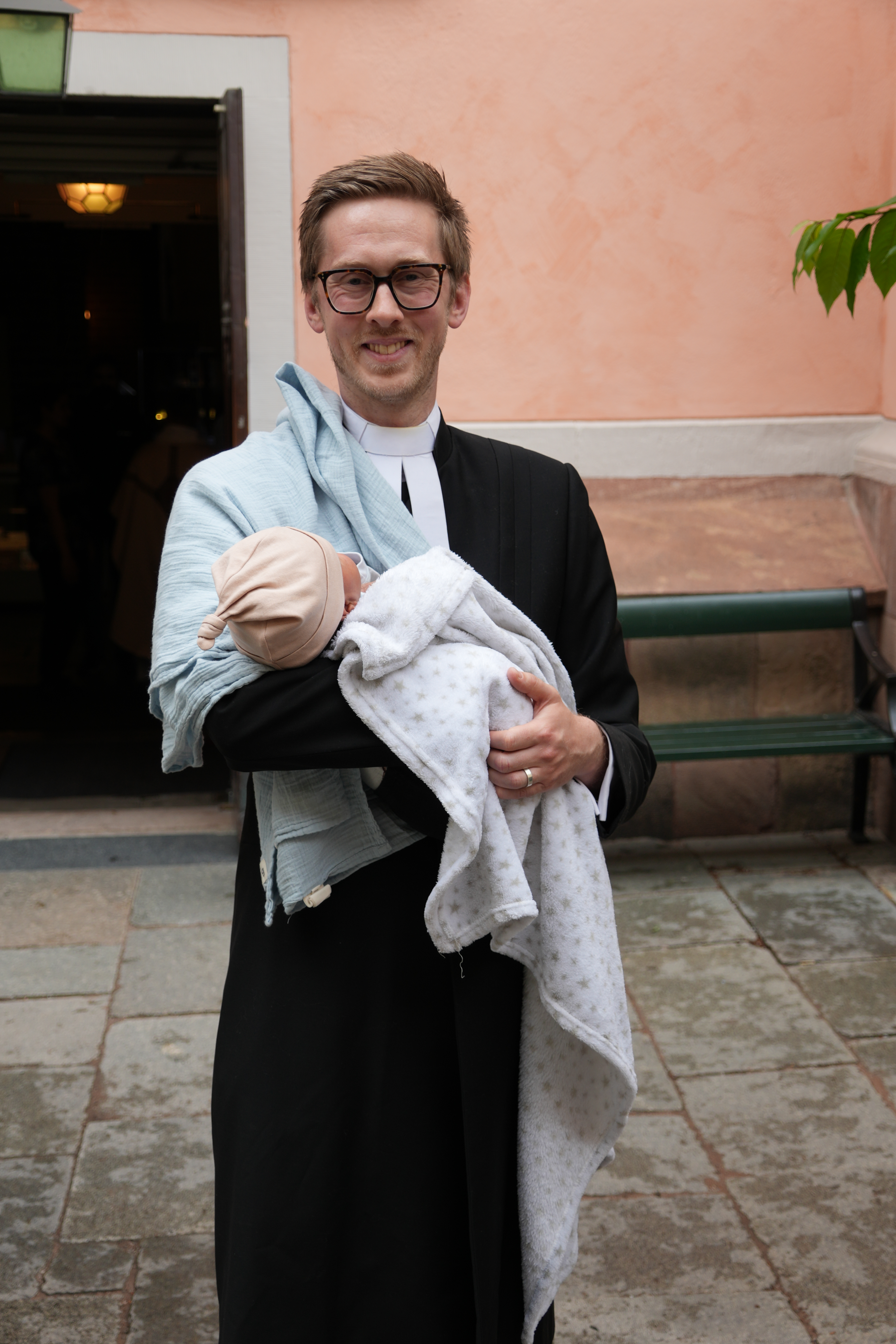
A married Lutheran priest carrying his infant child in front of Stockholm Cathedral

Within the Catholic Church, clerical celibacy is mandated for all clergy in the Latin Church except in the permanent diaconate. Exceptions are sometimes admitted for ordination to transitional diaconate and priesthood on a case-by-case basis for married clergymen of other churches or communities who become Catholics, but ordination of married men to the episcopacy is excluded (see Personal ordinariate). Clerical marriage is not allowed and therefore, if those for whom in some particular church celibacy is optional (such as permanent deacons in the Latin Church) wish to marry, they must do so before ordination. Eastern Catholic Churches either follow the same rules as the Latin Church or require celibacy for bishops while allowing priestly ordination of married men.

In the Eastern Orthodox Church and Oriental Orthodoxy, celibacy is the norm for bishops; married men may be ordained to the priesthood, but even married priests whose wives pre-decease them are not allowed to remarry after ordination. Similarly, celibacy is not a requirement for ordination as a deacon and in some Oriental Orthodox churches deacons may marry after ordination. For a period in the 5th and early 6th centuries the Church of the East did not apply the rule of celibacy even for ordination to the episcopate.

Lutheranism, Anglicanism and Nonconformist Protestantism in general do not require celibacy of its clergy and allow—or even encourage—clerical marriage. In the past, Lutheran deaconesses in the Church of Sweden took vows of celibacy, poverty and ties to a motherhouse; the vow of celibacy was made optional in the 1960s and in the present-day, Lutheran deacons/deaconesses (both male and female) may marry.

== Meanings of 'celibacy' ==
The word celibacy can mean either the state of being unmarried or sexual abstinence, especially because of religious vows, from sexual intercourse.

In the canon law of the Latin Church, the word celibacy is used specifically in the sense of being unmarried. However, for its clergy this state of being unmarried is considered to be a consequence of the obligation to be completely and perpetually continent:

Clerics are obliged to observe perfect and perpetual continence for the sake of the kingdom of heaven and therefore are bound to celibacy which is a special gift of God by which sacred ministers can adhere more easily to Christ with an undivided heart and are able to dedicate themselves more freely to the service of God and humanity.

Permanent deacons, namely those deacons who are not intended to become priests, are, in general, exempted from this rule. However, married permanent deacons are not allowed to remarry after the death of their spouse.

The Catechism of the Catholic Church states:

All the ordained ministers of the Latin Church, with the exception of permanent deacons, are normally chosen from among men of faith who live a celibate life and who intend to remain celibate "for the sake of the kingdom of heaven." Called to consecrate themselves with undivided heart to the Lord and to "the affairs of the Lord", they give themselves entirely to God and to men. Celibacy is a sign of this new life to the service of which the Church's minister is consecrated; accepted with a joyous heart celibacy radiantly proclaims the Reign of God. In the Eastern Churches a different discipline has been in force for many centuries: while bishops are chosen solely from among celibates, married men can be ordained as deacons and priests. This practice has long been considered legitimate; these priests exercise a fruitful ministry within their communities. Moreover, priestly celibacy is held in great honor in the Eastern Churches and many priests have freely chosen it for the sake of the Kingdom of God. In the East as in the West a man who has already received the sacrament of Holy Orders can no longer marry.

On the granting of permission, by exception, for the priestly ordination of married men in the Latin Church, see Rules, below.

== Background ==
In some Christian churches, such as the western and some eastern sections of the Catholic Church, priests and bishops must as a rule be unmarried men. In others, such as the Eastern Orthodox Church, the churches of Oriental Orthodoxy and some of the Eastern Catholic Churches, married men may be ordained as deacons or priests, but may not remarry if their wife dies, and celibacy is required only of bishops. Since celibacy is seen as a consequence of the obligation of continence, it implies abstinence from sexual relationships. The Code of Canon Law prescribes:

Clerics are to behave with due prudence towards persons whose company can endanger their obligation to observe continence or give rise to scandal among the faithful.

According to Jason Berry of The New York Times, "The requirement of celibacy is not dogma; it is an ecclesiastical law that was adopted in the Middle Ages because Rome was worried that clerics' children would inherit church property and create dynasties."

In some Christian churches, a vow of chastity is made by members of religious orders or monastic communities, along with vows of poverty and obedience, in order to imitate the life of Jesus of Nazareth (see also Evangelical counsels). This vow of chastity, made by people – not all of whom are clergy – is different from what is the obligation, not a vow, of clerical continence and celibacy.

Celibacy for religious and monastics (monks and sisters/nuns) and for bishops is upheld by the Catholic Church and the traditions of both Eastern Orthodoxy and Oriental Orthodoxy. Bishops must be unmarried men or widowers; a married man cannot become a bishop. In Latin Church Catholicism and in some Eastern Catholic Churches, most priests are celibate men. Exceptions are admitted, with there being several Catholic priests who were received into the Catholic Church from the Lutheran Church, Anglican Communion and other Protestant faiths. In most Orthodox traditions and in some Eastern Catholic Churches men who are already married may be ordained priests, but priests may not marry after ordination.

Neither the Catholic nor the Orthodox tradition considers the rule of clerical celibacy to be an unchangeable dogma, but instead as a rule that could be adjusted if the Church thought it appropriate and to which exceptions are admitted.

From the time of the first ecumenical council the Christian church forbids voluntary physical castration, and the alleged self-castration of the theologian Origen was used to discredit him.

== Clerical continence in Christianity ==
=== First century ===
Some of the earliest Christian leaders were married men. The mention in Mark 1:30, Luke 4:38, and Matthew 8:14–15 of Peter's mother-in-law indicates that he had at some time been married (Matthew 8:14–15: "when Jesus was come into Peter's house, he saw his wife's mother laid, and sick of a fever.") According to Clement of Alexandria, "Peter and Philip begat children", and Peter's wife suffered martyrdom.

On the other hand, in Luke 18:28–30, Jesus responds to Peter's statement that he and the other disciples had left all and followed him by saying "there is no one who has left house or wife or brothers or parents or children for the sake of the kingdom of God who will not receive back an overabundant return in this present age and eternal life in the age to come".

In 1 Corinthians 7:8, Paul the Apostle indicates that he was unmarried: either single or a widower. In 1 Corinthians 9:5, he contrasts his situation with that of the other apostles, including Peter, who were accompanied by believing wives. Paul, says Laurent Cleenewerck, a priest of the Orthodox Church in America and professor of theology at Euclid University, clearly favored celibacy, which he understood as "a gift". Cleenewerck supports this statement by quoting 1 Corinthians 7:5–8:

Do not deprive one another except perhaps by agreement for a set time, to devote yourselves to prayer, and then come together again, so that Satan may not tempt you because of your lack of self-control. This I say by way of concession, not of command. I wish that all were as I myself am. But each has a particular gift from God, one having one kind and another a different kind. To the unmarried and the widows I say that it is well for them to remain unmarried as I am. But if they are not practicing self-control, they should marry. For it is better to marry than to be aflame with passion.

In the same chapter Paul, who wrote that a pastor is to be "the husband of one wife", forbids abstinence of marital relations except "for a set time" and states that celibacy is a gift.

A locus classicus used in favour of sacerdotal celibacy is 1 Corinthians 7:32–33 ("The unmarried man is anxious about the things of the Lord, how to please the Lord. But the married man is anxious about worldly things, how to please his wife") and a locus classicus used against sacerdotal celibacy is the statement in 1 Timothy 3:2–4 that a bishop should be "the husband of one wife" and "one who ruleth well his own house, having his children in subjection".

One interpretation of "the husband of one wife" is that the man to be ordained could not have been married more than once and that perfect continence, total abstinence, was expected from him starting on the day of his ordination. Usually these also conclude that, because of the exclusion of sexual relations, the members of the clergy were not entitled to marry after ordination.

Another interpretation of "the husband of one wife" was a prohibition of polygamy, which was not uncommon in the Old Testament (King David and King Solomon, for example, were polygamists).

On the other hand, George T. Dennis SJ of Catholic University of America says: "There is simply no clear evidence of a general tradition or practice, much less of an obligation, of priestly celibacy-continence before the beginning of the fourth century." Peter Fink SJ agrees, saying that underlying premises used in the book, Apostolic Origins of Priestly Celibacy, "would not stand up so comfortably to historical scrutiny". Dennis says this book provides no evidence that celibacy had apostolic origins.

Similarly, Philippe Delhaye wrote: "During the first three or four centuries, no law was promulgated prohibiting clerical marriage. Celibacy was a matter of choice for bishops, priests, and deacons. [...] The apostolic constitutions (c. 400) excommunicated a priest or bishop who left his wife 'under pretense of piety' (Sacrorum Conciliorum nova et amplissima collectio 1:51)."

However, the 19th-century Protestant historian Philip Schaff evidences that by the early 4th century, priestly celibacy-continence was not a novelty, stating that all marriages contracted by clerics in Holy Orders were declared null and void in 530 by Emperor Justinian I, who also declared the children of such marriages illegitimate.

Catholic author Greg Dues states that:

Early heretics, such as Manichaeans and Montanists, added a negative influence by proclaiming that sexual expression—including that of the laity—was impure. Catholic leaders, such as St. Augustine, taught that Original Sin was transmitted through intercourse. Therefore, abstinence and virginity was the ideal life and only the weak should marry. However, most bishops and presbyters continued to marry. In fact, the only marriages that had to have any kind of blessing were those of deacons and priests.

The tradition of celibacy continued to evolve. In some places it was expected that priests be not sexually active after ordination. When monastic spirituality became popular in the fourth and fifth centuries, it promoted the ideal of celibacy as a model for all priests.

One way church authority enforced celibacy was by ordaining monks, who took the vow of chastity, to evangelize large areas of Europe. Church authority continued to mandate celibacy. The First Lateran Council (1123–1153) forbade those in orders to marry and ordered all those already married to renounce their wives and do penance. Later legislation declared the marriages of clerics not only illegal but also invalid. Widespread disregard of these laws continued until a reorganization of preparation for priesthood following the Protestant Reformation and the Council of Trent in the 1500s.

=== Second to third centuries ===
Tertullian (c. 160 – c. 225), writing of the apostles, indicated that he was obliged to believe that apart from Peter, who was certainly married, the apostles were continent. In his De praescriptione contra haereticos, Tertullian mentioned continence as one of the customs in Mithraism that he claimed were imitated from Christianity, but does not associate it specifically with the clergy. In De exhortatione castitatis, Tertullian did regard with honour those in ecclesiastical orders who remained continent.

The Didascalia Apostolorum, written in Greek in the first half of the 3rd century, mentions the requirements of chastity on the part of both the bishop and his wife, and of the children being already brought up, when it quotes 1 Timothy 3:2–4 as requiring that, before someone is ordained a bishop, enquiry be made "whether he be chaste, and whether his wife also be a believer and chaste; and whether he has brought up his children in the fear of God".

There is record of a number of 3rd-century married bishops in good standing, even in the West. They included: Passivus, bishop of Fermo; Cassius, bishop of Narni; Aetherius, bishop of Vienne; Aquilinus, bishop of Évreux; Faron, bishop of Meaux; Magnus, bishop of Avignon. Filibaud, bishop of Aire-sur-l'Adour, was the father of Philibert de Jumièges, and Sigilaicus, bishop of Tours, was the father of Cyran of Brenne. No statement is made about whether they had children after becoming bishops or only before.

"A famous letter of Synesius of Cyrene (d. c. 414) is evidence both for the respecting of personal decision in the matter and for contemporary appreciation of celibacy. For priests and deacons clerical marriage continued to be in vogue".

The consequence of the requirement from higher clerics who lived in marriages to abstain permanently from sexual intercourse with their wives was prohibition for those who were single of entering a marriage after ordination. The Apostolic Canons of the Apostolic Constitutions decreed that only lower clerics might still marry after their ordination. Bishops, priests, and deacons were not allowed.

=== Fourth century ===
The Council of Elvira (306) is often seen as the first to issue a written regulation requiring clergy to abstain from sexual intercourse. Its canon 33 decreed: "Bishops, presbyters, deacons, and others with a position in the ministry are to abstain completely from sexual intercourse with their wives and from the procreation of children. If anyone disobeys, he shall be removed from the clerical office." It is disputed whether this canon mandated permanent continence or only, as is the practice in the Eastern Orthodox Church even for the laity, periodical continence before partaking of the Eucharist. and Maurice Meigne even interpreted it as meaning: "It was decided to forbid keeping back from one's wife and not producing children".

In 387 or 390, or according to others in 400, a Council of Carthage decreed that bishops, priests and deacons abstain from conjugal relations: "It is fitting that the holy bishops and priests of God as well as the Levites, i.e. those who are in the service of the divine sacraments, observe perfect continence, so that they may obtain in all simplicity what they are asking from God; what the Apostles taught and what antiquity itself observed, let us also endeavour to keep... It pleases us all that bishop, priest and deacon, guardians of purity, abstain from conjugal intercourse with their wives, so that those who serve at the altar may keep a perfect chastity."

The Directa Decretal of Pope Siricius (385) states: "We have indeed discovered that many priests and deacons of Christ brought children into the world, either through union with their wives or through shameful intercourse. And they used as an excuse the fact that in the Old Testament—as we can read—priests and ministers were permitted to beget children." Two other Papal decrees of the time, Cum in Unum and Dominus Inter, demanded an end to the "scandal" of priests failing to uphold perpetual sexual abstinence, and rejected the claim that St. Paul had permitted priests to remain married by declaring that Paul only meant to disbar polygamists. Both decrees described continence as an ancient obligation from scripture and the tradition of the Church fathers.

Hilary of Poitiers (315–368), a Doctor of the Church, was a married bishop and had a daughter named Apra, who was baptized together with her father, when he and his wife became Christians. Among Popes of the 4th, 5th and 6th centuries, the father of Pope Damasus I (366–384) was a bishop. Pope Felix III (483–492), whose father was almost certainly a priest, was the great-great-grandfather of Pope Gregory I the Great (590–604). Pope Hormisdas (514–523) was the father of Pope Silverius (536–537). No statement is given on whether, among these, the children in question were born when their fathers were still laymen.

As for the East, the Greek ecclesiastical historians Socrates and Sozomen, who wrote a century after the event, reported that the First Council of Nicaea (325) considered ordering all married clergy to refrain from conjugal relations, but the Council was dissuaded by Paphnutius of Thebes.

According to Sozomen's history:

While [the bishops at Nicaea] were deliberating about this, some thought that a law ought to be passed enacting that bishops and presbyters, deacons and subdeacons, should hold no intercourse with the wife they had espoused before they entered the priesthood; but Paphnutius, the confessor, stood up and testified against this proposition; he said that marriage was honorable and chaste, and that cohabitation with their own wives was chastity, and advised the Synod not to frame such a law, for it would be difficult to bear, and might serve as an occasion of incontinence to them and their wives; and he reminded them, that according to the ancient tradition of the church, those who were unmarried when they took part in the communion of sacred orders, were required to remain so, but that those who were married, were not to put away their wives. Such was the advice of Paphnutius, although he was himself unmarried, and in accordance with it, the Synod concurred in his counsel, enacted no law about it, but left the matter to the decision of individual judgment, and not to compulsion.

The Council of Nicaea, AD 325, decides in Canon 3:

The great Synod has stringently forbidden any bishop, presbyter, deacon, or any one of the clergy whatever, to have a subintroducta dwelling with him, except only a mother, or sister, or aunt, or such persons only as are beyond all suspicion.

The term subintroducta refers to an unmarried woman living in association with a man in a merely spiritual marriage, a practice that seems to have existed already in the time of Hermas; in the 4th century such a woman was also referred to as an agapeta. Stefan Heid has argued that the pre-Nicaean acceptance of that arrangement for clerics was an indication that the clergy were expected to live in continence even with their wives.

A leading participant in the Council, Eusebius of Caesarea, wrote: "It is fitting that those in the priesthood and occupied in the service of God, should abstain after ordination from the intercourse of marriage."

Epiphanius of Salamis (died 403) accused the heretics whom he called "Purists" of "mixing up everyone's duty":

They have assumed that what is enjoined upon the priesthood because of the priesthood's preeminence applies equally to everyone. They have heard, "The bishop must be blameless, the husband of one wife, continent; likewise the deacon and the presbyter", but not understood the limitation of the ordinances. [...] She (God's holy church) does not accept the husband of one wife if he is still co-habiting with her and fathering children. She does accept the abstinent husband of one wife, or the widower, as a deacon, presbyter, bishop and subdeacon, [but no other married men], particularly where the canons of the church are strictly observed. But in some places, you will surely tell me, presbyters, deacons and sub-deacons are still fathering children [while exercising their office.] This is not canonical, but is due to men's occasional remissness of purpose, and because there is no one to serve the congregation.

Similar evidence of the existence in the 4th-century East, as in the West, of a rule or at least an ideal of clerical continence for bishops that was considered to be canonical is found in Epiphanius's Panarion, 48, 9 and Expositio Fidei, 21. Synesius (died c. 414), who refused to be bound by the obligation, knew that, if made a bishop, he was expected to live in continence with his wife. One of the accusations against Antoninus, Bishop of Ephesus, in his trial before John Chrysostom was that "after separating from his married wife, he had taken her again". In his note on this phrase, the translator Herbert Moore says: "According to the 'Apostolic Canons', only the lower orders of clergy were allowed to marry after their appointment to office; the Council in Trullo ordered that a bishop's wife should retire to a convent, or become a deaconess; that of Neo-Caesarea, that if a priest marries after ordination he must be degraded. For Antoninus to resume relations with his wife was equivalent to marriage after ordination. It was proposed at the Council of Nicaea that married clergy should be compelled to separate from their wives, but the proposal was rejected; though it was generally held that the relations of bishops with their wives should be those of brother and sister."

The 4th-century Church Fathers Ambrose and Jerome argued that the passage in 1 Timothy 3:2–4 did not conflict with the discipline they knew, whereby a married man who became a bishop was to abstain from sexual relations and not marry again: "He speaks of having children, not of begetting them, or marrying again"; "He does not say: Let a bishop be chosen who marries one wife and begets children; but who marries one wife, and has his children in subjection and well disciplined. You surely admit that he is no bishop who during his episcopate begets children. The reverse is the case—if he be discovered, he will not be bound by the ordinary obligations of a husband, but will be condemned as an adulterer."

According to Epiphanius of Salamis, also of the 4th century, Nicholas, one of the Seven Deacons of Acts 6:1–6, noticed others being admired for their celibacy. To avoid seeming immoderately devoted to his beautiful wife and therefore inferior in his ministry, he renounced conjugal intercourse forever. While he was able to remain continent for a while, eventually his burning desire overpowered him. However, he did not want to be regarded as inconsistent or seen as taking his oath lightly. Instead of returning to his wife, he engaged in promiscuous sex and what Epiphanius termed "sex practices against nature". In this way, he started Nicolaism, an antinomian heresy which believed that as long as they abstained from marriage, it was not a sin to exercise their sexual desires as they pleased. Revelation 2:6 and 15 expresses hatred for the "works of the Nicolaitans".

Jerome, referred in Against Jovinianus to marriage prohibition for priests when he argued that Peter and the other apostles had been married, but had married before they were called and subsequently gave up their marital relations. The Paphnutius legend in the first half of the 5th century called the marriage prohibition an ancient ecclesiastical tradition. In Against Vigilantius, Jerome testified that the Churches of the East, Egypt and of the Apostolic See "accept for the ministry only men who are virgins, or those who practice continency, or, if married, abandon their conjugal rights"

=== Fifth to seventh centuries ===
In saying that "in certain provinces it is permitted to the readers and singers to marry", the Council of Chalcedon (451) suggests that, in other provinces, not only bishops, priests, deacons and subdeacons, but even those in the lower orders of readers and singers were at that time not permitted to marry.

According to Gregory of Tours, Namatius a 5th-century bishop of Clermont was married and his wife was involved in the construction of St Stephen's church in Clermont.

Needless to say, the rule or ideal of clerical continence was not always observed either in the West or in the East, and it was because of violations that it was from time to time affirmed. Emperor Justinian I (died 565) ordered that "sacred canons permit neither the pious presbyter, nor the devoted deacons or subdeacons to contract marriage after their ordination". If they, "in disregard of the sacred canons, have children by women with whom, according to sacerdotal regulation, they may not cohabit" their children would be considered illegitimate on the same level as those "procreated in incest and in nefarious nuptials", while the clergy would be "deprived of their priesthood, their sacred ministry and the dignity itself which they hold." As for bishops, he forbade "any one to be ordained bishop who has children or grandchildren".

Canon 13 of the Quinisext Council (Constantinople, 692) shows that by that time there was a direct contradiction between the ideas of East and West about the legitimacy of conjugal relations on the part of clergy lower than the rank of bishop who had married before being ordained:

Since we know it to be handed down as a rule of the Roman Church that those who are deemed worthy to be advanced to the diaconate or presbyterate should promise no longer to cohabit with their wives, we, preserving the ancient rule and apostolic perfection and order, will that the lawful marriages of men who are in holy orders be from this time forward firm, by no means dissolving their union with their wives nor depriving them of their mutual intercourse at a convenient time. Wherefore, if anyone shall have been found worthy to be ordained subdeacon, or deacon, or presbyter, he is by no means to be prohibited from admittance to such a rank, even if he shall live with a lawful wife. Nor shall it be demanded of him at the time of his ordination that he promise to abstain from lawful intercourse with his wife: lest we should affect injuriously marriage constituted by God and blessed by his presence.

The canon mistakenly claims that the canon of the late-4th-century Council of Carthage quoted above excluded conjugal intercourse by clergy lower than bishops only in connection with their liturgical service or in times of fasting. The Council of Carthage excluded such intercourse perpetually and made no distinction between bishops, priests and deacons.

There have been no changes since then in the discipline of the Eastern Orthodox Church, which for bishops, priests, deacons, and subdeacons excludes marriage after ordination, but allows, except for periods before celebrating the Divine Liturgy, conjugal relations by priests and deacons married before ordination, and requires celibacy and perpetual continence only of bishops.

The last married Pope was Adrian II (r. 867–872), who was married to Stephania, with whom he had a daughter. He was married before his ordination, and was elected Pope only in old age.

=== 11th and 12th centuries ===
In 888, two local councils, that of Metz and that of Mainz, prohibited cohabitation even with wives living in continence. This tendency was taken up by the 11th-century Gregorian Reform, which aimed at eliminating what it called "Nicolaitism", that is clerical marriage, which in spite of being theoretically excluded was in fact practised, and concubinage.

The First Lateran Council (1123), a General Council, adopted the following canons:

Canon 3: We absolutely forbid priests, deacons, and subdeacons to associate with concubines and women, or to live with women other than such as the Nicene Council (canon 3) for reasons of necessity permitted, namely, the mother, sister, or aunt, or any such person concerning whom no suspicion could arise. Canon 21: We absolutely forbid priests, deacons, subdeacons, and monks to have concubines or to contract marriage. We decree in accordance with the definitions of the sacred canons, that marriages already contracted by such persons must be dissolved, and that the persons be condemned to do penance.

The phrase "contract marriage" in the first part of canon 21 excludes clerical marriages, and the marriages that the second part says must be dissolved may possibly be such marriages, contracted after ordination, not before. Canon 3 makes reference to a rule made at the First Council of Nicaea (see above), which is understood as not forbidding a cleric to live in the same house with a wife whom he married before being ordained.

Sixteen years later, the Second Lateran Council (1139), in which some five hundred bishops took part, enacted the following canons:

Canon 6: We also decree that those who in the subdiaconate and higher orders have contracted marriage or have concubines, be deprived of their office and ecclesiastical benefice. For since they should be and be called the temple of God, the vessel of the Lord, the abode of the Holy Spirit, it is unbecoming that they indulge in marriage and in impurities. Canon 7: Following in the footsteps of our predecessors, the Roman pontiffs Gregory VII, Urban, and Paschal, we command that no one attend the masses of those who are known to have wives or concubines. But that the law of continence and purity, so pleasing to God, may become more general among persons constituted in sacred orders, we decree that bishops, priests, deacons, subdeacons, canons regular, monks, and professed clerics (conversi) who, transgressing the holy precept, have dared to contract marriage, shall be separated. For a union of this kind which has been contracted in violation of the ecclesiastical law, we do not regard as matrimony. Those who have been separated from each other, shall do penance commensurate with such excesses.

This Council thus declared clerical marriages not only illicit though valid, as before, but invalid ("we do not regard as matrimony"). The marriages in question are, again, those contracted by men who already are "bishops, priests, deacons, subdeacons, canons regular, monks and professed clerics". And later legislation, found especially in the Quinque Compilationes Antiquae and the Decretals of Gregory IX, continued to deal with questions concerning married men who were ordained legally. In 1322, Pope John XXII insisted that no one bound in marriage—even if unconsummated—could be ordained unless there was full knowledge of the requirements of church law. If the free consent of the wife had not been obtained, the husband, even if already ordained, was to be reunited with his wife, exercise of his ministry being barred. Accordingly, the assumption that a wife might not want to give up her marital rights may have been one of the factors contributing to the eventual universal practice in the Latin Church of ordaining only unmarried men.

However, although the decrees of the Second Council of the Lateran might still be interpreted in the older sense of prohibiting marriage only after ordination, they came to be understood as absolute prohibitions, and, while the fact of being married was formally made a canonical impediment to ordination in the Latin Church only with the 1917 Code of Canon Law, the prohibition of marriage for all clerics in major orders began to be taken simply for granted. The Second Lateran Council is thus often cited as having for the first time introduced a general law of celibacy, requiring ordination only of unmarried men. Somewhat inaccurately, since several of the Eastern Catholic Churches allow married men to be ordained (though not to be consecrated as bishops), the New Catholic Encyclopedia states: "The Second Lateran Council (1139) seems to have enacted the first written law making sacred orders a diriment impediment to marriage for the universal Church.".

=== 16th century ===
While the 11th-century Gregorian Reform's campaign against clerical marriage and concubinage met strong opposition, by the time of the Second Council of the Lateran it had won widespread support from lay and ecclesiastical leaders.

New opposition appeared in connection with the Protestant Reformation, not only on the part of the Reformers, but also among churchmen and others who remained in union with the see of Rome. Figures such as Panormitanus, Erasmus, Thomas Cajetan, and the Holy Roman Emperors Charles V, Ferdinand I and Maximilian II argued against it.

In practice, the discipline of clerical continence meant by then that only unmarried men were ordained. Thus, in the discussions that took place, no distinction was made between clerical continence and clerical celibacy.

The Reformers made abolition of clerical continence and celibacy a key element in their reform. They denounced it as opposed to the New Testament recommendation that a cleric should be "the husband of one wife" (see on 1 Timothy 3:2–4 above), the declared right of the apostles to take around with them a believing Christian as a wife (1 Corinthians 9:5) and the admonition, "Marriage should be honoured by all" (Hebrews 13:4). They blamed it for widespread sexual misconduct among the clergy.

Against the long-standing tradition of the Church in the East as well as in the West, which excluded marriage after ordination, Zwingli married in 1522, Luther in 1525, and Calvin in 1539. And against what had also become, though seemingly at a later date, a tradition in both East and West, the married Thomas Cranmer was made Archbishop of Canterbury in 1533.

The Council of Trent considered the matter and at its twenty-fourth session decreed that marriage after ordination was invalid: "If any one saith, that clerics constituted in sacred orders, or Regulars, who have solemnly professed chastity, are able to contract marriage, and that being contracted it is valid, notwithstanding the ecclesiastical law, or vow; and that the contrary is no thing else than to condemn marriage; and, that all who do not feel that they have the gift of chastity, even though they have made a vow thereof, may contract marriage; let him be anathema: seeing that God refuses not that gift to those who ask for it rightly, neither does He suffer us to be tempted above that which we are able".

It also decreed, concerning the relative dignity of marriage and celibacy: "If any one saith, that the marriage state is to be placed above the state of virginity, or of celibacy, and that it is not better and more blessed to remain in virginity, or in celibacy, than to be united in matrimony; let him be anathema."

== Rules for Christian clergy ==
Rules on celibacy differ between different religious traditions and churches:

- In the Church of Sweden, a Lutheran Church, the vow of clerical celibacy, along with those to a motherhouse, and to a life of poverty, was required of deacons/deaconesses until the 1960s; this vow of celibacy was dropped and deacons/deaconesses in the Church of Sweden may be married.
- In the Latin (Western) Catholic Church, since the Second Vatican Council mature married men who intend not to advance to priesthood may be ordained deacons and are referred to as "permanent deacons", but married men may not be ordained priests or bishops or even as "transitional deacons", nor may anyone marry after ordination. Since the start of the pontificate of Pope Pius XII (1939–1958), exceptions may be allowed for married Protestant ministers, including Lutheran or Anglican clergy, who convert to Catholicism and wish to become priests in the Catholic Church, provided their wives consent. The Catholic Church considers Protestant, including most Anglican ordinations invalid, while recognizing Eastern Orthodox, Oriental Orthodox. In some cases, laicized Catholic priests are allowed to marry by special dispensation. Additionally, dispensations can be granted for deacons whose wives have died to marry a second time, especially if they have young children to look after.
- In Eastern Orthodox Churches, and Eastern Catholic Churches (which latter are in full communion with Rome), married men may be ordained to any order except as bishops, and one may not marry after ordination as a subdeacon. The Oriental Orthodox churches follow the same rules as in the Eastern Orthodox Church for bishops and priests, but the Armenian Apostolic Church, the Ethiopian Orthodox Tewahedo Church, the Malankara Orthodox Syrian Church, and the Syriac Orthodox Church permit ordained deacons to marry, while the Coptic Orthodox Church of Alexandria does not allow it. For much of the 5th century, the Church of the East allowed even bishops to marry, but in the early 6th century decided to ordain only celibate monks to episcopacy, while still allowing priests to marry after ordination. While some incorrectly believe all Orthodox bishops must be monks, in fact, according to church law, they simply may no longer be living with their wives if they are to be consecrated to the episcopacy. (The canons stipulate that they must also see to their wives' maintenance, for example Canon 12 of the Quinisext Council.) Typically, the wife of such a man will take up the monastic life herself, though this also is not required. There are many Orthodox bishops currently serving who have never been tonsured (formally initiated) to monastic orders. There are also many who are tonsured monastics but have never formally lived the monastic life. Further, a number of bishops are widowers, but because clergy cannot remarry after ordination, such a man must remain celibate after the death of his wife. The Holy See's 1929 decree Cum data fuerit, forbidding priestly ordination and ministry of married men in certain diaspora areas outside the home territories of the Eastern Catholic Churches, was revoked by a decree of June 2014.
- Churches of the Anglican Communion have no restrictions on the marriage of deacons, priests, bishops, or other ministers to a person of the opposite sex. Early Anglican Church clergy under Henry VIII were required to be celibate (see Six Articles), but the requirement was eliminated by Edward VI. Some Anglo-Catholic priestly orders require their members to remain celibate, as do monastic orders of all religiously professed brothers and sisters.
- Most other Protestant traditions have no restrictions on the marriage of ministers or other clergy, except that in some circles divorced persons may not serve as pastors, and in practice the large majority of pastors are married
- Members of the Church of Jesus Christ of Latter-day Saints reject lifelong clerical celibacy. All worthy males can receive a priesthood office beginning with that of deacon in the year that they turn 12 years of age. A young man is usually encouraged to delay marriage until after he has been ordained an elder and served two years as a full-time missionary for his church. Generally, only married men are called to be bishops (who preside over local congregations designated as wards), and marriage in the temple and faithfulness to it are seen as necessary for salvation in the highest heaven. All Latter-day Saints, including members of the priesthood, are expected to entirely abstain from unchaste conduct

== Other religions ==
- In Hinduism, priests can marry. At the same time, monks in Hindu monasteries and saddhus or individual ascetics, are usually expected to withdraw from saṃsāra ('the world'), and practice celibacy. The idea is to keep the mind free from distraction caused by sex-life and use that focus in serving God.
- The traditions of monasticism within Buddhism require celibacy. Several cultures, in particular American Zen traditions, have revised this and now have forms of married lay teachers, who are distinct from the celibate clergy. Moreover, in the countries of Southeast Asia practicing Theravada Buddhism, a tradition exists of young men becoming ordained as monks for brief periods (typically a few weeks and generally no more than a year) upon completing education, but then leaving monastic life, and continuing to return to the monastery for short periods of reflection even after marriage (if the wife consents). Many Japanese monks and priests were celibate up to the time of the Meiji Restoration.
- In Jainism, monks do not marry from the day they enter Jain monasticism.
- Judaism has no history of celibacy for its leaders, including rabbis and kohanim. Before the destruction of the Jerusalem temple, priests (kohanim) and Levites were required to practice continence (abstain from sexual intercourse with their wives) before and during their time of service at the temple. They were permitted to resume marital relations after completing their service. Some community functions are, as a rule, filled only by married men. Marriage is encouraged for everyone and men are obligated to have children.
- In Islam, lifelong celibacy or monasticism is forbidden. Marriage is encouraged for everyone.

== The Catholic Church today ==
Celibacy is represented in the Catholic Church as having apostolic authority. Theologically, the church desires to imitate the life of Jesus with regard to chastity and the sacrifice of married life for the "sake of the Kingdom" (Luke 18:28–30, Matthew 19:27–30; Mark 10:20–21), and to follow the example of Jesus Christ in being "married" to the church, viewed by Catholicism and many Christian traditions as the "Bride of Christ". Also of importance are the teachings of Paul that chastity is the superior state of life, and his desire expressed in 1 Corinthians 7:7–8, "I would that all men were even as myself [celibate]—but every one has his proper gift from God; one after this manner, and another after that. But I say to the unmarried and the widows. It is good for them if they so continue, even as I."

Practically speaking, the reasons for celibacy are given by the Apostle Paul in 1 Corinthians 7:7–8; 32–35: "But I would have you to be without solicitude. He that is without a wife is solicitous for the things that belong to the Lord, how he may please God. But he that is with a wife, is solicitous for the things of the world, how he may please his wife: and he is divided. And the unmarried woman and the virgin thinketh on the things of the Lord, that she may be holy both in body and spirit. But she that is married thinketh on the things of this world how she may please her husband. And this I speak for your profit, not to cast a snare upon you, but for that which is decent and which may give you power to attend upon the Lord without impediment."

1 Corinthians 9:5 is sometimes cited by those opposed to mandatory clerical celibacy, as the verse is often rendered as referring to the Apostles carrying "wives" with them. Even apart from disputes about the significance of the word translated as "wives", this passage is of doubtful relevance to the rule of celibacy for priests of the Latin Church, which was introduced much later and is seen only as a discipline within that particular church alone, not a doctrine binding all: in other words, a church regulation, but not an integral part of church teaching. Peter, the first pope, as well as many subsequent popes, bishops, and priests during the church's first 270 years were in fact married men, and often fathers of children. The practice of clerical continence, along with a prohibition of marriage after ordination as a deacon, priest or bishop, is traceable from the time of the Council of Elvira of approximately 305–306. This law was reinforced in the Directa Decretal (385) and at the Council of Carthage in 390. The tradition of clerical continence developed into a practice of clerical celibacy (ordaining only unmarried men) from the 11th century onward among Latin Church Catholics and became a formal part of canon law in 1917. This law of clerical celibacy does not apply to Eastern Catholics. Until recently, the Eastern Catholic bishops of North America would generally ordain only unmarried men, for fear that married priests would create scandal. Since Vatican II's call for the restoration of Eastern Catholic traditions, a number of bishops have returned to the traditional practice of ordaining married men to the presbyterate. Bishops are still celibate and normally chosen from the ranks of ordained monks.

In the Latin Church exceptions are sometimes made. After the Second Vatican Council a general exception was made for the ordination as deacons of men of at least thirty-five years of age who are not intended to be ordained later as priests and whose wives consent to their ordination. Since the time of Pope Pius XII individual exceptions are sometimes made for former non-Catholic clergymen. Under the rules proposed for personal ordinariates for former Anglicans, the ordinary may request the Pope to grant authorization, on a case-by-case basis, for admission to ordination in the Catholic Church of married former Anglican clergy (see Personal ordinariate#Married former Anglican clergy and rules on celibacy).

Because the rule of clerical celibacy is a law and not a doctrine, exceptions can be made, and it can, in principle, be changed at any time by the Pope. Both Pope Benedict XVI and Pope John Paul II spoke clearly of their understanding that the traditional practice is unlikely to change. Pope Francis, however, has called for consideration of the question of electing so-called viri probati for the ordination to the priesthood, particularly in areas like Amazonia where there is an acute shortage of priests.

=== Amazon Synod in Rome in October 2019 ===
In October 2019, many of the bishops at the Amazon Synod in Rome said that married priests should be allowed in the Roman Catholic Church. Pope Francis neglected the celibacy issue in the post-synodal documents, maintaining prior rules on celibacy for Catholic priests.

=== Historical lack of enforcement ===
Despite the Latin Church's historical practice of priestly celibacy, there have been Catholic priests throughout the centuries who have engaged in sexual relations through the practice of concubinage.

In February 2019, the Catholic Church acknowledged that the church's celibacy policy has not always been enforced and that at some point in history, the Vatican enacted secret rules to protect priests who violated their vows of celibacy. The rules even applied to Catholic clergy who fathered children by doing so as well. Some of those who were fathered by Catholic clergy also publicly came forward.

Some clergy who violated the celibacy policy, which also forbids marriage for clergy who did not convert from Protestant faiths, such as Lutheranism or Anglicanism, have also maintained their clerical status after marrying women in secret. One example was shown in the Diocese of Greensburg in Pennsylvania, where a priest maintained his clerical status after he had married a girl he impregnated. In 2012, Kevin Lee, a priest in Australia, revealed that he had maintained his clerical status after he had secretly married for a full year and that church leaders were aware of his secret marriage but disregarded the celibacy policy. The same year, it was revealed that former Los Angeles Auxiliary Bishop Gabino Zavala had privately fathered two children, who were not twins, and had "more than a passing relationship" with their mother before he resigned from his post as Auxiliary Bishop and from the Catholic clergy.

== See also ==
- Clerical marriage (clergy getting married)
- MacTaggart, Scottish surname which originally meant "son of the priest"
