= Amovibility =

Condition of some Catholic priests

Amovibility or amovability is a term used in Catholic canon law for the condition of a priest who can be removed from his parish or post by his bishop. An amovible office contrasts with a perpetual or irremovable one, from which the holder can only be removed under special circumstances.

== Position in canon law ==
The term covers most of the rectors of churches in the United States and England, as also in general and everywhere those who have charge of succursal churches or are parish assistants. Under the head of removable dignitaries, canonists generally class also vicars-general, archdeacons, and rural deans. Such an office or benefice is designated manuale, as opposed to titulare or perpetuum.

The interpretation of amovibility has caused controversy. Many canonists have argued that because the possessor of an office holds it ad nutum, he can therefore be deprived of it without cause. Otherwise, they declare, the word amovability would have no meaning. They note as exceptions, however, to this power of the bishop, cases in which he acts from open hatred, or injures the good name of the ecclesiastic, or damages the parish. Likewise, they say, if the person removed were not given another office, he could have recourse to a superior authority, as this would be equivalent to injuring his good name. These canonists also add that the bishop would sin if he removed an ecclesiastic without cause, as his action would be without a proper motive, and because frequent changes are necessarily detrimental to churches. Other canonists seem to maintain for removable rectors practically the same rights as to perpetuity, which are possessed by irremovable ecclesiastics.

Amovibility contrasts with arbitrary removal, which the Catholic Church has always condemned. It is opposed to the perpetual tenure of those benefices, for removal from which the canons require a cause expressly named in law and a formal canonical process or trial. But there may be other causes that justify a removal besides those named in the canons. A removable rector is, therefore, one who may be removed without cause expressed in law, but not without a just cause; one who may be removed without canonical process, but not without certain prescribed formalities, which are really judicial, though "extra-judicial" as regards the canons. Since, however, removable ecclesiastics have no strict and perpetual right to their offices, any revocation made by the superior ad nutum is valid, though it might be gravely illicit and reversible. In such cases recourse may be had to a superior authority, although an ordinary appeal in the strict sense is barred.

In the United States the method of procedure was laid down principally in the Second Plenary Council of Baltimore (1866) and the Roman Instructions "Quamvis" of 1878 and "Cum Magnopere" of 1884.
