= Continual prayer =

Christian religious practice

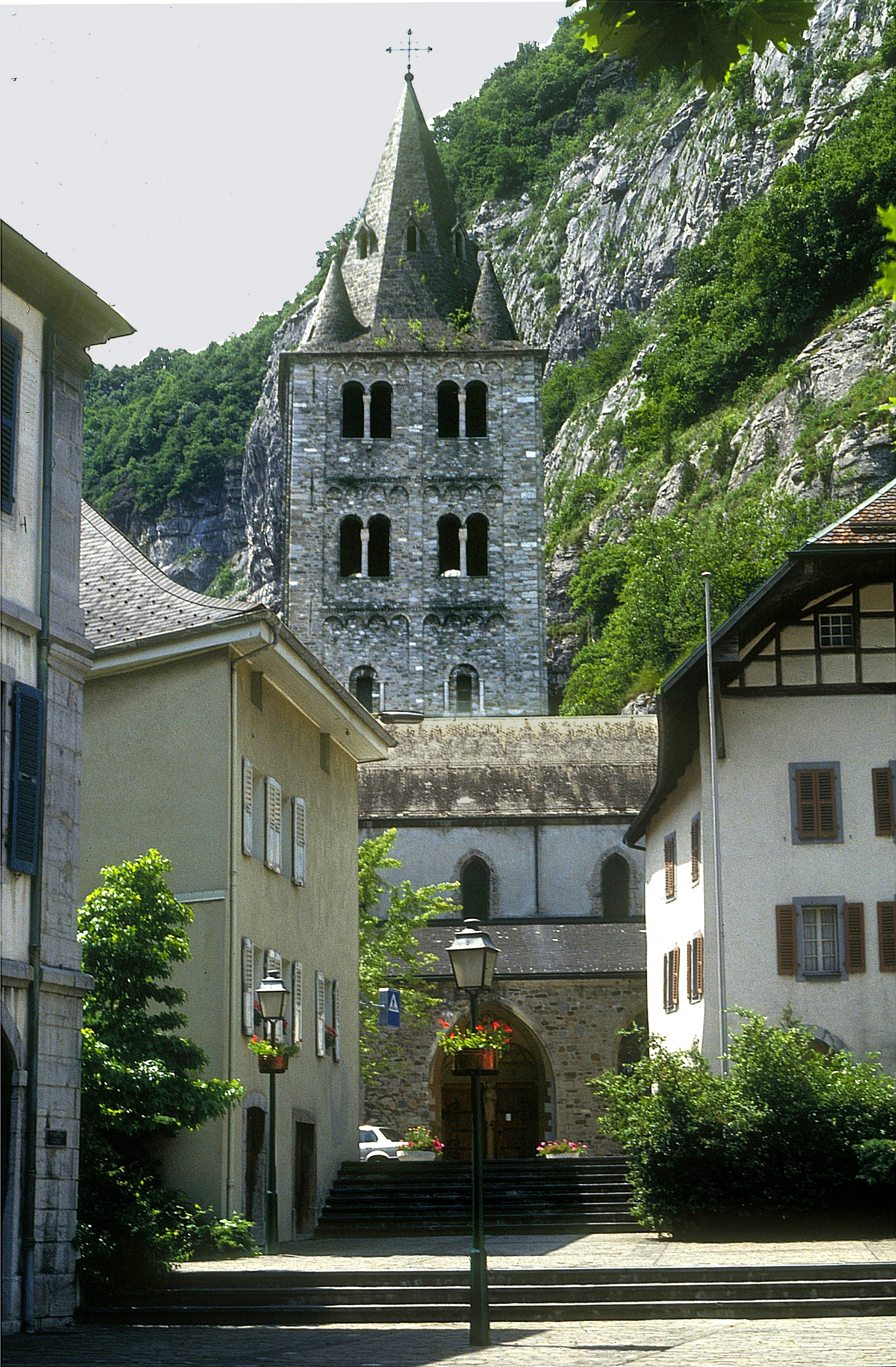
St. Maurice's Abbey bell-tower

Perpetual prayer (Latin: laus perennis) is the Christian practice of continuous prayer carried out by a group.

== History ==
The practice of continual prayer in Christianity derives its origin from the Bible in 1 Thessalonians 5:17, which states: "Pray without ceasing."

The archimandrite Alexander (died about 430), the founder of the monastic Acoemetae or "vigil-keepers", practiced continual prayer.

Laus perennis was imported to Western Europe at St. Maurice's Abbey in Agaunum, where it was carried on, day and night, by several choirs, or turmae, who succeeded each other in the recitation of the divine office, so that prayer went on without cessation. Called the Akoimetoi ("Sleepless Ones"), these monks prayed "a monastic round of twenty-four offices to fill every hour". The inauguration of laus perennis at Agaunum c. 515 was the occasion of a solemn ceremony, and of a sermon by St. Avitus which survives. The "custom of Agaunum", as it came to be called, spread over Gaul, to Lyons, Châlons, the Abbey of Saint Denis, to Luxeuil, Saint-Germain at Paris, Saint Medard at Soissons, to Saint-Riquier, and was taken up by the monks of Remiremont Abbey and Laon Abbey, though the Abbey of Agaunum had ceased to practice it from the beginning of the ninth century.

== Perpetual adoration ==
The various Roman Catholic orders of nuns dedicated to the perpetual adoration of the Blessed Sacrament may be seen as a modern variation on this theme, because in addition to the usual complete daily liturgical celebration of the Eucharist and Divine Office, these monastic communities also observe a perpetual adoration of the Blessed Sacrament, which usually involves having at least two members of the monastic community always being present in prayerful, silent contemplation of the Blessed Sacrament (i.e., a consecrated Host) exposed to view in a monstrance on the altar of the principal chapel. These monastic communities may themselves see their particular vocation as a part of a larger, more traditional monastic order, such as the Benedictine Sisters of Perpetual Adoration in Clyde, Missouri.

== Present day ==
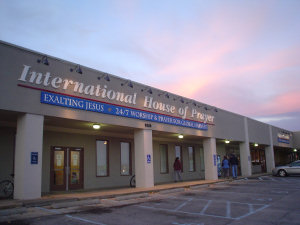
The International House of Prayer in Kansas City, Missouri, a 24-7 prayer house

The first known Protestant continuous prayer was the "Hourly Intercession" of the Moravian Brethren in Herrnhut, Saxony. Beginning in 1727, the prayer continued 24 hours a day every day uninterrupted for over 100 years. The Moravian Unity began this continuous prayer vigil anew in 1957 as part of their 500th anniversary observance.

Today, perpetual prayer is a common practice in many churches. Often the term 24-7 prayer is used to express that the prayer continues 24 hours 7 days a week. A notable example of current day perpetual prayer is the Jerusalem House of Prayer, International House of Prayer in Kansas City as well as other prayer houses such as the Justice House of Prayer that were inspired by this ministry. Many churches organize 24/7 prayer weeks that last for one or several weeks.

Also, many of the Cursillo, Walk to Emmaus and other similar Three Day and 4th Day Movements employ a similar laus perennis model during the actual retreats as 4th Day members who have already attended the events sign up for and maintain a continuous prayer clock throughout each retreat of each community with specific prayers for each new participant, or pilgrim.

== See also ==
- Eucharistic adoration
- Forty Hours' Devotion
