= Sabas of Stoudios =

Sabas of Stoudios was an abbot of the Monastery of Stoudios who played a leading role at the Second Council of Nicaea (787 AD).

== Biography ==
The Second Council of Nicaea met to restore the veneration of icons, which had been suppressed and banned by imperial edict of the Byzantine Empire. Sabas, along with Plato of Sakkoudion, was leader of a group of monks who opposed the iconoclasts—Sabas accused the Empire of interfering with the independence of the Church in the preparations for the council. Sabas was a leading candidate to preside over the council, which ended being presided over by Patriarch Tarasios. Sabas was strongly opposed to the readmission of iconoclast bishops as leaders of their sees.

The Monastery of Stoudios was considered the most important monastery in Byzantine Constantinople. As head abbot, or Hegumen, Sabas was the immediate predecessor to Theodore the Studite. Other notable Stoudios abbots included Symeon the Studite and Niketas Stethatos. It is unknown if Sabas was still alive when Theodore became abbot, and what he might have done after leaving Stoudios.
