= Studius =

Studius may refer to:

- Monastery of Stoudios, historically the most important monastery of Constantinople
- Flavius Studius (fl. 5th century AD), founder of the monastery
- Spurius Tadius, or Studius, Roman muralist of the Augustan period
- Studius, home of a castle captured in the 1453 Fall of Constantinople
