= De Colores =

Spanish language folk song

"De colores" ([Made] of Colors) is a traditional Spanish language folk song that is well known throughout the Spanish-speaking world. It is widely used in the Catholic Cursillo movement and related communities such as the Great Banquet, Chrysalis Flight, Tres Días, Walk to Emmaus, and Kairos Prison Ministry.

The song is also associated with the United Farm Workers union, as one of the most commonly heard songs during rallies.

== History and origins of the song ==
Though the song is associated with Mexican folklore, it is not known for certain when and where it originated. It has been in circulation throughout the Americas since the 16th century, with melodies brought over from Spain during the colonial era. "De Colores" shares one of its melodic lines with the chorus of Italian folk song "Bella ragazza dalle trecce bionde." Some modern lyrics are widely understood to have been created by a group of Cursillo participants in Majorca, Spain, after one of the earliest Cursillo retreats in the 1940s.

Today, in addition to being used as the unofficial anthem of the Farm Worker Movement and as an inspirational song in Cursillo workshops, the song is often taught in schools in the United States—from elementary school to community colleges—as an example of a common Mexican folk song. It frequently appears in collections of children's songs.

== Common song words ==
De colores is typically sung in Spanish, but there are different English translations of the song in circulation, and the song has been translated into other languages. The lyrics depict an expression of joy and a celebration of all creation with its many bright colors. Below are five of the most commonly heard verses. Many additional verses (and variations of these verses) are known to exist, some including Christian references and some including more specific to farm life or labor union issues to be used as a rallying-song for farm-laborers.

De colores, de colores
Se visten los campos en la primavera.
De colores, de colores
Son los pajaritos que vienen de afuera.
De colores, de colores
Es el arco iris que vemos lucir.

Y por eso los grandes amores
De muchos colores me gustan a mí.
Y por eso los grandes amores
De muchos colores me gustan a mí.

De colores, de colores
Brillantes y finos se viste la aurora.
De colores, de colores
Son los mil reflejos que el sol atesora.
De colores, de colores
Se viste el diamante que vemos lucir.

Y por eso los grandes amores
De muchos colores me gustan a mí.
Y por eso los grandes amores
De muchos colores me gustan a mí.

Canta el gallo, canta el gallo
Con el quiri, quiri, quiri, quiri, quiri.
La gallina, la gallina
Con el cara, cara, cara, cara, cara.
Los pollitos/polluelos, los pollitos/polluelos
Con el pío, pío, pío, pío, pí.

Y por eso los grandes amores
De muchos colores me gustan a mí.
Y por eso los grandes amores
De muchos colores me gustan a mí.

Jubilosos, jubilosos
Vivamos en gracia puesto que se puede.
Saciaremos, saciaremos
La sed ardorosa del Rey que no muere.
Jubilosos, jubilosos
Llevemos a Cristo un alma y mil más.

Difundiendo la luz que ilumina
La gracia divina del gran ideal.
Difundiendo la luz que ilumina
La gracia divina del gran ideal.

De colores, de colores
Sí, de blanco y negro y rojo y azul y castaño.
Son colores, son colores
De gente que ríe, y estrecha la mano.
Son colores, son colores
De gente que sabe de la libertad.

Y por eso los grandes amores
De muchos colores me gustan a mí.
Y por eso los grandes amores
De muchos colores me gustan a mí.

Translation:

Of colors, of colors
Are the fields dressed in the spring.
Of colors, of colors
Are the little birds that come from outside.
Of colors, of colors
Is the rainbow that we see shining.

And that is why
The great loves of many colors
is what I like
And that is why
The great loves of many colors
is what I like

Of colors, of colors
Brilliant and delicate is dressed the dawn.
Of colors, of colors
Are the thousand gleams the sun treasures.
Of colors, of colors
Is dressed the diamond we see shining.

And that is why
The great loves of many colors
is what I like
And that is why
The great loves of many colors
is what I like

The rooster sings, the rooster sings
With a cock-a-doodle, cock-a-doodle-doo.
The hen, the hen
With a cluck, cluck, cluck, cluck, cluck.
The chicks, the chicks
With a cheep, cheep, cheep, cheep, cheep.

And that is why
The great loves of many colors
is what I like
And that is why
The great loves of many colors
is what I like

Joyous, joyous
Let us live in grace since we can.
Let us quench, let us quench
The burning thirst of the King who does not die.
Joyous, joyous
Let us bring to Christ a soul and thousand more.

Spreading the light that illuminates
The divine grace from the great ideal.
Spreading the light that illuminates
The divine grace from the great ideal.

Of colors, of colors
Yes, black and white and red and blue and brown.
All the colors, colors
From people laughing, and shaking hands.
All the colors, colors
From people who know freedom.

And that is why
The great loves of many colors
is what I like
And that is why
The great loves of many colors
is what I like

== Recordings ==
De colores has been recorded by many different artists, including Los Lobos, Joan Baez, Raffi, Nana Mouskouri, Tish Hinojosa, Arlo Guthrie, José-Luis Orozco, Justo Lamas, Baldemar Velasquez, Tara Strong, Rachael Cantu, Pete Seeger, Ismael Rivera, Nancy Honeytree, and Tao Rodríguez-Seeger; and has been referenced in the Flobots song "Handlebars". It was featured in the 1988 movie The Milagro Beanfield War.

Part of the song was also performed in the 1989 biographical film Romero by Raúl Juliá, as Saint Óscar Romero, the Archbishop of San Salvador assassinated nine years prior, and a group of nuns. It was featured in an episode of the PBS show Let's Go Luna in between the segments "What's the Big Idea?" and "The Day of the Dead".
