= Acoemetae =

Order of Eastern Christian monks

Acoemetae (Note: "Acoemetae" was sometimes used as an appellation common to all Eastern ascetics in general who were known by the rigour of their vigils, instead of just the actual Greek or Basilian monastic order.) (also spelled Acoemeti or Akoimetoi Greek: ἀκοίμητοι, lit. 'sleepless ones') was an order of Eastern Christian (Greek or Basilian) monks who celebrated the divine service without intermission day or night. This was done by dividing the communities into choirs, which relieved each other by turn in the church. The alternating choirs came in three groups by liturgical language: Greek, Latin, and probably Syriac.

== History ==
The Acoemetae order was founded in about 425, by the monk Alexander the Acoemete. He was of noble birth, originally from the Greek archipelago, and had ties to Messalianism. Alexander was supported by the people and monks such as Hypatius of Bithynia, as well as the empress Pulcheria. He changed residence many times, once fleeing from the court of Byzantium to the desert, both from love of solitude and fear of episcopal honours. The first monastery of Acoemetae was established on the Euphrates, in the beginning of the 5th century, and soon afterwards one was founded in Constantinople, with three hundred monks. The enterprise, however, proved difficult, owing to the hostility of Patriarch Nestorius and Emperor Theodosius. Driven from the monastery of Saint Mennas which he had reared in the city, and thrown with his monks on the hospitality of Hypatius, abbot of Rufiniana, he finally succeeded in building at the mouth of the Black Sea the monastery of Gomon, where he died, about 430.

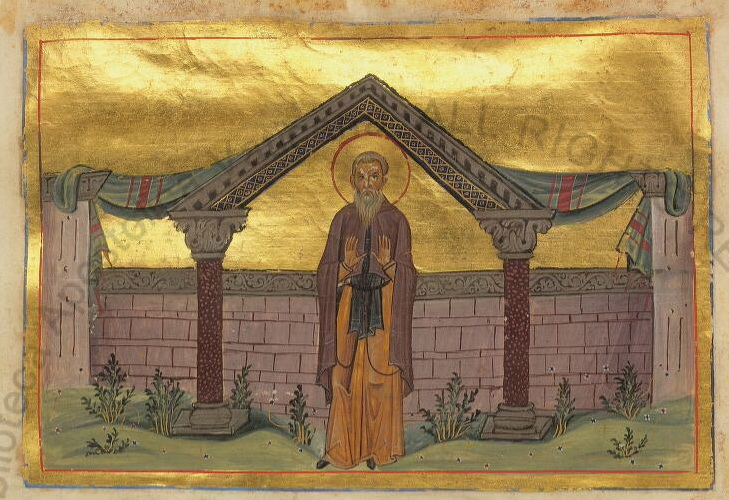
Marcellus, Abbot of Acoemetes

Alexander's successor, Abbot John, founded on the eastern shore of the Bosphorus, opposite Sosthenion, the Irenaion, always referred to in ancient documents as the "great monastery" or motherhouse of the Acoemetae. In Constantinople, under the third abbot, hegumen Marcellus, when the hostility of Patriarch and Emperor had somewhat subsided, Studius, a former consul, founded the famous Studium monastery in c. 460. Marcellus provided the first monks for the Studium in 463. The Studium was put in the hands of the Acoemetae and became their chief house, so that they were sometimes called Studites.

At Agaunum (St Maurice in the Valais) a monastery was founded by the Burgundian king Sigismund, in 515, in which the perpetual office was kept up; but it is doubtful whether this had any connexion with the Eastern Acoemetae. Later, chiefly under Abbot Theodore (759-826), the Studium became a centre of learning as well as piety, and brought to a culmination the glory of the order. On the other hand, the very glamour of the new "Studites" gradually cast into the shade the old Acoemetae. The feature that distinguished the Acoemetae from the other Basilian monks was the uninterrupted service of God. Their monasteries, which numbered hundreds of inmates and sometimes went into the thousand, were distributed in national groups, Latins, Greeks, Syrians, Egyptians; and each group into as many choirs as the membership permitted and the service required.

== Liturgy ==
With them the divine office was the literal carrying out of Psalm 119:164: "Seven times a day have I given praise to Thee," consisting as it did of seven hours: ὀρθρινόν, τρίτη, ἐκτη, ἐνάτη, λυχνικόν, πρωθύπνιον, μεσονύκτιον, which through Benedict of Nursia passed into the Western Church under the equivalent names of prime, tierce, sext, none, vespers, compline, matins (nocturns) and lauds. The influence of the Acoemetae on Christian life was considerable. The splendour of their religious services largely contributed to shape the liturgy, but their library and overall culture might have had an even bigger influence. Even before the time of the Studites, the copying of manuscripts was in honour among the Acoemetae, and the library of the "Great Monastery," consulted even by the Roman Pontiffs, is the first mentioned by the historians of Byzantium.

== Relationship with Rome ==
The Constantinopolitan Acoemetae took a prominent part in the Christological controversies of the 5th and 6th centuries; first those raised by Nestorius and Eutyches, and later, in the controversies of the Icons. At first, they strongly supported the Holy See in the schism of Acacius, patriarch of Constantinople, who attempted compromise with the monophysites. The Acoemetae supported Rome in defending the Chalcedonian Confession, but after continued to insist on the Three Chapters, their importance diminished after 534. In Justinian's reign in the sixth century, the Acoemetae fell under ecclesiastical censure for Nestorian tendencies. Consequentially, their loyalty to Rome was marred, and they were excommunicated by Pope John II. But it was considered "the error of a few" (quibusdam paucis monachis, says a contemporary document), and it could not seriously detract from the praise given their order by the Roman Synod of 484: "Thanks to your true piety towards God, to your zeal ever on the watch, and to a special gift of the Holy Ghost, you discern the just from the impious, the faithful from the miscreants, the Catholics from the heretics." The Studites supported the Holy See in the schism of Photius.

== See also ==
- Degrees of Eastern Orthodox monasticism
