= Justice House of Prayer =

Neocharismatic Christian organization based in Kansas City, Missouri

Justice House of Prayer (JHOP) is a neocharismatic Christian organization based in Kansas City, Missouri that focuses on continual prayer. It was founded by Lou Engle in 2004 and now has locations in five U.S. cities. They are in close association with the International House of Prayer-Kansas City and TheCall.

== Practices ==
Initially founded in Washington D.C. to focus on prayer for the 2004 United States presidential election, Engle credits a series of dreams and visions with inspiring him to start a house of prayer in Washington D.C. They choose to operate in locations that are considered religiously or politically liberal, rather than in more conservative parts of the country. JHOP organizers attempt to locate their buildings near areas that they deem to be spiritually significant, such as the United States Supreme Court or Harvard University.

Each location is staffed by a number of interns, also sometimes referred to as "prayer activists," who devote their time to bible study, prayer, and public demonstrations against abortion. They often stand outside of courthouses with their mouths taped shut with red tape that has the word "Life" written on it. Their silent protests are designed to represent the silence of the unborn and what they perceive to be the silence of the American church regarding the issue of abortion. JHOP members also lead prayer meetings in front of abortion clinics, and the San Diego branch attempted to pray in front of every abortion clinic in California in 2008.

Some locations also practice Street Preaching. Each location hosts regular prayer gatherings featuring harp and bowl worship, as well. They occasionally host teams of staff members from IHOP-Kansas City for prayer or evangelism initiatives. They have also raised money for children in need.

== Beliefs ==
JHOP focuses on prayer for issues such as abortion, same-sex marriage, and humanism. JHOP members often attempt to spend long hours in focused prayer for these causes, sometimes praying all night. Members also regularly practice fasting, occasionally for 40 consecutive days. Neocharismatic in theology, JHOP members often interpret dreams, speak in tongues, and claim to have occasional visions.

== Controversy ==
In 2006, a writer for the Boston LGBT newspaper Bay Windows accused JHOP of bigotry against the gay community, citing their practice of praying that same-sex marriage would not be legalized.

In 2008, a group of Christians regularly met for prayer meetings on a street in the Castro District, a largely gay neighborhood of San Francisco. In November 2008, shortly after California Proposition 8 was passed, they were so endangered, the group had to be escorted out of the Castro District under the protection of the San Francisco Police Department riot police after being surrounded by a threatening crowd drawn from nearby bars. Initial media reports did not identify the affiliation of the group, although the Justice House of Prayer later claimed that members of their San Francisco location were the group in question.
