= Retreat (spiritual) =

Period spent in reflection or solitude

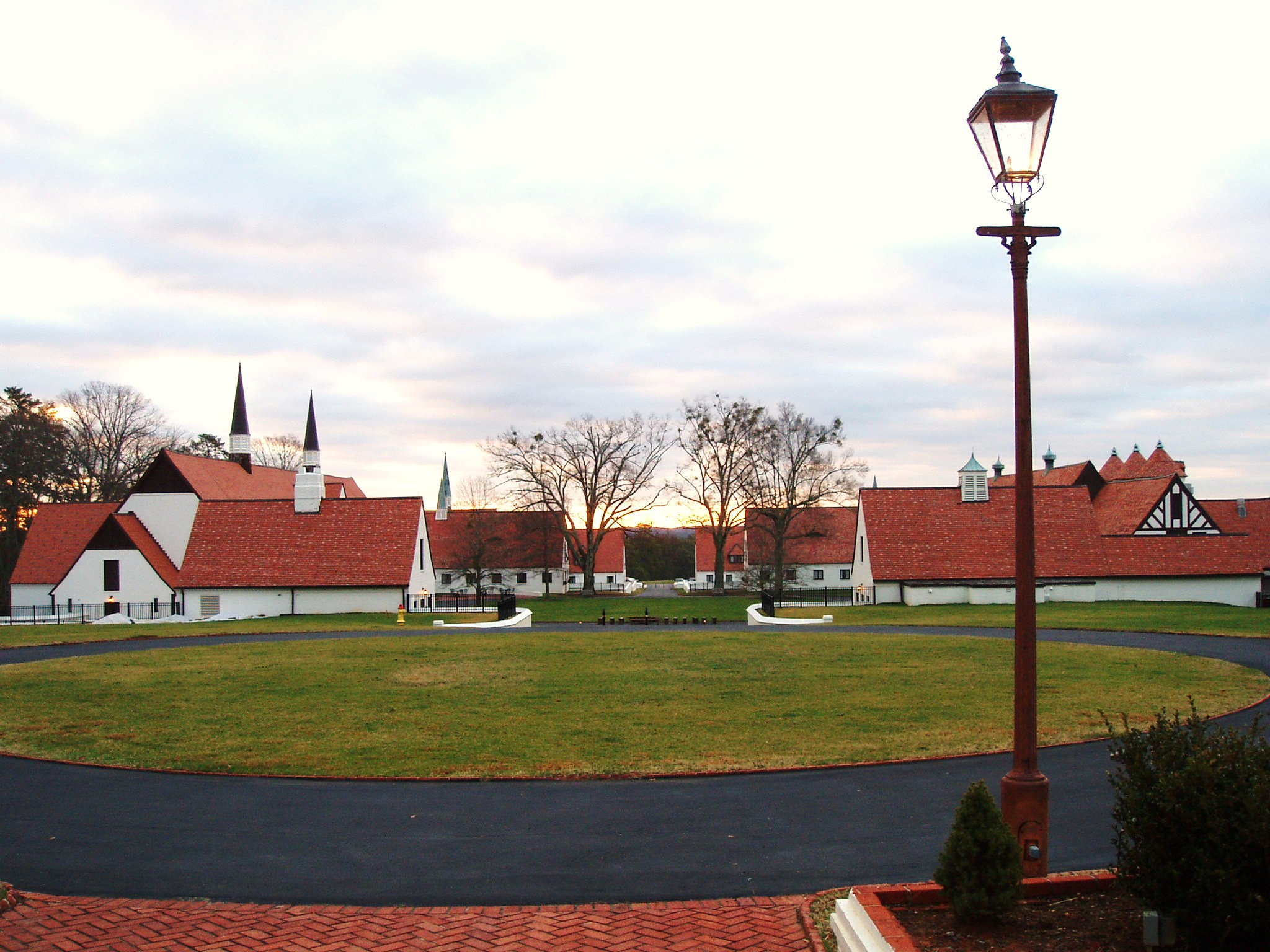
The WinShape Retreat Center in Rome, Georgia

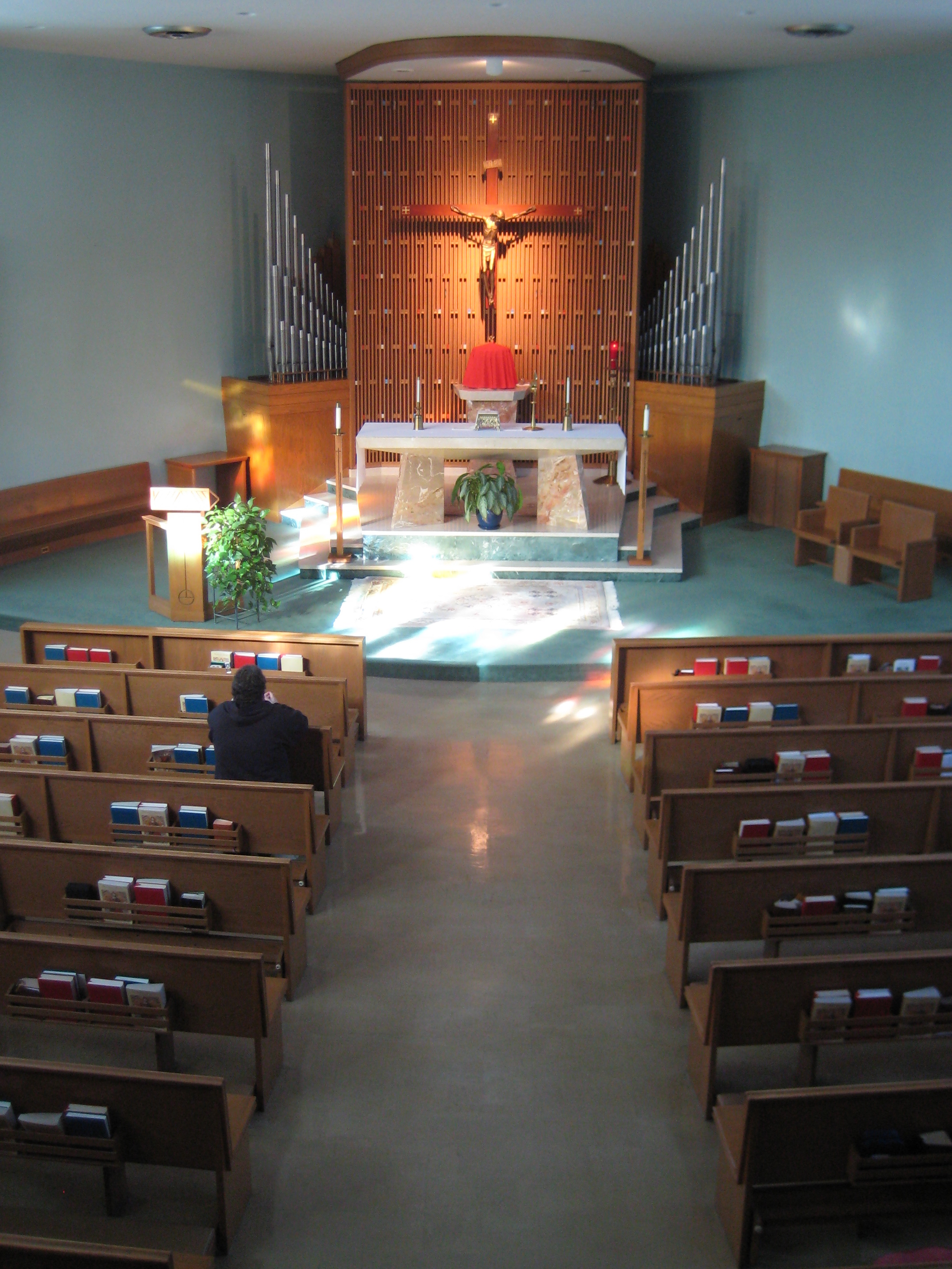
An aspiring seminarian prays during a vocational discernment retreat in the chapel of Blessed John XXIII National Seminary in Massachusetts

The meaning of a spiritual retreat can be different for different religious communities. Spiritual retreats are an integral part of many Buddhist, Christian and Sufi communities. There are many different types of spiritual retreats such as wellness retreats, mindfulness retreats, spa retreats, adventure retreats, detox retreats, yoga retreats, and religious retreats.

In Buddhism, meditative retreats are seen by some as an intimate way of deepening powers of concentration and insight.

Retreats are also popular in Christian churches, and were established in today's form by St. Ignatius of Loyola (1491–1556), in his Spiritual Exercises. Ignatius was later to be made the patron saint of spiritual retreats by Pope Pius XI in 1922. Many Protestants, Catholics and Orthodox Christians partake in and organize spiritual retreats each year.

Meditative retreats are an important practice in Sufism, the mystical path of Islam. The Sufi teacher Ibn Arabi's book Journey to the Lord of Power (Risālat al-Anwār) is a guide to the inner journey that was published over 700 years ago.

== Buddhism ==
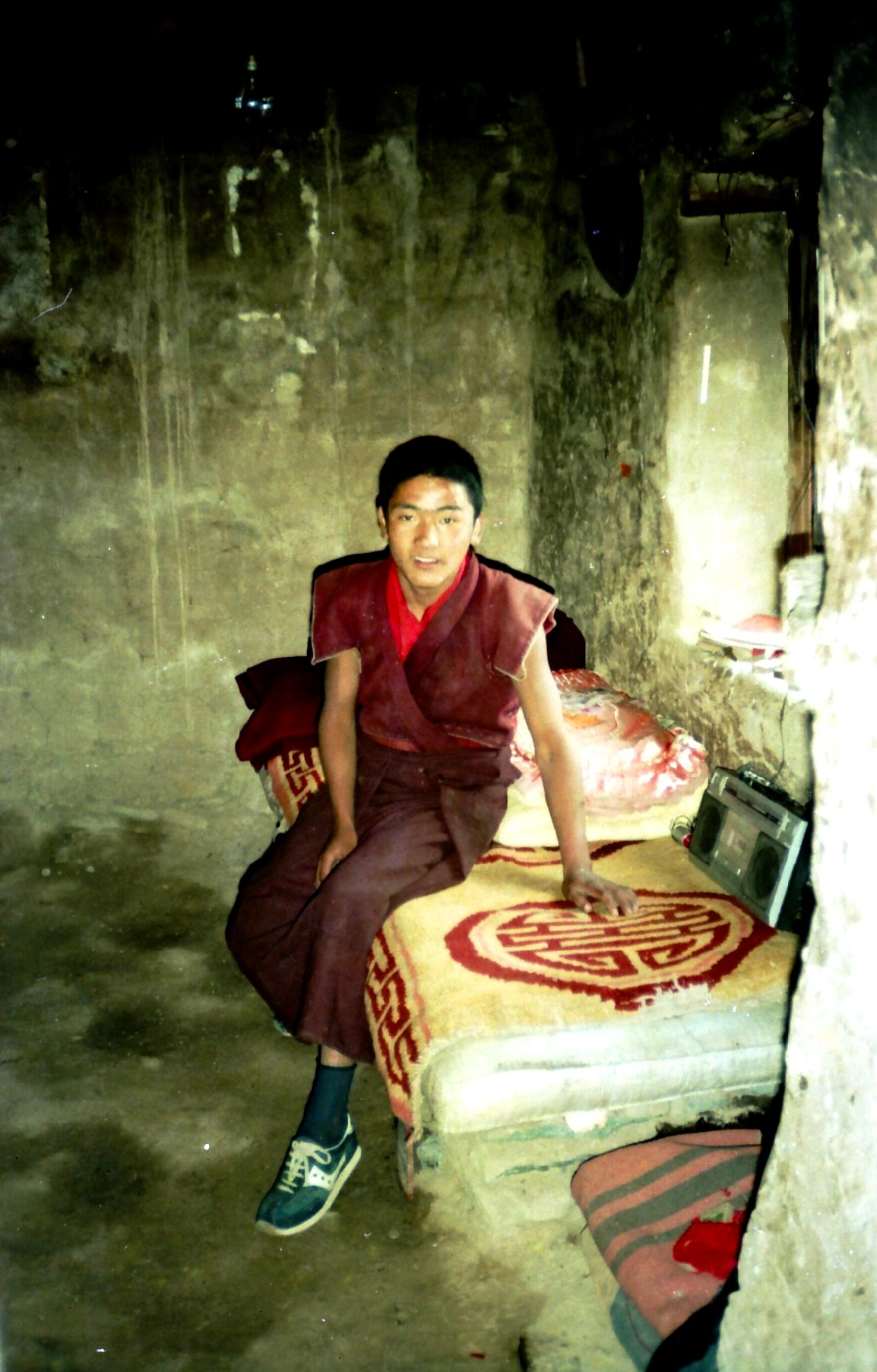
Young monk in meditation retreat, Yerpa, Tibet in 1993

A retreat can either be a time of solitude or a community experience. Some retreats are held in silence, and on others there may be a great deal of conversation, depending on the understanding and accepted practices of the host facility and/or the participant(s). Retreats are often conducted at rural or remote locations, either privately; or at a retreat centre such as a monastery. Some retreats for advanced practitioners may be undertaken in darkness, a form of retreat that is common as an advanced Dzogchen practice in the Nyingma school of Tibetan Buddhism.

Spiritual retreats allow time for reflection, prayer, or meditation. They are considered essential in Buddhism, having been a common practice since the Vassa, or rainy season retreat, was established by the founder of Buddhism, Gautama Buddha. In Zen Buddhism, retreats are known as sesshin.

== Christianity ==
=== Catholicism ===
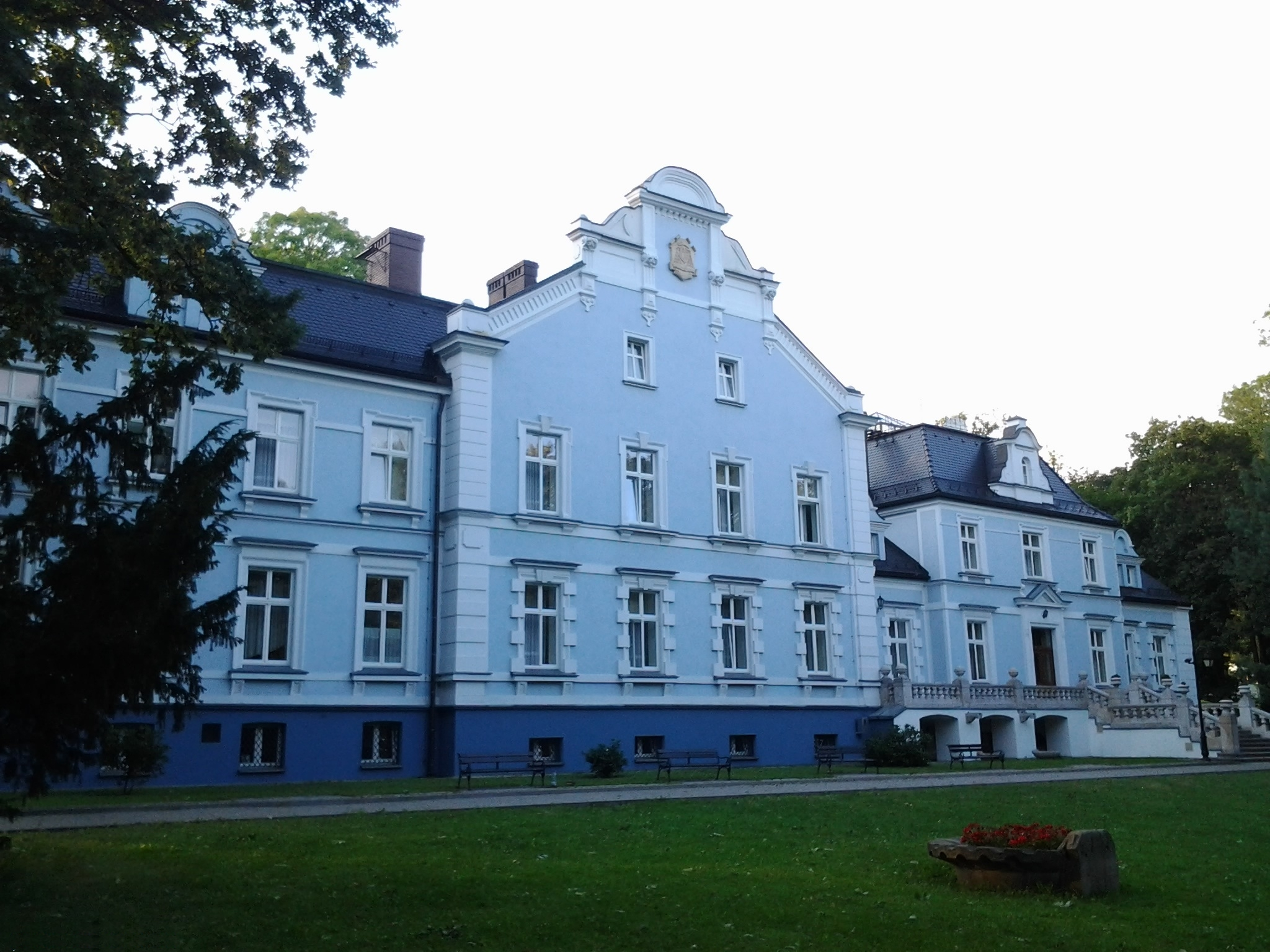
Retreat House in Wodzisław Śląski of the Archdiocese of Katowice

The Christian retreat can be defined most simply as a definite time (from a few hours in length to a month) spent away from one's normal life for the purpose of reconnecting, usually in prayer, with God. Although the practice of leaving one's everyday life to connect on a deeper level with God, be that in the desert (as with the Desert Fathers), or in a monastery, is nearly as old as Christianity itself, the practice of spending a specific time away with God is a more modern phenomenon, dating from the 1520s and St. Ignatius of Loyola's composition of the Spiritual Exercises. The fasting of Jesus in the desert for forty days is used as a biblical justification for retreats.

The retreat was popularised in Roman Catholicism by the Society of Jesus (Jesuits), whose founder, St. Ignatius of Loyola, began in the 1520s—while still a layman—to direct others in making (participating in) the exercises. Another form of the Exercises came in, which became known as the nineteenth "Observation", 'allowed continuing one's ordinary occupations with the provision of setting aside a few hours a day for this special purpose.' The spiritual exercises were intended for people wanting to live closer to God's will for their lives. In the 17th century, retreats became much more widespread in the Catholic Church.

Retreats were not originally seen as suitable for women, but in 1674, Catherine de Francheville (fr), supported by the Breton Jesuit Vincent Huby (fr), founded a retreat house for women in Vannes. This developed into a community of laywomen, who also founded a daughter house in Quimper, but were dispersed by the French Revolution. Some, however, came together to found schools, and additional communities were established in England, and later in Ireland, Belgium, the Netherlands and Italy. These developed in the course of the 19th century, under the name of La Retraite (fr), into a religious Congregation of nuns. The active involvement of the sisters in retreats was curtailed later in the 19th century, but blossomed again after the Second Vatican Council, involving among other activity an extension of the community into Chile, South Africa, Cameroon and Mali.

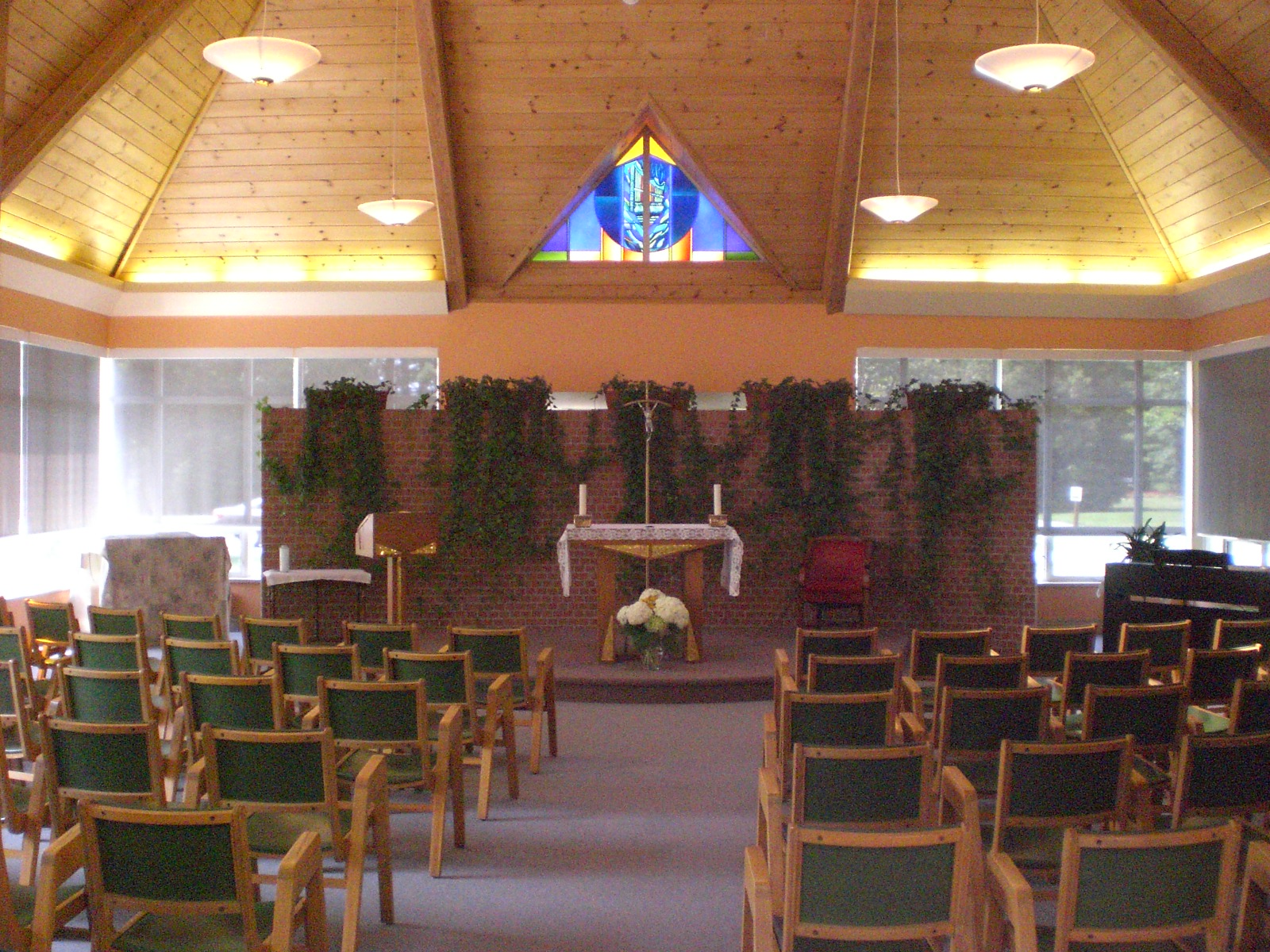
Manresa Retreat Centre, Pickering, Ontario

Following the growth of the Cursillo movement in Spain in the 20th century, similar retreats have become popular, either using licensed Cursillo material or independent material loosely based on its concepts, leading to the development of the three-day movement.

The Family Lenten Retreat is an annual three-day movement (held at the Araneta Coliseum) founded in 1983 by Msgr. Cesar B. Pagulayan and organized by Our Lady of Perpetual Help (OLPH) Parish under the Roman Catholic Diocese of Cubao.

=== Evangelical Lutheranism ===
Spiritual retreats are common in the Evangelical Lutheran branch of Christianity, with several Evangelical Lutheran monasteries and convents offering them. Östanbäck Monastery, an Evangelical Lutheran monastery in the Benedictine tradition, hosts retreats for worshippers, and Mass is celebrated there daily, along with observance of the Daily Office. In the United States, The Congregation of the Servants of Christ at Saint Augustine's House offers opportunities for Christian pilgrimage, receiving a thousand visitors each year.

=== Anglicanism ===
Spiritual retreats were introduced to the Church of England by priests of the Anglo-Catholic Society of the Holy Cross in 1856, first for clergy, and then also for laity. These retreats lasted five days. The Society of the Holy Cross's first retreats were held in secrecy. The practice was spread by Anglo-Catholic priests such as Francis Henry Murray, Alexander Forbes, and Thomas Thellusson Carter. The Oxford Movement further spread the practice of retreats to many devout men and women, borrowing from Catholic practices. Their retreats were typically 3–4 days, and featured much silence and prayer.

At the end of the 19th century, and in the first years of the 20th century, retreats began to spread among the working classes and beyond those of notable devotion. These retreats were less ascetic in character, and included more conversation and leisure. They typically lasted 1–3 days.

=== Baptists, Methodists and Pentecostals ===
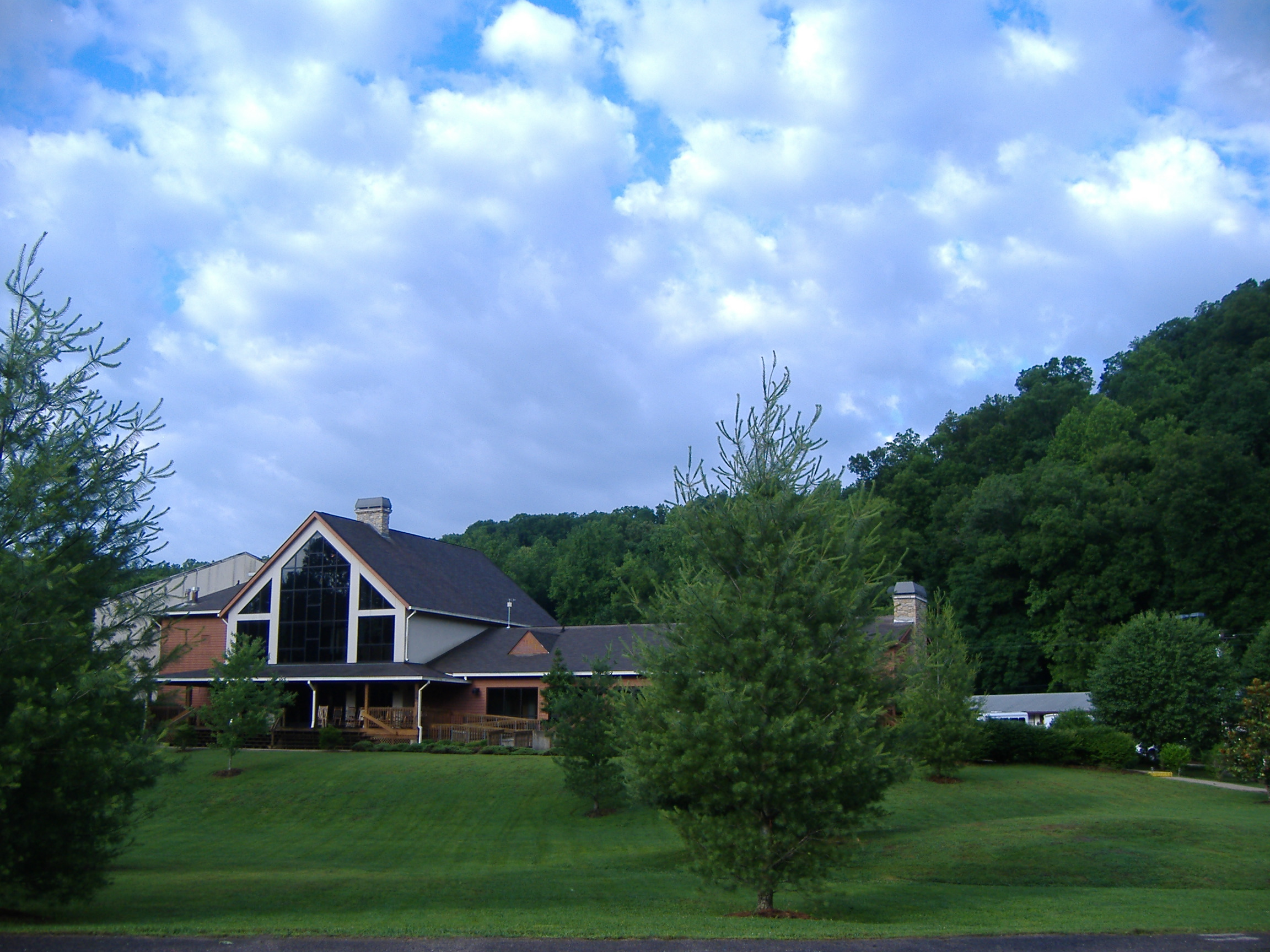
Linden Valley Baptist Conference Center in Linden, Tennessee, United States

In Evangelical Christianity, times of spiritual retreat were encouraged by the development of camp meetings of the 19th century, in order to promote spiritual renewal, far from the city and in nature. These camps were an opportunity to pray, sing and listen to sermons for several days.

Various church associations have also established campgrounds or conference centers in isolated locations, which provide retreat times for children and adults.

== Sufi retreats or spiritual khalwa ==
The translation of khalwa (from Arabic الخلوة) is seclusion or separation, but it has a different connotation in Sufi terminology, in which it refers to the act of self-abandonment in desire for the Divine Presence. In complete seclusion, the Sufi continuously repeats the name of God as the highest form of remembrance of God meditation. In his book, Journey to the Lord of Power, Muhiyid-Did ibn Arabi (1165-1240 A.D.) discussed the stages through which the Sufi passes in his khalwa.

Ibn Arabi suggested: "The Sufi should shut his door against the world for forty days and occupy himself with remembrance of Allah, that is to keep repeating, "Allah, Allah..." Then, "Almighty God will spread before him the degrees of the kingdom as a test. First, He will discover the secrets of the mineral world. If he occupies himself with dthikr, He (God) will unveil to the secrets of the vegetable world, then the secrets of the animal world, then the infusion of the world of life-force into lives, then the "surface sign" (the light of the Divine Names, according to Abdul-Karim al-Jeeli, the book's translator), then the degrees of speculative sciences, then the world of formation and adornment and beauty, then the degrees of the qutb (the soul or pivot of the universe-see #16) Then he will be given the divine wisdom and the power of symbols and authority over the veil and the unveiling. The degree of the Divine Presence is made clear to him, the garden (of Eden) and Hell are revealed to him, then the original forms of the son of Adam, the Throne of Mercy. If it is appropriate, he will know his destination. Then he will reveal to him the Pen, the First Intellect (as it is called by Sufi philosophers), then the Mover of the Pen, the right hand of the Truth. (The "Truth" as defined by al-Jeeli is that by which everything is created, none other than God most High.)

The practice of khalwah is regularly followed by the Sufis, with the permission and supervision of a Sufi authority.

The Sufis base the assigning of forty days of khalwa period on the forty days Allah had appointed for Musa (Moses) as a fasting period before speaking to him, as mentioned in different chapters in the Qur'an. One of them is from surat al-Baqarah.

Khalwa is still practised today amongst authorized Sheikhs, such as Mawlana Sheikh Nazim Al-Haqqani, Lefka, Cyprus.

== Meditation ==
Meditation courses or retreats, either in a group or solo, are a common part of many meditation traditions.

== See also ==
- The Abode of the Message
- Dark retreat
- Hermitage (religious retreat)
- Kairos (retreat)
- Simple living
