= Manuel Aparici Navarro =

Spanish Roman Catholic priest

Venerable Manuel Aparici Navarro

Priest
- Born: 11 December 1902; Madrid, Spain
- Died: 28 August 1964 (aged 61); Madrid, Spain
- Venerated in: Roman Catholic Church
- Attributes: Priest's cassock

Manuel Aparici Navarro (11 December 1902 – 28 August 1964) was a Spanish Roman Catholic priest. He exercised his pastoral mission in his home of Madrid and served as a member of Catholic Action. He focused on the motivation of the faithful in the participation of both the Sacraments and of church life.

He was proclaimed to be Venerable in 2013 on the account of his life of heroic virtue.

== Life ==
Manuel Aparici Navarro was born on 11 December 1902 in Madrid into a life of wealth. Navarro completed his studies and in 1922 entered the Customs Technical Corps by competitive examination, where he worked for years. In 1929, he abandoned his law studies and joined the Catholic Association of Propagandists (ACdP). In 1932, he became a member of Catholic Action. He served as the Youth Chairman of the Spanish Catholic Action from 1934 until 1941 during the period of persecutions of the Catholic faith during the onslaught of the Spanish Civil War. In 1936, Aparici had started the magazine Signo, with the idea of having a Catholic newspaper for youth.

In 1941, he finally left the presidency of the Catholic Action youth to enter the Seminary. He was ordained in 1947, at the age of 45. In August 1948, he organized a pilgrimage of 100,000 participants to Santiago de Compostela for the jubilee. He also served as the chaplain for the chapter from 1950 until 1959 and helped to pioneer the Cursillo Movement to help motivate the participation of the faithful in church life.

His health began to decline in 1959 and he died on 28 August 1964, The anniversary of the pilgrimage to Compostela.

== Beatification process ==
The beatification process commenced under Pope John Paul II in Madrid on 17 June 1994 which granted him the title Servant of God. The cause saw the accumulation of both documentation and witness testimonies. The process spanned from mid 1994 until 14 October 1998; the process received formal ratification on 15 October 1999 in order for the cause to proceed to the next stage.

The Positio was forwarded to the Congregation for the Causes of Saints in 2000 for further evaluation. On 27 March 2013 he was proclaimed to be Venerable after Pope Francis recognized his life of heroic virtue. The miracle needed for beatification was investigated in a local tribunal and closed on 13 October 2005.
