= Walk to Emmaus =

Christian three day movement

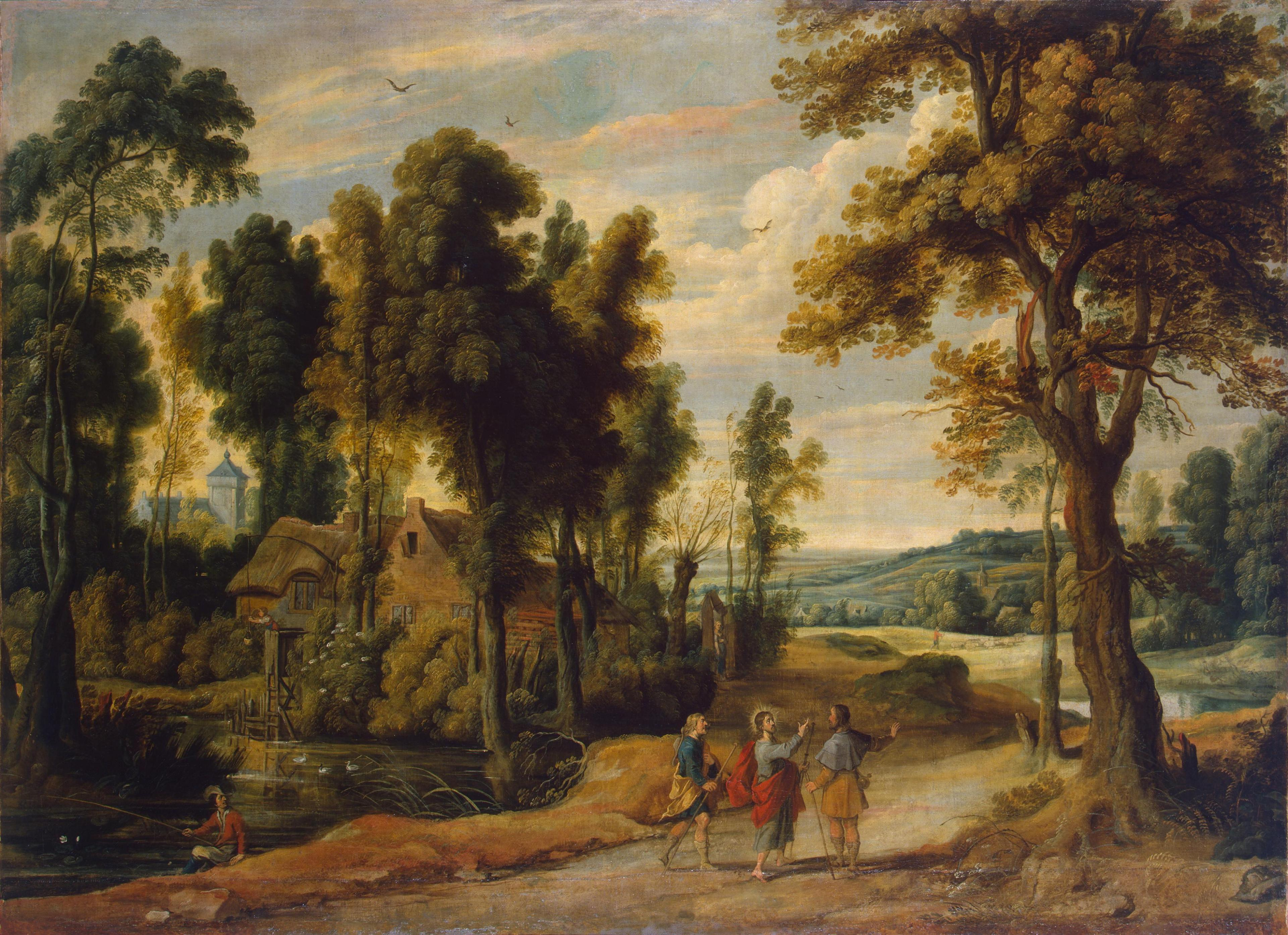
Christ and his Disciples on the Road to Emmaus, by Jan Wildens

The Walk to Emmaus or Emmaus Walk is a spiritual retreat developed by The Upper Room. It is part of the three-day movement, and came out of the Catholic Cursillo Movement. It started in the 1960s and 1970s when Episcopalians and Lutherans, and Tres Dias offered Cursillo. In 1978, The Upper Room of the General Board of Discipleship of the United Methodist Church trademarked Emmaus and adapted it into a primarily Protestant version.

== History ==
In the Catholic Church Emmaus began for women in 1978, with the approval of the Archdiocese of Miami. It was developed and conducted by a team of laywomen from St. Louis Church in Kendall, Florida. Father David G. Russell, who was pastor at that time, saw the need for, and envisioned, a parish-based retreat that enabled lay women to minister to lay women. He approached the secretariat of the Cursillo movement and asked if they would allow a parish-based Cursillo to be held at St. Louis. This request was denied. Since there was no other retreat of this type available at that time, Father Russell asked the Directress of Religious Education, Myrna Gallagher, to form a team and develop one. After intense prayer and much thought, it was established that the theme of the retreat would be based on the Scripture passage found in the Gospel of Luke 24:13-35, the Emmaus Reading.

In early 1985, Fr. Fetscher of St. Louis asked Jim Loretta from St. Louis Catholic Church, to look at starting a men's version of the Emmaus Retreat experience that Myrna Gallagher had started back in 1978. Jim Loretta and Larry Barfield, along with other men, developed a men's version of what Myrna Gallagher had done with the women. On February 14, 1986, the first Men's Emmaus was held at the Dominican Retreat House that was led by Jim Loretta. Eventually, one of the candidates from a previous weekend called to say they would like to have the same retreat at St. Brendan's Catholic Church. Larry Barfield from St. Louis went to St. Brendan's and put on the first "not at St. Louis" Men's Emmaus weekend, held at the youth center next to Mercy Hospital in Coconut Grove. Thereafter, Jim Loretta on February 14, 1988, put on the first Emmaus an event at St. John Neumann Catholic Church, and the program expanded thenceforth. Since that first Men's Emmaus in 1986, Men's Emmaus retreats have spread throughout the entire United States, every country in Central and South America, Trinidad, Dominican Republic, and to Shanghai, China. A retreat was even held underground in Cuba in 2012. As of 2020, there have been numerous men's and women's Emmaus retreats in Cuba.

Emmaus Retreats are different from the Catholic Cursillo. Cursillo aims to form "Catholic leaders" from those Catholics already on a walk with the Lord. Emmaus reaches out to all Christians who are members of church. Participants are encouraged to find ways to live out their individual call to discipleship in their home, church, and community. Today Emmaus retreats are held worldwide.

== Biblical reference ==
The name of the movement comes from the Gospel of Luke 24:13-35 (KJV).

In this passage, a follower of Jesus of Nazareth named Cleopas, also identified as Simon, and another unnamed traveler leave Jerusalem for the town of Emmaus on the day of Jesus' resurrection. On the journey the two travelers encounter an unnamed man who asks about the happenings over the past few days in Jerusalem concerning Jesus of Nazareth. Cleopas and his companion describe the events of that week. They tell about Jesus' trial, crucifixion, and burial. They also share that some of the women who followed Jesus discovered the tomb in which Jesus was buried empty. The unnamed man then proceeds to explain the writings of the prophet Moses concerning God's Messiah or Christ.

When the three travelers reach Emmaus, they share a meal. During the blessings of the meal, it is revealed to Cleopas and his companion that the unnamed man who accompanied them is none other than Jesus whom God has raised from the dead. In that moment of recognition, Jesus disappears from their presence. Cleopas and his companion immediately return to Jerusalem to tell the other followers of Jesus that he has appeared to Simon in his resurrected, glorified body.

Luke also records that the moment of recognition of the resurrected Jesus was in the blessing and breaking of bread, a reference to the Passover seder Jesus shared with his disciples commonly known as the Last Supper. Also, it is a reference to the Christian sacrament or ordinance or act of worship known among different branches of Christianity as Eucharist or Holy Communion or Lord's Supper.
