= Symeon the Studite =

10th-century Byzantine monk

Symeon the Studite, also Symeon the Pious or Symeon Eulabes, and sometimes Symeon the Elder, was an influential lay monk of the Monastery of Stoudios in Constantinople during the 10th century. He was the spiritual father, or teacher, of Symeon the New Theologian.

Little is known about Symeon's life. He was born around 918 AD and became a monk at the Monastery of Stoudios in 942—it is from his identification with the monastery that he is called "the Studite". He died in 986 or 987. Forty chapters in the book Patmiacus 427, all pertaining to the spiritual life, are credited to him as "Symeon the Devout" (Eulabes in Greek). His own writings show him as taking a practical approach to the spiritual life, while other writings from that time described him as a Holy Fool. Symeon the New Theologian revered him as a saint, which drew the rebuke of church officials who felt the younger Symeon was honoring someone who they considered to be less than saintly.
