= Symeon the New Theologian =

Christian saint, monk, and theologian (949–1022)

Saint Symeon the New Theologian
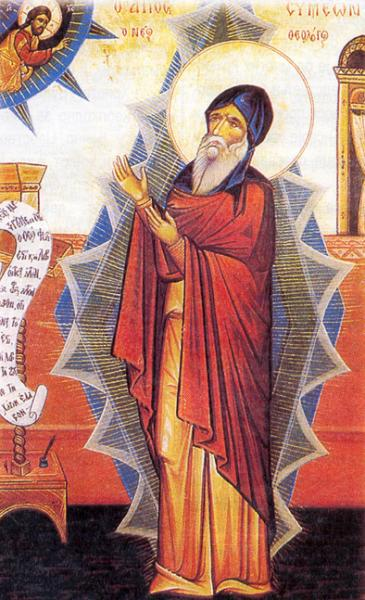
- An Orthodox icon of Saint Symeon

New Theologian Venerable
- Born: c. 949; Basilaion (modern-day Nallıhan, Ankara, Turkey)
- Died: 12 March 1022; Paloukiton, near Chrysopolis
- Venerated in: Eastern Orthodox Church; Byzantine Catholic Churches
- Feast: March 12; October 12
- Theology career
- Notable work: Ethical Discourses
- Theological work
- Tradition or movement: Christian mysticism Hesychasm
- Notable ideas: Theoria

Saint Symeon the New Theologian (Greek: Συμεὼν ὁ Νέος Θεολόγος; c. 949 – 12 March 1022) was an Eastern Orthodox monk and poet who was one of the three saints canonized by the Eastern Orthodox Church and given the title of "Theologian" (along with John the Apostle and Gregory of Nazianzus). "Theologian" was not applied to Symeon in the modern academic sense of theological study; the title was intended only to recognise someone who spoke from personal experience of the vision of God. One of his principal teachings was that humans could and should experience theoria (literally "contemplation," or direct experience of God).

Symeon was born into the Byzantine nobility and given a traditional education. At age fourteen, he met Symeon the Studite, a renowned monk of the Monastery of Stoudios in Constantinople, who convinced him to give his own life to prayer and asceticism under the elder Symeon's guidance. By the time he was thirty, Symeon the New Theologian became the abbot of the Monastery of Saint Mamas, a position he held for twenty-five years. He attracted many monks and clergy with his reputation for sanctity, though his teachings brought him into conflict with church authorities, who would eventually send him into exile. His most well known disciple was Nicetas Stethatos who wrote the Life of Symeon.

Symeon is recognized as the first Eastern Christian mystic to share his own mystical experiences freely. Some of his writings are included in the Philokalia, a collection of texts by early Christian mystics on contemplative prayer and hesychast teachings. Symeon wrote and spoke frequently about the importance of experiencing directly the grace of God, often talking about his own experiences of God as divine light. Another common subject in his writings was the need of putting oneself under the guidance of a spiritual father. The authority for many of his teachings derived from the traditions of the Desert Fathers, early Christian monks and ascetics. Symeon's writings include Hymns of Divine Love, Ethical Discourses, and The Catechetical Discourses.

== Biography ==
=== Early life ===
The details of Symeon's life come from his own writings and from the Life of Symeon, written by his disciple Nicetas. He was born at Basileion in Galatia to Basil and Theophano Galaton, members of the Byzantine nobility who supported the Macedonian dynasty. His given name at birth is unclear—it was traditional at that time, when becoming a monk, to take on a new name with the same initial as one's birth name. Symeon may have ignored that tradition in order to take the same name as his spiritual father, Symeon the Studite. In his writings, he sometimes described the experiences of "George," which might have been his birth name. Symeon received a basic Greek school education until the age of eleven, when an uncle recognized that he had potential for higher learning. The uncle helped Symeon to complete his secondary education at the court of the emperor Basil II and his brother Constantine VIII.

At age fourteen, he met Symeon the Studite (also called Symeon the Pious), a holy monk of the Monastery of Stoudios in Constantinople. That meeting convinced the younger Symeon to forgo higher education and take on Symeon the Studite as his spiritual father. At that time he began studying the life of prayer and asceticism under his guidance, with the desire to enter the monastery immediately. Symeon the Studite asked the young Symeon to wait before becoming a monk, so he spent the years until age twenty-seven serving in the household of a patrician, though according to some sources he served the emperor instead.

Living a worldly life during the day, he reportedly spent his evenings in vigils and prayer, putting into practice the writings of two authors—Marcus Eremita and Diadochos of Photiki—that were given to him by his spiritual father. It was during this time that Symeon had his first experience of God as divine light, as he described later in one of his Discourses (Disc. 22.2–4). He attributed the experience to the prayers of Symeon the Studite. In spite of the experience, the young Symeon confessed that he still fell into worldly ways of living. Direct personal experience of God was to become one of Symeon's central teachings in his writings, and to the monks who followed him.

=== Abbot of Saint Mamas monastery ===
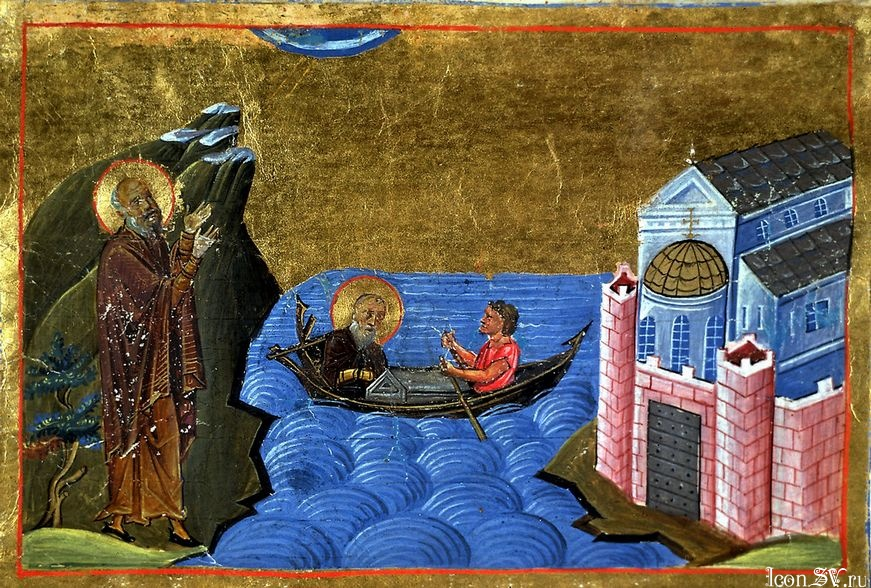
Byzantine miniature depicting the Monastery of Stoudios.

At age twenty-seven, he entered the Monastery of Stoudios, giving his life over completely to discipleship to his teacher Symeon the Studite. The elder Symeon was not an ordained priest, but a simple monk who was considered holy by many people. The younger Symeon was extremely zealous in his practices and in following his teacher—to such an extent that the abbot of the monastery insisted that Symeon leave after only a few months.

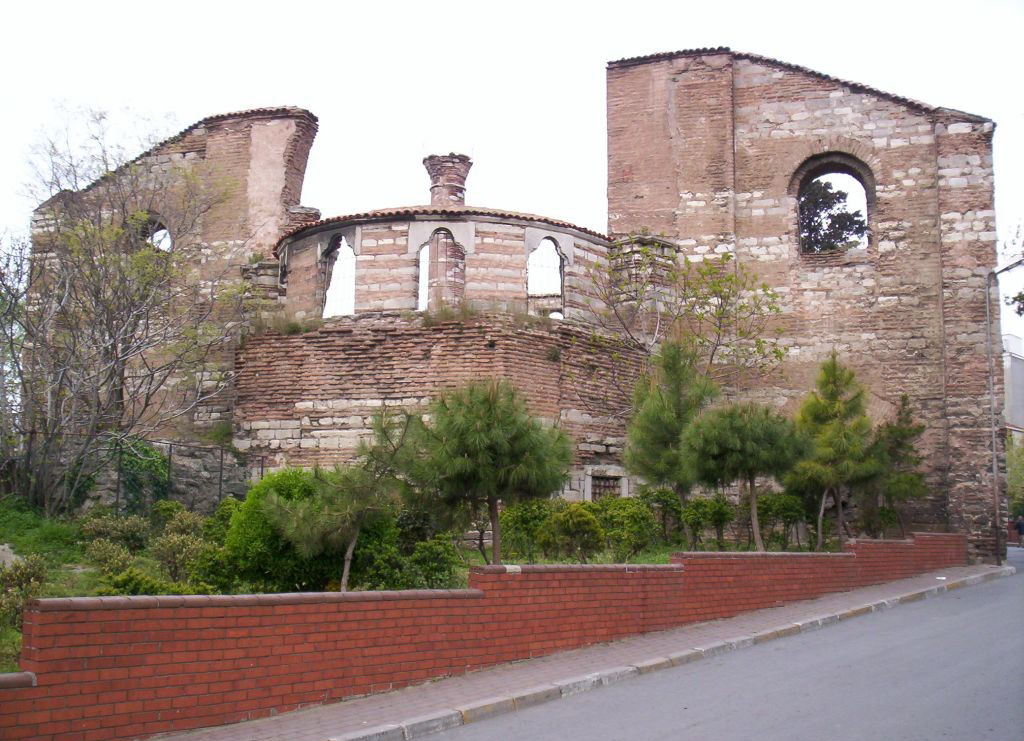
Remaining walls of Monastery of Stoudios in modern-day Istanbul.

Following the elder Symeon's advice, he left for the nearby Monastery of Saint Mamas in Constantinople, which was described as run down, both physically and spiritually. During his time at Saint Mamas he continued to follow Symeon the Studite's guidance. Within three years after moving to Saint Mamas, Symeon was tonsured as a monk, ordained as a priest, and elected as the abbot of the monastery. He spent the next twenty-five years as abbot of Saint Mamas, attracting many monks and clergy with his reputation for learning and sanctity.

Not all of the monks were attracted by Symeon's zealous approach. Symeon attempted to reform the Byzantine monasteries, where monks had become subservient to the emperor and had acquired large holdings of property, libraries, and art. His writings and teachings were aimed at returning the monasteries to their traditional role in the early church, urging the monks to take up a life of simplicity, asceticism, purity of heart, and constant prayer. The strict monastic discipline for which Symeon aimed upset several monks in the monastery. Symeon also took a more emotional approach to worship, suggesting that a monk shouldn't take the sacrament without tears. The introduction of vegetarian meals, along with other unique practices to instill discipline and humility, also caused some displeasure among the monks.

Fifteen years after becoming abbot, one morning after the Divine Liturgy a group of approximately thirty monks rose against Symeon, who drove them away. Breaking the locks on the monastery gate on their way out, the monks took their appeal to the Patriarch Sisinios, who sided with Symeon and sent the monks into exile. Symeon pleaded on their behalf, doing everything he could to have the monks return to the monastery, including seeking out some of the monks to apologize to them. During his time as abbot, Symeon wrote Hymns of Divine Love (completed during his exile), the Discourses, and many letters and polemical works which have been lost. He also wrote articles relating to his disputes with the church theologians—these survived as his theological and ethical treatises. In 1005 Symeon resigned as abbot of Saint Mamas, appointing one of his disciples in his stead, and taking up a more solitary life at the monastery.

=== Opposition from the church ===
Symeon endured severe opposition from church authorities, particularly from the chief theologian of the emperor's court, Archbishop Stephen, who at one time was the Metropolitan of Nicomedia. Stephen was a former politician and diplomat with a reputation for a thorough theoretical understanding of theology, but one which was removed from actual experience of the spiritual life. Symeon, in contrast, held the view that one must have actual experience of the Holy Spirit in order to speak about God, at the same time recognizing the authority of scripture and of the earlier Church Fathers. Their differing views on the source of authority to speak on spiritual matters was the cause of several years of intense conflict, ending with Symeon's eventual exile.

Stephen found fault with Symeon especially for his charismatic approach, and his support of individual direct experience of God's grace. Symeon believed that direct experience gave monks the authority to preach and give absolution of sins, without the need for formal ordination—as practiced by his own teacher, Symeon the Studite. Church authorities also taught from a speculative and philosophical perspective, while Symeon taught from his own direct mystical experience. Symeon's teachings, especially those regarding the direct experience of God's grace, brought accusations of heresy from Stephen. Symeon responded to Stephen's charges by declaring that the real heresy was to teach that it is impossible to have direct experience of God (Disc. 29.4).

Stephen also found fault with Symeon for revering his spiritual father, Symeon the Studite. At that time, formal recognition of saints was seldom practiced and not obligatory, so revered monks were informally recognized and honored by monasteries and by their disciples. Every year the younger Symeon arranged a celebration honoring his teacher, which included an icon of Symeon the Studite and a service to him. Stephen rebuked Symeon for honoring his teacher as a saint, because in his opinion the Studite was not worthy of any honor. The conflict between the two lasted for six years.

Stephen was finally able to bring Symeon before the Synod on charges of honoring as a saint someone who Stephen believed was far from saintly. At first, Patriarch Sergius II of Constantinople supported Symeon, going so far as to send candles and perfume in support of the veneration of Symeon the Studite at St. Mammas. Stephen attacked the Studite as unholy and sinful, and was eventually able to convince others that Symeon's homage was improper by convincing them that the Studite held some unorthodox beliefs. As a compromise, Stephen suggested that the annual festival honoring the elder Symeon be held as a private observance within the monastery. Symeon the New Theologian refused to compromise, declaring that it was his duty to honor the Church Fathers and the saints, and in January 1009 was condemned to go into exile. Stephen also convinced the Patriarch to order all icons of Symeon the Studite removed from St. Mammas, with many of them destroyed or covered over with soot.

Symeon, for his part, never backed down from the church authorities. In one of his hymns, he had Christ speaking the following rebuke to the bishops:

They (the bishops) unworthily handle My Body

and seek avidly to dominate the masses...
They are seen to appear as brilliant and pure,
but their souls are worse than mud and dirt,
worse even than any kind of deadly poison,

these evil and perverse men! (Hymn 58)

=== Exile and death ===
In 1009, Symeon was sent into exile near Paloukiton, a small village near Chrysopolis on the Asiatic shore of the Bosphorus. According to one account, he was left by church authorities alone and without food, in the middle of winter. There he found a deserted and ruined chapel that had been dedicated to Saint Macrina. It happened to be on land owned by one of Symeon's spiritual children, Christopher Phagouras, who donated the land and proceeds to start a monastery.

By this time, Symeon had many disciples—some of them, including the patrician Geneseos, appealed to Sergius II, the Patriarch of Constantinople, to lift the order of exile. Out of fear that the dispute would reach the emperor, Sergius II lifted the exile order completely, and then offered to re-establish Symeon at the monastery of St. Mammas and consecrate him as archbishop of an important see in Constantinople. The only qualification was that Symeon must show some restraint in his celebration of Symeon the Studite's festival day. Symeon refused to compromise—the Patriarch, out of respect for Symeon, gave him his blessing to "live together with your disciples and act according to your good pleasure."

Symeon remained at the Saint Macrina monastery, where many close disciples, both monks and secular people, gathered around him. At Saint Macrina he was free of monks who were averse to his discipline and zeal, and free from direct conflict with church authorities. He continued to honor Symeon the Studite—most of the clergy from Constantinople, along with many monks and laymen, joined him during those celebrations. He also wrote during that time and made himself accessible to all who wanted to see him. Symeon spent the last thirteen years of his life in exile, dying from dysentery on 12 March 1022. According to his biographer and disciple, Nicetas, Symeon foretold his own death many years previously, and on his last day called together all the monks to sing the funeral hymns.

=== Veneration ===
Symeon is recognized as a saint by the Eastern Orthodox Church, and was spoken about positively by Pope Benedict XVI in 2009. The title of "Theologian" was not given to him in the modern academic sense of someone who is learned in theology, but to recognize someone who speaks from personal experience of the vision of God. Until Symeon's time, that title was reserved mainly for John the Apostle, author of one of the four gospels, and Gregory of Nazianzus, writer of contemplative poetry. His opponents derisively called him the "new" theologian because of his creative approach—his supporters, and later the Church at large, embraced the name in the most positive sense. Since March 12 falls during Great Lent, Saint Simeon’s Feast is transferred to October 12.

== Writings ==
After Symeon's death, his writings were kept alive by small groups of followers, eventually becoming one of the central teachings of the hesychast movement. Many copies of his works were made in the following centuries, particularly around the 14th century, and among the Eastern Orthodox monasteries on Mount Athos. His recognition has always been greater outside the official church, its calendar and liturgy. Historians credit this to his zealous personality, his criticism of the church hierarchy, his emphasis on direct experience of God, and some of his unorthodox teachings—including his belief that an unordained monk who had the direct experience of God was empowered to absolve others of their sins.

Symeon wrote in a similar style and taught the traditional views of several early Christian fathers and hesychasts, including St. Augustine, Gregory of Nyssa, Gregory of Nazianzus, and Mark the Hermit. Where Symeon differed from his predecessors was in his transparent and open sharing of his most interior experiences. Symeon was the first Byzantine mystic to freely share those experiences, which were given in the context of his teaching that the direct experience of God was something to which all Christians could aspire.

One catechesis of Symeon's, On Faith, along with a composite work titled One Hundred and Fifty-Three Practical and Theological Texts, are included in the Philokalia, a collection of texts by early Christian mystics. Another text in the Philokalia, titled The Three Methods of Prayer is also attributed to Symeon—it describes a method of practicing the Jesus Prayer that includes direction on correct posture and breathing while reciting the prayer. It is extremely unlikely that he wrote that text—some scholars attribute it to Nikiphoros the Monk, while others believe it was written by disciples of Symeon.

=== Discourses ===
The Discourses are the central work of Symeon's life, and were written during his time as abbot at St. Mammas (980–998). They consist of thirty-four discourses, along with two pieces on thanksgiving, that were given as talks to his monks and others interested in the spiritual life—often at St. Mammas during Matins services—and then compiled and likely edited by Symeon himself. They were widely read in Constantinople even before Symeon's exile. Their style maintains the personality of Symeon as expressed in his live talks: simplicity, sincerity, humility, speaking from the heart, and "full of fire and persuasion." There is no obvious sequence or order to the Discourses—the topics are apparently a collection of talks given during different liturgical seasons or at feast days of saints.

There are two main themes running through the different discourses. One is the traditional theme of the early hesychasts and mystical theologians of the Christian East, especially the practices of faith (praxis) and asceticism (askesis) that they frequently taught as the way to reach direct experience of God (theoria). Specific practices discussed by Symeon include: repentance, detachment, renunciation, mercy, sorrow for sins, faith, and contemplation.

Symeon's other main emphasis is the power of the Holy Spirit to transform, and the profound mystical union with God that is the result of a holy life. Symeon referred to this as the Baptism of the Holy Spirit, compared to the more ritualistic Baptism of water. Symeon believed that Christianity had descended into formulae and church ritual, which for many people replaced the earlier emphasis on actual and direct experience of God. The Discourses express Symeon's strong conviction that the life of a Christian must be much more than mere observance of rules, and must include personal experience of the presence of the living Christ. Symeon describes his own conversion and mystical experience of the divine light.

=== Hymns of Divine Love ===
In Hymns of Divine Love (also called Hymns of Divine Eros) most of which were completed during his time in exile, Symeon describes his vision of God as uncreated divine light. That experience of divine luminosity is associated by Symeon with the Holy Trinity, with God, and sometimes with Christ. The Hymns are similar in theme to the Discourses, but are written with poetic meter and rhyme. He began writing them at the same time as the Discourses but only finished editing them during the last thirteen years of his life at the monastery of St. Macrina. There are 58 hymns totaling approximately 11,000 verses.

The Hymns cover various themes, similar to the Discourses: repentance, death, the practice of virtue, charity, detachment, and more. Especially notable are the Hymns that recount Symeon's mystical experiences and his love for Christ, which have been described as "ecstatic writing and ...mystical content that becomes very personal, both to Symeon and to the reader."

An excerpt from Hymn 25 includes the following description of Symeon's mystical union with God as light:

—But, Oh, what intoxication of light, Oh, what movements of fire!

Oh, what swirlings of the flame in me, miserable one that I am,
coming from You and Your glory!
The glory I know it and I say it is your Holy Spirit,
who has the same nature with You, and the same honor, O word;
He is of the same race, the same glory,
of the same essence, He alone with your Father,
and with you, O Christ, O God of the universe!
I fall down in adoration before You.
I thank You that You have made me worthy to know, however little it may be,

the power of Your divinity.

=== Theological and ethical treatises ===
Symeon's theological and ethical treatises were original written works, as compared to many of his other writings that were taken from his talks. They cover his positions on various controversial issues of theology. Many of them were directed at Stephen, his main antagonist in the church, along with other church officials whom Symeon saw as taking an overly theoretical approach to Christianity. In these pieces Symeon defended the traditions of the early Byzantine mystical theologians from the teachings of the church officials of his own time. Central to this defense was Symeon's view that the revelation of scripture could only be understood through the experience of divine grace given to the pure of heart during contemplation.

The treatises cover a wide range of topics, including Symeon's defense against Stephen regarding his own views on the unity of the Holy Trinity. He also presents his doctrine on mysticism, the necessity of faith, the possibility of direct experience of God, the Baptism of the Holy Spirit, and more. The last four treatises were written during his exile, and discuss living a holy life while on earth, salvation through faith and good works, and the need for solitude if one wants to become a channel of divine grace to others.

== Teachings ==
The church authorities regularly challenged Symeon, even though his teachings were rooted in the Gospels. He was also faithful to the early Greek Fathers and the two main traditions of Byzantine spirituality: the Alexandrian School, which took a more intellectual approach, and the "school of the heart", represented by Mark the Hermit, Pseudo-Macarius, John Climacus, and other early ascetic monks. He combined these different traditions with his own inner experience in a synthesis that was new in Byzantine mysticism.

Symeon often taught that all followers of Christ could have the direct experience of God, or theoria, just as the early church fathers experienced and taught. In that context he frequently described his own experiences of God as divine light. He preached to his monks that the way to God's grace was through a life of simplicity, asceticism, sanctity, and contemplation, which was also the doctrine of the hermits and monks known as the Desert Fathers. In addition, Symeon placed great emphasis on putting oneself under the complete guidance of a spiritual father.

=== Direct experience ===
A central theme throughout Symeon's teachings and writings is that all Christians should aspire to have actual direct experience of God in deep contemplation, or theoria. Regarding his own mystical experiences, he presented them not as unique to himself, but as the norm for all Christians. He taught that the experience came after purification through prayer, repentance, and asceticism. He especially called on his monks to take on the traditional charismatic and prophetic role in the Church.

In one of his Discourses he defended the frequent sharing of his own inner experiences, writing that it was not presumptuous, but was done to encourage others in their inner life:

We have written them because we are mindful of God's gifts, which He has bestowed on our unworthy self from the beginning of life until the present moment ... and in gratitude we show to all of you the talent He has entrusted to us. How can we be silent before such an abundance of blessings, or out of ingratitude bury the talent that has been given to us (Mt. 25:18), like ungrateful and evil servants? ... By our oral teaching we encourage you too to strive that you may have part in His gifts and enjoy them, the gifts of which we, though unworthy, have been partakers through His unutterable goodness. (Discourse XXXIV)

=== Divine light ===
Symeon repeatedly describes the experience of divine light in his writings, as both an inward and outward mystical experience. These experiences began in his youth, and continued all during his life. They came to him during inward prayer and contemplation, and were associated with a feeling of indescribable joy, as well as the intellectual understanding that the light was a vision of God. In his writings, he spoke directly to God about the experience variously as "the pure Light of your face" and "You deigned to reveal Your face to me like a formless sun." He also described the light as the grace of God, and taught that its experience was associated with a mind that was completely still and had transcended itself. At times he described the light speaking to him with kindness, and explaining who it was.

In Discourse XXVIII Symeon wrote about the light and its power to transform:

It shines on us without evening, without change, without alteration, without form. It speaks, works, lives, gives life, and changes into light those whom it illuminates. We bear witness that "God is light," and those to whom it has been granted to see Him have all beheld Him as light. Those who have seen Him have received Him as light, because the light of His glory goes before Him, and it is impossible for Him to appear without light. Those who have not seen His light have not seen Him, for He is the light, and those who have not received the light have not yet received grace. Those who have received grace have received the light of God and have received God, even as Christ Himself, who is the Light, has said, "I will live in them and move among them." (2 Cor. 6:16)

=== Guidance of a spiritual father ===
Symeon taught that putting oneself under the guidance of a spiritual father was essential for those who were serious about living the spiritual life. That relationship was a historical tradition especially prominent among the Desert Fathers, who defined the qualifications for acting in the role of a spiritual father: personal experience; an interior life; purity of heart; the vision of God; insight; inspiration; discernment. Official ordination as a priest was not a requirement—Symeon's own spiritual father was a simple unordained monk who had many spiritual children. Symeon also taught that such teachers were empowered by their holiness to preach and to absolve others of their sins, a view that brought him into disagreement with church leaders of his time.

In Hymns of Divine Love Symeon wrote that:

Listen only to the advice of your spiritual father,

answer him with humility
and, as to God, tell him your thoughts,
even to a simple meditation, without hiding anything,

do nothing without his advice.

=== Absolution of sins ===
Symeon's teachings on the hearing of confession and the absolution of sins brought him into regular conflict with church authorities, particularly Archbishop Stephen. According to Symeon, only one who had the grace and direct experience of God was empowered by God to preach and absolve the sins of others. Stephen held the view that only ordained priests had that authority. Symeon's views were colored by his own spiritual father, Symeon the Studite, who was a simple monk, unordained, and yet who preached and gave absolution. In one of his Ethical Discourses Symeon went further and wrote that one should not give absolution without having first received the experience of God's grace:

Be careful, I beg you, never to assume the debts of others when you are a debtor yourself; do not dare give absolution without having received in your heart the One who takes away the sin of the world." (Eth. 6')

== Works ==
English translations

- deCatanzaro, C. J.; Maloney S. J., George (1980). Symeon the New Theologian: The Discourses. Paulist Press. ISBN 0-8091-2230-8.
- Golitzin, Alexander (1995). On the Mystical Life: The Ethical Discourses: The Church and the Last Things. Vol. 1 of On the Mystical Life, Popular Patristics Series. St. Vladimir's Seminary Press. ISBN 0-88141-142-6.
- Golitzin, Alexander (1996). On the Mystical Life: The Ethical Discourses: On Virtue and Christian Life. Vol. 2 of On the Mystical Life, Popular Patristics Series. St. Vladimir's Seminary Press. ISBN 0-88141-143-4.
- Golitzin, Alexander (1998). On the Mystical Life: The Ethical Discourses: Life, Times and Theology. Vol. 3 of On the Mystical Life, Popular Patristics Series. St. Vladimir's Seminary Press. ISBN 0-88141-144-2.
- Griggs, Daniel K. (2011). Divine Eros: Hymns of St Symeon the New Theologian. Vol. 40: Popular Patristics Series. St. Vladimir's Seminary Press. ISBN 978-0-88141-349-6.
- Maloney, George A. (1976). Hymns of Divine Love. Dimension Books. ASIN B0006W7NV6.
- Maloney, George A. (2021). Hymns of Divine Love. SAGOM Press. ISBN 978-1-945699-34-4.
- McGuckin, Paul (1982). Symeon the New Theologian: The Practical and Theological Chapters and Three Theological Discourses. Vol. 41: Cistercian Studies. Cistercian Publications. ISBN 0-87907-941-X.
- Palmer, G. E. H. (1999). The Philokalia, Volume 4: The Complete Text; Compiled by St. Nikodimos of the Holy Mountain & St. Markarios of Corinth. Macmillan. ISBN 0-571-19382-X.
- Rose, Fr. Seraphim (2013). The First-Created Man. Saint Herman Press. ISBN 978-0-938635-11-6.
- Turner, H. J. M. (2009). The Epistles of St Symeon the New Theologian. Oxford University Press. ISBN 978-0-19-954663-3.

== See also ==
- Eastern Christian monasticism
- Navel gazing
- Nepsis
- Niketas Stethatos
- Theosis (Eastern Orthodox theology)
