= Three-day movement =

Christian network of retreats providers

The three-day movement refers to a network of religious groups conducting spiritual retreats to enrich the lives of fellow Christians.

== Description ==
Sustained by secular clergy, the laity, and other previous participants, the movement is associated with a retreat spanning three days. Some adherents proclaim the life of an attendee transforms on the fourth day.

Such retreats began as an apostolic movement on the island of Mallorca, where a group of Catholic laity first developed the Cursillo in 1944. With participation unrestricted by Christian denomination, the Cursillo soon spread to other countries. In time Cursillo attendees developed similar programs tailored to specific audience groups, including programs for younger people, for the incarcerated or those affected by incarceration, and at times for particular denominational approaches.

Some organizations within the three-day movement license Cursillo material, while other groups develop similar programs under another name, or even deviate from the three-day structure. The broader three-day movement enjoys much collaboration: different organized groups provide mutual ongoing support, expressed through prayer, sending letters, and other means. The general lack of denominational requirements among participants allows for the movement's collaborative nature.

== Specific programs ==
- Cursillo, the Catholic three-day event
  - Episcopal Cursillo, known in some countries as Anglican Cursillo.
  - Lutheran Via de Cristo.
  - Chayah, a ministry to young jail inmates based on Lutheran Cursillo.
  - Presbyterian Pilgrimage
- Tres Dias.
- Emmaus Ministries
  - Walk to Emmaus, a ministry of The Upper Room
  - Chrysalis, for high school students
  - Face to Face, for older adults in a residential setting
- ACTS
  - Alarga, for those for whom a normal three-day program would be physically challenging.
- Kairos Prison Ministry.
  - Kairos Torch, for juvenile detainees.
  - Kairos Outside, for those affected by an incarceration.
- Awakening
- Keryx Prison Ministry, for Michigan penal system
  - Keryx In Community, a non-denominational ministry held in local churches in Michigan
  - Michigan Youth Challenge Academy (MYCA) a "boot camp" program for at-risk teens
- G12 Vision, the movement led by Colombian charismatic pastor Cesar Castellanos, with its “Encuentros” weekend program
- Family Lenten Retreat at the Araneta Coliseum, an annual three-day movement founded in 1983 by Msgr Cesar B. Pagulayan and organized by Our Lady of Perpetual Help Parish in the Diocese of Cubao.
