= Rufiniana =

Africa Proconsularis (125 AD)

The diocese of Rufiniana (Latin: Dioecesis Rufinianensis) is a suppressed and titular bishopric of the Roman Catholic Church.

The exact location of the diocese is now lost to history, but it was likely in northern Tunisia.

== History ==
There are two documented bishops of this diocese:

- the Catholic Mariano, who spoke at the Carthage conference of 411, which saw the Catholic and Donatist bishops of Roman Africa gathered together; on that occasion the bishopric did not have Donatist bishops;
- the bishop Donatus, who took part in the synod gathered in Carthage by the Vandal king of Hungary in 484, after which he was exiled.

Today Rufiniana survives as a titular bishop's seat; the current titular bishop is Anton Leichtfried, auxiliary bishop of Sankt Pölten.

== Known Bishops ==
- Mariano (fl 411)
- Donato (fl 484)
- Nikë Prela (1969 - 1996)
- Luiz Vicente Bernetti, (1996 - 2005)
- Anton Leichtfried, (2006 - current)
