= Discipleship Ministries =

- Type: Agency of the United Methodist Church
- Headquarters: Nashville, TN
- General Secretary: Rev. Jeffrey Campbell
- Parent organization: United Methodist Church
- Website: umcdiscipleship.org
- Formerly called: General Board of Discipleship

Discipleship Ministries, formerly known as the General Board of Discipleship (GBOD), is one of 13 international agencies, boards and commissions of The United Methodist Church. GBOD was established by the 1972 United Methodist General Conference, and in March 2015, officially changed its name. Discipleship Ministries was given the primary responsibility for the support of receiving, nurturing, caring, and sending ministries of congregations in The United Methodist Church.

The board provides resources in the areas of Christian education, worship, music, evangelism, new church development, stewardship, lay leadership development, age-level (children, youth, adult) and family ministries, small-group ministries, ethnic local church concerns, devotional life, spiritual formation, anti-racism resources and other areas related to the lives of people, church leaders, and the ministries of congregations.

Written and audiovisual resources produced by Discipleship Ministries staff support the ministries of clergy and lay people and congregations. Staff members also provide training, education, and skill development seminars and workshops.

== Organization ==
Discipleship Ministries staff includes specialists in evangelism, worship, Christian education, music, stewardship and other areas of ministry. The agency is organized in these major divisions:

=== The Upper Room ===
The Upper Room is a global ministry that supports the spiritual formation of Christians. From its beginnings as a daily devotional guide, Upper Room Ministries has grown to include publications, programs, prayer support and other resources to help people of all ages and denominations. The Upper Room is a daily devotional guide published in 78 languages through 41 international editions. The guide celebrated its 75th anniversary in 2010.

Upper Room resources are grouped in five different areas: personal spirituality; children, youth, young adults and families; small groups; spiritual leadership, and cross-cultural and international ministries. Upper Room Ministries also publishes books and magazines for people of all ages and provides various programs and events.

Upper Room Ministries also includes the Emmaus Ministries International Office, which oversees the family of Emmaus Ministries, including: Walk to Emmaus, Chrysalis, Face to Face, Journey to the Table, and Discovery Weekend.

=== Leadership Ministries ===
Leadership Ministries provides resources to both the laity and clergy leaders of The United Methodist Church who work in local congregations, districts and annual (regional) conferences. The division supports and develops leaders in all areas of church’s life, including worship, Christian education, congregational development, evangelism, small groups, Wesleyan studies, racial/ethnic ministries, stewardship, congregational and conference leadership and covenant and accountable discipleship.

=== Young People's Ministries ===
Young People's Ministries was established in 2004 especially for young people aged 14 to 30 and the people who minister to them.

Young People’s Ministries sponsors international events that bring young leaders together to focus on advocacy, faith formation, resource development, communication and networking. Grants, scholarships and consultations are available to help local churches develop projects and programs that support young people.

=== New Church Starts (Path 1) ===
New Church Starts (Path 1) is a team of leaders from national, regional and local levels of The United Methodist Church. The team helps people to establish new congregations throughout the United States. The division recruits, organizes, offers best practices and trains people to start United Methodist churches in communities that have no vital churches and also helps healthy congregations to branch out and assist in starting new churches.

=== Board Administration ===
Administrative functions of the board are carried out by the Office of the General Secretary, the Office of Financial Services, Human Resources, Building Services, Information Technology, Communications and Web Development. The administrative offices are located in Nashville, Tennessee. The current General Secretary (Chief Executive Officer) of the agency is the Rev. Jeffrey Campbell.

== For More Information ==
- Official website
- Upper Room Ministries
- Young People's Ministries
- New Church Starts (Path 1)
