= Harp and bowl =

Musical meditative prayer and worship practise model

The Harp and Bowl style of worship, which features musical prayer, derives its name from Revelation 5:8, which describes heavenly creatures where each of them "had a harp" and "were holding golden bowls full of incense, which are the prayers of the saints."
