= The Upper Room (Devotional and Ministry Organization) =

Christian publishing organization

- Parent company: Discipleship Ministries
- Founded: 1935
- Country of origin: United States
- Headquarters location: Nashville, Tennessee
- Publication types: Magazines, books
- Nonfiction topics: Christianity
- Official website: www.upperroom.org

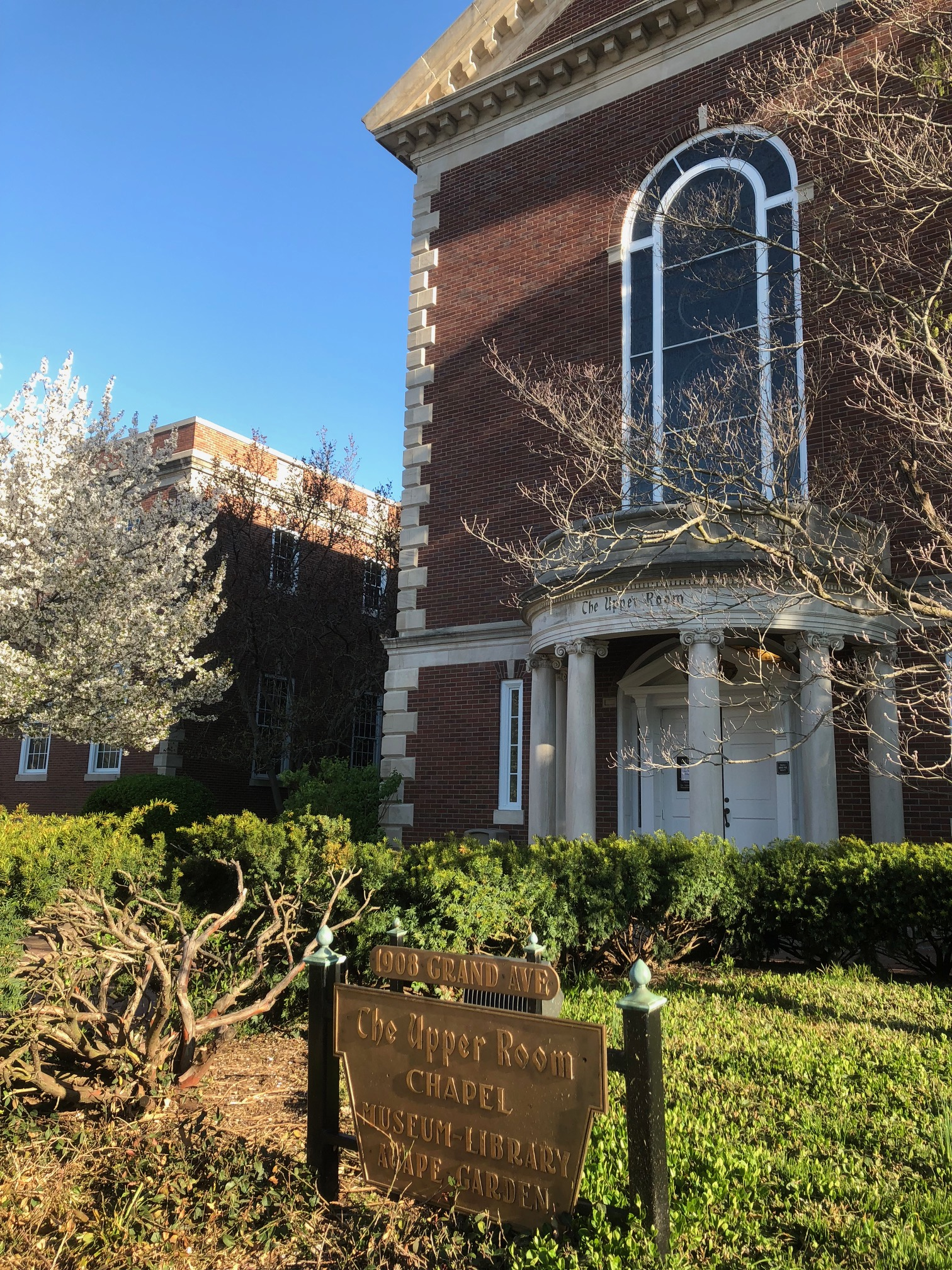
The Upper Room Chapel

The Upper Room is a Christian organization that publishes books and magazines and that produces programs to support the spiritual life of Christians around the world. The Upper Room is best known for The Upper Room daily devotional, which is published in 35 languages and is available in more than 100 countries. Other publications include devozine for teens and Pockets for children. Programs include The Walk to Emmaus and The Academy for Spiritual Formation.

The Upper Room has a chapel, which features a nearly life-size woodcarving of Leonardo da Vinci's The Last Supper. Services are held in the chapel each Wednesday. Attached to the chapel is the Christian Art Museum, which has a permanent display reflecting the global ministry of The Upper Room.

The Upper Room has its roots in The United Methodist Church, but its offerings are ecumenical and global. Its vision is "to foster an international community of people and congregations who are seeking God, building a vision of new life in Christ, nurturing one another by sharing experiences of God's love and guidance, and encouraging one another in Christian action to transform the world."

== History ==
The Upper Room daily devotional guide began publication in 1935, and the first 100,000 copies quickly sold out. In 1938, it published its first language editions, Korean, Spanish, and Hindustani. In 1940, the Braille edition began, and chaplains began distributing the devotional to the military. By 1944, circulation had passed the two million mark. In late 2009, the one billionth copy of The Upper Room rolled off the presses.

From 1971 to 2017, The Upper Room published Alive Now, a thematic, bimonthly magazine; and from 1986 to 2017, it published Weavings, a journal that wove together the voices of the finest leaders in the Christian spiritual world. In 1981, The Upper Room began publishing Pockets for children. In 1996, it started publishing devozine for youth.

The two flagship programs of The Upper Room are The Walk to Emmaus and The Academy for Spiritual Formation. The Walk to Emmaus began in 1978 and emphases Christian spiritual renewal and formation, beginning with a three-day weekend course in Christian formation. Over the years, it has expanded to include Chrysalis for teens, Journey to the Table for young adults, Face to Face for older adults, and Discovery Weekend for middle-schoolers. In 1983 The Academy for Spiritual Formation was founded. It offers an in-depth experience into spiritual practices of the Christian life.

Today, The Upper Room's books, magazines, and programs are used throughout the world.

== Structure ==
The Upper Room is a 501(c)3 non-profit organization, incorporated in the U.S. state of Tennessee.

== Locations ==
The Upper Room is headquartered in Nashville, Tennessee. Africa Upper Room Ministries is located in Eikenhof, Johannesburg, South Africa. In 2016, The Upper Room opened an office in Buenos Aires, Argentina.

== See also ==
- Christian devotional literature
- Prayer in Christianity
