= Hypatius of Bithynia =

Hypatius of Bithynia (Greek: Ὑπάτιος; died ca. 450) was a monk and hermit of the fifth century. A Phrygian, he became a hermit at the age of nineteen in Thrace. He then traveled to Constantinople and then Chalcedon with another hermit named Jason. He became abbot of a hermitage at Chalcedon.

He was an opponent of Nestorianism and sheltered Alexander Akimetes and others whose safety was threatened by the Nestorians.

He is credited with halting a revival of the Olympic Games because of their pagan origins.

His feast day is June 17 in the Eastern Orthodox and Byzantine Catholic Churches.

== See also ==
- Desert Fathers
- Poustinia
