= Niketas Stethatos =

11th-century Byzantine mystic and theologian

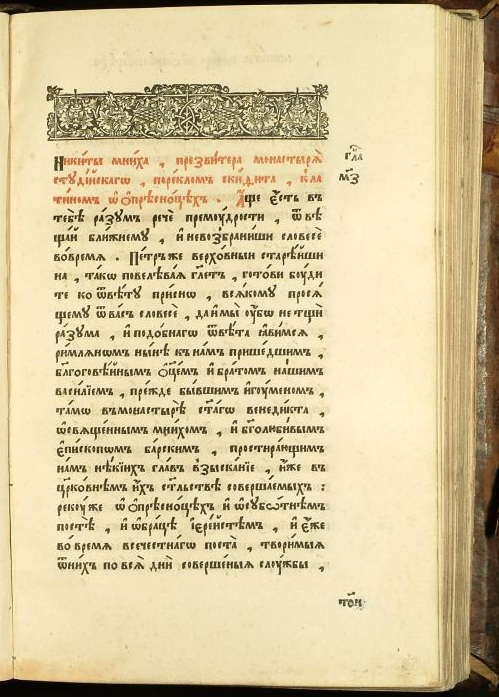
- Born: c. 1005
- Died: c. 1090
- Venerated in: Eastern Orthodox Church

Niketas Stethatos (Greek: Νικήτας Στηθᾶτος, Latin: Nicetas Pectoratus; c. 1005 – c. 1090) was a Byzantine mystic and theologian who is considered a saint by the Eastern Orthodox Church. He was a follower of Symeon the New Theologian and wrote the most complete biography of Symeon, Life of Symeon.

== Life ==
Niketas Stethatos was born c. 1005 and entered the Monastery of Stoudios in Constantinople at the age of fourteen. He became a close disciple of Symeon the New Theologian, eventually writing the most complete biography of his teacher, the Life of Symeon. Niketas later became abbot of the Monastery of Stoudios. The sobriquet "Stethatos", meaning "courageous," was given to Niketas due to his speaking out against Constantine IX Monomachos having an illicit mistress.

Niketas Stethatos is credited with defending Symeon the New Theologian's teachings on hesychast prayer, which were considered subversive even by some eastern church authorities. Niketas gained the support of the Patriarch of Constantinople, Michael Cerularius, who eventually won Symeon's canonization. Niketas later supported Michael Cerularius in 1054, taking part in the conflict that became the East-West Schism, writing anti-Latin treatises criticizing the use of unleavened bread, Sabbath fasting, and the celibacy of priests.

== Writings ==
Niketas' Vita, or Life of Symeon, is the most complete biography of Symeon the New Theologian. Niketas was also the editor of Symeon's own writings and talks. An edition of Symeon's works was distributed by Niketas following a vision he had of Symeon. Niketas' personal works include polemical writings and treatises on the soul, on paradise, on the meaning of hierarchy, and on the limits of human life. He wrote an unpublished hypotyposis on the private spiritual life expected of the Stoudios monks.

Another widely read work is his treatise on ascetic practices which are contained in the fourth volume of the English editions of the Philokalia, the three Centuries on Practical, Physical and Gnostic Chapters. The titles describe three main stages on the spiritual path: praktiki (practice of the commandments); physiki (meditation on the essence of creation); gnosis (the direct knowledge of God). Niketas wrote about many of the same themes as his teacher, Symeon, including: the experience of God as divine light; the importance of having a spiritual father; love for others being more important than prayer; the responsibility of those who have direct experience of God's grace to share it with others. He also wrote that a spiritual life is possible no matter one's outer circumstances—that one doesn't have to physically withdraw from the world, and that true renunciation is an inner practice. Niketas' attitude to the spiritual life is fundamentally positive, and that true sanctity is only a return, through grace, to man's natural condition.

His most well known writings are on mystical theology—in addition to the writings in the Philokalia, they include On the Soul, On Paradise and On the Hierarchy. In his letters, he supports the views of his teacher Symeon, writing that any monk or priest who had the gift of spirit was the equal of a bishop. He also wrote a treatise Against those who accuse the saints, speaking out against a current of belief during that time which said that it was no longer possible to become a saint.

== Quotes ==
"The rays of primordial Light that illumine purified souls with spiritual knowledge not only fill them with benediction and luminosity; they also, by means of the contemplation of the inner essences of created things, lead them up to the noetic heavens. The effects of the divine energy, however, do not stop here; they continue until through wisdom and through knowledge of indescribable things they unite purified souls with the One, bringing them out of a state of multiplicity into a state of oneness in Him."
— From the Philokalia. On Spiritual Knowledge, Love and the Perfection of Living, #21.

"The Spirit is light, life and peace. If consequently you are illumined by the Spirit your own life is imbued with peace and serenity. Because of this you are filled with the spiritual knowledge of created beings and the wisdom of the Logos; you are granted the intellect of Christ (cf. 1 Cor. 2:16); and you come to know the mysteries of God's kingdom (cf. Luke 8:10). Thus you penetrate into the depths of the Divine and daily from an untroubled and illumined heart you utter words of life for the benefit of others; for you yourself are full of benediction, since you have within you Goodness itself that utters things new and old (cf. Matt. 13:52)."
— From the Philokalia. On Spiritual Knowledge, Love and the Perfection of Living, #46.

== Bibliography ==
- G. Diamantopoulos, Die Hermeneutik des Niketas Stethatos, Münchener Arbeiten zur Byzantinistik, 3, Neuried 2019.
- S. Paschalides, Against Those Who Accuse the Saints - Study with Greek text.
