= Monastery of Stoudios =

Greek Orthodox monastery in Constantinople

Coordinates: 40°59′46″N 28°55′43″E

- İmrahor İlyas Bey Camii
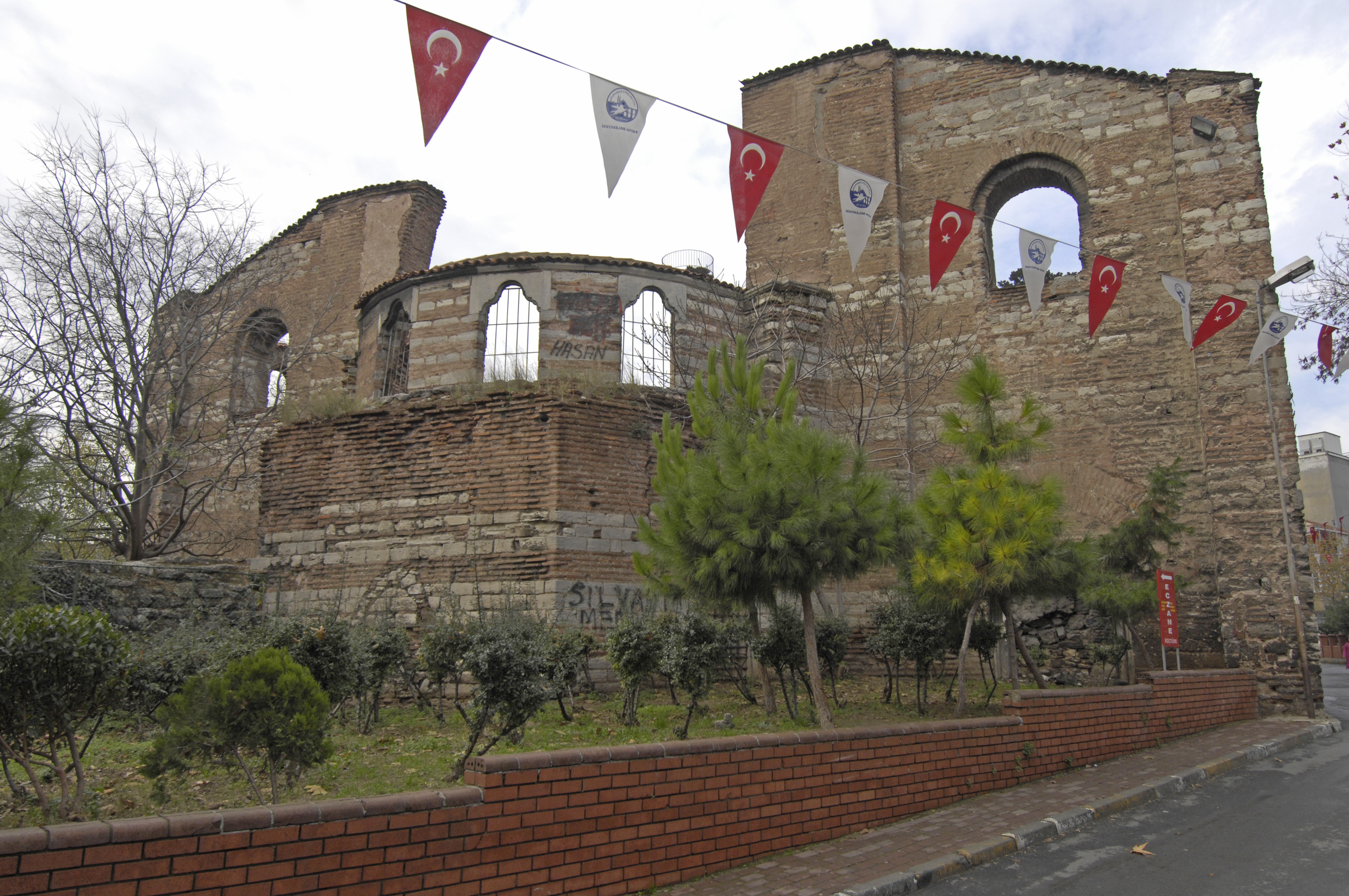
- Ruined facade of the Monastery, the apse

Religion
- Affiliation: Eastern Orthodox (originally); Sunni Islam (later)
- Ecclesiastical or organisational status: Ruined / under restoration
- Status: Inactive

Location
- Location: Istanbul, Turkey
- Interactive map of Monastery of Stoudios

Architecture
- Type: Church (originally), later mosque
- Style: Byzantine
- Founder: Flavius Studius
- Established: 5th century
- Completed: 463 AD
- Materials: Brick, stone

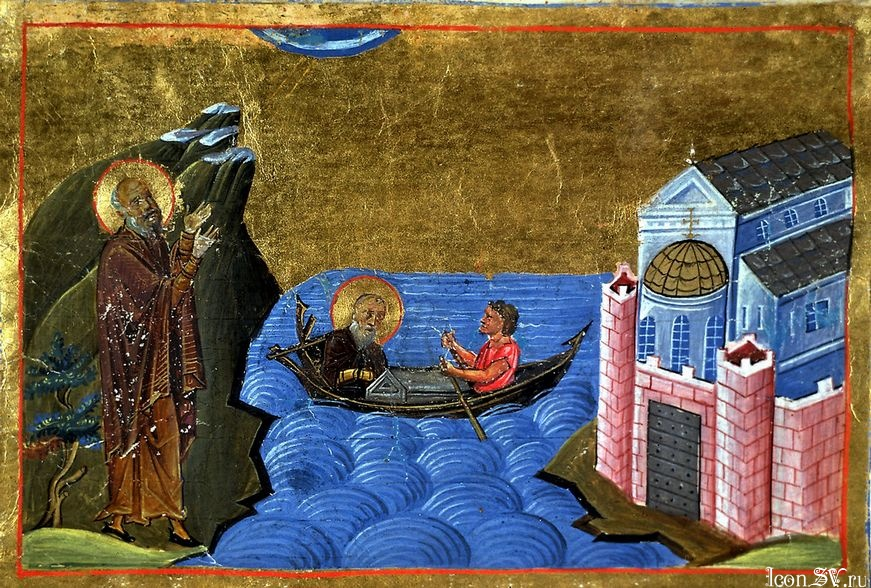
Byzantine miniature depicting the Stoudios Monastery and the Propontis (Sea of Marmara), from the Menologion of Basil II (c. 1000).

The Monastery of Stoudios, more fully Monastery of Saint John the Forerunner "at Stoudios" (Ancient Greek: Μονή του Αγίου Ιωάννη του Προδρόμου εν τοις Στουδίου, romanized: Monē tou Hagiou Iōannē tou Prodromou en tois Stoudiou), often shortened to Stoudios, Studion or Stoudion (Latin: Studium), was a Greek Orthodox monastery in Constantinople (modern-day Istanbul), the capital of the Byzantine Empire. The residents of the monastery were referred to as Stoudites or Studites. Although the monastery has been derelict for half a millennium, the laws and customs of the Stoudion were taken as models by the monks of Mount Athos and of many other monasteries of the Orthodox world; even today they have influence.

The ruins of the monastery are situated not far from the Propontis (Sea of Marmara) in the section of Istanbul called Psamathia, today's Koca Mustafa Paşa. It was founded in 462 by the consul Flavius Studius, a Roman patrician who had settled in Constantinople, and was consecrated to Saint John the Baptist. Its first monks came from the monastery of the Acoemetae. Today it is converted into the Imrahor Mosque (or Mosque of the Equerry), named after Ottoman sultan Bayezid II's equerry, Mirahor Ilias Bey.

== History ==
The Stoudites gave the first proof of their devotion to the Orthodox Faith during the schism of Acacius (484–519); they also remained loyal during the storms of iconoclastic dispute in the eighth and ninth centuries. They were driven from the monastery and the city by Emperor Constantine V (r. 741–775); after his death however, some of them returned.

Hegumenos (abbot) Sabas of Stoudios zealously defended the Orthodox doctrines against the Iconoclasts at the Second Ecumenical Council in Nicaea (787). His successor was Theodore the Studite to whom the monastery owes most of its fame, and who especially fostered academic and spiritual study. He reformed the monastery based not only on the ideas of Basil the Great, but also of Pachomios , the ascetics of the Gazan deserts (e.g. Barsanuphius, John, Dorotheus) and John Sinaites. During St. Theodore's administration also the monks were harassed and driven away several times, some of them being put to death.

Theodore's pupil, Naukratios, re-established discipline after the Iconoclastic dispute had come to an end. Hegumenos Nicholas (848-845 and 855-858) refused to recognize the Patriarch St. Photios and was on this account imprisoned in his own monastery. He was succeeded by five abbots who recognized the patriarch. The brilliant period of the Stoudios came to an end at this time.

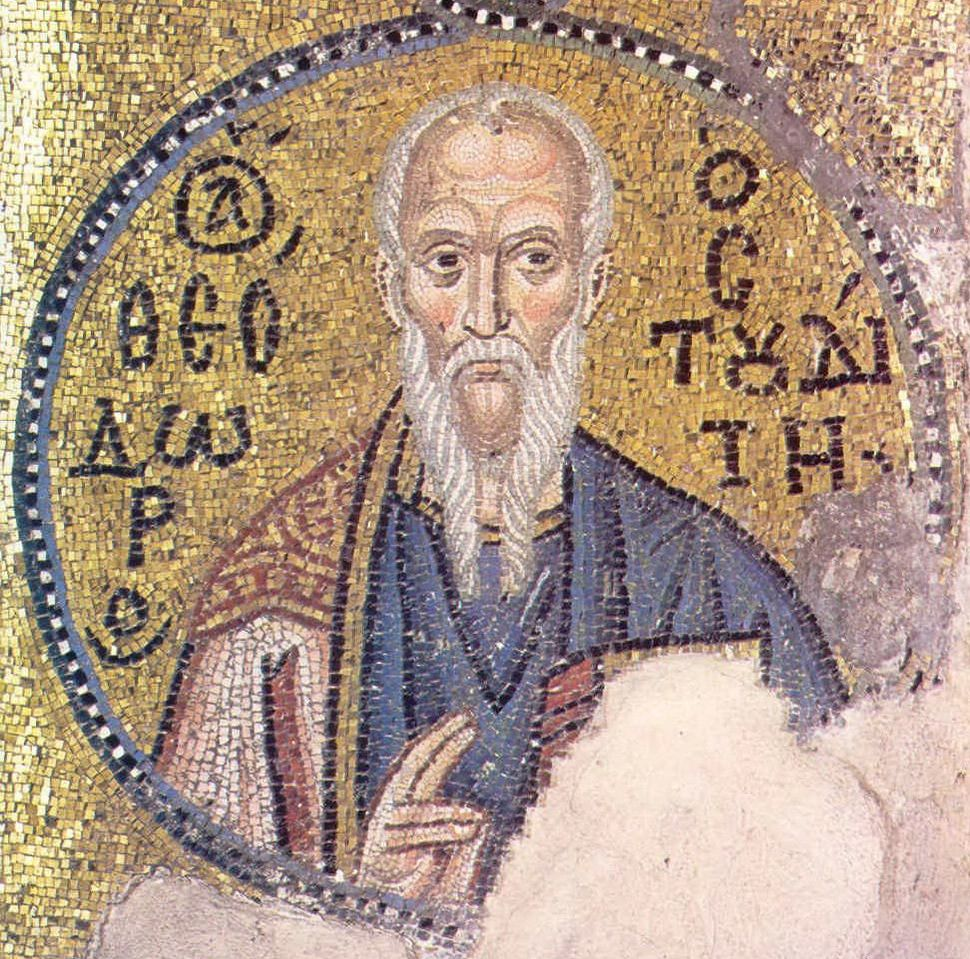
Image of St. Theodore the Studite (11th-century mosaic from Nea Moni monastery on Chios).

In the middle of the eleventh century, during the administration of Abbot Simeon, a monk named Niketas Stethatos, a disciple of Symeon the New Theologian, criticized some customs of the Latin Church in two books which he wrote on the use of unleavened bread, the Sabbath, and the marriage of priests.

As regards the intellectual life of the monastery in other directions, it is especially celebrated for its famous school of calligraphy which was established by Theodore. The art of manuscript illumination was cultivated, with many products of the monastic scriptorium now residing in Venice, Vatican City, and Moscow (e.g., Chludov Psalter). The Theodore Psalter, created at the monastery in the twelfth century is in the collection of the British Library.

In the eighth and eleventh centuries, the monastery was the centre of Byzantine religious poetry; a number of the hymns are still used in the Orthodox Church. Besides Theodore and Niketas, a number of other theological writers are known. Three of the Stoudite monks rose to become the ecumenical patriarchs; and three emperors—Michael V (r. 1041–1042), Michael VII Doukas (r. 1071–1078), and Isaac I Komnenos (r. 1057–1059)—took monastic vows in the Stoudion.

In 1204, the monastery was destroyed by the Crusaders and was not fully restored until 1290, by Constantine Palaiologos. The Russian pilgrims Anthony (c. 1200) and Stephen (c. 1350) were amazed by the size of the monastic grounds. It is thought that the cloister sheltered as many as 700 monks at the time. The monastery was damaged when the Turks conquered Constantinople in 1453.

== Modern condition ==
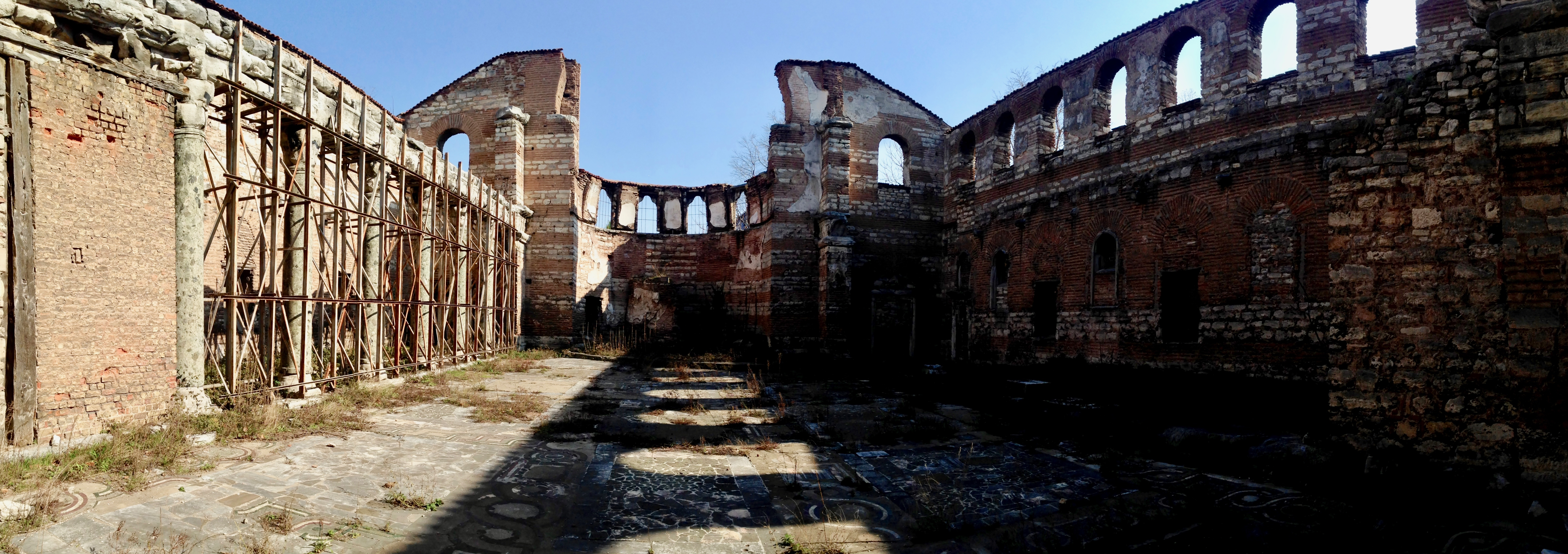
The interior of the St. John Stoudios (Imrahor) Monastery in February 2017

The 5th-century monastery's church, which has the plan of a basilica, was converted by Ottoman Sultan Bayezid II's Albanian equerry, Ilias Bey, into the mosque İmrahor Camii (literally, Mosque of the Equerry). The ancient structure sustained grave damage from the great fire of 1782; the 1894 Istanbul earthquake also contributed to its ruin.

Following the 1894 earthquake, a group of Russian Byzantinist scholars led by Fyodor Uspensky opened the Russian Archaeological Institute on the monastery grounds, but its activity was suppressed in the wake of the Russian Revolution of 1917. During the subsequent decades the ruins of the monastery complex were looted by local inhabitants to repair their houses, while the 13th century pavement still lies open to elements "and disappears slowly but steadily". In 2013 plans were announced that the church, currently a museum, was to be converted into a mosque after a restoration. It was announced in 2023 that restoration of the edifice was due to start later that year. and which has been ongoing as of January 2024.

== Gallery ==
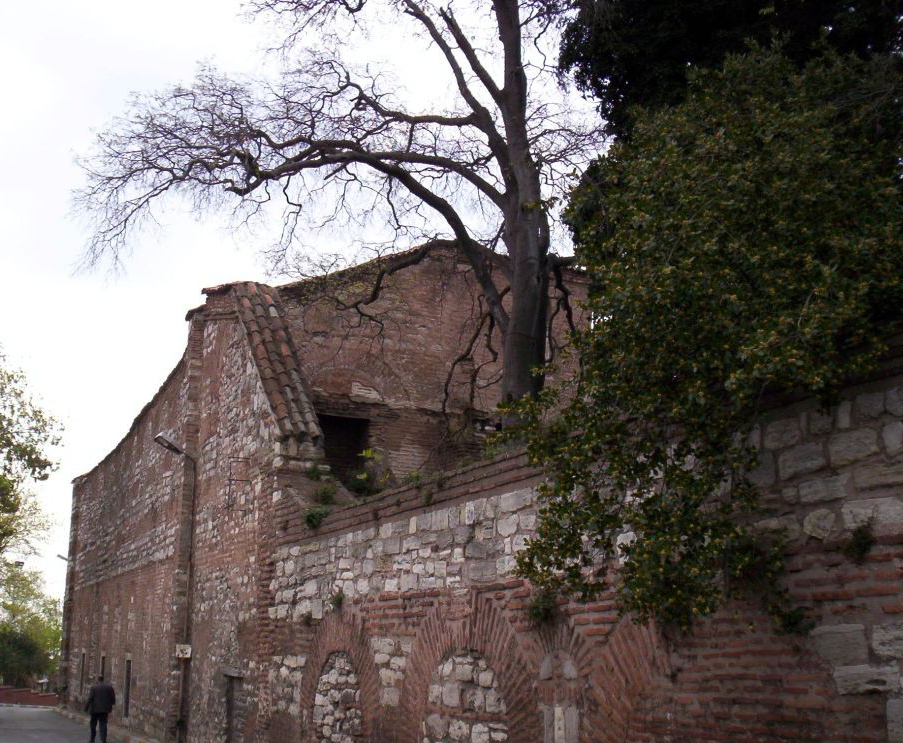
Street view of the monastery

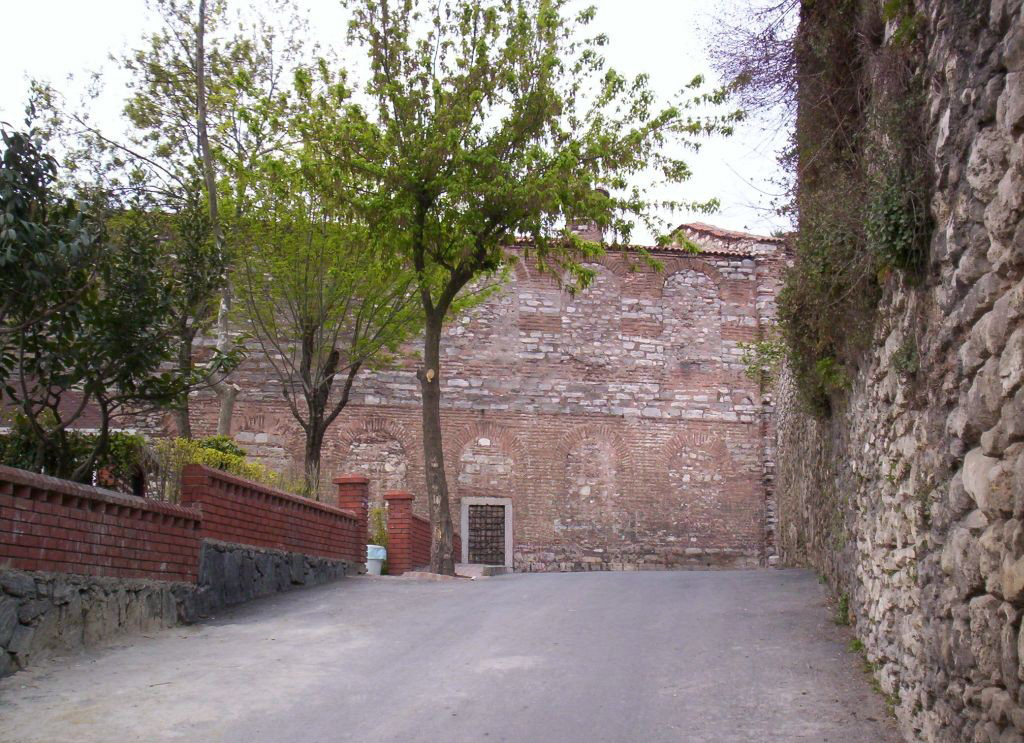
Exterior walls of the monastery

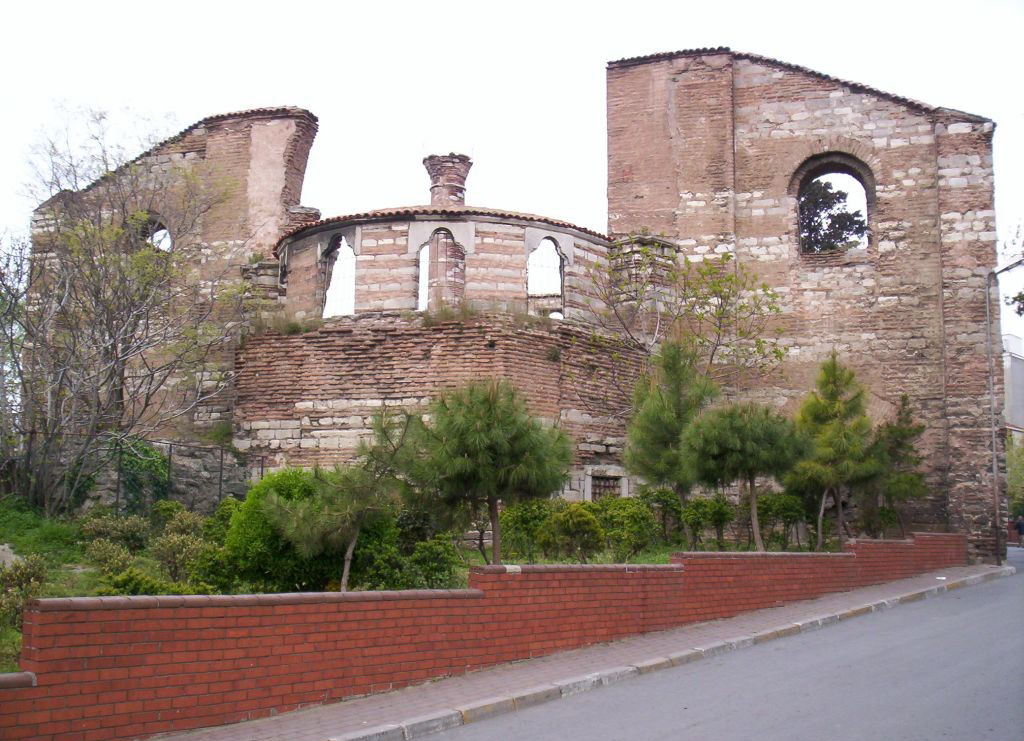
The Apsis

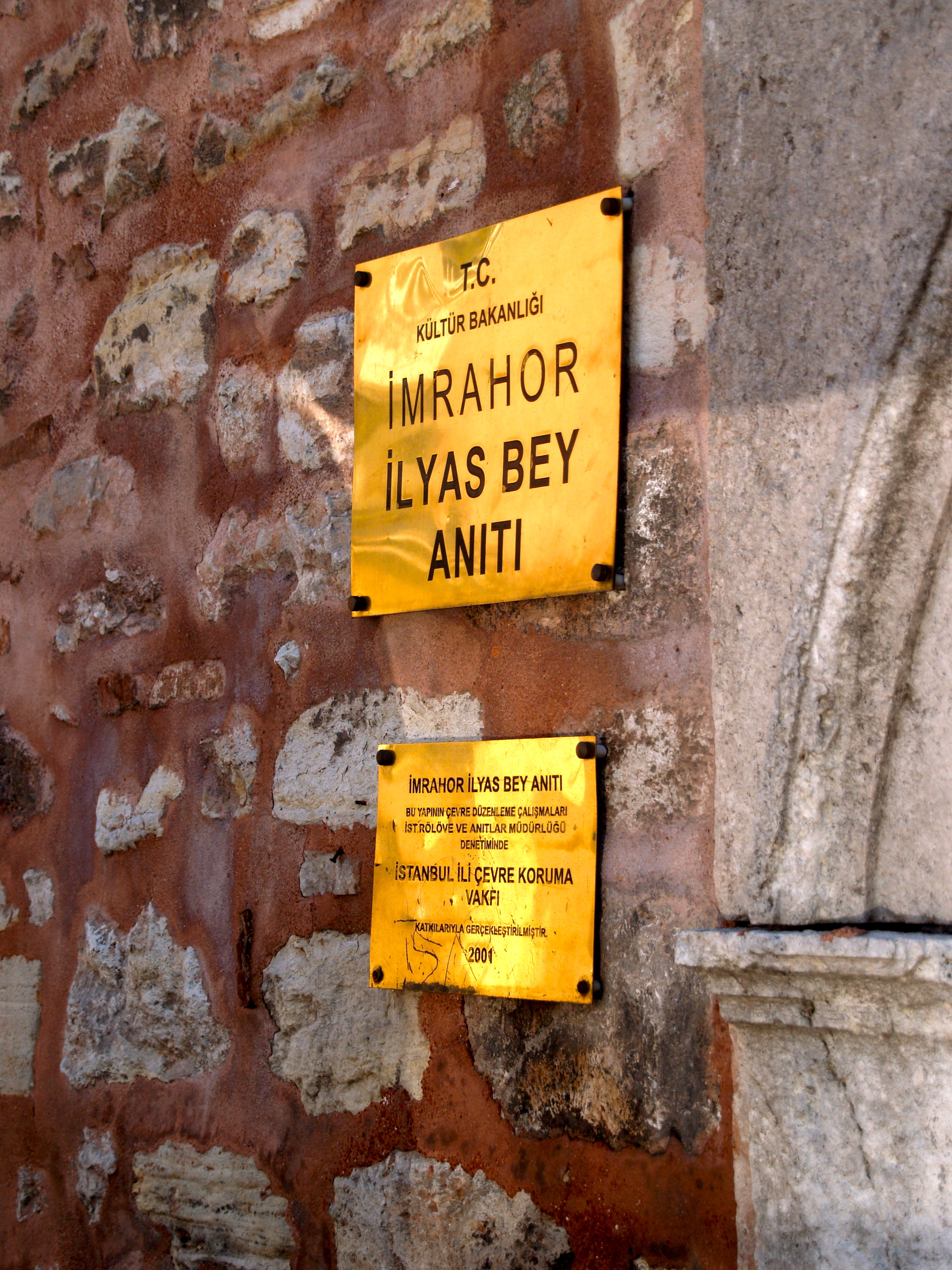
The entrance of the İmrahor İlyas Bey mosque

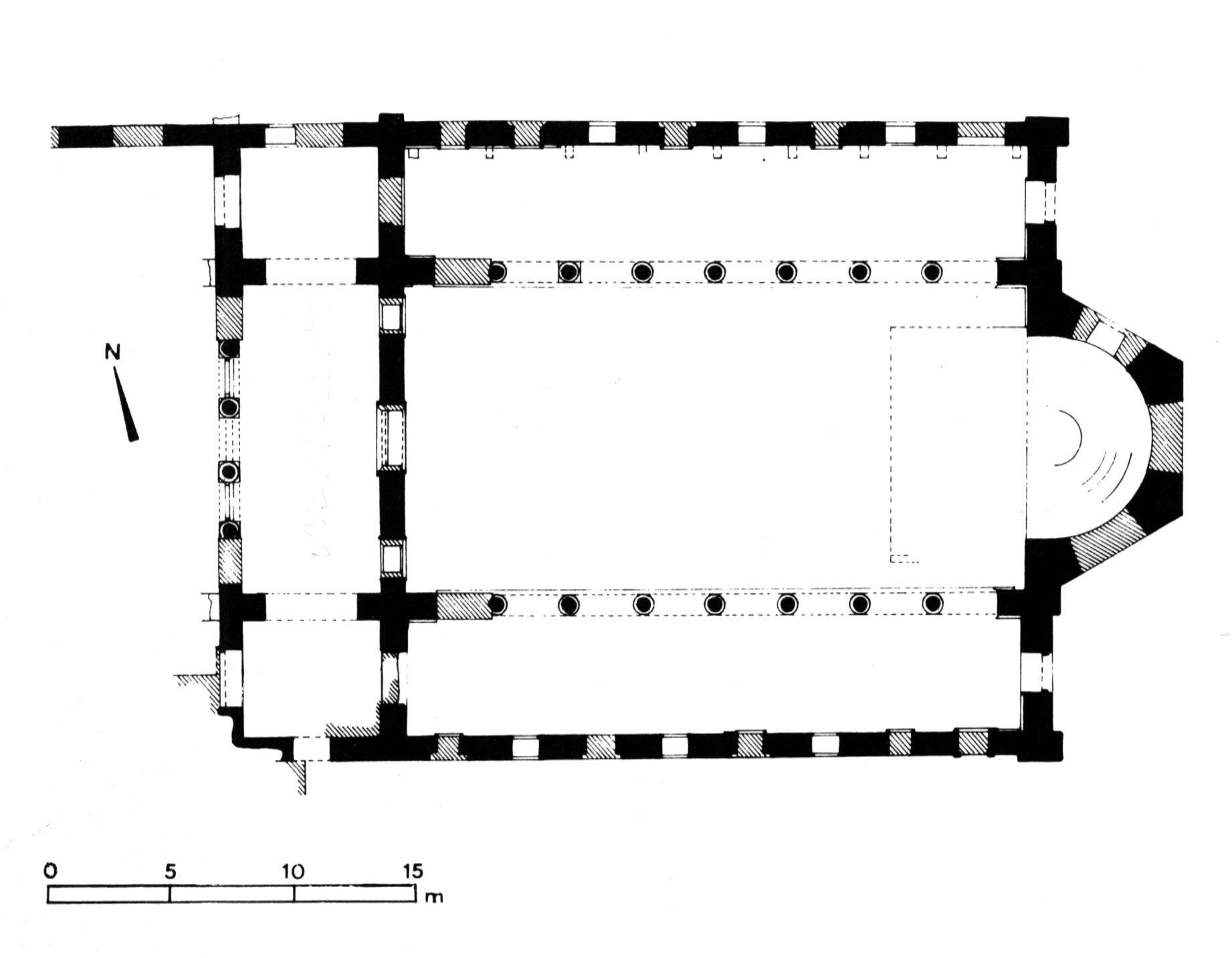
Groundplan of the monastery

== See also ==
- Degrees of Orthodox monasticism
- History of Eastern Orthodox Christianity
- Sabas of Stoudios

== Sources ==
- Official Website of the Ecumenical Patriarch | Studius
