= Kairos Prison Ministry =

Christian ministry

Kairos Prison Ministry International (KPM) is an interdenominational Christian ministry that aims to address the spiritual needs of incarcerated people and their families.

KPM has three programs: Kairos Inside, Kairos Outside and Kairos Torch.

== History ==
Kairos was founded by Tom Johnson, a Catholic cursillista, in 1976 in Raiford, Florida, as a program called Cursillo in Prison. It was based on the Cursillo movement. Referred to as a "short course in Christianity", the program spread to six US states by 1978. It was renamed "Kairos", a Greek term meaning "God's Special Time".

In 2023, the ministry is active in 39 US states and nine nations.

In 2023, KPM is registered with the Evangelical Council for Financial Accountability.

== Programs ==
KPM is composed of three programs, and attendees do not need to be Christians to participate in the events.

The programs are offered free of charge to State and Federal prisons.

=== Kairos Inside ===
Kairos Inside is a program that works inside prisons to develop a sense of Christian fellowship. It is active in both men's and women's prisons, and is conducted by volunteers of the same gender. The 3.5-day retreat includes talks, discussions, and chapel meditations.

The Kairos Inside program strives to create Christian communities inside prisons. These communities pray or share fellowship together on a regular weekly and monthly basis.

=== Kairos Outside ===
Kairos Outside is a program that ministers to female family members of the incarcerated. It offers a 2.5-day retreat that strives to create a supportive community with those navigating the incarceration of a friend or family member where women feel comfortable sharing experiences and can build relationships with others in similar situations. The retreat includes talks, music, prayer, and activities to build a supportive community.

Though the program was originally created as a support group for those whose loved ones are imprisoned, formerly-incarcerated women who were not able to attend a Kairos Inside retreat while in prison are also eligible for a Kairos Outside event.

=== Kairos Torch ===
Kairos Torch is a youth mentorship program that begins with a retreat in youth detention centers or correctional facilities for people under 25. The mission of the program is to engage the young prisoner's reasoning skills in order to help them make better life choices.

Kairos Torch volunteers commit to a weekly mentoring process with youth for six months after the retreat. The process aims to break the cycle of incarceration in a family, as most incarcerated youth have at least one parent who was also incarcerated.
