= Cursillo =

Catholic organization

Cursillos in Christianity (Spanish: Cursillos de Cristiandad; English: "Short courses of Christianity") is an apostolic movement of the Catholic Church. It was conceived in Spain between 1940 and 1949, and began with the celebration of the so-called "first course" from January 7 to 10, 1949 at the Monastery of Sant Honorat, Mallorca.

== Description ==
Cursillo is the original three-day movement, and has since been licensed for use by several mainline Protestant denominations, some of which have retained the trademarked "Cursillo" name, while others have modified its talks/methods and given it a different name. In the United States, Cursillo is a registered trademark of the National Cursillo Center in Jarrell, Texas.

The Cursillo focuses on showing Christian laity how to become effective Christian leaders over the course of a three-day weekend. The weekend includes fifteen talks, called rollos, which are given by priests and by laypeople. The major emphasis of the weekend is to ask participants to take what they have learned back into the world, on what is metaphorically termed the "fourth day." The method stresses personal spiritual development, promoted by subsequent group reunions after the initial weekend.

== History ==
Cursillos first appeared in Spain in 1944. A layman named Eduard Bonnin and group of close collaborators started celebrating them on different places on Mallorca at about one per year. When endorsed by the bishop in 1949, it picked up strength and began spreading to Spain and the rest of the world, to the point that it became an active renewal movement in the Church. In 1957, the movement had spread to North America, when the first American cursillo was held in Waco, Texas. In 1959, the Cursillo spread throughout Texas and to Phoenix, Arizona. In August of that year, the first national convention of spiritual directors was held, and Ultreya magazine began publication. In 1960, growth of the Cursillo quickened in the American Southwest, and weekends were held for the first time in the East in New York City and Lorain, Ohio.

Until 1961, all weekends were held in Spanish. That year the first English-speaking weekend was held in San Angelo, Texas. Also in 1961, first weekends were held in San Francisco, California; Gary, Indiana; Lansing, Michigan; Guaynabo, Puerto Rico; and Gallup, New Mexico. In 1962, the Cursillo Movement came to the Eastern United States. Weekends were held in Cincinnati, Brooklyn, Saginaw, Miami, Chicago, Detroit, Newark, Baltimore, Grand Rapids, Kansas City and Boston. In the West, the first weekends were held in Monterey, Sacramento, Los Angeles, Pueblo and Yakima. The movement spread rapidly with the early centers carrying the Cursillo to nearby dioceses. By 1981, almost all of the 160 dioceses in the United States had introduced the Cursillo Movement.

The Cursillo Movement in the United States was organized on a national basis in 1965. A National Secretariat was formed and the National Cursillo Office (currently in Jarrell, Texas) was established. It is joined to the United States Conference of Catholic Bishops through an official liaison in the person of Bishop Emeritus Carlos A. Sevilla S.J. from the Diocese of Yakima, and through the Bishops' Secretariat for the Laity in Washington, D.C. The spiritual advisor for the movement in the United States is Rev. Alex Waraksa from the Diocese of Knoxville, Tennessee.

In 1980, the Cursillo Movement established a worldwide international office, the OMCC (Organismo Mundial de Cursillos de Cristiandad). The international office is located in Portugal for the 2014–2017 term.

Today, Cursillo is a worldwide movement with centers in nearly all South and Central American countries, the United States, Canada, Mexico, Puerto Rico, Great Britain, Ireland, France, Spain, Portugal, Italy, Germany, Austria, Australia, New Zealand Aotearoa, Japan, Korea, Taiwan, the Philippines, Sri Lanka and in several African countries. The movement is recognized by the Holy See as member of the International Catholic Organizations of the Pontifical Council for the Laity in Rome.

== De Colores ==
In the Cursillo movement, being "in colors" is to be in God's grace. For that reason, Cursillo participants (cursillistas) greet each other with the phrase "De Colores" (in Colors).

A story from the early days of the movement in Spain tells of an occasion where a group of men were returning from a Cursillo weekend when their bus broke down. They began to sing De Colores, a traditional folk song. The use of the song in Cursillo took hold, and has held up as the movement has spread outside the Spanish-speaking world and to other denominations. The use of a multi-colored rooster as a symbol for the Cursillo movement is believed to have originated from one of the verses of that song.

== Use by other Christian denominations ==
This retreat is also used by Episcopal Cursillo Ministry (Episcopal/Anglican, Presbyterian Pilgrimage & Cursillo ( Presbyterian, Via de Cristo (Lutheran), Way of Christ (Mennonite), Walk to Emmaus (Methodist), and Tres Días (ecumenical).

== Analogous retreats ==
The Cursillo method is used by ACTS, Encounter, Antioch, Search, Awakening (college students), Cum Christo, DeColores (adult ecumenical), the Great Banquet, Happening, The Journey (United Church of Christ), Kairos Prison Ministry, Kairos (for older teenagers), Emmaus in Connecticut (for high school age teens), Gennesaret (for those living with a serious illness), Koinonia, Lamplighter Ministries, Light of Love, LOGOS (Love Of God, Others, and Self) (Lutheran teen), Teens Encounter Christ (teen ecumenical), Residents Encounter Christ (REC) (a jail/prison ministry), Tres Dias, Unidos en Cristo, Via de Cristo (Lutheran Adult), Chrysalis Flight (Methodist Youth), Walk to Emmaus (Methodist Adult), The Walk with Christ (interdenominational), Anglican 4th Day (Anglican Adult), The Way of Christ (Canadian Lutheran adult), Tres Arroyos (Charismatic Episcopal Church). and Journey to Damascus (Catholic hosted Ecumenical with weekly reunion groups for alumni) in the Corpus Christi, Houston, and Austin, TX, areas.

A derivative retreat for Catholics is called "Welcome." It is a 2-day retreat, normally Saturday and Sunday, and therefore does not qualify for the term "cursillo" meant to apply to a 3-day retreat.

Another derivative movement called 'An Emmaus Experience' was developed from the Cursillo at a Catholic parish in Miami, Florida, and has made some inroads. Its 3-day format borrows significantly from the Cursillo manual, but is primarily focused on the parish and not on the 'environments' of the world. Emmaus also has no formal method of '4th day' continuity such as the Cursillo 'friendship groups' and 'service sheets' to keep members accountable in their practice of the method. This 'Emmaus Experience' derivative movement is centered on the Roman Catholic faith (from which the Cursillo movement originated) and differs from the 'Walk to Emmaus' version which emphasizes non-denominational practices for an ecumenical audience.

== See also ==
- Manuel Aparici Navarro
