= Flavius Studius =

Ancient Roman statesman

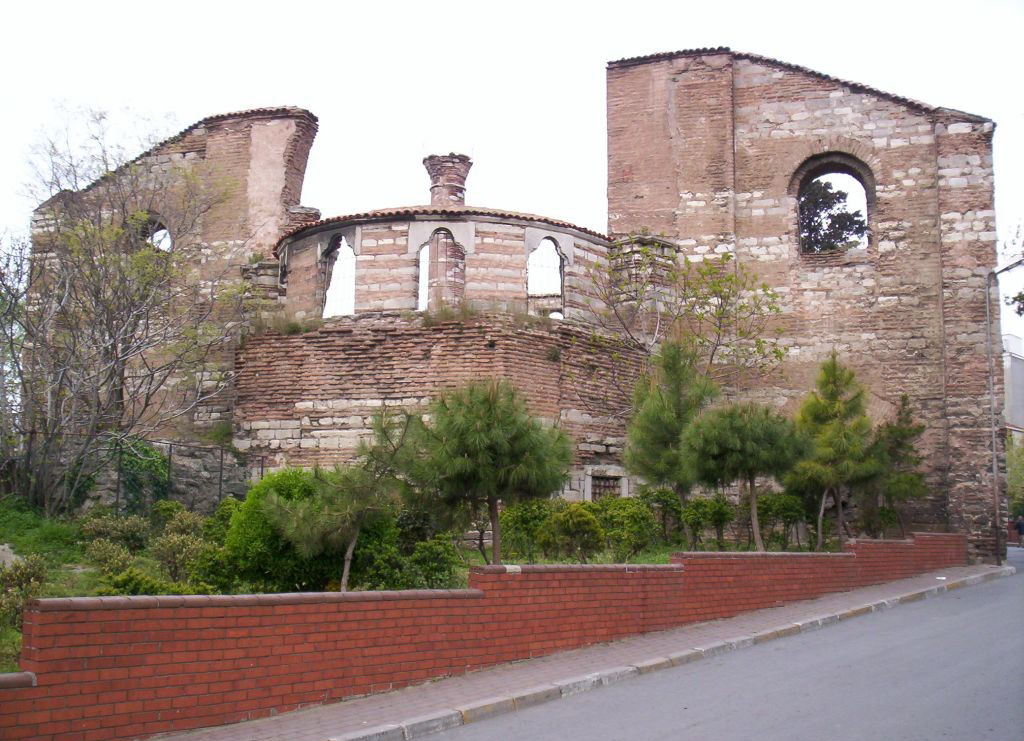
Ruins of the Monastery of Stoudios.

Flavius Studius (Greek: Φλάβιος Στούδιος; fl. 5th century AD) was a statesman of the Eastern Roman Empire.

He served as consul in 454 together with Aetius (not to be confused with the magister militum Aetius). He was a devout Christian and in 463 in Constantinople founded the Monastery of Stoudios (although he may have founded it before he became consul).

Political offices
Preceded by Rufius Opilio, Johannes Vincomalus	Roman consul 454 with Aetius	Succeeded by Placidus Valentinianus Augustus VIII, Procopius Anthemius
