= The Ascetical Homilies of Isaac the Syrian =

7th-century book on prayer and asceticism

The Ascetical Homilies; The First Part
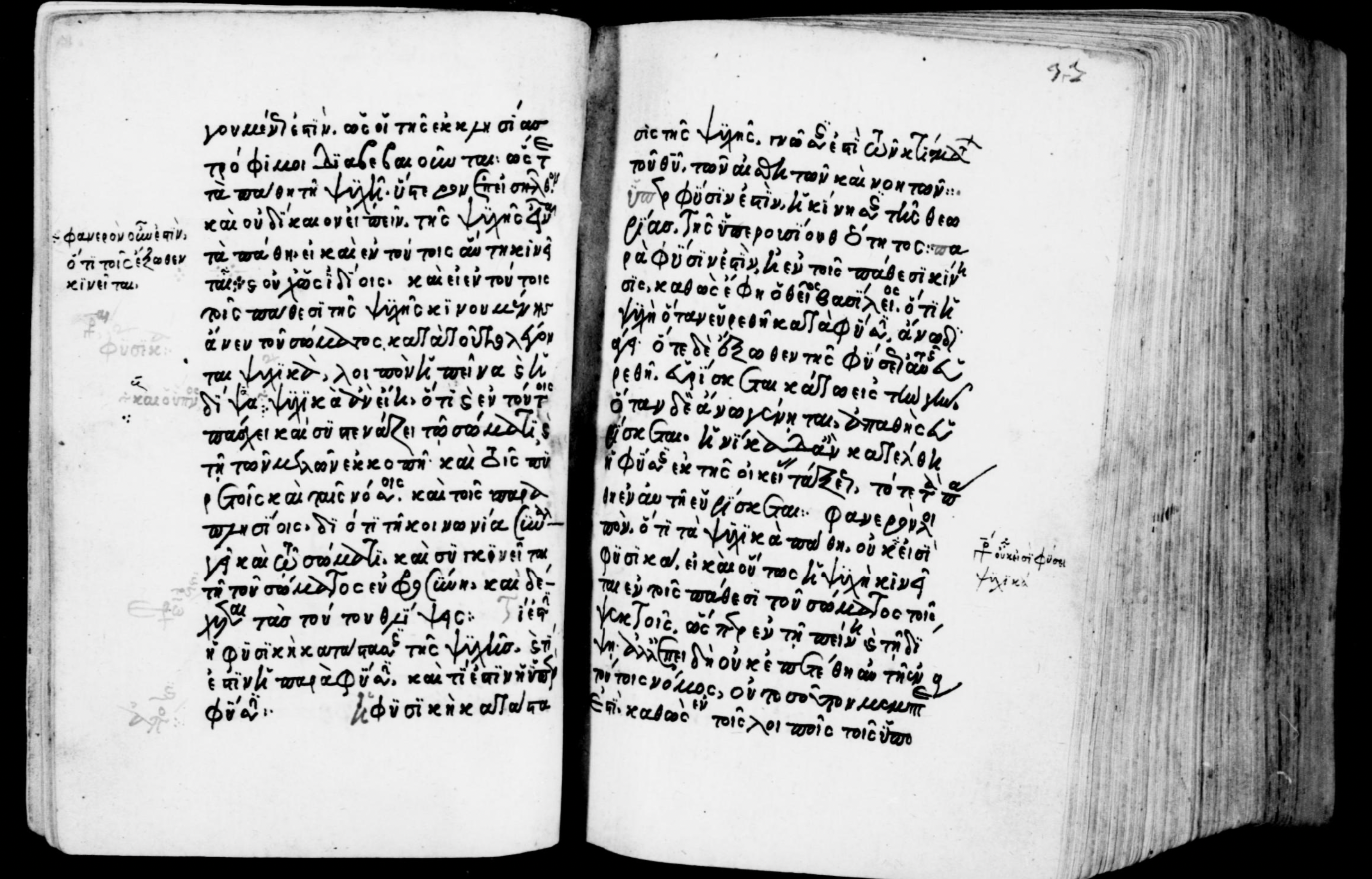
- 1374 Greek translation of Isaac the Syrian's The Ascetical Homilies (Greek Manuscripts 409). Manuscript located at Saint Catherine's Monastery, Sinai.
- Author: Isaac the Syrian
- Language: Syriac
- Genre: Prayer, asceticism
- Published: Late seventh century

The Ascetical Homilies of Isaac the Syrian, also known as the First Part, is a collection of homilies on the topic of Christian asceticism and prayer written c. 688 by Saint Isaac the Syrian.

== Structure ==
According to Abdisho bar Berika, Isaac's corpus was divided into seven volumes, or 'Parts' (Syriac ܦܠܓܘܬܐ). Of these seven 'Parts', only the First, Second, and Third Part are currently known.

Isaac's First Part circulated in East Syrian and West Syrian recensions, which contained slightly different material in different orders. Most of the First Part was translated into Greek in the late first millennium, under the title Ascetical Homilies, from a West Syrian manuscript. This ancient Greek translation also incorporated several texts which were not, in fact, written by Isaac: one by Philoxenus of Mabbug and four by John of Dalyatha. As a result of this Greek translation, the First Part has often been known under the title Ascetical Homilies in Chalcedonian Christian churches.

An English translation of the First Part was made from the original Syriac by Jan Arent Wensinck in 1923. The Holy Transfiguration Monastery in Brookline, Massachusetts has produced an English translation of the ancient Greek version of the First Part, including those texts not written by Isaac.

=== Ordering of homilies ===
Individual homilies are ordered differently in various versions of the text. The first column lists the 77 numbered homilies in the second edition of the English translation by the Holy Transfiguration Monastery (2020).

English (2020)	Western Syriac	Eastern Syriac (Bedjan)	Ancient Greek	Greek (Theotokis, 1770)	Russian
1	1	1	1	1	1
2	2	2	2	30	2
3	3	3	3–4	82–83, 44–45	3–6
4	4	4	5	23	56
5	5	5	6	5	57
6	6	6	7	56	74
7	7	7	15	22	67
8	8	8	8	21	61
9	9	9	9	41	7
10	10	10	10	70	62
11	11	11	11	10	63
12	12	12	14	11	66
13	13	13	12	14	64
14	14	14	13	15	65
15			16	43	8
16			17	2	68
17			18	7	9
18	15	15	19	9	59
19	16	16	20	13	69
20	17	17	21	29	70
21	18	18	22	75–79	10–14
22	19	20–21			
23	20	22	23	31–32	15–16
24	21	23			
25	22	24			
26	23	25	26	67	17
27	24	26			
28	25	27	27	84	18
29	26	28	28	74	19
30	27	29			
31			29	80	20
32	28	30	24	42, 55	71
33	29	31			
34	30	32	30	68	72
35	31	33	31	24	73
36	32	34	32	16	74
37	33	35	33	85	21
38	end of 33	end of 35	34	47	22
39	34	36	25	51–54	60
40	35–36	37–38	35	26	75–76
41	36	38	36	27	77
42	37	39	37	46	78–79
43	38	40	38	17	80–81
44	39	41	39	Epistle 1	23
45	40	42	40	Epistle 2	24
46	41	43	41	72	82–83
47	42	44	42	18	84
48	43–44	45–46	43	73	85
49	45	47	44	39–40	86–87
50	46	48	46	57	88
51	47	50	47–48	58, 60	89–90
52	48	51	49	62–65	25–28
53	49	52	53	66	29
54	50	53	54–55	33, 3	30–31
55	51	55	56	61	32
56	52	57	58	25	91
57	53	58	59	37	34
58	54	64	57	59	33
59	55	59	60	4	35
60	56	60	61	36	36
61	57	61	62	48	37
62	58	62	63	38	38
63	59	63	64	35	39
64	60	65	65	34	40–41
65	61	66	66	Epistle 3	42
66	62–63	67–68	67	69	43
67	64	69	68	12	44
68	65	70	69	8	45
69	66	72	70	49	46
70	67	73	71	50	47
71	68	74	72	81	48
72	69	77	73	19	49
73	70	78	74	6	50
74	71	79	75	71	51
75	72	80	76	28	52
76	74	81	78, 79	86, Epistle 4	54, 55
77	73	82	77	20	53
A.1 (Note: Appendix A, Homily 1)		19			
A.2		49			
A.3		54			
A.4		56			
A.5		71			
A.6		75			
A.7		76			

== Content ==
The Ascetical Homilies were written primarily for an audience of monastics in the Church of the East, although the book has proved beneficial to both laity and tonsured. As Kallistos Ware says, "[Isaac's writings] are addressed not just to the desert but to the city, not just to monastics but to all the baptized. With sharp vividness he speaks about themes relevant to every Christian: about repentance and humility, about prayer in its many forms, both outer and inner, about solitude and community, about silence, wonder, and ecstasy." In the book, Isaac teaches the process of purification through ascetic labors, especially that of stillness and wakefulness, using frequent references to both scripture and earlier Church Fathers. He writes from practical experience as an anchorite in the desert, rather than in merely conceptual terms.

Isaac has been honored as a spiritual guide throughout history, as is evidenced by the numerous translations of his works. According to Sebastian Brock, Isaac is "indubitably one of the most profound writers on spirituality produced by the Syriac Churches." Donald Allchin goes even further, calling Isaac "one of the greatest spiritual writers of the Christian East." Furthermore, Joseph the Hesychast once said, "If all the writings of the desert fathers which teach us concerning watchfulness and prayer were lost and the writings of Abba Isaac the Syrian alone survived, they would suffice to teach one from beginning to end concerning the life of stillness and prayer."

Throughout his writings, Isaac the Syrian emphasizes the necessity of stillness for purification (see Homilies 1, 4, 19, and 48). (Note: Homily numbering according to The Ascetical Homilies of Saint Isaac the Syrian. Holy Transfiguration Monastery (2020).) Nonetheless, he also recognized the different roles within the body of the Church (i.e. that of hierarchs, clergy, monastics, and laymen) and their different abilities to adhere to strict stillness and ascetic practice. In Homily 4, he says, "Yet if there be someone who cannot practice stillness—since it is the grace of God that brings a man within the door—let him not forsake the other way, lest by doing so he have no share in either of the paths of life." And again, in Homily 72, "But lo, the majority of men to not attain such innocency... For in all the measures of every way upon which each man journeys to Him, God opens before him the gate of the Kingdom of the Heavens."

According to Isaac, God's love cannot be overcome by sin or by the powers of evil. In his view, the Incarnation occurred because of both this love and because of the need created by mankind's sins.

=== Influences ===
In writing The Ascetical Homilies, Isaac the Syrian was influenced by the spiritual and theological work of Evagrius, Theodore of Mopsuestia, Dionysius the Areopagite, and John the Solitary, though chiefly by Evagrius. The Evagrian emphasis on the importance of scripture can be seen in The Ascetical Homilies, where Isaac often quotes and interprets verses. In the 7th-century Church of the East in general, schools of exegesis were created not only for monastics and clergy, but for laity as well. It was at these schools that they could learn to read, write, and memorize scripture.

== Reception ==
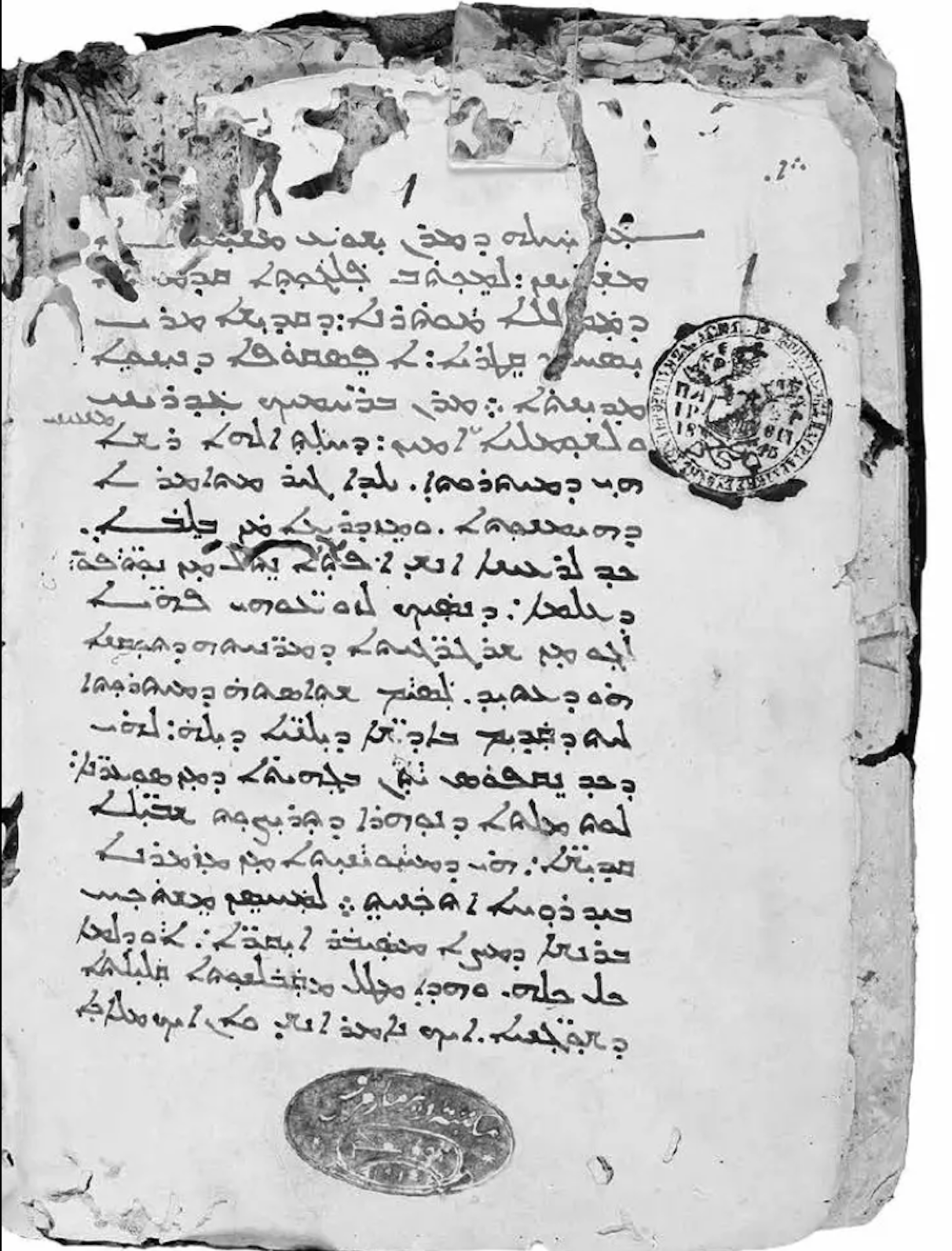
Manuscript 181 of a Syriac translation of The Ascetical Homilies, located at the Monastery of Saint Mark in Jerusalem. (Note: For a detailed study of the Syriac manuscripts, see The Manuscript Heritage of Isaac of Nineveh: A Survey of Syriac Manuscripts by Grigory Kessel.)

A renewed interest in The Ascetical Homilies of Isaac the Syrian has emerged in the twentieth century. Nevertheless, Isaac's writings have been held in high esteem within Eastern Christian literature for centuries. Yuhanna ibn Bukhtishu (c. 9th century) said that Isaac spoke "the language of the heavenly ones." Explaining the purpose of his writings, Isaac says, "I now compose this homily for the kindling and enlightenment of our souls, and of those who come across it, with the hope that, perchance, some might rouse themselves by reason of their desire for what I speak of, and endeavor to practice it." (Homily 23). (Note: See Note 1.)

A beloved spiritual classic in Russia, frequent mention is made of The Ascetical Homilies in The Way of a Pilgrim. The Russian author Fyodor Dostoevsky owned an 1858 translation of Isaac's writings, and consequently mentions them twice in The Brothers Karamazov. This demonstrates the cultural importance of the book in 19th-century Russia. Yet not only were the homilies famous in Eastern Europe, but also in Western Europe. It is documented that Queen Mary of Aragon (1401–1458) owned two copies of the Catalan translation. Notably, Christopher Columbus' son Hernando Columbus possessed a copy of the same translation, and it was likely taken by the translator (a companion of Columbus), Bernardo Buil, on Columbus' second voyage. If this is true, it could arguably make Isaac's The Ascetical Homilies one of the first books brought to the New World.

The Ascetical Homilies are directly quoted in the Evergetinos, in the Life of Saint Cyril of Philea, and in the Philokalia by Peter of Damascus. (Note: For a complete text of the Philokalia, see volume four of The Philokalia: The Complete Text compiled by St. Nikodimos of the Holy Mountain and St. Makarios of Corinth. Translated by Palmer, G. E. H.; Sherrard, Phillip; Ware, Kallistos. London: Faber and Faber. 1984.) The book was also read and quoted by many of the hesychastic writers of the 14th century, such as Gregory Palamas. Contemporary spiritual teachers such as Orthodox Saints Ieronymos of Aegina, Nilus of Sora, Joseph the Hesychast, Paisios the Athonite, Evmenios Saridakis, and Seraphim of Sarov attest to the great spiritual wisdom of Isaac the Syrian in The Ascetical Homilies.

=== Criticism ===
Isaac's writings initially received some backlash, as the Church historian Isho'dnah recorded. According to him, Daniel Bar Tubanitha, the Bishop of Beth Garmai c. the 7th century, found fault with three propositions in Isaac's writings, though it is unknown whether these propositions are found in the First Part or elsewhere in Isaac's corpus.

More recently, the reception of The Ascetical Homilies has been affected by the establishment of the fact that Isaac was a member of the Church of the East. However, as Eric Jobe wrote, "...even if we acknowledge, as scholars unanimously do, that St. Isaac was the Eastern bishop of Nineveh, this does not necessitate that he had a thoroughly Nestorian Christology." According to Kallistos Ware, "Cut off by language and politics from the Churches of the Roman Empire and branded Nestorian, the Church of the East produced in isolation a rich theological literature which is only now becoming known to outsiders. Yet over the centuries and in all parts of Christendom, Isaac's works have been read and recommended as unquestionably orthodox." Some scholars, such as Alexei Sidorov, argue that there was a pro-Chalcedonian (and anti-Nestorian) movement within the Churches of the East at that time, and that Isaac could very well have been a proponent of this Chalcedonian Christology.

=== Translations ===
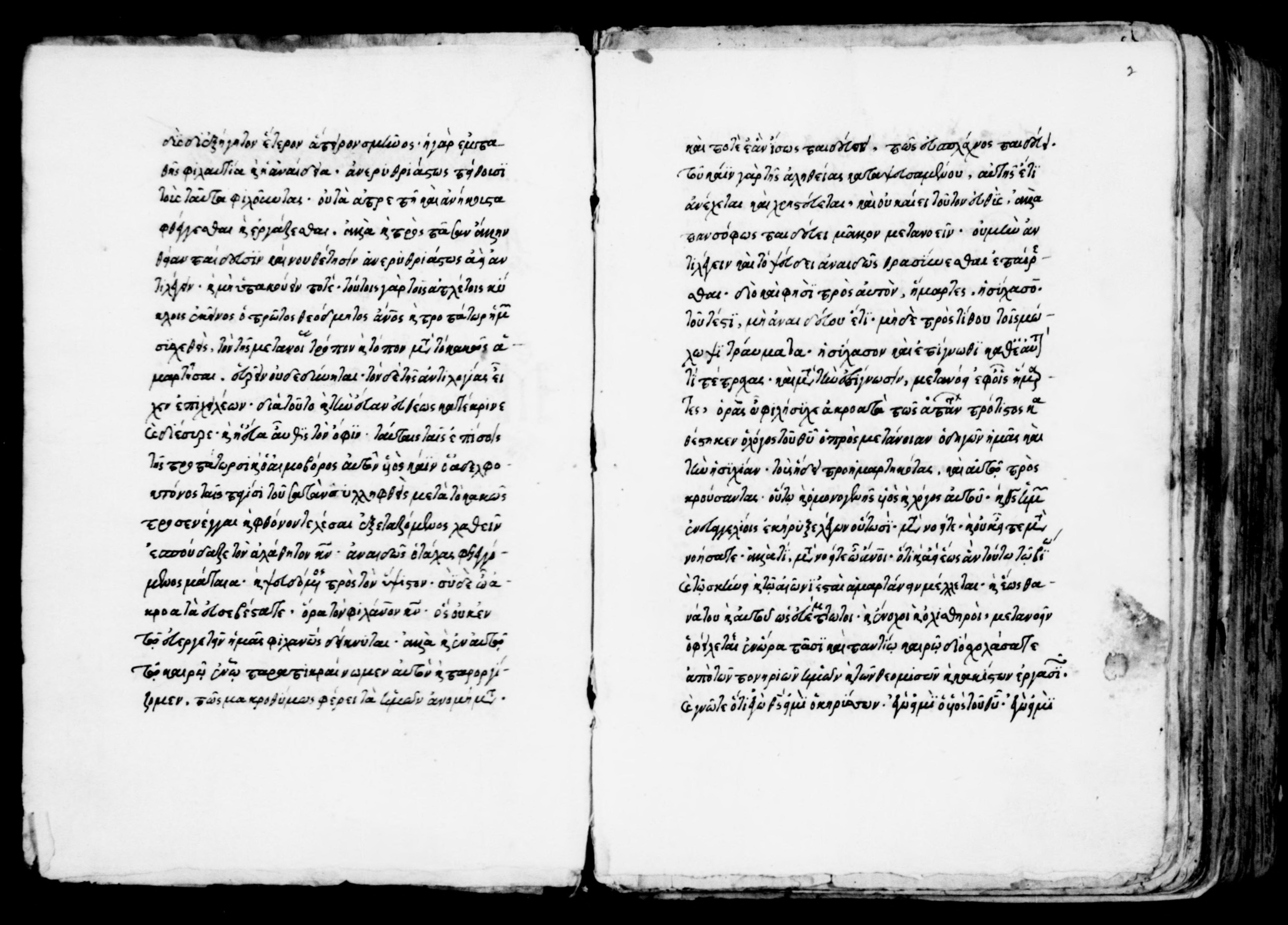
1371 Greek translation of Isaac the Syrian's The Ascetical Homilies (Greek Manuscripts 408). Manuscript located at Saint Catherine's Monastery, Sinai.

Within a hundred years of Isaac's death, his The Ascetical Homilies were already famous, and were referred to and quoted from in Syriac literature. They were translated from a West Syriac manuscript into Greek at Mar Saba monastery by Abbas Patrick and Abramius, then from Greek into Arabic, Georgian (by Euthymius the Athonite) and Latin (and subsequently into French, Italian, Catalan, Castilian, and Portuguese), and finally into Amharic and Slavonic. The first Slavonic translator may have been a disciple of Gregory of Sinai. The oldest known manuscript of the Latin translation is in the Laurentian Library in Florence and dates from the 13th century. In the last two centuries, The Ascetical Homilies were also translated into German, English, Japanese, Malayalam, and Persian. Some notable full translations (as opposed to fragmentary manuscripts) are:

- Georgian translation by Euthymius the Athonite (9th century)
- Latin edition printed in Barcelona (1497)
- Castilian translation by Bernardo Buil (15th century)
- Greek printed edition by Nikephoros Theotokis (1770)
- Slavonic translation by Paisius Velichkovsky (1812)
- Russian translation by Sergei Sobolevsky (19th century)
- Syriac text transcribed by Paul Bedjan (1909)
- English translation by A. J. Wensinck (1923)
- Modern Greek translation by Kallinikos of the Monastery of Pantokrator (1961)
- Modern French translation by Jacques Touraille Desclée de Brouwer (1981)
- Italian translation by Gallo & Bettiolo (1984) (Discourses 1-38)
- English translation by Hansbury (1989) (Discourses 1-6)
- Modern French translation by Placide Deseille Monastère Saint-Antione-Le-Grand & Monastère de Solan (2006)
- English translation by Holy Transfiguration Monastery (1984; revised 2nd edition 2020)
- Italian translation by Artioli (2018) (68 discourses; also contains the original Greek text)
- Italian translation by Chialà (2021) (82 discourses)

== Manuscripts ==
The following manuscripts were used by the Holy Transfiguration Monastery (2020) editors to establish the Greek and West Syriac texts used for their English translation. (Note: Homily numbering (1–77) according to The Ascetical Homilies of Saint Isaac the Syrian. Holy Transfiguration Monastery (2020).)

Manuscript	Language	Date	No. of folios	No. of homilies	Notes
Paris 693	Greek	9th century	78	16	end of Homily 1–middle of Homily 16
Paris 390	Greek	10th century	182	30	Homilies 3–51
Mar Sabbas 157	Greek	10th century	229		30 folios contain a selection of 10 homilies (Homilies 4–38).
Lavra 335	Greek	late 10th century	68	26	Homilies 4–47
Koutloumousiou 12	Greek	11th century	242		The first 90 folios contain 27 homilies (Homilies 4–57).
Sinai 405	Greek	11th or 12th century	258	37	From Homily 38 to the Epistle to Abba Symeon.
Mar Sabbas 407	Greek	12th or 13th century	423		157 folios contain all but 8 of the homilies.
Vatican 605	Greek	1326	280		Contains all but 3 of the homilies. This MS most resembles the 1770 Greek printed text by Nikephoros Theotokis.
Hagios Stavros 79	Greek	14th century	200	29	Homilies 3–37
Sinai 406	Greek	14th century	190	37	From Homily 38 to the Epistle to Abba Symeon
Sinai 408	Greek	1371	300		The first 283 folios contain all the homilies.
Sinai 409	Greek	1374	501		Contains all the homilies. Its text is identical to Sinai 408.
Sinai Syriac 24	West Syriac	9th or 10th century	216		The first 129 folios contain Homilies 21–70.
Vatican Syriac 124	West Syriac	14th century	350		The first 273 folios contain all the homilies.

== Selected quotations ==
The following quotations are from The Ascetical Homilies of Saint Isaac the Syrian by the Holy Transfiguration Monastery (1984).

- Love sinners, but hate their works; and do not despise them for their faults, lest you be tempted by the same trespasses. (Homily 5, p. 167)
- Just as the dolphin stirs and swims about when the visible sea is still and calm, so also, when the sea of the heart is tranquil and still from wrath and anger, mysteries and divine revelations are stirred in her at all times to delight her. (Homily 15, p. 204)
- Stillness mortifies the outward senses and resurrects the inward movements, whereas agitation does the opposite, that is, it resurrects the outward senses and deadens the inward movements. (Homily 37, p. 303)
- What is the sign that a man has attained to purity of heart, and when does a man know that his heart has entered into purity? When he sees all men as good and none appears to him to be unclean and defiled, then in truth, his heart is pure. (Homily 37, p. 305)
- Until we find love, our labor is in the land of tares, and in the midst of tares we both sow and reap, even if our seed is the seed of righteousness. (Homily 46, p. 358)
- A serpent guards its head when its body is being crushed, and a wise monk guards his faith at all times, for this is the origin of his life. (Homily 48, p. 366)

== Modern English publications ==
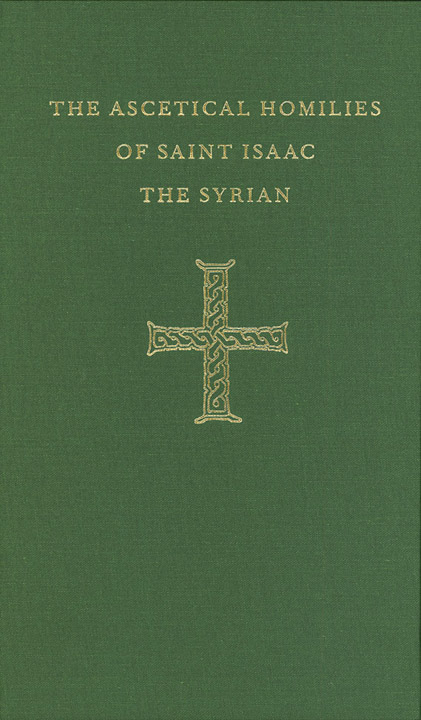
Front cover of the Ascetical Homilies, translated and published by Holy Transfiguration Monastery in English (2011).

The following is a list of books which either contain the works of Isaac the Syrian, in whole or part, or which discuss his writings.

Translations

- Brock, Sebastian (translator). 2022. Headings on Spiritual Knowledge: The Second Part, Chapters 1–3. ISBN 9780881417029.
- Brock, Sebastian (translator). 1995. Isaac of Nineveh (Isaac the Syrian): The Second Part, Chapters 4–41. ISBN 9789068317091.
- Brock, Sebastian (translator). 2011. The Prayers of St. Isaac the Syrian. ISBN 9780971413979.
- Brock, Sebastian (translator). 2006. The Wisdom of Saint Isaac the Syrian: A Bilingual Edition. ISBN 9781593333355.
- Bedjan, Paul (translator). 2007. The Ascetical Homilies of Mar Isaac of Nineveh. In Syriac. ISBN 9781593333898.
- Hansbury, Mary T. 1989. St. Isaac of Nineveh on Ascetical Life: English and Syriac Edition. ISBN 9780881410778.
- Hansbury, Mary T. 2016. Isaac the Syrian's Spiritual Works. ISBN 9781463205935.
- The Ascetical Homilies of Saint Isaac the Syrian. Holy Transfiguration Monastery. 1984. ISBN 9780913026557.
- The Ascetical Homilies of Saint Isaac the Syrian, Revised Second Edition. Holy Transfiguration Monastery. 2011. ISBN 9780943405162.
- Wensinck, A. J. (translator). 1923. Mystical Treatises by Isaac of Nineveh: Translated From Bedjan's Syriac Text With An Introduction And Registers. ISBN 9781479115815.

Studies

- Alfeyev, Hilarion. 2016. The Spiritual World of Isaac the Syrian. ISBN 9780879077754.
- Allchin, A. M. 1989. The Heart of Compassion: Daily Readings with St. Isaac of Syria. ISBN 9780232518061.
- Brock, Sebastian. 1999. "From Qatar to Tokyo, by way of Mar Saba: The Translations of Isaac of Beth Qatraye (Isaac the Syrian)" in ARAM Periodical. Vol 11–12.
- Brock, Sebastian. 2009. Discerning the Evagrian in the Writings of Isaac of Nineveh: A Preliminary Investigation.
- Duca, Valentina, 'Exploring Finitude' - Weakness and Integrity in Isaac of Nineveh (Peeters, 2022).
- Hagman, Patrick, The Asceticism of Isaac of Nineveh (Oxford University Press, 2010) ISBN 9780199593194.
- Kavvadas, Nestor, Isaak von Ninive und seine Kephalaia Gnostika (Brill, 2015).
- Scully, Jason, Isaac of Nineveh’s Ascetical Eschatology (Oxford University Press, 2017).
- Vesa, Valentin, Knowledge and Experience in the Writings of St. Isaac of Nineveh (Gorgias Press, 2018).

== See also ==
- Eastern Christian monasticism
- Christianity in Syria
- Ascetical theology
- Hesychasm
- Nous

== Works cited ==
- Alfeyev, Hilarion (2000). The Spiritual World of Isaac The Syrian. Liturgical Press. ISBN 9780879077754.
- Allchin, Arthur Macdonald (1990). The Heart of Compassion: Daily Readings with St. Isaac of Syria. Translated by Brock, Sebastian. Springfield, Illinois: Templegate. ISBN 9780232518061.
- Brock, Sebastian (2011). "Syriac into Greek at Mar Saba: The Translation of St. Isaac the Syrian". In Patrich, Joseph (ed.). The Sabaite Heritage in the Orthodox Church from the Fifth Century to the Present. Peeters Publishers. ISBN 9042909765. OCLC 49333502.
- Brock, Sebastian (1987). The Syriac Fathers on Prayer and the Spiritual Life. Kalamazoo, Michigan: Cistercian. ISBN 9780879079017.
- Chialà, Sabino (2014). Kozah, Mario; Abu-Husayn, Abdulrahim; Al-Murikhi, Saif Shaken; Al Thani, Haya (eds.). The Syriac Writers of Qatar in the Seventh Century. Piscataway, New Jersey: Gorgias Press. ISBN 9781463203559.
- Hansbury, Mary (2014). Kozah, Mario; Abu-Husayn, Abdulrahim; Al-Murikhi, Saif Shaken; Al Thani, Haya (eds.). The Syriac Writers of Qatar in the Seventh Century. Piscataway, New Jersey: Gorgias Press. ISBN 9781463203559.
- Hieromonk Isaac (2016). Saint Paisios of Mount Athos. The Holy Monastery of Saint Arsenios the Cappadocian. ISBN 9789608976450.
- Holy Transfiguration Monastery (2020). The Ascetical Homilies of Saint Isaac the Syrian (Revised 2nd ed.). Brookline, Massachusetts: Holy Transfiguration Monastery Publications. ISBN 9780943405162.
- Holy Transfiguration Monastery Publications (2012). "Inside our Books and the Sources Behind Them". Holy Transfiguration Monastery Publications. Brookline, Massachusetts.
- Jobe, Eric (15 October 2014). "Will the "Real" St. Isaac of Nineveh Please Stand Up". Eclectic Orthodoxy.
- Kessel, Grigory (2014). Kozah, Mario; Abu-Husayn, Abdulrahim; Al-Murikhi, Saif Shaken; Al Thani, Haya (eds.). The Syriac Writers of Qatar in the Seventh Century. Piscataway, New Jersey: Gorgias Press. ISBN 9781463203559.
- Terras, Victor (1981). A Karamazov Companion: Commentary on the Genesis, Language, and Style of Dostoevsky’s Novel. University of Wisconsin. ISBN 9780299083144.
