= Peter of Damascus =

Christian saint and Church Father

Peter of Damascus; Πέτρος του Δαμασκηνοῦ; Peter Damaskinos – Peter Damascene
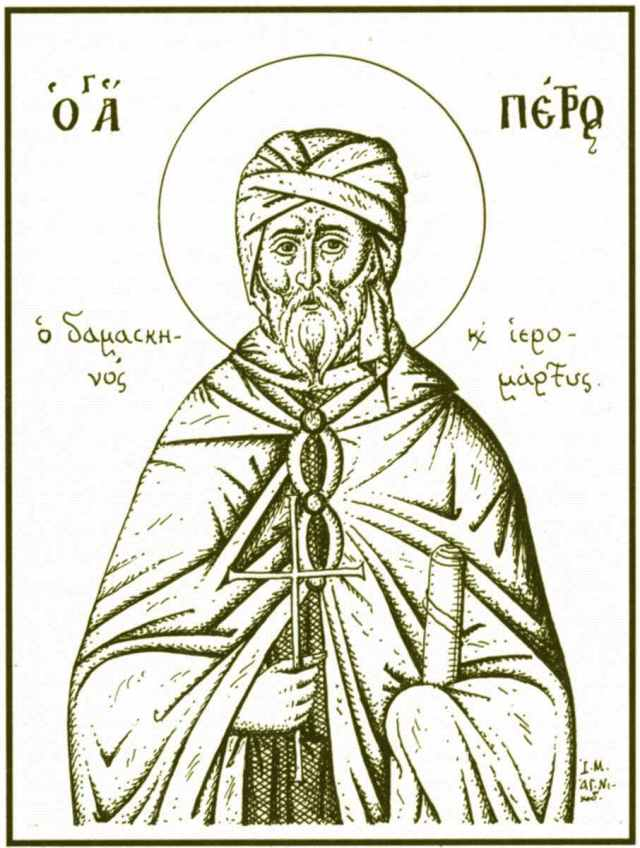
- A Russian icon

Church Father; Theologian
- Born: c. 1156
- Honored in: Eastern Orthodox Church; Melkite Catholic and other Eastern Catholic Churches
- Feast: 9 February
- Major works: Two major books collected in volume three of the Philokalia

Peter of Damascus (Greek: Πέτρος του Δαμασκηνοῦ) or Peter Damascene was an Eastern Christian monastic, theologian, and Church Father who lived in the 12th century. He is notable for being the second most voluminous author in the Philokalia.

== Biography ==
Little is known about the life of Peter of Damascus, partly due to the lack of a hagiographical account of his life and partly due to his confusion with another Peter of Damascus who lived some 400 years earlier. This confusion is present in volume three of the Philokalia in which Nicodemus the Hagiorite misattributes Damascene's writings to an 8th-century martyr, Peter the Bishop of Damascus. This earlier Peter is also called "the Damascene" and is a saint in the Eastern and Western traditions; the feast days of both bishop and monk are commemorated on 9 February.

The Peter of Damascus in question lived in the 12th century during the climax of monastic reform within Byzantium. He was a monk, as is attested to by his own words, using such phrases as "us monks", speaking about his "monastic habit" and describing himself as a "fully-tested monk". Furthermore, Peter mentions in his writings that he lived in a cell, never owned any books or possessions, and was under the guidance of a spiritual father. Peter himself identifies three types of monastic life; cenobitic, eremitic, and semi-eremitic. While it is not known for certain in which style of monasticism he lived or where he was from, the textual evidence suggests that he likely followed the semi-eremitic lifestyle. The title "of Damascus" does not necessarily mean that Peter was born in Damascus—as is the case with the more famous John of Damascus.

It is generally thought that Peter wrote his works c. 1156–1157 AD. This timeframe comes from a 13th-century manuscript in the Vatican and a 14th-century manuscript in Paris which agree. Additionally, Peter mentions Symeon the Metaphrast in his writings (who died in the last quarter of the tenth century) which means that he at least must have lived sometime after him.

== Works ==
The works of Peter of Damascus form a wide array of practical spiritual advice written for monastics. He emphasizes the importance of both ascetic labor and of the grace of God in salvation.

According to the Greek Index Project, there are 107 known manuscripts with writings attributed to Peter of Damascus. These writings are replete with quotations from the Church Fathers, including Athanasius of Alexandria, Anthony the Great, Basil of Caesarea, Dionysius the Areopagite, Isaac the Syrian, John of Damascus, John Chrysostom, and Abba Philimon. Since Peter writes that he never owned any books or possessions, it is likely that he wrote all of these quotes from memory. This would explain his occasional slight misquotations.

There are two general schools of thought with regard to the originality of Peter of Damascus' spiritual teachings. On the one hand, historian Jean Gouillard maintains that there is little originality in Peter's work, but rather that he teaches only what was handed down to him from the Fathers. In Gouillard's own words, "In summary, entirely concentrated on putting into clear formulas the teachings of the greatest contemplatives of the east, the Damascene does not invent, nor does he prepare anything." This dismissal could explain the lack of academic research on Peter of Damascus. On the other hand, Rev. Dr. Greg Peters argues that Peter did in fact contribute to spiritual theology with original work, "Although Gouillard correctly places Peter in the mainstream of the Byzantine monastic tradition, he fails to do complete justice to Peter's innovative use of that tradition."

A notable theme in Peter's writing is his affirmation that salvation is not only for monastics, but for laypeople as well. For example, he writes in one place that "marriage is natural" and that "if someone wants to be saved, no person or no time, place or occupation can prevent him". These words reveal his position that the spiritual life is available to both monastics and non-monastics, even if the life of monasticism was seen as superior. As Bishop Kallistos Ware wrote, "Although writing for monks, he [Peter] insists that salvation and spiritual knowledge are within the reach of everyone; continual prayer is possible in all situations without exception."

== In the Philokalia ==
In 1782, Nicodemus the Hagiorite and Macarius of Corinth published an anthology of teachings from Christian spiritual masters of the 4th through 15th centuries, which was called the Philokalia. The Philokalia was compiled from manuscripts that were available to Nicodemus at Vatopedi and other monasteries on Mount Athos. The book was initially published in Venice with the title "Philokalia of the Sacred Neptic Ones" (Greek: Φιλοκαλία τῶν ἱερῶν νηπτικῶν).

The writings of Peter of Damascus, which exist in this anthology, were first translated from Greek to Slavonic by Paisius Velichkovsky and have since been translated into many more languages. Describing his joy at finding the works of Peter on Athos in the 18th century, Paisius said, "When the brother returned to the cell, I began to ask him with great joy and unutterable astonishment, how it was that such a book, beyond all my hopes, was to be found in this holy place." Notably, Theophan the Recluse's Russian translation of the Philokalia, called the Dobrotoliubie, omits the writings of Peter, probably because they had been translated into Russian earlier by hieromonk Juvenal Polovtsev at Optina Hermitage (who subsequently became the archbishop of Vilnius, Lithuania).

=== Manuscripts ===
Of the 107 known manuscripts that contain writings attributed to Peter of Damascus, most have been edited and subsumed into the two books of Peter which exist in the Philokalia, making him the largest author by size after Maximus the Confessor and taking up a large portion of volume three. According to Jean Gouillard, the division of manuscripts between the two books of Peter in the Philokalia is as follows:

=== Book 1 manuscripts ===
- Vatican City, Bibliotheca Apostolica Vaticana, Pal. gr. 210 (13th century)
- Paris, Bibliothèque Nationale, Ancien gr. 1134 (14th century)
- Oxford, Bodleian, Barocc. 133 (14th century)
- Athos, M. Iberon, Ms gr. 700 (14th century)
- Moscow, Gostudarstvennyi Istoricheskii Muzei, Sinod. gr. 420 and 421 (15th century)

=== Book 2 manuscripts ===
- Athos, M. Lauras, Ms gr. K 125 (15th century)
- Athos, M. Lauras, Ms gr. Λ 24 (16th century)
- Athos, Sk. Annes 8 (17th century)
- Athos, M. Staur., Ms gr. 92 (17th century)

=== Structure ===
As mentioned before, Peter's writings in the Philokalia are divided into two major books that offer a wide array of practical spiritual advice. In the words of Nicodemus of Hagiorite, Peter's writings are "a recapitulation of holy watchfulness... a circle within a circle, a concentrated Philokalia within the more extended Philokalia."

1. Book 1: A Treasury of Divine Knowledge
  1. Introduction
  2. The Seven Forms of Bodily Discipline
  3. The Seven Commandments
  4. The Four Virtues of the Soul
  5. Active Spiritual Knowledge
  6. The Bodily Virtues as Tools for the Acquisition of the Virtues of the Soul
  7. The Guarding of the Intellect
  8. Obedience and Stillness
  9. The Eight Stages of Contemplation
    1. The First Stage of Contemplation
    2. The Second Stage of Contemplation
    3. The Third Stage of Contemplation
    4. The Fourth Stage of Contemplation
    5. The Fifth Stage of Contemplation
    6. The Sixth Stage of Contemplation
    7. The Seventh Stage of Contemplation
    8. The Eighth Stage of Contemplation
  10. That there are No Contradictions in Holy Scripture
  11. The Classification of Prayer according to the Eight Stages of Contemplation
  12. Humility
  13. Dispassion
  14. A Further Analysis of the Seven Forms of Bodily Discipline
  15. Discrimination
  16. Spiritual Reading
  17. True Discrimination
  18. That we should not Despair even if we Sin Many Times
  19. Short Discourse on the Acquisition of the Virtues and on Abstinence from the Passions
  20. How to Acquire True Faith
  21. That Stillness is of Great Benefit to those Subject to Passion
  22. The Great Benefit ofTrue Repentance
  23. God's Universal and Particular Gifts
  24. How God has done All Things for our Benefit
  25. How God's Speech is not Loose Chatter
  26. How it is Impossible to be Saved without Humility
  27. On Building up the Soul through the Virtues
  28. The Great Value of Love and of Advice given with Humility
  29. That the Frequent Repetition found in Divine Scripture is not Verbosity
  30. Spurious Knowledge
  31. A List of the Virtues
  32. A List of the Passions
  33. The Difference between Thoughts and Provocations
2. Book 2: Twenty-Four Discourses (which correspond to the twenty-four letters of the Greek alphabet)
  1. Spiritual Wisdom
  2. The Two Kinds of Faith
  3. The Two Kinds of Fear
  4. True Piety and Self-Control
  5. Patient Endurance
  6. Hope
  7. Detachment
  8. Mortification of the Passions
  9. The Remembrance of Christ's Sufferings
  10. Humility
  11. Discrimination
  12. Contemplation of the Sensible World
  13. Knowledge of the Angelic Orders
  14. Dispassion
  15. Love
  16. Knowledge of God
  17. Moral Judgment
  18. Self-Restraint
  19. Courage
  20. Justice
  21. Peace
  22. Joy
  23. Holy Scripture
  24. Conscious Awareness in the Heart

=== Editing ===
The compilers of the Philokalia slightly edited the writings of Peter, which although not altering the content of the text significantly, occasionally shorten it. As an example, the manuscript supplies the lines:

Λέω όχι στη λαιμαργία και την πορνεία, για χάρη του αυτοκυριαρχίας. Και η ψυχή απωθείται από τα ίδια της τα μάτια, η επιθυμία για μυρωδιές. και περιττά λεφτά
...gluttony and unchastity—through self-control; and the sweet-smelling soul itself is being thrown off by the desire of food; and superfluous possessions...

While the Philokalia renders this, shortened, as:

Λέω όχι στη λαιμαργία και στην πορνεία και στα περιττά χρήματα, αρκούμενος σε εδώ, σύμφωνα με τον Απόστολο.
...gluttony, unchastity and superfluous possessions—and so that we may be content with what we have, as the apostle puts it.

Additionally, in places where a quote is misattributed by Peter, the text of the Philokalia often does not print the misattribution.

=== Lists of virtues and passions ===
Peter of Damascus provides two exhaustive lists of virtues (228 in total) and passions (298 in total). These lists exist in book one of the Philokalia.

== Select quotations ==
All quotations are translations of the original Greek, taken from The Philokalia: The Complete Text compiled by St. Nikodimos of the Holy Mountain and St. Makarios of Corinth, translated from Greek by Palmer, Sherrard, and Ware.

- Knowledge comes like light from the sun. The foolish man through lack of faith or laziness deliberately closes his eyes—that is, his faculty of choice—and at once consigns the knowledge to oblivion because in his indolence he fails to put it into practice.
- What health and sickness are to the body, virtue and wickedness are to the soul, and knowledge and ignorance to the intellect.
- If we bring all this to mind, we will be amazed at God's compassion, and with trembling will marvel at His forbearance and patience. We will grieve because of what our nature has lost angel-like dispassion, paradise and all the blessings which we have forfeited—and because of the evils into which we have fallen: demons, passions and sins.
- The pure in heart are those who have accomplished every virtue reflectively and reverently and have come to see the true nature of things. In this way they find peace in their thoughts.
- If you turn from all other activity and give yourself entirely to the cultivation of the virtues of soul and body...then the tears of joy and understanding will well up copiously within you and you will drink from their plenitude.
- Each virtue lies between two unnatural passions. Moral judgment lies between craftiness and thoughtlessness; self-restraint, between obduracy and licentiousness; courage, between overbearingness and cowardice; justice between over-frugality and greed.
- By means of the virtues of soul and body, and after many struggles, a person is enabled to rise noetically, by Christ's grace, and to engage in spiritual labour—the labour of the intellect—so that he begins to grieve inwardly for his own soul.

== See also ==
- Eastern Christian monasticism
- Philokalia
- Nepsis
