= Philotheus of Sinai =

Egyptian Christian writer

- Born: c. 9th or 10th century
- Residence: Saint Catherine's Monastery, Mount Sinai
- Died: c. 9th or 10th century
- Influences: John Climacus
- Tradition or genre: Sinaitic ascetic tradition
- Major works: 40 Texts on Watchfulness

Philotheus of Sinai was a Christian monk and writer who lived in Egypt. He lived sometime before 1100 – most likely during the 9th century, or possibly the 10th century.

== Life ==
Philotheus was the hegumen of Saint Catherine's Monastery (also known as the Monastery of the Burning Bush) in the Sinai Peninsula.

Philotheus of Sinai followed the Sinaitic ascetic tradition of John Climacus. His writings are similar to those of Hesychius of Sinai. John Climacus, Hesychius of Sinai and Philotheus of Sinai are often considered to form a single Sinaitic literary and spiritual tradition.

== Works ==
His 40 Chapters on Watchfulness (Greek: νηπτικὰ κεφάλαια, romanized: nēptiká kephálaia) are included in the Philokalia.

== See also ==
- Nepsis (watchfulness)
