= The Evergetinos =

11th-century Byzantine monastic anthology

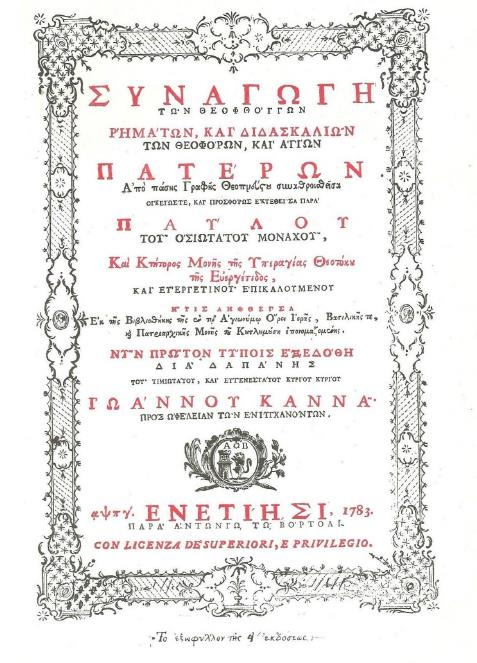
The Evergetinos cover in Greek language

The Evergetinos (Ancient Greek: εὐεργετινός "Of the Benefactress", from Εὐεργέτις evergetis "Benefactress") is a vast collection of materials from a number of other collections of sayings of monastics and others, ranging from the well-known works of St. John Cassian and Palladius, to the anonymously produced Apophthegmata collections, but including materials also from hagiographies, menologia, and other, unspecified and now-lost sources. The collection was compiled in the eleventh century by Hieromonk Paul Evergetinos (i.e., Paul of the monastery of the Benefactress).

In the eighteenth century, Macarios of Corinth and Nicodemos the Hagiorite were responsible for putting together a manuscript for publication based upon a number of manuscripts scattered among the libraries of the Holy Mountain. The first printed edition was produced in 1783 and the work has seen many subsequent editions.
