= Philokalia =

Eastern Orthodox book of spiritual writings

The Philokalia (Ancient Greek: φιλοκαλία, lit. 'love of the beautiful', from φιλία philia "love" and κάλλος kallos "beauty") is "a collection of texts written between the 4th and 15th centuries by spiritual masters" of the mystical hesychast tradition of the Eastern Orthodox Church. They were originally written for the guidance and instruction of monks in "the practice of the contemplative life". The collection was compiled in the 18th century by Nicodemus the Hagiorite and Macarius of Corinth based on the codices 472 (12th century), 605 (13th century), 476 (14th century), 628 (14th century) and 629 (15th century) from the library of the monastery of Vatopedi, Mount Athos.

Although these works were individually known in the monastic culture of Greek Orthodox Christianity before their inclusion in the Philokalia, their presence in this collection resulted in a much wider readership due to its translation into several languages. The earliest translations included a Church Slavonic language translation of selected texts by Paisius Velichkovsky (Dobrotolublye, Добротолю́бїе) in 1793, a Russian translation by Ignatius Bryanchaninov in 1857, and a five-volume translation into Russian (Dobrotolyubie) by Theophan the Recluse in 1877. There were subsequent Romanian, Italian, French, German, Spanish, Finnish and Arabic translations.

The book is the "principal spiritual text" for all the Eastern Orthodox churches. The publishers of the current English translation state that "the Philokalia has exercised an influence far greater than that of any book other than the Bible in the recent history of the Orthodox Church."

Philokalia (sometimes Philocalia) is also the name given to an anthology of the writings of Origen compiled by Basil of Caesarea and Gregory of Nazianzus. Other works on monastic spirituality have also used the same title over the years.

== History ==
Nikodemos and Makarios were monks at Mount Athos, a mountainous peninsula in northern Greece, historically considered the geographical center of Orthodox spirituality and home to 20 monasteries. The first edition, in Greek, was published in Venice in 1782, with a second Greek edition published in Athens in 1893. All the original texts were in Greek—two of them were first written in Latin and translated into Greek in the Byzantine era.

Paisius Velichkovsky's translation into Church Slavonic, Dobrotolublye (published in Moscow in 1793), included selected portions of the Philokalia and was the version that the pilgrim in The Way of a Pilgrim carried on his journey. That book about a Russian pilgrim who is seeking advice on interior prayer helped popularize the Philokalia and its teachings in Russia. Velichkovsky's translation was the first to become widely read by the public, away from the monasteries—helped by the popularity of The Way of a Pilgrim, and the public influence of the startsy at Optina Monastery known as the Optina Elders. Two Russian language translations appeared in the 19th century, one by Ignatius Brianchaninov (1857) and another by Theophan the Recluse's Dobrotolubiye (1877). The latter was published in five volumes and included texts that were not in the original Greek edition.

Velichkovsky was initially hesitant to share his translation outside of the Optina Monastery walls. He was concerned that people living in the world would not have the adequate supervision and guidance of the startsy in the monastery, nor would they have the support of the liturgical life of the monks. He was finally persuaded by the Metropolitan of St. Petersburg to publish the book in 1793. Brianchanivov expressed the same concerns in his work, warning his readers that regular practice of the Jesus Prayer, without adequate guidance, could cause spiritual delusion and pride, even among monks. Their concerns were contrary to the original compiler of the Philokalia, Nicodemos, who wrote that the Jesus Prayer could be used to good effect by anyone, whether monastic or layperson. All agreed that the teachings on constant inner prayer should be practiced under the guidance of a spiritual teacher, or starets.

The first partial English and French translations in the 1950s were an indirect result of the Bolshevik revolution, which brought many Russian intellectuals into Western Europe. T. S. Eliot persuaded his fellow directors of the publishing house Faber and Faber to publish a partial translation into English from the Theophan Russian version, which met with surprising success in 1951. A more complete English translation, from the original Greek, began in 1979 with a collaboration between G. E. H. Palmer, Kallistos Ware, and Philip Sherrard. They released four of the five volumes of the Philokalia between 1979 and 1995; the fifth and final volume was published in 2023, shortly after the death of the last surviving editor, Kallistos Ware. In 1946, the first installment of a ten volume Romanian translation by Father Dumitru Stăniloae appeared. In addition to the original Greek text, Stăniloae added "lengthy original footnotes of his own" as well as substantially expanding the coverage of texts by Saint John of the Ladder, Saint Dorotheos of Gaza, Maximus the Confessor, Symeon the New Theologian, and Gregory Palamas. This work is 4,650 pages in length. Writings by the Trappist monk Thomas Merton on hesychasm also helped spread the popularity of the Philokalia, along with the indirect influence of J. D. Salinger's Franny and Zooey, which featured The Way of a Pilgrim as a main plot element.

== Teachings ==
The collection's title is The Philokalia of the Niptic Fathers, or more fully The Philokalia of the Neptic Saints gathered from our Holy Theophoric Father, through which, by means of the philosophy of ascetic practice and contemplation, the intellect is purified, illumined, and made perfect. Niptic is an adjective derived from the Greek Nipsis (or Nepsis) referring to contemplative prayer and meaning "watchfulness". Watchfulness in this context includes close attention to one's thoughts, intentions, and emotions, with the aim of resisting temptations and vain and egoistic thoughts, and trying to maintain a constant state of remembrance of God. There are similarities between this ancient practice and the concept of mindfulness as practiced in Buddhism and other spiritual traditions. The Philokalia teachings have also influenced the revival of interior prayer in modern times through the centering prayer practices taught by Thomas Keating and Thomas Merton.

Philokalia is defined as the "love of the beautiful, the exalted, the excellent, understood as the transcendent source of life and the revelation of Truth." In contemplative prayer the mind becomes absorbed in the awareness of God as a living presence as the source of being of all creatures and sensible forms. According to the authors of the English translation, Kallistos Ware, G. E. H. Palmer, and Philip Sherrard, the writings of the Philokalia have been chosen above others because they:

...show the way to awaken and develop attention and consciousness, to attain that state of watchfulness which is the hallmark of sanctity. They describe the conditions most effective for learning what their authors call the art of arts and the science of sciences, a learning which is not a matter of information or agility of mind but of a radical change of will and heart leading man towards the highest possibilities open to him, shaping and nourishing the unseen part of his being, and helping him to spiritual fulfilment and union with God."

The Philokalia is the foundational text on hesychasm ("quietness" or "stillness"), an inner spiritual tradition with a long history dating back to the Desert Fathers. The practices include contemplative prayer, quiet sitting, and recitation of the Jesus Prayer. While traditionally taught and practiced in monasteries, hesychasm teachings have spread over the years to include laymen. Nikodemos, in his introduction, described the collected texts as "a mystical school of inward prayer" which could be used to cultivate the inner life and to "attain the measure of the stature of the fullness of Christ." While the monastic life makes this easier, Nikodemos himself stressed that "unceasing prayer" should be practiced by all.

The hesychast teachings in the Philokalia are viewed by Orthodox Christians as inseparable from the sacraments and liturgy of the Orthodox Church, and are given by and for those who are already living within the framework of the Church. A common theme is the need for a spiritual father or guide.

== Timeline of editions and translations ==
- 4th-15th centuries The original texts are written by various spiritual masters. Most are written in Greek, two are written in Latin and translated into Greek during Byzantine times.
- 1782 First edition, Greek, published in Venice, compiled by Nikodemos and Makarios.
- 1793 Church Slavonic translation of selected texts, Dobrotolublye, by Paisius Velichkovsky, published in Moscow. This translation was carried by the pilgrim in The Way of a Pilgrim. First to be read outside of monasteries, with a strong influence on the two following Russian translations.
- 1857 Russian language translation, by Ignatius Brianchaninov.
- 1877 Russian language translation, by Theophan the Recluse, included several texts not in the Greek original, and omitted or paraphrased some passages.
- 1893 Second Greek edition, published in Athens, included additional texts by Patriarch Kallistos.
- 1946-1976 In 1946, the first installment of a twelve volume Romanian translation by Father Dumitru Stăniloae appeared.
- 1951, 1954 First partial English translations by E. Kadloubovsky and G. E. H. Palmer in two volumes: Writings from the Philokalia on Prayer of the Heart and Early Fathers from the Philokalia. These were translated from Theophane's Russian version, and published by Faber and Faber.
- 1953 "Small Philokalia" is published in French: Petite Philocalie de la prière du cœur (ed. Jean Gouillard, Points / Sagesses)
- 1957-1963 Third Greek edition, published in Athens by Astir Publishing Company in five volumes. Modern English translation based on this edition.
- 1963 Parts of the Philokalia is published in Italian for the first time (La filocalia. Testi di ascetica e mistica della Chiesa orientale, Giovanni Vannucci, Libreria Editrice Fiorentina, Firenze)
- 1965 First translation of selected texts from Philokalia is published in Finnish by name Sisäinen kauneus. Rukousta koskevia poimintoja Filokaliasta. (Inner Beauty. Selected texts from the Philokalia on Prayer.) from German translation of Kleine Philokalie. The translation was made by Irinja Nikkanen and it was published by Pyhäin Sergein ja Hermanin veljeskunta (Brotherhood of sts. Sergius and Herman).
- 1979-1995 English translation by Kallistos Ware, G. E. H. Palmer, and Philip Sherrard, of the first four of the five Greek volumes, from the Third Greek edition. This was published by Faber and Faber.
- 1981-1993 A Finnish translation was made from the original Byzantine Greek text by Valamon ystävät ry (Friends of Valamo monastery registered association) in four volumes. Translation was made by nun Kristoduli, Irinja Nikkanen and Matti Jeskanen. An appendix (fifth volume) by nun Kristoduli was published at 1998.
- 1982-1987 An Italian translation by M. Benedetta Artioli and M. Francesca Lovato of the Community of Monteveglio and P. Gribaudi is published in Turin in four volumes.
- 1988 Little Philokalia on prayer of heart (Piccola filocalia della preghiera del cuore) in Italian is translated by Jean Gouillard and published in Milan.
- 1998 A Polish translation of Philokalia by Józef Naumowicz is published in Kraków.
- 2020 An English translation by Anna Skoubourdis of the fifth volume of the Philokalia is published by Virgin Mary of Australia and Oceania.
- 2023 The fifth and final volume of the English translation by Kallistos Ware, G. E. H. Palmer, and Philip Sherrard is published by Faber & Faber.

== Contents ==
This listing of texts is based on the English translation by Bishop Kallistos Ware, G. E. H. Palmer, and Philip Sherrard. Some works in the Philokalia are also found in the Patrologia Graeca and Patrologia Latina of J. P. Migne.

=== Volume 1 ===
- St. Isaiah the Solitary
1. On Guarding the Intellect: 27 Texts
- Evagrius the Solitary
1. Outline Teaching on Asceticism and Stillness in the Solitary
2. Texts on Discrimination in respect of Passions and Thoughts
3. Extracts from the Texts on Watchfulness
4. On Prayer: 153 Texts
- St. John Cassian
1. On the Eight Vices: Written for Bishop Kastor
  1. On Control of the Stomach
  2. On the Demon of Unchastity and the Desire of the Flesh
  3. On Avarice
  4. On Anger
  5. On Dejection
  6. On Listlessness
  7. On Self-Esteem
  8. On Pride
2. On the Holy Fathers of Sketis and on Discrimination: Written for Abba Leontios
- St. Mark the Ascetic
1. On the Spiritual Law: 200 Texts
2. On Those who Think that They are Made Righteous by Works: 226 Texts
3. Letter to Nicolas the Solitary
- St. Hesychios the Priest
1. On Watchfulness and Holiness: Written for Theodoulos
- St. Neilos the Ascetic
1. Ascetic Discourse
- St. Diadochos of Photiki
1. On Spiritual Knowledge and Discrimination: 100 Texts
- St. John of Karpathos
1. For the Encouragement of the Monks in India who had Written to Him: 100 Texts
2. Ascetic Discourse Sent at the Request of the Same Monks in India: A Supplement to the 100 Texts
- St. Antony the Great
1. On the Character of Men and on the Virtuous Life: 170 Texts

This piece by Anthony was changed to an appendix in the English translation by Palmer, Sherrard, and Ware (1979, p. 327), because of their view that the language and the general idea is not explicitly Christian and may not have been written by Antony.

=== Volume 2 ===
- St. Theodoros the Great Ascetic (Theodore of Edessa)
1. A Century of Spiritual Texts
2. Theoretikon
- St. Maximos the Confessor
1. Four Hundred Texts on Love, with a foreword to Elpidios the Presbyter
2. Two Hundred Texts on Theology and the Incarnate Dispensation of the Son of God (written for Thalassios)
3. Various Texts on Theology, the Divine Economy, and Virtue and Vice
4. On the Lord's Prayer
- Thalassios the Libyan
1. On Love, Self Control, and Life in accordance with the Intellect (written for Paul the Presbyter)
- St. John of Damascus
1. On the Virtues and the Vices
- A Discourse on Abba Philemon
- St. Theognostos
1. On the Practice of the Virtues, Contemplation and the Priesthood

=== Volume 3 ===
- St. Philotheos of Sinai

- Forty Texts on Watchfulness

- Ilias the Presbyter
1. A Gnomic Anthology: Part I
2. A Gnomic Anthology: Part II
3. A Gnomic Anthology: Part III
4. A Gnomic Anthology: Part IV
- Theophanis the Monk
1. The Ladder of Divine Graces
- St. Peter of Damascus
1. Book I: A Treasury of Divine Knowledge
  1. Introduction
  2. The Seven Forms of Bodily Discipline
  3. The Seven Commandments
  4. The Four Virtues of the Soul
  5. Active Spiritual Knowledge
  6. The Bodily Virtues as Tools for the Acquisition of the Virtues of the Soul
  7. The Guarding of the Intellect
  8. Obedience and Stillness
  9. The Eight Stages of Contemplation
    1. The First Stage of Contemplation
    2. The Second Stage of Contemplation
    3. The Third Stage of Contemplation
    4. The Fourth Stage of Contemplation
    5. The Fifth Stage of Contemplation
    6. The Sixth Stage of Contemplation
    7. The Seventh Stage of Contemplation
    8. The Eighth Stage of Contemplation
  10. That there are No Contradictions in Holy Scripture
  11. The Classification of Prayer according to the Eight Stages of Contemplation
  12. Humility
  13. Dispassion
  14. A Further Analysis of the Seven Forms of Bodily Discipline
  15. Discrimination
  16. Spiritual Reading
  17. True Discrimination
  18. That we should not Despair even if we Sin Many Times
  19. Short Discourse on the Acquisition of the Virtues and on Abstinence from the Passions
  20. How to Acquire True Faith
  21. That Stillness is of Great Benefit to those Subject to Passion
  22. The Great Benefit ofTrue Repentance
  23. God's Universal and Particular Gifts
  24. How God has done All Things for our Benefit
  25. How God's Speech is not Loose Chatter
  26. How it is Impossible to be Saved without Humility
  27. On Building up the Soul through the Virtues
  28. The Great Value of Love and of Advice given with Humility
  29. That the Frequent Repetition found in Divine Scripture is not Verbosity
  30. Spurious Knowledge
  31. A List of the Virtues
  32. A List of the Passions
  33. The Difference between Thoughts and Provocations
2. Book II: Twenty-Four Discourses
  1. Spiritual Wisdom
  2. The Two Kinds of Faith
  3. The Two Kinds of Fear
  4. True Piety and Self-Control
  5. Patient Endurance
  6. Hope
  7. Detachment
  8. Mortification of the Passions
  9. The Remembrance of Christ's Sufferings
  10. Humility
  11. Discrimination
  12. Contemplation of the Sensible World
  13. Knowledge of the Angelic Orders
  14. Dispassion
  15. Love
  16. Knowledge of God
  17. Moral Judgment
  18. Self-Restraint
  19. Courage
  20. Justice
  21. Peace
  22. Joy
  23. Holy Scripture
  24. Conscious Awareness in the Heart
- St. Symeon the Metaphrast: Paraphrases of the Homilies of St. Macarius of Egypt
1. Spiritual Perfection
2. Prayer
3. Patient Endurance and Discrimination
4. The Raising of the Intellect
5. Love
6. The Freedom of the Intellect

=== Volume 4 ===
- St. Symeon the New Theologian
1. On Faith
2. 153 Practical and Theological Texts
3. The Three Methods of Prayer [attributed to him]
- Nikitas Stithatos
1. On the Practice of the Virtues: One Hundred Texts
2. On the Inner Nature of Things and on the Purification of the Intellect: One Hundred Texts
3. On Spiritual Knowledge, Love and the Perfection of Living: One Hundred Texts
- Theoliptos, Metropolitan of Philadelphia
1. On Inner Work in Christ and the Monastic Profession
2. Texts
- Nikiphoros the Monk
1. On Watchfulness and the Guarding of the Heart
  1. From the Life of Our Holy Father Antony
  2. From the Life of St Theodosios the Cenobiarch
  3. From the Life of St Arsenios
  4. From the Life of St Paul of Mount Latros
  5. From the Life of St Savvas
  6. From the Life of Abba Agathon
  7. From Abba Mark's Letter to Nicolas
  8. From St John Klimakos
  9. From St Isaiah the Solitary
  10. From St Makarios the Great
  11. From St Diadochos
  12. From The Ascetical Homilies by St Isaac the Syrian
  13. From St John of Karpathos
  14. From St Symeon the New Theologian
  15. From Nikiphoros Himself
- St. Gregory of Sinai
1. On Commandments and Doctrines, Warnings and Promises; on Thoughts, Passions and Virtues, and also on Stillness and Prayer: 137 Texts
2. Further Texts
  1. On Passion-Imbued Change
  2. On Beneficent Change
  3. On Morbid Defluxions
3. On the Signs of Grace and Delusion, Written for the Confessor Longinos: Ten Texts
  1. On How to Discover the Energy of the Holy Spirit
  2. On the Different Kinds of Energy
  3. On Divine Energy
  4. On Delusion
4. On Stillness: Fifteen Texts
  1. Two Ways of Prayer
  2. the Beginning of Watchfulness
  3. Different Ways of Psalmodizing
5. On Prayer: Seven Texts
  1. How the Hesychast Should Sit for Prayer and Not Rise Again Too Quickly
  2. How to Say the Prayer
  3. How to Master the Intellect in Prayer
  4. How to Expel Thoughts
  5. How to Psalmodize
  6. How to Partake of Food
  7. On Delusion and Other Subjects
- St. Gregory Palamas
1. To the Most Reverend Nun Xenia
2. A New Testament Decalogue
3. In Defence of Those who Devoutly Practise a Life of Stillness
4. Three Texts on Prayer and Purity of Heart
5. Topics of Natural and Theological Science and on the Moral and Ascetic Life: 150 Texts
6. The Declaration of the Holy Mountain in Defence of Those who Devoutly Practice a Life of Stillness

=== Volume 5 ===
This volume was published in English translation in 2020. These are the contents of the modern Greek translation.

- Kallistos and Ignatios Xanthopoulos
1. Method and precise canon for those who choose the hesychastic and monastic life: 100 chapters
- Kallistos Angelikoudis
1. Kefalaia (Chapters): 81 chapters
- Kallistos Tilikoudis (presumed the same as Kallistos Angelikoudis)
1. On Hesychastic Practice
- Kallistos Katafygiotis (presumed the same as Kallistos Angelikoudis)
1. On union with God, and Life of Theoria
- Saint Simeon, Archbishop of Thessaloniki
1. Chapters on the Sacred and Deifying prayer
- Saint Mark of Ephesus (or Mark the Gentle)
1. On the Words that are Contained in the Sacred Prayer
- Anonymous
1. Interpretation of "Kyrie Eleison" (Lord Have Mercy)
- Saint Simeon the New Theologian
1. Discourse on Faith and teaching for those who say that it is not possible for those who find themselves in the worries of the world to reach the perfection of the virtues, and narration that is beneficial at the beginning.
2. On the Three Ways of Prayer
- St. Gregory of Sinai
- Excerpts from the life of St. Maximos Kapsokalivis
- All Christians Must Pray Uninterruptedly
- Indices

== Translations ==
- Palmer, G. E. H.; Ware, Kallistos; Sherrard, Philip (1979). The Philokalia: The Complete Text. Vol. 1. London: Faber and Faber. ISBN 0-571-11377-X.
- Palmer, G. E. H.; Ware, Kallistos; Sherrard, Philip (1982). The Philokalia: The Complete Text. Vol. 2. London: Faber and Faber. ISBN 0-571-15466-2.
- Palmer, G. E. H.; Ware, Kallistos; Sherrard, Philip (1986). The Philokalia: The Complete Text. Vol. 3. Faber and Faber. ISBN 0-571-17525-2.
- Palmer, G. E. H.; Ware, Kallistos; Sherrard, Philip (1999). The Philokalia: The Complete Text. Vol. 4. Faber and Faber. ISBN 0-571-19382-X.
- Palmer, G. E. H.; Ware, Kallistos; Sherrard, Philip (2023). The Philokalia: The Complete Text. Vol. 5. Faber and Faber. ISBN 9780571374649.
- Skoubourdis, Anna (2020). The Philokalia of the Holy Neptic Fathers, Volume 5: compiled by St. Nikodemos of the Holy Mountain and St. Makarios of Corinth. Virgin Mary of Australia and Oceania. ISBN 979-8-7096-9499-6. OCLC 1291631709.
- Cavarnos, Constantine (2007). The Philokalia: Love of the Beautiful. Institute for Byzantine & Modern Greek Studies. ISBN 978-1-884729-79-9.
- Cavarnos, Constantine (2009). The Philokalia: A Second Volume of Selected Readings (Selected Readings from the Philokalia, Volume 2). Institute for Byzantine and Modern Greek Studies. ISBN 978-1-884729-91-1.
- Palmer, G. E. H.; Ware, Kallistos. "The Philokalia: Complete Text".

== See also ==
- Lovingkindness (Biblical Hebrew: חסד)
- Nous
- Poustinia
