= Nikephoros the Monk =

Nikephoros the Monk (Greek: Νικηφόρος ὁ Μοναχός), also called the Hesychast (ὁ Ἡσυχαστής) or the Athonite (ὁ Ἀθωνίτης), was a 13th-century monk and spiritual writer of the Eastern Orthodox Church. According to Gregory Palamas, Nikephoros was originally a Roman Catholic but travelled to the Byzantine Empire, where he converted to the Eastern Orthodox faith and became a monk at Mount Athos. Like Theoleptos of Philadelphia, Nikephoros was a strong opponent of the union of the Eastern Orthodox and Roman Catholic Churches which was agreed to at the Council of Lyons in 1274. Because of this, he was imprisoned and later wrote an account of his ordeal.

The main theme of Nikephoros’ spiritual writings in the Philokalia is nepsis (Greek: νήψις) which is usually translated as watchfulness or vigilance. For those inexperienced in prayer and spiritual self-control, the mind tends to wander and lapse into imagination. Nikephoros described a method of breathing while praying to concentrate the mind within the heart in order to practice watchfulness.
