= Diadochos of Photiki =

Byzantine bishop and saint

Saint Diadochos of Photiki
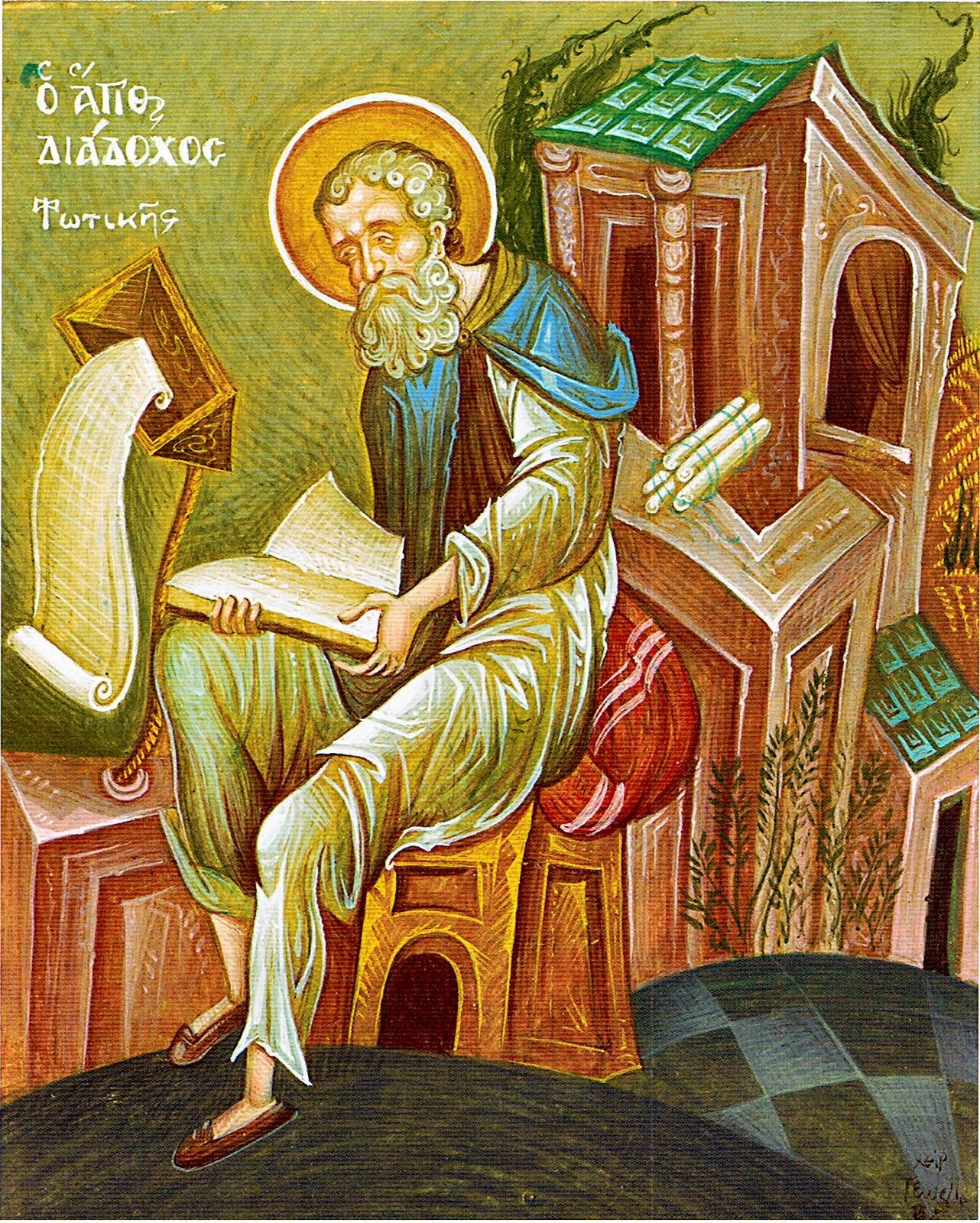

Bishop and Confessor
- Born: c. 400
- Died: c. 486
- Venerated in: Eastern Orthodoxy
- Feast: 29 March

Diadochos of Photiki (Greek: Διάδοχος Φωτικής) was a fifth-century Christian ascetic whose works are included in the Philokalia.

Scholars have acknowledged his great influence on later Byzantine saints such as Maximos the Confessor, John Climacus, Symeon the New Theologian, and in general the Hesychast movement of the 14th century. He has also had great influence in the West via the work, "On the Contemplative Life" (De vita contemplativa) of Julianus Pomerius (†498).

His feast day is commemorated on March 29.

== Life ==
Diadochos was born c. 400 and died sometime before 486. He became bishop of Photiki, a small town in the province of Epirus Vetus, in the northwestern part of present-day Greece. In 451, he took part in the Council of Chalcedon as Bishop of Photiki.

He was most likely part of a group of Epiran notables who were captured during a Vandal raid between 467 and 474. The group was later released in North Africa, somewhere around Carthage, from whence all vanished. His exact date and place of death are thus unknown, although it is assumed he died before 486.

== Writings ==
Diadochos' writing and ascetic practice were greatly influenced by Evagrius the Solitary (also known as Evagrius Ponticus) and Macarius of Egypt (the Great), incorporating their ideas of hesychia (Greek ἡσυχία, "stillness, rest, quiet"), sensible spiritual experience, and the fierceness of the fight against the demons.

=== The Hundred Chapters ===
In all his work, Diadochos appears as a true champion of the doctrine of Chalcedon. In fact, his best-known work, On Spiritual Knowledge and Discrimination (known as the "Hundred Chapters" or "Hundred Texts"), was written for his monks in reaction to strange doctrines coming from the heretical Messalian sect in Mesopotamia (also known as Euchites). Some authors have misunderstood the role of Macarius in Mesopotamia and concluded that Diadochos wrote this main work against him. This, however, is not the case, as Macarius' role was merely to salvage from within the Messalian heresy those who were there by chance or just misled by the ambiguous discourses of the unorthodox doctrine.

In the 100 Chapters, Diadochos shows himself as a bishop worried about the orthodoxy of his flock and as a clear actor in the spiritual fights of his time. Also, Chapters 13 and 91 of his work show readers a real Christian man of prayer, united to God, discovering the "life in Christ" and wanting to share its goodness with his readers.

Sometimes, this work has been referred to as the Gnostic Chapters; however, this can be misleading, as "Gnostic" in this case refers to theoria (the knowledge of God), relating to its Biblical usage, and not to the early Christian sects of Gnosticism, which are considered heretical by Orthodox Christians.

Quote from Chapters 11 & 12:

Spiritual discourse always keeps the soul free from self-esteem, for it gives every part of the soul a sense of light, so that it no longer needs the praise of men. In the same way, such discourse keeps the mind free from fantasy, infusing it completely with the Love of God. Discourse deriving from the wisdom of this world, on the other hand, always provokes self-esteem; because it is incapable of granting us the experience of spiritual perception, it inspires its practitioners with a longing for praise, it being nothing but the fabrication of conceited men. It follows, therefore, that we can know with certainty when we are in the proper state to speak about God if during the hours when we do not speak we maintain a fervent remembrance of God in untroubled silence.

Whoever loves himself cannot love God; but if, because of 'the overflowing richness' of God's love, a man does not love himself, then he truly loves God (Ephes. 2,7). Such a man never seeks his own glory, but seeks the glory of God. The man who loves himself seeks his own glory, whereas he who loves God loves the glory of his Creator. It is characteristic of the soul which consciously senses the Love of God always to seek God's glory in every Commandment it performs and to be happy in its low estate. For glory befits God because of His majesty, while lowliness befits man because it unites us with God. If we realize this, rejoicing in the glory of the Lord, we too, like Saint John the Baptist, will begin to say unceasingly, 'He must increase, but we must decrease.'

An English translation of this work can be found in Vol. I of The Philokalia: The Complete Text.

== Sources ==
- Jacques Paul Migne, Patrologia Graecae
- E. des Places, Diadoque de Photicé (Sources Chrétiennes 5: 2nd edition, reprinted with additions, Paris, 1966)
- Following the Footsteps of the Invisible: The Complete Works of Diadochus of Photike. Tr. by Cliff Ermatinger. Collegeville (MN), 2010 (Cistercian Studies - Cistercian Publications).
