= John of Karpathos =

Eastern Orthodox monk

Saint John of Karpathos

Bishop of Karpathos
- Born: Karpathos, Greece (likely)
- Venerated in: Eastern Orthodox Church
- Feast: 25 August

John of Karpathos was an Eastern Orthodox bishop and monk whose works can be found in the Philokalia.

== Life ==
Little is known about the life of John of Karpathos. Nicodemus of The Holy Mountain said "‘It is not known when John was active or where he underwent his ascetic struggles." It is thought that John of Karpathos became the Bishop of Karpathos. He is known to have given written advice to monks in India during his lifetime, emphasizing the need for restraint and Christian virtue.

Some of the writings of John of Karpathos can be found the Philokalia, a collection of writings from between the 4th and 15th centuries.

== Sainthood ==
In the mid-1980s, Metropolitan Ambrose of Karpathos and Kasos sought for Saint John of Karpathos to be included in the Official List of Orthodox Saints, with the blessing of the Ecumenical Patriarch of Constantinople.

In 1985, 25 August was designated as the feast day of Saint John of Karpathos.
