= Ilias the Presbyter =

Byzantine Christian writer

- Born: c. 11th century Byzantine Empire
- Residence: Constantinople
- Died: c. 12th century
- Influences: Symeon the New Theologian
- Tradition or genre: Eastern Orthodox Christianity
- Major works: A Gnomic Anthology

Ilias the Presbyter and Ekdikos or Presbyter Elias (c. 11th century – c. 12th century) was a Byzantine Christian writer. Some texts attributed to him are included in the Philokalia.

== Identity ==
Ilias the Presbyter lived sometime in the 11th or 12th century. It is unknown when exactly he was born or when he died, although some of his texts date from the 12th century. Ilias the Presbyter was an ekdikos, or a judge at the ecclesiastical court of the Hagia Sophia in Constantinople, and later became a clergyman. He can possibly be identified with Ilias, Metropolitan of Crete in the early 12th century, who authored commentaries on St Gregory of Nazianzus and St John Climacus.

== Writings ==
Ilias the Presbyter may have known about the writings of St Symeon the New Theologian, as both writers mention themes such as tears and the divine light.

His writings include A Gnomic Anthology, which was later compiled as part of the Philokalia.

== See also ==
- Byzantine law
- Byzantine bureaucracy and aristocracy
