= Hesychius of Jerusalem =

Christian priest and exegete

Hesychius of Jerusalem, also spelt Hesychios and also known as Hesychius the Priest, was a Christian priest and exegete, active during the first half of the fifth century. Nothing certain is known as to the dates of his birth and death (450s?), or, indeed concerning the events of his life. Bearing as he does the title πρεσβύτερος "priest", he is not to be confused with Bishop Hesychius of Jerusalem, a contemporary of Gregory the Great.

== Attribution ==
The writings of Hesychius of Jerusalem have been in part lost, in part handed down and edited as the work of other authors, and some are still buried in libraries in manuscript. Whoever would collect and arrange the fragments of Hesychius which have come down to us must go back to the manuscripts; for in Migne's edition of the Church Fathers the works of various writers named Hesychius are thrown together without regard for order under the heading "Hesychius, Presbyter of Jerusalem". About half of the matter under "Hesychius" must be discarded. However, the commentary on Leviticus) which is extant in its entirety only in Latin is authentic, although its biblical text has been aligned to the Vulgate text rather than the Septuagint. Its authenticity has been proved by the publication of a Greek fragment, which, moreover, shows that the Latin text is in poor condition. The collection of ascetic maxims is the work of Hesychius of Sinai, and not of his namesake of Jerusalem. A comprehensive critical edition of the homilies, both authentic and spurious, transmitted in Greek under Hesychius' name was published by Michel Aubineau.

== Method and importance of his exegetical writings ==
The inter-relationship between various significant ancient manuscripts of the Old Testament. LXX denotes the original Septuagint.

Judging from the extant fragments—scattered and translated into Armenian, Georgian, and Latin—Hesychius must have been a very prolific writer on Biblical, particularly Old Testament, exegetics. The notice in the Greek Menology under 28 March, in which mention is made of the exposition of the entire Scriptures, can refer to none other than Hesychius of Jerusalem. In hermeneutics he adheres closely to the allegorico-mystical method of the Alexandrines; he finds in every sentence of the Bible a mystery of dogma, and reads into texts of the Old Testament the whole complexus of ideas in the New. He follows Origen of Alexandria in choosing for the enunciative form of exegesis the shortest possible marginal gloss (paratheseis).

His comment on Isaiah, xix, 1, "the Lord will ascend upon a swift cloud, and will enter into Egypt" is "Christ in the arms of the Virgin". Water represents always to him "the mystical water" (of baptism), and bread, "the mystical table" (of the Eucharist). It is this hyper-allegorical and glossarial method which constitutes the peculiar characteristic of his exegesis, and proves a valuable help to the literary critic in distinguishing authentic Hesychiana from the unauthentic.

The anti-Semitic tone of many scholia may find an explanation in local conditions; likewise geographical and topographical allusions to the holy places of Palestine would be expected of an exegete living at Jerusalem. The importance of Hesychius for textual criticism lies in the fact that many of his paraphrases echo the wording of his exemplar, and still more in his frequent citation of variants from other columns of the Hexapla or Tetrapla, particularly readings of Symmachus, whereby he has saved many rare variants.

He is likewise of importance in Biblical stichometry. His "Capitula" and commentaries show the early Christian division into chapters of at least the Twelve Minor Prophets and Isaiah, which corresponds to the inner sequence of ideas of the respective books better than the modern division. In the case of certain separate books, Hesychius has inaugurated an original stichic division of the Sacred Text—for the "citizen of the Holy City" (hagiopolites) cited in the oldest manuscripts of catenae of the Psalms, and the Canticles, is none other than Hesychius of Jerusalem. It was discovered by Giovanni Mercati that in some manuscripts the initial letter of each division according to Hesychius is indicated in colour. Hesychius must have been generally known as an authority, for he is quoted simply as Hagiopolites, or, elsewhere, by the equally laconic expression "him of Jerusalem" (tou Hierosolymon).

== Separate commentaries ==
It is certain that Hesychius was the author of consecutive commentaries on Leviticus, the Psalms, and Luke (Chapter i?), and of scholia on the Twelve Minor Prophets, Isaiah, and Ezekiel, His name occurs in catenae in connection with an occasional scholium to texts from other books (Genesis, 1 and 2 Samuel, Daniel, Matthew, John, Acts, the Catholic Epistles), which, however, apart from the question of their authenticity, are not necessarily taken from complete commentaries on the respective books. Likewise the citations from Hesychius in ascetic florilegia are taken from exegetical works. The most perplexing problem is the connection of Hesychius with the three commentaries on the Psalms attributed to him. The numerous citations from Hesychius in catenae of the Psalms and the exegetical works on the Psalms handed down over his name, particularly in Oxford and Venice manuscripts, are so widely at variance with each other as to preclude any question of mere variations in different transcriptions of one original; either Hesychius was the author of several commentaries on the Psalms or the above-mentioned commentaries are to be attributed to several authors perhaps named Hesychius. As a matter of fact Spanish manuscripts clearly distinguish between Hesychius the Monk, author of commentaries on the Psalms and Canticles, and Hesychius the Priest. In 1900 the commentary on the Psalms included among the works of Saint Athanasius was explained as the glossary of Hesychius issued over a pseudonym. This hypothesis has since been confirmed by further evidence.

A complete commentary of Hesychius on the Canticles of the Old and New Testament, which are known to have constituted a distinct book in the early Christian Bible, is preserved in manuscript; any edition of this must be based on the Bodl. Miscell., 5, saec. 9. Another codex which would have been particularly valuable for this edition and for the solution of the Hesychius problem, the Turin manuscript B. VII. 30, saec. 8-9, has unfortunately been destroyed by fire. The Mechitarists of San Lazzaro have in their possession an Armenian commentary on Job over the name of Hesychius of Jerusalem, which was published with a French translation by Charles Mercier and Charles Renoux in 1983. The scholia of Hesychius to the Twelve Minor Prophets, which are preserved in six manuscripts at Rome, Paris, and Moscow, have been published by Mats Eriksson. His commentary on Isaiah was discovered in 1900 in the anonymous marginal notes to an eleventh-century Vatican manuscript (Vatic., 347) and published with a facsimile; the authenticity of these 2860 scholia was later confirmed by a ninth-century Bodleian manuscript (Miscell., 5).

Scholia to the Magnificat, in the catenae of Canticles, and manuscripts at Paris and Mount Athos establish beyond doubt the fact that Hesychius left a commentary on the Gospel of St. Luke, at least on the first chapter. For evidence as to the authenticity of the "Harmony of the Gospels" the treatise on the Resurrection must first be examined. This is extant in two forms, a longer (under Gregory of Nyssa and a shorter, the latter an abridgement of the former and as yet unpublished. In tenth-, eleventh-, and twelfth-century manuscripts of the former, to "Hesychius Presbyter of Jerusalem" is added the further title "the theologian".
