= Philip Sherrard =

British author and translator (1922–1995)

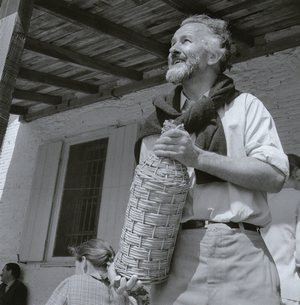
- Born: Philip Owen Arnould Sherrard; 23 September 1922; Oxford, England
- Died: 30 May 1995 (aged 72); London, England
- Education: Dauntsey's School
- Alma mater: Peterhouse, Cambridge; King's College London
- Occupations: Author, translator, theologian
- Spouses: Anna Mirodia; Denise Harvey
- Children: 2
- Writing career
- Subjects: Modern Greek studies, Orthodox Christianity, the environment
- Notable works: The Greek East and the Latin West; The Rape of Man and Nature; The Marble Threshing Floor

Philip Owen Arnould Sherrard (23 September 1922 – 30 May 1995) was a British author and translator. His work includes translations of Modern Greek poets, and books on Modern Greek literature and culture, metaphysics, theology, art and aesthetics. In England he was influential in making major Greek poets of the nineteenth and twentieth centuries known. Sherrard was a practising Eastern Orthodox Christian and was responsible, along with Kallistos Ware and G. E. H. Palmer, for the first full translation of the Philokalia into English.

Sherrard also wrote prolifically on theological and philosophical themes, describing what he believed to be a social and spiritual crisis occurring in the developed world, specifically modern attitudes towards the biophysical environment from a Christian and perennialist perspective.

== Biography ==
Philip Owen Arnould Sherrard was born on 23 September 1922 in Oxford. His family had many connections with the literary world of the period: his mother, Brynhild Olivier, had been a member of Rupert Brooke's circle before the First World War and his half-sister was married to Quentin Bell, the nephew of Virginia Woolf. He was educated at Dauntsey's School and at Peterhouse, Cambridge, where he obtained a degree in history.

Sherrard first came to Greece as a soldier after the liberation of Athens in 1946. The culture and traditional way of life of the country made a profound impression on him. At this time he first corresponded with the poet George Seferis, whose work he was subsequently to translate into English. He also met and married his first wife, Anna Mirodia. After living for a period in London, he returned to Greece to serve as assistant director of the British School of Archaeology at Athens in 1951-52 and again in 1957–62. His doctoral thesis on the Greek poets Solomos, Palamas, Cavafy, Angelos Sikelianos and Seferis (King's College, London) was published in 1956 as The Marble Threshing Floor. In the same year he was baptised in the Orthodox Church.

In 1959 Sherrard bought part of disused magnesite mine near the small shipping town of Limni on the island of Evia. He planted trees and plants where the former mine installations had been, and helped to restore the homes of the former directors who had lived there before the mine was abandoned at the outbreak of the Second World War. In 1970 he accepted a lectureship on the history of the Orthodox Church, a post attached jointly to King's College, London and the School of Slavonic and East European Studies (SSEES). After his resignation in 1977, he moved back to Greece, where Limni now became his permanent home.

In 1979 he married his second wife, the publisher Denise Harvey. In 1980, together with Keith Critchlow, Brian Keeble and the poet Kathleen Raine, he was one of the founding members of the journal Temenos, a review devoted to the "arts of the imagination". This eventually led to the foundation of the Temenos Academy, a teaching organisation based in London.

Sherrard died in London on 30 May 1995 at the age of 72 and was buried near the Orthodox chapel he had had built on his property. He had two daughters.

== Writings ==
Sherrard's first book was The Marble Threshing Floor (1956), an "introduction to modern Greek poetry for English-speaking readers, which, together with his translations, brought the poetry of Cavafy and Seferis, together with its cultural background, to the attention of the literary world." As a translator of Modern Greek poetry, he had a long and productive collaboration with Edmund Keeley. They produced many books together, among them Four Greek Poets (1966), the Collected Poems of George Seferis (1967) and of C.P. Cavafy (1975) and Selected Poems by Angelos Sikelianos (1979) and Odysseus Elytis (1981). The importance of these translations is indicated by the fact that both Seferis and Elytis went on to receive the Nobel Prize for Literature after their work had become known beyond the Greek-speaking world.

In his writing, Sherrard often attempted to avert what he saw as an oncoming environmental catastrophe. He saw the world's ecological crisis as evidence of a larger spiritual crisis and sought always to "emphasize the living relevance of the Orthodox spiritual tradition in a fragmented secular world." He produced a number of works developing this theme, including The Sacred in Life and Art, Human Image: World Image: The Death and Resurrection of Sacred Cosmology and The Rape of Man and Nature.

Among his works (together with his collaborators Kallistos Ware and G. E. H. Palmer) is the complete translation of the Philokalia, a compendium of mystical writings by the spiritual fathers of the Orthodox Church. Christianity: Lineaments of a Sacred Tradition was posthumously published in 1998. This book is a collection of articles dealing with subjects such as tradition, death and dying, the problem of evil and the revival of contemplative hesychast spirituality.

== Bibliography ==
- The Marble Threshing Floor: Studies in Modern Greek Poetry (London: Valentine, Mitchell, 1956; reprinted Limni (Greece): Denise Harvey, 1981, 1992) ISBN 960-7120-02-7
- The Greek East and the Latin West: A Study in the Christian Tradition (Oxford: Oxford University Press, 1959; reprinted Limni (Greece): Denise Harvey, 1992, 1995, 2002) ISBN 960-7120-04-3
- Six Poets of Modern Greece (with Edmund Keeley) (London: Thames and Hudson, 1960)
- Constantinople: The Iconography of a Sacred City (London: Oxford University Press, 1965)
- Great Ages of Man: Byzantium: A History of the World's Cultures (Time Life Books, 1966) ISBN 978-0-662-83340-6
- Modern Greece (with John Campbell) (London: Ernest Benn, 1968) ISBN 0-510-37951-6
- Δοκίμια γιά τόν Νέο Ἑλληνισμό (Athens: Athina Publications, 1972)
- Christianity and Eros: Essays on the Theme of Sexual Love (London: SPCK, 1976; reprinted Limni (Greece): Denise Harvey, 1995, 2002) ISBN 960-7120-10-8
- Church, Papacy, and Schism: A Theological Enquiry (London: SPCK, 1978; reprinted Limni (Greece): Denise Harvey, 1996) ISBN 960-7120-11-6, ISBN 978-960-7120-24-3
- The Wound of Greece: Studies in Neo-Hellenism (London: Rex Collings, 1978) ISBN 978-0-86036-070-4
- Athos: The Holy Mountain (Overlook Hardcover, 1985) ISBN 978-0-87951-988-9
- The Rape of Man and Nature: An Enquiry into the Origins and Consequences of Modern Science (Ipswich: Golgonooza Press, 1987) ISBN 0-903880-34-2
- The Sacred in Life and Art (Ipswich: Golgonooza Press, 1990; reprinted Limni (Greece): Denise Harvey, 2004) ISBN 960-7120-18-3
- Human Image: World Image: The Death and Resurrection of Sacred Cosmology (Ipswich: Golgonooza Press, 1992; reprinted Limni (Greece): Denise Harvey, 2004) ISBN 960-7120-17-5
- This Dialectic of Blood and Light, George Seferis – Philip Sherrard, An Exchange: 1946-1971 (Limni (Greece): Denise Harvey, 2015) ISBN 978-960-7120-37-3
- The Rape of Man and Nature: An Enquiry into the Origins and Consequences of Modern Science (Ipswich: Golgonooza Press,1987; reprinted Limni (Greece): Denise Harvey, 1991, 2015) ISBN 978-960-7120-36-6

Poetry

- Orientation and Descent (Eton: Alden and Blackwell, 1953)
- Motets for a Sunflower (Ipswich: Golgonooza Press, 1979)
- In the Sign of the Rainbow: Selected Poems 1940–1989 (London: Anvil Press Poetry, 1994) ISBN 0-85646-221-7

As Editor or Translator

- The Pursuit of Greece (London: John Murray, 1964; reprinted Athens: Denise Harvey, 1987) ISBN 0-907978-24-X
- Nikos Kazantzakis and his Odyssey. A Study of the Poet and the Poem (New York: Simon and Schuster, 1961)
- George Seferis: Collected Poems (1924–1955) (with Edmund Keeley) (London: Jonathan Cape, 1969)
- C. P. Cavafy: Collected Poems (with Edmund Keeley) (Princeton: Princeton University Press, 1975, 1992) ISBN 0-691-06984-0
- The Philokalia (with G. E. H. Palmer and Kallistos Ware), 5 Vols (London: Faber, 1979–2023)
- A Greek Quintet: Poems by Cavafy, Sikelianos, Seferis, Elytis, Gatsos (Limni (Greece): Denise Harvey, 1992, 2000) ISBN 960-7120-01-9
- Angelos Sikelianos: Selected Poems (with Edmund Keeley) (Princeton: Princeton University Press, 1979; reprinted Limni (Greece): Denise Harvey, 1996) ISBN 960-7120-12-4
- Odysseus Elytis: Selected Poems (with Edmund Keeley) (London: Anvil Press Poetry, 1981, 2007) ISBN 9780856463556
- Edward Lear: The Corfu Years: A Chronicle presented through his Letters and Journals (editor) (Athens and Dedham: Denise Harvey, 1988) ISBN 0-907978-25-8
- George Seferis: Complete Poems (with Edmund Keeley) (London: Anvil Press Poetry, 1995, 2006) ISBN 0-85646-213-6

As Contributor

- Not of This World: A Treasury of Christian Mysticism (World Wisdom, 2003) ISBN 978-0-941532-41-9
- Science and the Myth of Progress (World Wisdom, 2004) ISBN 978-0-941532-47-1
- The Betrayal of Tradition: Essays on the Spiritual Crisis of Modernity (World Wisdom, 2005) ISBN 978-0-941532-55-6

About Sherrard

- Kelley, James L., Philip Sherrard: Orthodox Theosophy and the Reign of Quantity (Norman, OK: Romanity Press, 2016).
- Philip Sherrard: The Unifying Vision (2025) ISBN 9781068678943
