= Rodney Palmer =

English cricketer and soldier

Personal information
- Full name: Rodney Howell Palmer
- Born: 24 November 1907; Sherfield-on-Loddon, Hampshire, England
- Died: 24 April 1987 (aged 79); Newbury, Berkshire, England
- Batting: Right-handed
- Bowling: Right-arm fast

Domestic team information
- Years: Team
- 1928–1929: Berkshire
- 1929: Cambridge University
- 1930–1933: Hampshire

Career statistics
Competition	First-class
Matches	4
Runs scored	0
Batting average	0.00
100s/50s	0/0
Top score	0
Balls bowled	554
Wickets	9
Bowling average	32.44
5 wickets in innings	1
10 wickets in match	0
Best bowling	5/93
Catches/stumpings	1/–
- Source: Cricinfo, 17 May 2008

Rodney Howell Palmer MC (24 November 1907 — 24 April 1987) was an English first-class cricketer and an officer in the British Army. As a cricketer, he played first-class cricket for both Cambridge University and Hampshire. Embarking on a career in the army with the 12th Royal Lancers in 1930, he served with the Lancers until 1946. During that period, he served in the Second World War and was awarded the Military Cross. He would later serve as the High Sheriff of Berkshire in 1953.

== Cricket and military career ==
The son of Eustace Exall Palmer, a director of Huntley & Palmers biscuits, he was born in November 1907 at Sherfield-on-Loddon, Hampshire. He was educated at Harrow, where he played for both the college cricket and football teams. From Harrow, he matriculated to Pembroke College, Cambridge. While studying at Cambridge, he made a single appearance for Cambridge University against Essex at Fenner's in 1929. While also studying at Cambridge, he played minor counties cricket for Berkshire in 1928 and 1929, making eleven appearances in the Minor Counties Championship. Palmer would later make three first-class appearances for Hampshire, making his debut against Kent in the 1930 County Championship, when after capturing Wally Hardinge caught behind he tore an ankle ligament in his sixth over and wasn't able to take any further part in the game. It was 1933 before he re-appeared, making two appearances in the 1933 County Championship against Yorkshire and Kent. A tall and strongly-built right-arm fast bowler who could exhibit late swerve, he took nine wickets at an average of 32.44 across his four matches; Palmer took one five wicket haul, with figures of 5 for 93 against Yorkshire.

After graduating from Cambridge, Palmer was commissioned into the British Army as a second lieutenant in August 1930, prior to his appointment with the 12th Royal Lancers in 1931. He was promoted to lieutenant in January 1933, before being promoted to captain in August 1938. While serving in Egypt during the mid-1930s, Palmer played minor matches for the Egyptian cricket team, which consisted of British officials. Palmer served in the Second World War, initially in France during the Phoney War which followed the German Invasion of Poland. Between 1940 and 1943, he served in the Middle East. He was awarded the Military Cross in June 1943, along with other officers, "in recognition of gallant and distinguished services in the Middle East". Palmer later saw action in the Normandy campaign, during the course of which he was wounded in action. Following the war, he was promoted to major in July 1946, with Palmer immediately retiring from active service following his promotion on account of ill-health; with his retirement, he was granted the honorary rank of lieutenant colonel. He was High Sheriff of Berkshire in 1953, when he was living at Peasemore Manor. Following his military career, he was involved in farming. Palmer died at Newbury in April 1987. His elder brother was the author and politician Gerald Palmer.
