= Lorenzo Scupoli =

Neapolitan priest and theologian

Lorenzo Scupoli CR
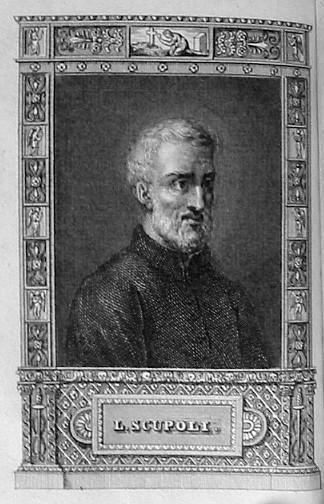
- Image of Lorenzo Scupoli, from an 1810 French translation of The Spiritual Combat
- Born: Francesco Scupoli c. 1530; Otranto, Kingdom of Naples
- Died: 26 November 1610 (aged 79–80); Naples, Kingdom of Naples

Francesco Scupoli CR (c. 1530 – 26 November 1610), better known by his religious name Lorenzo Scupoli, was a Neapolitan Catholic priest, most notable for his authorship of The Spiritual Combat (Italian: Il combattimento spirituale), an important work in 16th-century Catholic spirituality.

== Life ==
Scupoli was born in Otranto, Kingdom of Naples around 1530. In 1569, he joined the Theatines, officially beginning his novitiate on 1 January 1570. Sometime between 1572 and 1573, he was made a deacon and on 25 December 1577 he was ordained as a priest in Piacenza, Duchy of Parma and Piacenza. Scupoli travelled to Milan in 1578 to participate in a diocesan reform and later began ministering, caring for patients of the Plague around 1581. For reasons that are still unclear, in 1581, Scupoli was accused of an "atrocious crime" (Note: Italian: un atroce delitto) and removed from the priesthood sometime prior to 1585 and sentenced to one year in prison in Rome. His sentence was reviewed and upheld three years later in 1588.

Scupoli moved to Venice in 1589, where he published The Spiritual Combat. Between 1589 and 1591, he made several trips to Padua, where he likely encountered his most well-known admirer, Francis de Sales. In 1599, while still in Venice, he published a treatise — The Way of Consolation and Helping the Sick to Die Well (Italian: Modo di consolare e aiutare gli infermi a ben morire) — and later was invited back to Naples. Ultimately, his sentence was relieved in April 1610 and he was able to resume his priestly duties, allowing him to "be able to say Mass, notwithstanding the time he has left for the sentence of his condemnation." (Note: Italian: poter dire la messa, non ostante il tempo che gli resta per la sentenza della sua condennatione)

Scupoli died on 26 November 1610 in Naples.

== The Spiritual Combat ==
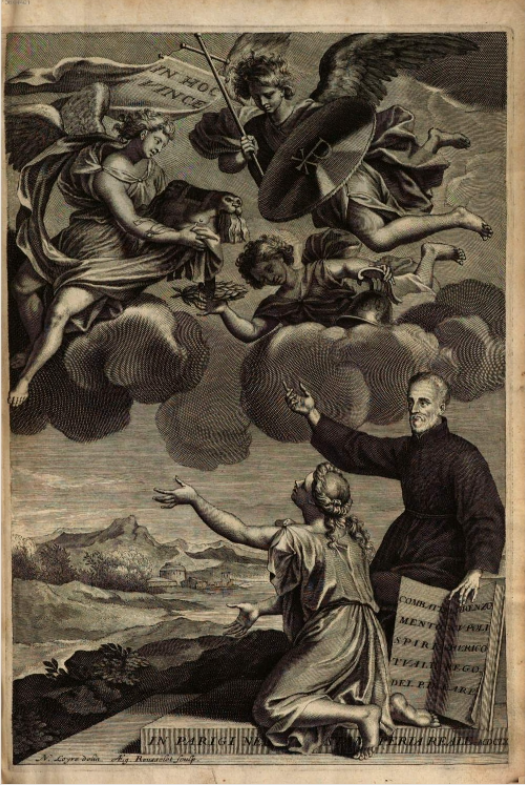
Scupoli (bottom right) depicted in a copy of The Spiritual Combat

While living in Venice, Scupoli published the first edition of The Spiritual Combat in 1589. It was written as a practical manual for spiritual living. At first, it teaches that the sense of life is incessant fighting against egoistic longings and replacing them with sacrifice and charity. The one who does not do this loses, and suffers in Hell; the one who does it, trusting not in his own, but God's power, triumphs and is happy in Heaven. Scupoli analyses various usual situations and advises how to cope with them, preserving a pure conscience and improving virtue. It emphasizes also the boundless goodness of God, which is the cause of all good; what is bad originates from the human who rebels against God.

The book was immediately popular, being republished nearly 60 times during Scupoli's lifetime and was translated into dozens of languages, including German, Latin, French, and English within ten years of its original publication. (Note: The book was translated into Spanish, Flemish, Portuguese, Polish, and Croatian during the 17th century; and Armenian and Arabic in the 18th century. It was later translated into Greek, Russian, Breton, Chinese, Japanese, Hungarian, Romanian, and Latvian. To date, there are over 600 published editions.) Despite the book's popularity, Scupoli originally published it anonymously, attributing the authorship only to a "servant of God", leading to several false attributions. It was not until after his death in 1610 that the book's true authorship was revealed in a 1610 Bolognese edition. The Spiritual Combat was held in extremely high regard both during Scupoli's lifetime and for several centuries after. Francis de Sales reportedly kept it as a pocketbook.

Scupoli's original book is highly condensed, and assumes the reader has a certain moral and theological outlook. So a commentary may help modern readers benefit from the work. In the 18th century, Nicodemus the Hagiorite translated the book to Greek, adapting it for the benefit of Orthodox readers, and merging it with Scupoli's shorter Path to Paradise. This new version was published as Unseen Warfare. In the 19th century, the work was further revised by Russian monk Theophan the Recluse, and was again published as Unseen Warfare.
