= Gerald Palmer (author) =

British politician and writer (1904–1984)

Gerald Palmer MP

Member of Parliament for Winchester
- In office 1935–1945
- Preceded by: Sir Robert Ellis
- Succeeded by: George Jeger

Personal details
- Born: Gerald Eustace Howell Palmer; 9 June 1904
- Died: 7 February 1984 (aged 79)
- Party: Conservative

Gerald Eustace Howell Palmer (9 June 1904 – 7 February 1984) was a British author, book translator, and Conservative Party politician. Palmer's work in translating the Philokalia, an Eastern Orthodox spiritual text, is still recognised in modern times with the popularity of that book.

== Eastern Orthodox writings ==
Palmer helped translate several Eastern Orthodox spiritual texts, the most notable being the Philokalia, a collaboration with Kallistos Ware and Philip Sherrard. They made available for the first time, in English, the bulk of that Eastern Orthodox text on the hesychasm tradition. He also translated for English readers a book on Greek poetry, The Marble Threshing Floor (1956), a study of Dionysios Solomos, Costis Palamas, Constantin Cavafis, Angelos Sikelianos, and Giorgos Seferis. Palmer's attraction to Eastern Orthodox teachings caused him to go on a pilgrimage in 1948 to Mount Athos, Greece, the center of Eastern Orthodox monasticism and inner spirituality. A chance encounter upon his arrival at Mt. Athos resulted in a meeting with a Fr. Nikon, who became Palmer's spiritual father, or starets in the Eastern Orthodox tradition. By 1950, Palmer officially joined the Orthodox Church. Palmer first translated, with Evgeniia Kadloubovsky, two small volumes of the Philokalia from the Russian. The publisher Faber and Faber was reluctant to publish such an obscure book, but one of their directors, T. S. Eliot, convinced them to do so based on his own deep impression of the spiritual teachings in that book. Faber and Faber finally relented, expecting to lose money, but instead found that it was a commercial success. In 1971, Palmer invited Ware and Sherrard to join him in a more complete translation of the Philokalia from the original Greek. Before Palmer's death in 1984, they were able to translate and publish four of the five volumes of the Philokalia.

Palmer made almost yearly pilgrimages to Mt. Athos.

== Political career ==
He was Member of Parliament (MP) for Winchester from 1935 until his defeat at the 1945 general election by the Labour candidate George Jeger. He also played cricket for Berkshire in the Minor Counties Championship from 1925 to 1930.

After losing his seat in parliament in the 1945 election, Palmer travelled to Mount Athos, which led to a deepening interest in Greek Orthodoxy. He spent much of the rest of his life working on translations of key Orthodox texts.

== Committees ==
Palmer served on the Council of Reading University from 1936 who awarded him an honorary Doctorate of Letters (D.Litt.) in 1957 before becoming its president in 1966. He was a Forestry Commissioner between 1963 and 1965.

== Personal life ==
Born to Eustace Exall Palmer of Drayton House at Sherfield on Loddon in Hampshire, a director of Huntley & Palmers biscuits, and his wife, Madeline Mary Howell, at Reading in Berkshire. Gerald Palmer was the grandson of Alfred Palmer (1852–1936) who had graduated with a Doctor of Science (D.Sc.). He too was President of the Council of the University of Reading. Alfred was also director of Huntley & Palmer's biscuits, a county magistrate then High Sheriff in 1905 and lived at Wokefield Park; his father in turn was George Palmer MP.

He was educated at Winchester College, Hampshire then New College, Oxford. He was Private Secretary to the Prime Minister in 1935 and also that year a Parliamentary Private Secretary (PPS) to the Parliamentary Under-Secretary of State to the Home Office in 1935. He fought in World War II and was mentioned in despatches. He gained the rank of captain in the service of the Royal Artillery. He was jointly PPS to the Secretary of State Colonies in 1942 and the Lord Privy Seal. His brother was the cricketer Rodney Palmer.

He died in 1984 at his home, Bussock Mayne at Winterbourne near Newbury in Berkshire.

== Partial list of works ==
- Palmer, G. E. H.; Makarios, Saint Metropolitan of Corinth; Nicodemus, the Hagiorite Saint; E Kadloubovsky (1951). Writings from the Philokalia on prayer of the heart. London: Faber and Faber.
- Palmer, G. E. H.; Makarios, Saint Metropolitan of Corinth; Nicodemus, the Hagiorite Saint; E Kadloubovsky (1954). Early Fathers from the Philokalia : together with some writings of St. Abba Dorotheus, St. Isaac of Syria, and St. Gregory Palamas. London: Faber and Faber.
- Palmer, G. E. H.; Makarios, Saint Metropolitan of Corinth; Nicodemus, the Hagiorite Saint; E Kadloubovsky (1952). Unseen warfare : the 'Spiritual combat' and 'Path to Paradise' of Lorenzo Scupoli. London: Faber and Faber.
- Palmer, G. E. H.; Kallistos Ware; Philip Sherrard (1973–2023). Philokalia: The Complete Text. London: Faber and Faber.

== Notes ==
Parliament of the United Kingdom
Preceded by Sir Robert Ellis	Member of Parliament for Winchester; 1935–1945	Succeeded by George Jeger
