= Apophthegmata =

Apophthegmata, the plural of apophthegm (also spelled apothegm), a pithy maxim, is the abbreviated title of several collections of aphorisms, adages, maxims, or proverbs, specifically:

- Apophthegmata of Delphi
- Apophthegmata Laconica attributed to Plutarchus
- Apophthegmata Patrum (Sayings of the [Christian Desert] Fathers)
- Apophthegmata Macarii Magni
- Apophthegmatum Opus of Desiderius Erasmus Roterodamus
- Apophthegmata, ex Probatis Graecae Latinaeque Linguae Scriptoribus of Conrad Lycosthenes (circa 1518-61)
- Ars Apophthegmatica (1655-6) of Georg Philipp Harsdörffer
- Der Teutschen Scharpfsinnige kluge Sprüch (1626) of Julius Wilhelm Zincgref

It may also denominate a literary genre.
