= Paul Bedjan =

Assyrian priest

- Church: Chaldean Catholic Church

Orders
- Ordination: 25 May 1861

Personal details
- Born: November 27, 1838 Khosrova, Persia
- Died: June 9, 1920 (aged 81) Nippes, Cologne, Germany
- Denomination: Eastern Catholicism
- Occupation: Priest

Paul Bedjan (27 November 1838 – 9 June 1920) was an Assyrian priest of the Chaldean Catholic Church and a Syriacist and orientalist.

== Biography ==
Born in Khosrova, Persia, Bedjan was born into a Chaldean Catholic family, and enrolled as a pupil at the French Lazarist School in Khosrova in 1846. On 27 October 1856, at the age of eighteen, he became a Lazarist novice in Paris. On 25 May 1861, Bedjan was ordained priest there, and, after a few months, returned to Persia/Iran, taking a small reed organ and printing press with him.

Until 1880, he worked as a pastor and organist in his hometown, and in Urmia. He then returned to France to raise funds for the printing of liturgical and theological works in Syriac. From 1885 to 1900, he was active in Ans, Liège, Belgium. He was then appointed pastor to the Daughters of Charity at the Vinzenz-Hospital in the northern Cologne suburb of Nippes, a role that he carried out, alongside his editorial work, until his death. He refused repeated calls that he be made the Chaldean Catholic Church Bishop of Salamas.

Of his works, his seven edited volumes of Syriac lives of saints and martyrs (Acta Martyrum et Sanctorum) and five volumes of verse-homilies of Jacob of Serugh (Homiliae selectae Mar Iacobi Sarugensis) are the most significant. He was able to complete a Neo-Aramaic Bible translation shortly before the end of his life. He died in Cologne, Germany.

== Major works ==
- Breviarium Chaldaicum, 3 volumes of ~3000 pages (1886–1887), photomechanischer Nachdruck: Rom 1938.
- Bedjan, Paul (2007) [1890–1897]. Acts of Martyrs and Saints: Acta Martyrum et Sanctorum. Gorgias. pp. 5, 008 pages in 7 volumes. ISBN 978-1-59333-682-0.
- Histoire de Mar Jab-Alaha, Patriarche (1888, 2nd ed 1995; reprint Gorgias, 2007).
- Nomocanon Gregorii Barhebraei (1898).
- Ethicon, seu Moralia Gregorii Barhebraei (1898) (reprint Mor Gabriel Monastery, 2018).
- S.Martyrii qui et Sahdona quae supersunt omnia. Paris: O. Harrassowitz, 1902.
- Homiliae selectae Mar Iacobi Sarugensis, 5 volumes (1905–1910).
- Nestorius, Le livre d'Héraclide de Damas (1910).
