= Nicodemus the Hagiorite =

Greek Orthodox ascetic

Saint Nicodemus of the Holy Mountain
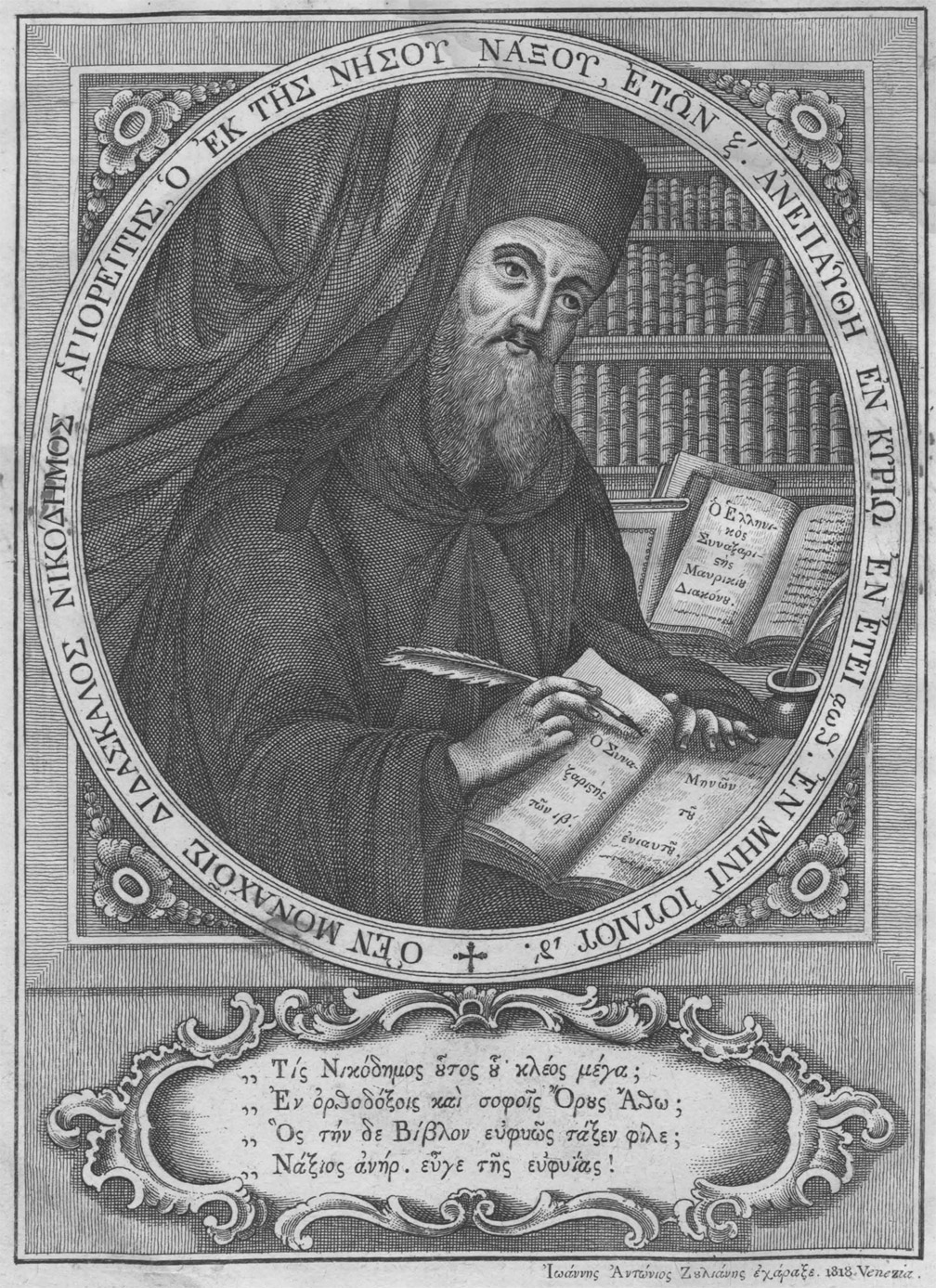
- Icon of Saint Nicodemus from the Great Synaxarion, published in Venice in 1819.

Venerable, Hagiorite
- Born: 1749; Naxos
- Died: July 14, 1809 (age 60); Mount Athos
- Venerated in: Eastern Orthodox Church
- Canonized: May 31, 1955 by the Patriarchate of Constantinople
- Major shrine: Mount Athos; Church of the Naxian Saints, Naxos.
- Feast: July 14; First Sunday of September (with the other Saints of Paros and Naxos)
- Attributes: Long white beard, monastic garb, often writing on a scroll, or in a book.

Nicodemus the Hagiorite or Nicodemus of the Holy Mountain (Greek: Ὅσιος Νικόδημος ὁ Ἁγιορείτης; 1749 – July 14, 1809) was a Greek ascetic monk, mystic, theologian, and philosopher, venerated as a saint in the Eastern Orthodox Church. His life's work was a revival of traditional Christian practices and patristic literature.

He wrote ascetic prayer literature and influenced the rediscovery of hesychasm, a method of contemplative prayer from the Byzantine period.

He is most famous for his work with Macarius of Corinth on the anthology of monastic spiritual writings known as The Philokalia, as well as for his compilation of canons known as the Pedalion (or The Rudder) which he co-wrote with a hieromonk named Agapios Monachos.

With Macarios of Corinth, Nicodemus was responsible for the compilation and publishing of The Evergetinos. He also assembled, collecting, and editing a number of manuscripts scattered among the libraries of Mount Athos, the Holy Mountain. Nicodemus was canonized by the Ecumenical Patriarch of Constantinople in 1955.

== Early life and education ==
Persecution from the Turks, who ruled most of the Greek world at the time, cut his schooling short, and he returned to Naxos in 1770.

== Monastic life ==
Nicholas made the acquaintance of Macarius of Corinth a few years after returning home, beginning a lifelong friendship. It was shortly thereafter that he decided to embrace the monastic life, following the example of three monks he had encountered, Gregory, Niphon, and Arsenios. These men had come from Mount Athos, which had been an important center of monasticism for over seven hundred years, and persuaded Nicholas to go there as well. He arrived there in 1775, at age 26.

Upon being tonsured a monk, Nicholas' name was changed, as is the custom for those who had abandoned the world, to Nicodemus. He was initiated into the practice of hesychia, a method of prayer involving inner stillness, controlled breathing, and repetition of the "Jesus Prayer" (Lord Jesus Christ, Son of God, have mercy on me, a sinner). Nicodemus aligned himself with the monks known as Kollyvades, who sought a revival of traditional Orthodox practices and patristic literature, and he spent the remainder of his life at work translating and publishing those works. He also composed many original books of his own.

Nicodemus attained the rank of megaloskhemos ("Great Schema"), the highest degree for orthodox monks.

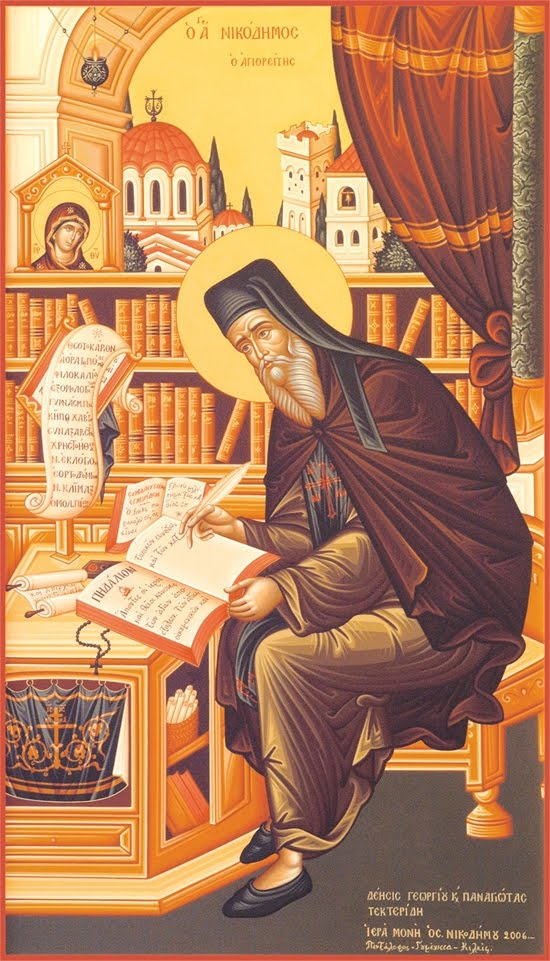
Icon of Saint Nikodemos the Hagiorite.

== Major works ==
Another of his famous works is the Enchiridion of Counsels (or "Handbook of Spiritual Counsel"), written by Nicodemus at the suggestion of his cousin Hierotheos, who had recently been made Bishop of Euripos. This handbook on the religious life, aimed at clergy and lay Christians alike, continues to be influential on Greek spirituality to this day. The work has been described as a theological-ethical tract that displays both deep psychological insight and a keen scientific mind.

He was not ignorant of the Western spiritual writers, and even published reworked versions of the Spiritual Exercises (Πνευματικά γυμνάσματα) of Ignatius of Loyola and The Spiritual Combat (βιβλίον καλούμενον· Αόρατος Πόλεμος) of Lorenzo Scupoli.

== See also ==
- Theosis
- Theoria
- Ritual purification
- Praxis
- Sacred Heart as a Catholic doctrine
- Peter of Damascus
