= Paisius Velichkovsky =

Eastern Orthodox monk and theologian (1722–1794)

Saint Paisius Velichkovsky
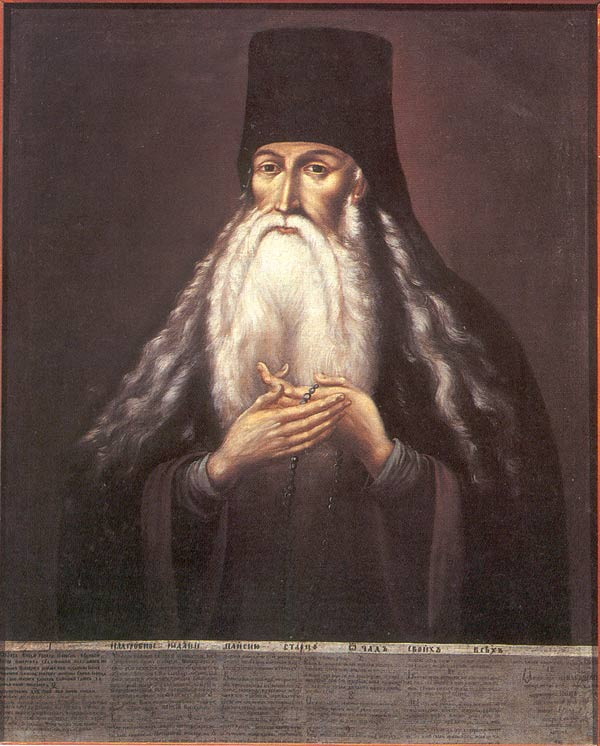
- 18th-century portrait of Paisius of Neamt.

Venerable
- Born: December 20, 1722; Poltava, Cossack Hetmanate (now Ukraine)
- Died: 15 November 1794 (aged 71); Neamț Monastery
- Venerated in: Eastern Orthodoxy
- Canonized: July 20, 1982 and 6 June 1988, Skete of St. Elias on Mount Athos and Trinity Lavra of St. Sergius by 1988 Local Council of the Russian Orthodox Church, (Patriarch Pimen I of Moscow)
- Feast: 15 November
- Patronage: Monastics

Paisius Velichkovsky or Wieliczkowski (Paisie de la Neamţ in Romanian; Паисий Величковский in Russian; Паїсій Величковський in Ukrainian; 20 December 1722 – 15 November 1794) was an Eastern Orthodox monk and theologian who helped spread staretsdom or the concept of the spiritual elder to the Slavic world. He is a pivotal figure in Orthodox Church history.

== Life ==
A Ukrainian by birth, Pyotr Velichkovsky was born on December 21, 1722, in Poltava, where his father, Ivan, was a priest in the city cathedral. He was the eleventh of twelve children. His grandfather was the poet Ivan Velichkovsky.

In 1735, he was sent to study at the Kiev Theological Academy. In 1741, he became a rasophore monk, taking the name of “Platon”. However, his monastery was soon closed, because of the political stresses during the time, and he entered the Pechersky Lavra at Kiev. Here he was influenced by the monk Ignatii, who told him about the hesychastic fervor he had found in Romanian monasteries. During the lent of 1743, Platon travelled to the monastic environments of the Dălhăuţi, the Trăisteni, and the Carnul Sketes. The first two Moldavian communities were under the spiritual eldership of Basil of Poiana Mărului, who became an important formative influence on Platon's spiritual life, teaching him about the Prayer of the Heart. The third Skete was located in Wallachia. All of them followed the Athonite hesychast observances.

In 1746, at age twenty-four, in order to perfect his monastic experience, he moved on Mount Athos, where he made his way to the Pantocrator monastery, and was assigned to live in its small Kiparis Skete. He spent the next four years in solitary life and prayer, living in extreme poverty. In 1750, he was visited by his former Starets, Basil of Poiana Mărului, who came on the Holy Mountain, and tonsured him as a lesser schema monk, with the name of Paisius. Following Basil's advice, he decided to move away from the strict solitary life, and became a renowned leader of a Hesychastic skete, formed of Romanian and Slavonic disciples. In 1758 Paisius was ordained into priesthood by Bishop Gregory Rasca, and the community's rapid growth required them to move into the larger Skete of St. Elias.

Paisius perceived that spiritual life must be grounded in the study of the patristic ascetic texts. He began to collect and painstakingly copy out the writings of the ancient Holy Fathers using them as a guide in the spiritual life. His teachings attracted a number of disciples desiring guidance in the practice of unceasing prayer. Paisius wrote theological epistles to his disciples and translated into Church Slavonic a large number of Greek theological writings, including the Philokalia. Paisius remained on Mt Athos for a total of seventeen years, copying Greek patristic books and translating them into Slavonic.

In 1764, when Paisius was forty-two, Prince Grigore III Ghica of Moldavia asked him to come in his country, to preside over the revival of monastic life. Thereupon, he and 64 of his disciples moved to Moldavia, at the Dragomirna monastery, in Bucovina. Here Paisius continued his activity on transcribing and translating patristic sources. One of his disciples, the monk Raphael also translated a selection of texts from the Philokalia in Romanian. The community at Dragomirna grew quickly, gathering around 350 monks. However, after Bucovina was annexed by the Austrian Empire, Paisius and his community eventually relocated at the Neamț Monastery, in 1779, during the vigil of the Dormition Feast. The new community grew to 700 monks, and it soon became a centre of pilgrimage, but also of refugee movement. Here he completed the Slavonic translation of the Philokalia, which in 1793 was printed in Russia. In 1790, Paisius received the Great Schema, and was elevated to the rank of Archimandrite, by Bishop Ambrose of Poltava (who visited his monastery). He was now also acting as vicar to the Metropolitan of Moldavia.

His efforts contributed to a dynamic renewal of hesychastic monastic life in 18th century Orthodoxy, and on into the present era. Many of his own disciples (several of whom became spiritual masters in their own right), took his teachings and mission to Russia, where they founded new monasteries dedicated to Hesychast traditions. He exerted immense influence on the startsy of the Optina Monastery both through his translations and through his personal disciples, such as Feodor Ushakov. Paisius's translation of Philokalia was one of the favourite books of Seraphim of Sarov, who received blessing to go to Sarov for spiritual devotion from the Paisius' disciple Dosifei of Kiev. Paisius died on November 15, 1794, at the age of seventy-two.

== The Jesus Prayer ==
One of the most famous books on the Jesus Prayer is the Way of the Pilgrim. This book is the story of the spiritual experiences of an unidentified pilgrim who wanders from place to place in Ukraine and Russia in the nineteenth century, praying the Prayer of Jesus Christ many times. Moscow Theological Academy professor Aleksey Pentkovsky identified this unknown pilgrim, as Arseny Troyepolsky, a Ukrainian priest-monk who moved around various Ukrainian and then Russian monasteries. In this book, and a number of others, none of which carry the author's name, Arseny writes extensively about Paisius Velichkovsky and Ukrainian saints.

== Veneration ==
Paisius is venerated for his personal holiness, and his revival of monasticism and spirituality in Romania, Ukraine and Russia, which had suffered under the reforms of Peter I and Catherine II. He revived the ancient teaching on the Jesus Prayer, a teaching almost forgotten in Russia.

The spiritual and cultural center in the Church of the Dormition, Poltava is named for Paisius.

At the opening of the Center on November 27, 2008, Filaret Denysenko gave a speech as following, "The importance of Velichkovsky’s life is not only in that he prayed for us sinners, but also in that he showed us the way every Christian should be going." Filaret said that the "Doctrine of Paisius Velichkovsky is important because it showed the way to the eternal life and gave an example of how to live on earth. This does not mean that everyone should go to a monastery, but it does mean that everyone should think about the good, the sanctity, and purity of heart."

In honor of the memory of Poltava native, Paisius Velichkovsky, the Poltava Eparchy of the UOC-KP has established a prize to be awarded to people who contribute to the revival of spiritual life in Poltava, actively working in the public sector, science, art, and culture.

Saint Paisius Velichkovsky Orthodox Church in Livorno, Italy, is named for him.

The Romanian Orthodox Church in Liverpool, United Kingdom is dedicated to Saint Paisius of Neamt.
