= Kallistos Ware =

English bishop and theologian (1934–2022)

His Eminence Kallistos Ware
- Metropolitan of Diokleia
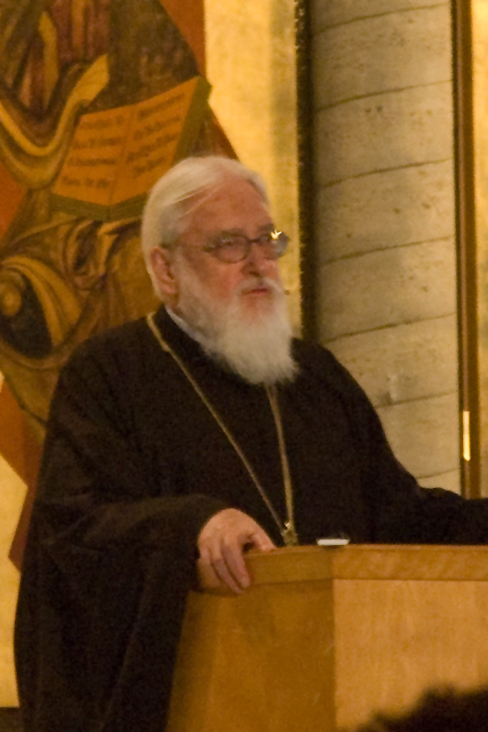
- Ware speaking at Ascension Greek Orthodox Cathedral of Oakland, California, in 2008
- Church: Ecumenical Patriarchate of Constantinople
- Archdiocese: Archdiocese of Thyateira and Great Britain
- See: Diokleia
- Installed: 1982
- Term ended: 24 August 2022
- Predecessor: Maximos (Aghiorgoussis)

Orders
- Ordination: 1966
- Consecration: 1982

Personal details
- Born: Timothy Richard Ware; 11 September 1934 Bath, Somerset, England
- Died: 24 August 2022 (aged 87) Oxford, England
- Denomination: Eastern Orthodox Church
- Education: Westminster School; Magdalen College, Oxford

Metropolitan Kallistos (born Timothy Richard Ware, 11 September 1934 – 24 August 2022) was an English bishop and theologian of the Eastern Orthodox Church. From 1982, he held the titular bishopric of Diokleia in Phrygia (Greek: Διόκλεια Φρυγίας), later made a titular metropolitan bishopric in 2007, under the Ecumenical Patriarchate of Constantinople. He was one of the best-known modern Eastern Orthodox hierarchs and theologians. From 1966 to 2001, he was Spalding Lecturer of Eastern Orthodox Studies at the University of Oxford.

== Early life and ordination ==
Born Timothy Richard Ware on 11 September 1934 to an Anglican family in Bath, Somerset, he was educated at Westminster School in London (to which he had won a King's Scholarship) and Magdalen College, Oxford, where he took a double first in classics as well as reading theology.

On 14 April 1958, at the age of 24, he converted to the Eastern Orthodox Church. He described his first contacts with Orthodoxy and the growing attraction of the Eastern Orthodox Church in an autobiographical text entitled "My Journey to the Orthodox Church". While still a layman, he spent six months in Canada at a monastery of the Russian Orthodox Church Outside of Russia. Thoroughly conversant in Modern Greek, Ware became an Eastern Orthodox monk at the Monastery of Saint John the Theologian in Patmos, Greece. He also frequented other major centres of Orthodoxy, such as Jerusalem and Mount Athos.

In 1966, he was ordained to the priesthood within the Ecumenical Patriarchate and was tonsured as a monk, receiving the name "Kallistos".

== Professional and ecclesiastical life ==
In 1966, Ware became Spalding Lecturer at the University of Oxford in Eastern Orthodox studies, a position he held for 35 years until his retirement. In 1970, he was appointed to a fellowship at Pembroke College, Oxford. In 1982, he was consecrated to the episcopate as an auxiliary bishop with the title Bishop of Diokleia (in Phrygia) in the Archdiocese of Thyateira and Great Britain of the Ecumenical Patriarchate. Following his consecration, Ware continued to teach at the University of Oxford and served in the Greek Orthodox parish in Oxford. During the 1990s, he was an active participant in the Kyivan Church Study Group which sought methods of Christian unity on association with the Metropolis of Kyiv. From his retirement in 2001, Ware continued to publish and give lectures on Orthodox Christianity. He served as chairman of the board of directors of the Institute for Orthodox Christian Studies in Cambridge, and was chair of the Friends of Orthodoxy on Iona (Scotland) and the Friends of Mount Athos. On 30 March 2007, the Holy Synod of the Ecumenical Patriarchate elevated the Diocese of Diokleia in Phrygia to a titular metropolitan diocese and Ware to the rank of metropolitan.

In 2017, Ware was awarded the Lambeth Cross for Ecumenism by the Archbishop of Canterbury "for his outstanding contribution to Anglican–Orthodox theological dialogue".

== Death ==
In August 2022, Ware's caregivers reported he was in critical condition and "approaching the end of his life". He died at home in Oxford in the early hours of 24 August 2022 at age 87, and was buried in Wolvercote Cemetery on 1 September.

== Publications ==
Ware was a prolific author and lecturer. He authored or edited over a dozen books, numerous articles in a wide range of periodicals, and essays in books on many subjects, as well as providing prefaces, forewords, or introductions to many other books. He is perhaps best known as the author of The Orthodox Church, published when he was a layman in 1963 and subsequently revised several times. In 1979, he produced a companion volume, The Orthodox Way. He collaborated in the translation and publication of major Orthodox ascetic and liturgical texts. Together with G. E. H. Palmer and Philip Sherrard, he translated the Philokalia; and with Mother Mary, he produced the Lenten Triodion and Festal Menaion. St Vladimir's Seminary Press published a Festschrift in his honour in 2003: Abba, The Tradition of Orthodoxy in the West, Festschrift for Bishop Kallistos (Ware) of Diokleia, eds. John Behr, Andrew Louth, Dimitri Conomos (New York: SVS Press, 2003). In 2025, St. Vladimir's Seminary Press released the second of two volumes of Ware's collected works, In the Image of the Father. Volume 1, The Inner Kingdom, had been published by SVS Press in 2000. In 2025 SVS Press also released Ware's posthumous memoirs, Reminiscences and Recollections, based on a series of private interviews Ware gave between 2011 and 2016 with Dimitri Conomos.

== Academic honours ==
For his outstanding contributions to Orthodox theology, Metropolitan Kallistos was awarded honorary doctorates from Lawrence University of Wisconsin (2001), St. Vladimir's Orthodox Theological Seminary (2011), Cluj-Napoca University, the Ss Cyril and Methodius Theological Institute (2014), the University of Belgrade, the St. Sergius Orthodox Theological Institute, and New Georgian University (2018).

== Books ==
- The Orthodox Church (1st ed. Pelican, 1963; 2nd ed. Penguin, 1993 ISBN 0-14-014656-3; 3rd. ed., Penguin, 2015 ISBN 978-0-14-198063-8).
- Eustratios Argenti: A Study of the Greek Church under Turkish Rule (Clarendon, 1964, ASIN B0006BMI94; reprint with a new Introduction, Wipf and Stock, 2013 ISBN 978-1-62564-082-6).
- The Festal Menaion (translated with Mother Mary) (Faber & Faber, 1977 ISBN 978-1-878997-00-5).
- (Editor with Colin Davey), Anglican–Orthodox Dialogue: The Moscow Statement Agreed by the Anglican–Orthodox Joint Doctrinal Commission 1976 (London: SPCK, 1977 ISBN 978-0-281-02992-1).
- The Lenten Triodion (translated with Mother Mary) (Faber and Faber 1978; St. Tikhon's Seminary Press, 2002 ISBN 1-878997-51-3).
- The Philokalia: The Complete Text (translated with G. E. H. Palmer and Philip Sherrard. London: Faber and Faber. Vol. 1, 1979 ISBN 0-571-11377-X; Vol. 2, 1982 ISBN 0-571-15466-2; Vol. 3, 1986 ISBN 0-571-17525-2; Vol. 4, 1999 ISBN 0-571-19382-X; Vol. 5, 2023 ISBN 978-0-571-11728-4).
- The Orthodox Way (Mowbray, 1979 ISBN 0-264-66578-3).
- Communion and Intercommunion: A Study of Communion and Intercommunion Based on the Theology and Practice of the Orthodox Church (Light & Life, 1980; rev.ed. 2002 ISBN 0-937032-20-4).
- The Power of the Name – The Jesus Prayer in Orthodox Spirituality (SLG Press, 1982 ISBN 978-0-551-01690-3).
- Praying with Orthodox Tradition (Abingdon, 1990 ISBN 0-281-04431-7).
- How Are We Saved?: The Understanding of Salvation in the Orthodox Tradition (Light & Life, 1996 ISBN 1-880971-22-4).
- The Ordination of Women in the Orthodox Church (with Elisabeth Behr-Sigel) (Geneva: WCC Publications, 2000 ISBN 978-2-8254-1336-4).
- The Inner Kingdom: Collected Works, Vol. 1 (St. Vladimir's Seminary Press, 2000 ISBN 0-88141-209-0).
- Orthodox Theology in the Twenty-First Century (Geneva: World Council of Churches, 2012 ISBN 978-2-8254-1571-9).

=== Posthumous publications ===
- In the Image of the Father: Collected Works, Vol. 2 (St. Vladimir's Seminary Press, 2025 ISBN 9780881417746)
- Reminiscences and Recollections, edited by Dimitri Conomos, Graham Speake, and Walker Thompson (St. Vladimir's Seminary Press, 2025 ISBN 978-0-88141-763-0)

== Selected articles ==
- "Review of Panagiotis N. Trembelas, Dogmatique de l'Église orthodoxe," Eastern Churches Review 3, 4 (1971), 477–480.
- "God Hidden and Revealed: The Apophatic Way and the Essence-Energies Distinction", Eastern Churches Review 7 (1975).
- "The Debate about Palamism", Eastern Churches Review 9 (1977).
- "Wolves and Monks: Life on the Holy Mountain Today", Sobornost 5, 2 (1983).
- "Athos after Ten Years: The Good News and the Bad", Sobornost 15, 1 (1993).
- "Through Creation to the Creator", Third Marco Pallis Memorial Lecture, Ecotheology, 2 (London: Friends of the centre, 1996) <www.incommunion.org/2004/12/11/through-creation-to-the-creator> (12.03.2011).
- "Dare We Hope for the Salvation of All?" Theology Digest, 45.4 (1998). Reprinted in The Inner Kingdom (Crestwood, NY: St. Vladimir's Seminary Press, 2001).
- "Man, Woman and the Priesthood of Christ", in Thomas Hopko, ed., Women and the Priesthood (Crestwood, NY: St Vladimir's Seminary Press, revised edition, 1999).
- "God Immanent yet Transcendent: The Divine Energies according to Saint Gregory Palamas" in Philip Clayton and Arthur Peacocke, eds., In Whom We Live and Move and Have Our Being: Panentheistic Reflections on God's Presence in a Scientific World (Grand Rapids, MI: Eerdmans, 2004) (ISBN 978-0-8028-0978-0).
- "Sobornost and Eucharistic Ecclesiology: Aleksei Khomiakov and His Successors", International Journal for the Study of the Christian Church 11, 2-3 (2011).
- "Orthodox Theology Today: Trends and Tasks", International Journal for the Study of the Christian Church 12, 2 (2012).

== Selected lectures ==
- "The Present and Future of Orthodox Theology" (New York, St. Vladimir's Orthodox Seminary, 8 September 2011)
- "Churches of the Christian East" (Fairfax, VA, Orientale Lumen Foundation)
- "Mystical Theology of the Eastern Fathers" (Fairfax, VA, Orientale Lumen Foundation)
