= Hesychius of Sinai =

Byzantine theologian and monk

Hesychius of Sinai was a hieromonk of Saint Catherine's Monastery on Mount Sinai, and an ascetic author of the Byzantine period in literature.

Nothing definite is known concerning his career or the exact time at which he lived. Only fragments of the literary remains of this author have been preserved, and they have still to be collected and separately criticized. In manuscripts, as a rule, he is given the honorary title of "Our Holy Father" and, in cases where the authenticity of this title on a manuscript is certain, it is sufficient to distinguish him from others of the same name, and especially from the celebrated Hesychius of Jerusalem.

He is included in the Synaxarion of the Greek Orthodox Church, which states that he was the Hegumen of Saint Catherine's Monastery on Mount Sinai in the 7th century, and his feast day is held on March 29.

== Attribution ==
Examination of the Bible text on which the treatises of one or the other Hesychius are based is just as important a test as this external criterion; thus, Hesychius of Sinai in his Bible quotations regularly follows the version of the Codex Sinaiticus. How much of the literary material in the Migne edition of the works of the Fathers published under the title of "Hesychius, Presbyter of Jerusalem", should properly be ascribed to Hesychius of Sinai, can only be determined by monographic investigation. The pivotal point about which such investigation would turn is a collection of 200 ascetic maxims. Migne attributes these to Hesychius of Jerusalem under a pseudonym, but they should, without doubt, be credited to Hesychius of Sinai. For the author of these maxims acknowledges, by a play on words (ho hesychias pheronymos), that his name is Hesychius and that he is a Basilian monk; furthermore a number of manuscripts support this intrinsic evidence. The text of the Migne edition could be completed and improved to particular advantage from English MSS. The fact that the maxims are dedicated to a certain Theodulus has given rise in certain manuscripts to the erroneous statement that Theodulus was their author. It cannot be determined here how many of these maxims were derived from older ascetics or how many were adopted by later ones. It is probable that the ascetic and Biblical-ascetic fragments Turin Codices under the name of "Our Holy Father Hesychius" should also be attributed to Hesychius of Sinai.
