= Nepsis =

Eastern Orthodox concept of wakefulness

Nepsis (Greek: νῆψις) is a concept in Orthodox Christian theology. It means wakefulness or watchfulness and constitutes a condition of sobriety acquired following a period of catharsis. St. Hesychios the Priest defines nepsis as "a continual fixing and halting of thought at the entrance to the heart."

== Etymology ==
The term comes from the New Testament's First Epistle of Peter (5:8, νήψατε, γρηγορήσατε. ὁ ἀντίδικος ὑμῶν διάβολος ὡς λέων ὠρυόμενος περιπατεῖ ζητῶν τινα καταπιεῖν — NIV: Be alert and of sober mind. Your enemy the devil prowls around like a roaring lion looking for someone to devour). There nepsis appears in a verb form, in the imperative mood, as an urgent command to vigilance and awakeness: "be alert and awake".

== Context ==
Perhaps most associated with Orthodox monasticism, innumerable references to nepsis are made in The Philokalia (the full title of The Philokalia being The Philokalia of the Neptic Fathers). Parallels have been drawn between nepsis and Jewish devekut.

== Relation to asceticism ==
In Orthodox Christianity, the struggle against the corruption of the passions is conducted through ascetic effort to purify the soul (asceticism from Greek: askesis "exercise"). At the advanced stages this involves "bringing the mind into the heart" ("mind" is a substitution for the tricky-to-translate Greek nous (νοῦς), which here indicates that faculty of the soul by which man enters into communion with God). Purification of the soul, which is achieved only through the help of divine grace, is pursued through one's efforts to fulfill the commandments of Christ, participation in the Holy Mysteries of the Christian Orthodox Church, private prayer including devotion to the Jesus Prayer, fasting according to the Church calendar, study of Holy Scripture and the lives of the saints, and vigilant watchfulness over the thoughts to prevent sinful thoughts from becoming sinful actions, and then passions.

As the Christian becomes purified, in time he reaches the stage of theoria or illumination. At this point, the contemplative life begins. All ascetic practice must be understood as simply the means by which the goal of Christian life is pursued. This is the acquisition of the Holy Spirit, which is called theosis, meaning the "deification" of man. According to St. Athanasius and others, "God became man so that man can become god."

== See also ==
Christianity

- Hesychasm
- Hesychia
- Nous
- Prayer of the Heart
- Theoria
- Theosis (Eastern Orthodox theology)
