= Macarius of Corinth =

Eastern Orthodox mystic

Saint Macarius of Corinth
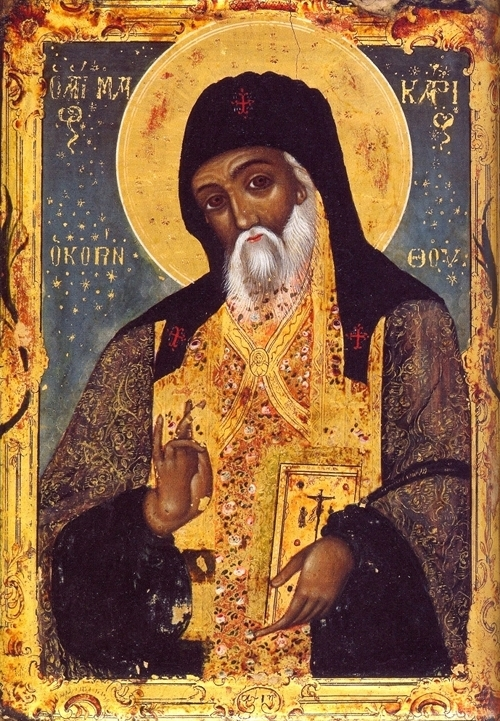
- Born: 1731; Corinth, Greece
- Died: April 17, 1805; Hermitage of St. Peter, Chios
- Venerated in: Eastern Orthodox Church
- Feast: April 17

Macarius of Corinth (also Makarios; born Michael Notaras, Μιχαὴλ Νοταρᾶς; Greek: Μακάριος Κορίνθου; 1731–1805) was Metropolitan bishop of Corinth, was a mystic and spiritual writer who worked to revive and mostly sustain the Eastern Orthodox Church under Turkish rule. He is most famous for working with Nicodemus of the Holy Mountain in collecting and compiling the ascetic text of the Philokalia.

== Prayer of the Heart ==
With his friend Nicodemus, Makarios compiled the five tomes of the Philokalia that were first published in Venice in 1782. It was the publication of these sacred and spiritual texts that led to a renewal of the hesychast movement within Eastern Orthodox.

== See also ==
- Theosis (Eastern Orthodox theology)
- Theoria
- Ritual purification
- Praxis
