= Hesychia =

Philosophical concept of stillness

The Greek term hesychia (ἡσυχία, Greek pronunciation: [isiˈçia]) is a concept that can be translated as "stillness, rest, quiet, silence".

== In Christianity ==
In the Eastern Orthodox Christian mystical tradition of hesychasm, hesychia refers to a state of stillness and peace that is obtained through extreme ascetical struggle, prayer, and the constant contemplation of God. The attainment of hesychia is a central theme discussed in hesychast literature.

Chapter 2 of the Systematic Sayings of the Desert Fathers is dedicated to the topic of hesychia.

== In Neoplatonism ==
The term is also used in Neoplatonic texts such as the Enneads.

== Other languages ==
Equivalent terms in other languages include Syriac shelya (šelya).

== See also ==
- Monastic silence
- Apatheia
- Inner peace
- Tranquility
- Centering prayer
- Quietism (Christian philosophy)
- Christianity and Hellenistic philosophy
- Neoplatonism and Christianity
- Mauna (silence) in Hinduism
