= Basileias =

Ancient hospital in Caeserea, Cappadocia

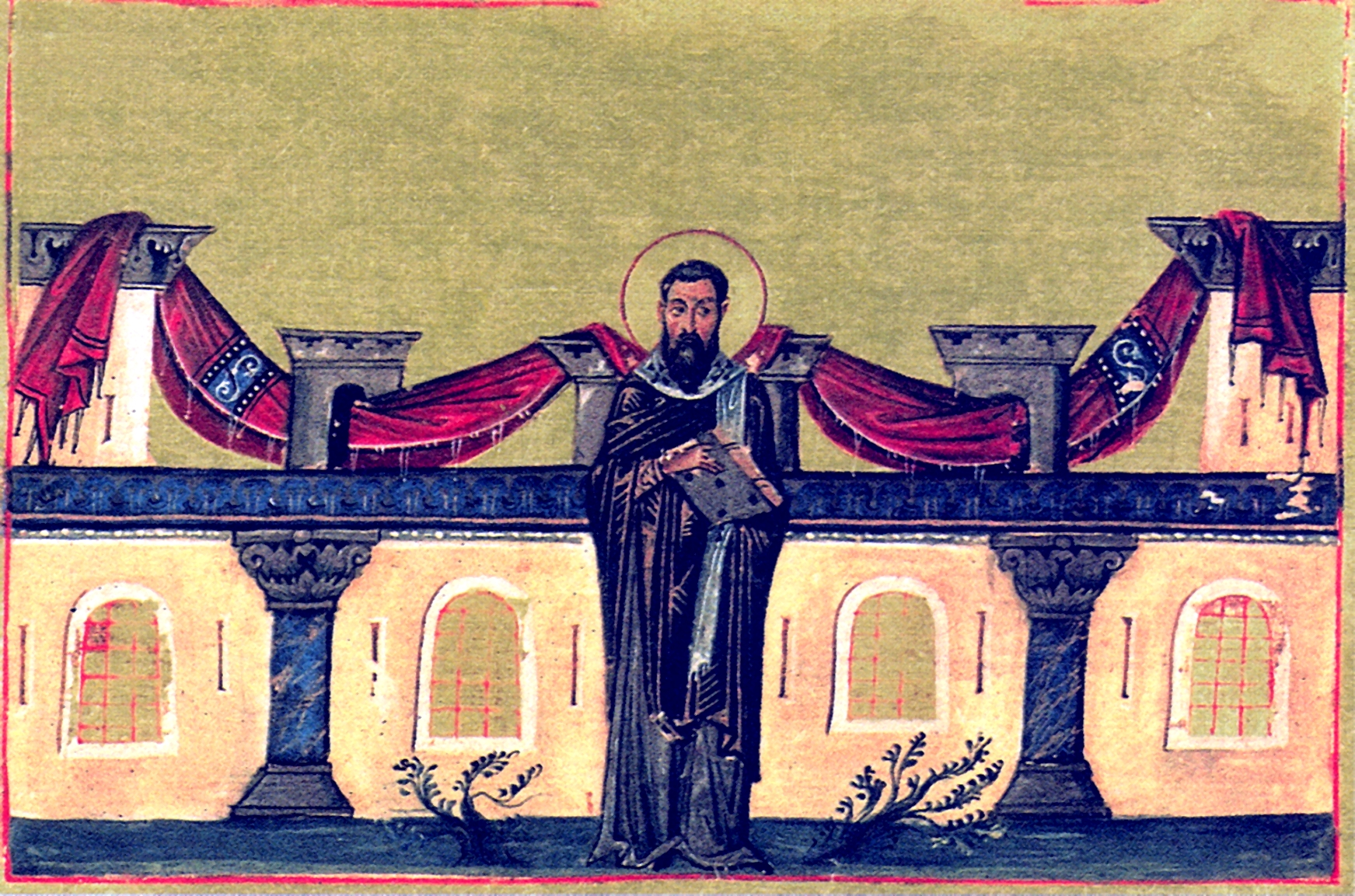
- Basil of Caesarea in the Menologion of Basil II. f.288
- Type: Hospital and monastery
- Cultures: Byzantine Empire
- Location: Caeserea, Byzantine Empire (mod. Kayseri, Turkey)
- Region: Cappadocia

History
- Built: ca. 372 AD
- Built by: Basil of Caesarea
- Abandoned: after the middle of the 5th century

The Basileias (also Basiliados) was an ancient multi-functional philanthropic and monastic institution in Caesarea Mazaka in Cappadocia founded in the late fourth century by Basil of Caesarea, after whom it was named. While the exact nature of the Basileias has been debated, it may have been the first hospital for which evidence survives or the first hospital that provided comprehensive services to the wider public in one place, marking a major advance in medical care.

== History ==
=== Background ===
Christian charity and care for the poor and sick was rooted in the concept of agape and the principle that love of God requires a love of mankind, thus requiring a manifestation of this love in the care for one's brother. After the legalisation of Christianity, a number of discrete Christian institutions arose in the 320s that were dedicated to either provide shelter for travellers, care for foundlings, homes for elderly, and almshouses for the poor. Basil may have also been inspired by the care Egyptian monastic communities provided to their members, as attested by Pachomian monasticism (and later Shenoute's White monastery federation).

While the construction has been sometimes portrayed as responses to a severe famine that might have struck Asia minor between 368 and 370 or a sudden outbreak of leprosy, these reasons do not hold up and are not connected with the construction of the Basileias by ancient writers.

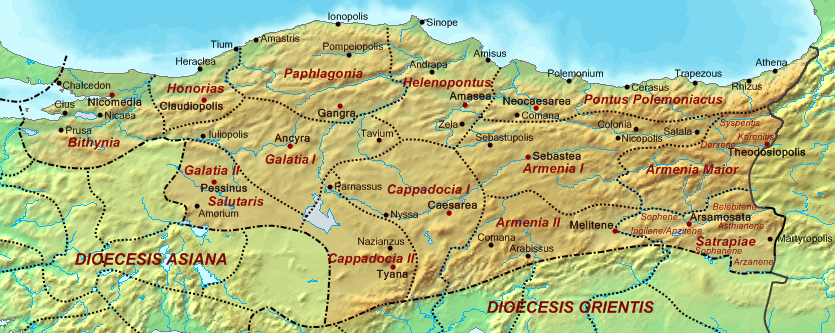
Caeserea as situated in the province Cappadocia I in the year 400 AD

=== During Basil's life ===
The exact date when the construction of the Basileias begun or was finished is not known, though it is typically set in the 370s. Theodoret writes in his Church History that emperor Valens gifted Basil land for the poor during his visit to Cappadocia in January 372. This could likely indicate that the Basileias did not exist by that time and that it was constructed on the land given by Valens in 372. This sets the Basileias, whose precise location is unknown, in contrast to the other ecclesiastic guest houses and soup kitchens of the fourth century which were typically situated within the towns and cities.

The exact nature of the Basileias has been debated. Apart from the eponymous appellation, contemporary writers referred to the hospital in a number of terms; Basil himself called it a ptochotropheion (poorhouse), a xenodocheion (hostel) and a katagogion (rest house). The complex must have been extensive, including housing for various types of residents, a hostel for visitor, at least one church, an adjacent monastery and likely a full range of supporting facilities such as storehouses, kitchens, baths, workshops and stables. Apart from the sick, elderly, poor and travellers, the Basileias also had a keluphokomeion, a "place for the care of lepers". Here, the lepers were housed and fed, their illness treated and bodies cared for, though they had no hope of recovery; such a concern with the terminally ill was virtually unheard of in medical circles up to this point. While most of the staff came from the adjacent monastic community who were trained in there trade, they had apparently rotating shifts in order to not be overburdened or be distracted from prayer and were aided by professional doctors.

=== End ===
The Basileias continued to operate at least into the middle of the fifth century, if not longer. Hospitals modelled after Basil's spread throughout the Eastern Empire (and possibly later to the West), mostly administered by monastic communities or bishops and administered by church funds.

== Sources ==
The Basileias is the most mentioned philanthropic institution of its time, making it the best documented and, seemingly, the best-known Christian foundation of antiquity. Among the sources are the funeral oration for Basil by Gregory of Nazianzus, descriptions by a number of ecclesiastic writers and Basil's own remarks in his correspondence and ascetic writing.

== Legacy ==
The novel aspect of Basil's foundation was not its charitable aspect, or the care for the sick, lepers, poor, travellers, orphans or elderly, as other Christian institutions were already in place to take care of them. Rather the non-professional staff of doctors and medical attendance, the offering of inpatient care and the comprehensive nature of the institution mark a major advance in medical care. Regardless of the question of the innovation, the Basileias is of central importance because it is the first hospital for the wider public for which any significance exists. Crislip argues further, that Basil's work advanced the destigmatisation of the ill as sickness became something to contemplate and investigate rather than to shun.

Basil's philanthropic spirituality and hospital concept spread in the fifth century. Theodosius the Cenobiarch established three hospices specialising in healthcare that upheld the Basileian tradition and it is also probable that the monastery of Martyrius housed a Basileian hospital. The theology of compassion, that spiritual diseases can be healed by compassion for the sick, is also reflected in the letters of Barsanuphius and John the Prophet and the Life of Dositheus which describe the workings of the hospital at the Monastery of Seridus.

Nevertheless, while the Basileias served as model for later hospitals, it did not change the nature of the many already existing specialised institutions for the poor or sick, which continued to be more widespread.

== Bibliography ==
- Amundsen, D.W.; Ferngren, G.B. (6 December 2012). "Philanthropy in Medicine". In Shelp, E. E. (ed.). Beneficence and Health Care. Springer Science & Business Media. pp. 1–32. ISBN 978-94-009-7769-3.
- Caner, Daniel (2018). "Not a Hospital but a Leprosarium: Basil's Basilias and an Early Byzantine Concept of the Deserving Poor". Dumbarton Oaks Papers. 72. Washington, DC: Dumbarton Oaks, Trustees for Harvard University: 25–48.
- Crislip, Andrew Todd (2005). From Monastery to Hospital: Christian Monasticism & the Transformation of Health Care in Late Antiquity. University of Michigan Press. ISBN 978-0-472-11474-0.
- Ferngren, Gary B. (August 2016). Medicine and Health Care in Early Christianity. JHU Press. ISBN 978-1-4214-2006-6.
- Müller, Andreas (15 December 2009). ""All das ist Zierde für den Ort …". Das diakonisch-karitative Großprojekt des Basileios von Kaisareia". Zeitschrift für Antikes Christentum / Journal of Ancient Christianity. 13 (3): 452–474. doi:10.1515/ZAC.2009.31.
- Nam, Sung Hyun (29 June 2024). "Christian Perfection in Basilian Monastic Hospitals from the Fourth to Sixth Centuries". Religions. 15 (7): 793. doi:10.3390/rel15070793.
- Ziegler, Tiffany A. (13 October 2018). Medieval Healthcare and the Rise of Charitable Institutions: The History of the Municipal Hospital. Springer. ISBN 978-3-030-02056-9.
