= 520 =

Calendar year

520 in various calendars
- Gregorian calendar: 520; DXX
- Ab urbe condita: 1273
- Assyrian calendar: 5270
- Balinese saka calendar: 441–442
- Bengali calendar: −74 – −73
- Berber calendar: 1470
- Buddhist calendar: 1064
- Burmese calendar: −118
- Byzantine calendar: 6028–6029
- Chinese calendar: 己亥年 (Earth Pig); 3217 or 3010 — to — 庚子年 (Metal Rat); 3218 or 3011
- Coptic calendar: 236–237
- Discordian calendar: 1686
- Ethiopian calendar: 512–513
- Hebrew calendar: 4280–4281
- Hindu calendars
- Vikram Samvat: 576–577
- Shaka Samvat: 441–442
- Kali Yuga: 3620–3621
- Holocene calendar: 10520
- Iranian calendar: 102 BP – 101 BP
- Islamic calendar: 105 BH – 104 BH
- Javanese calendar: 407–408
- Julian calendar: 520; DXX
- Korean calendar: 2853
- Minguo calendar: 1392 before ROC 民前1392年
- Nanakshahi calendar: −948
- Seleucid era: 831/832 AG
- Thai solar calendar: 1062–1063
- Tibetan calendar: ས་མོ་ཕག་ལོ་ (female Earth-Boar); 646 or 265 or −507 — to — ལྕགས་ཕོ་བྱི་བ་ལོ་ (male Iron-Rat); 647 or 266 or −506

The Kingdom of East Anglia (6th century)

Year 520 (DXX) was a leap year starting on Wednesday of the Julian calendar. In the Roman Empire, it was known as the Year of the Consulship of Rusticus and Vitalianus (or, less frequently, year 1273 Ab urbe condita). The denomination 520 for this year has been used since the early medieval period, when the Anno Domini calendar era became the prevalent method in Europe for naming years.

== Events ==
=== By place ===
==== Byzantine Empire ====
- Priscian, Latin grammarian, writes the Institutiones Grammaticae ("Grammatical Foundations"). In Constantinople, he codifies this manuscript in 18 volumes, which will be widely used through the Middle Ages. It provides the raw material for the field of speculative grammar.
- July – Byzantine general Vitalian becomes consul, and is shortly later murdered, probably on the orders of Justinian, the nephew and heir-apparent of Emperor Justin I.

==== Britannia ====
- King Pabo Post Prydain of the Pennines (Northern England) abdicates his throne, and divides the kingdom between his two sons. He retires, as a hermit, to Anglesey.
- The Kingdom of East Anglia is formed, by the merging of the English counties of Norfolk and Suffolk, and perhaps the eastern part of The Fens (approximate date).
- King Budic II returns to Cornouaille (Brittany), to claim the Breton throne (approximate date).

==== Europe ====
- Ostrogothic ruler Theodoric the Great builds the Mausoleum of Theodoric as his future tomb in Ravenna (Italy).

==== Asia ====
- Bodhidharma, Buddhist monk, arrives in Luoyang. He spreads Buddhism and travels to the northern Chinese kingdom of Wei, to the Shaolin Monastery.
- The inauguration ceremony of the ‌President of the Republic of China‌ : starting from 1948, all elected presidents have taken the oath of office on May 20th, and this practice has become a formal convention after 1990.

=== By topic ===
==== Religion ====
- February 25 – Epiphanius is elected patriarch of Constantinople by Byzantine Emperor Justin I.
- The construction of the Basilica of San Vitale in Ravenna, is started (approximate date).
- The monastery of Seridus, where Barsanuphius and John the Prophet lived as hermits, is founded in the region of Gaza.

==== Chinese Merchants' Commercial Hype ====
In 1998, Taiwanese singer Mavis Fan first linked "520" to "I love you" in her song Digital Love, but this association did not gain widespread popularity at that time. It was not until 2010 that, driven by the promotion of businesses in mainland China, May 20th gradually developed into Valentine's Day.

The core reason behind this phenomenon is that in some Chinese dialects, the initial consonants /n/ and /l/ are easily confused, making the pronunciation of "520" (wǔ èr líng) sound somewhat similar to the Mandarin phrase "我爱你" (wǒ ài nǐ), which means "I love you".

However, in Cantonese, the pronunciation of "520" “唔易拎”(m4 ji6 ling1) has a completely different connotation: it means "not easy to carry", which metaphorically implies that romantic relationships are hard to sustain. Some Cantonese speakers also point out that 520 sounds very close to the phrase "唔要你" (m4 jiu3 nei5), which translates to "I don't want you".For this reason, the number of divorce registrations in Guangzhou on May 20th is slightly higher than the daily average.

In Hong Kong and Macau, some people who have accepted the cultural influence from Chinese mainland will also celebrate 520 as Valentine's Day, which has caused resentment among those who are committed to defending the Cantonese language, because treating 520 as Valentine's Day in Cantonese-speaking regions completely ignores the inherent homophonic meaning of 520 in Cantonese.

== Births ==
- Hou Andu, general of the Chen dynasty (d. 563)
- Justin II, emperor of the Byzantine Empire (d. 578)
- Malo, Welsh bishop (approximate date)
- Martin of Braga, missionary and archbishop (d. 580)
- Pope Pelagius II of Rome (d. 589)
- Radegund, Frankish princess (approx.)
- Zuhayr bin Abi Sulma, Arabian poet (approx.)

== Deaths ==
- January 19 – John of Cappadocia, patriarch of Constantinople
- July – Vitalian, Byzantine general, consul
- Abbán, Irish cult leader and saint (approx.)
- Ardgal mac Conaill, king of Uisneach (Ireland)
- Isidore of Alexandria, Neoplatonist philosopher (approximate date)
- Maximinus, Frankish abbot and saint (approximate date)
- Zu Gengzhi, Chinese mathematician (approx.)
