= 543 =

Calendar year

543 in various calendars
Gregorian calendar	543; DXLIII
Ab urbe condita	1296
Assyrian calendar	5293
Balinese saka calendar	464–465
Bengali calendar	−51 – −50
Berber calendar	1493
Buddhist calendar	1087
Burmese calendar	−95
Byzantine calendar	6051–6052
Chinese calendar	壬戌年 (Water Dog); 3240 or 3033 — to — 癸亥年 (Water Pig); 3241 or 3034
Coptic calendar	259–260
Discordian calendar	1709
Ethiopian calendar	535–536
Hebrew calendar	4303–4304
- Hindu calendars
Vikram Samvat	599–600
Shaka Samvat	464–465
Kali Yuga	3643–3644
Holocene calendar	10543
Iranian calendar	79 BP – 78 BP
Islamic calendar	81 BH – 80 BH
Javanese calendar	430–431
Julian calendar	543; DXLIII
Korean calendar	2876
Minguo calendar	1369 before ROC 民前1369年
Nanakshahi calendar	−925
Seleucid era	854/855 AG
Thai solar calendar	1085–1086
Tibetan calendar	ཆུ་ཕོ་ཁྱི་ལོ་ (male Water-Dog); 669 or 288 or −484 — to — ཆུ་མོ་ཕག་ལོ་ (female Water-Boar); 670 or 289 or −483

The Chalukya dynasty (543–753)

Year 543 (DXLIII) was a common year starting on Thursday of the Julian calendar, the 543rd year of the Common Era (CE) and Anno Domini (AD) designations, the 543rd year of the 1st millennium, the 43rd year of the 6th century, and the 4th year of the 540s decade. As of the start of 543, the Gregorian calendar was 2 days ahead of the Julian calendar, which was the dominant calendar of the time.

== Events ==
=== By place ===
==== Europe ====
- Spring – Siege of Naples (542–543): The Byzantine garrison (1,000 men) in Naples surrenders to the Ostrogoths, pressed by famine and demoralized by the failure of two relief efforts. The defenders are well treated by King Totila, and the garrison is allowed safe departure, but the city walls are partly razed.

==== Africa ====
- The fortress city of Old Dongola (modern Sudan) along the River Nile becomes the capital of the Kingdom of Makuria. Several churches are built, including the "Old Church" (approximate date).

==== Persia ====
- Summer – Khosrow I, Shahanshah of the Sasanian Empire, invades Syria again, and turns south towards Edessa to besiege the fortress city.
- The Hephthalites threaten the Sasanian Empire from the East. They extend their domain in Central Asia (approximate date).
- Battle of Anglon: A Byzantine invasion of Persarmenia is defeated by a much smaller force from the Sasanian Empire.

==== Asia ====
- King Pulakeshin I establishes the Chalukya dynasty in India. He extends his kingdom by conquering Vakataka and the west coast of Karnataka, giving him access to the valuable Arabian Sea trade routes.

=== By topic ===
==== Learning ====
- Approximate date – The Yupian (玉篇) Chinese dictionary is edited by Gu Yewang.

==== Religion ====
- The doctrine of apocatastasis is condemned by the Synod of Constantinople.
- Barsanuphius, a famous hermit close to Gaza, retreats fully from the world after the death of Seridus, abbot of the nearby monastery, and fellow hermit John the Prophet with whom he wrote over 850 letters to people seeking his advice and guidance. Aelianos follows Seridus as abbot of the monastery.

== Births ==
- Brunhilda, queen of Austrasia (approximate date)
- Columbanus, Irish missionary (d. 615)
- Jing Di, emperor of the Liang dynasty (d. 558)
- Wu Di, emperor of Northern Zhou (d. 578)

== Deaths ==
- Octa, king of Kent (approximate date) (b. 500)
- Adolius, Byzantine officer
- John the Prophet, Palestinian hermit and Desert Father
- Seridus of Gaza, Palestinian abbot
