= Jesus Prayer =

Short formulaic prayer in Christianity

The Jesus Prayer, (Note: Greek: προσευχὴ τοῦ Ἰησοῦ, romanized: prosefchí tou iisoú, lit. 'prayer to Jesus'; Syriac: ܨܠܘܬܐ ܕܝܫܘܥ, romanized: slotho d-yeshu'; Amharic, Geez and Tigrinya: እግዚኦ መሐረነ ክርስቶስ, romanized: igizi'o meḥarene kirisitosi. John Romanides uses Greek: προσευχή εν Πνεύματι, romanized: prosefchí en Pneúmati, lit. 'prayer by the Spirit', or Greek: νοερά προσευχή, romanized: noerá prosefchí, lit. 'noetic prayer'. "Note: We are still searching the Fathers for the term 'Jesus prayer'. We would very much appreciate it if someone could come up with a patristic quote in Greek.") also known as The Prayer, (Note: Greek: η ευχή, romanized: i efchí, lit. 'the wish'.) is a short formulaic prayer. It is most common in Eastern Christianity. There are multiple versions of this prayer, however the most widely used version is as follows:

Lord Jesus Christ, Son of God, have mercy on me, a sinner.

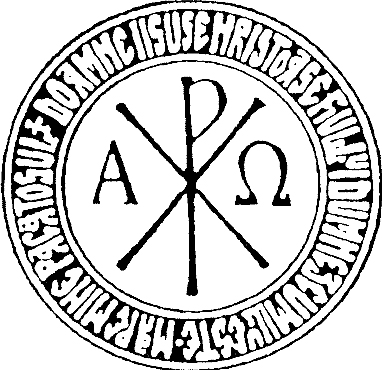
Christogram with the Jesus Prayer in Romanian: Doamne Iisuse Hristoase, Fiul lui Dumnezeu, miluieşte-mă pe mine păcătosul ("Lord Jesus Christ, Son of God, have mercy on me, a sinner")

It is often repeated continually as a part of personal ascetic practice, its use being an integral part of the Hermitic tradition of prayer known as hesychasm. (Note: Ancient Greek: ἡσυχάζω, isycházo, 'to keep stillness'.) The prayer is particularly important to the spiritual fathers of this tradition, such as in the Philokalia, as a method of cleaning and opening up the mind and after this the heart (kardia), brought about first by the Prayer of the Mind, or more precisely the Noetic Prayer (Νοερά Προσευχή; Noerá Proseyxí), and after this the Prayer of the Heart (Καρδιακή Προσευχή; Kardiakí Proseyxí). The Prayer of the Heart is considered to be the "Unceasing Prayer" that the Apostle Paul advocates in the New Testament. (Note: 1 Thes 5:17: Pray without ceasing.) Theophan the Recluse regarded the Jesus Prayer stronger than all other prayers by virtue of the power of the Holy Name of Jesus.

Though identified more closely with Eastern Christianity, the prayer is found in Western Christianity in the Catechism of the Catholic Church. It is also used in conjunction with the innovation of Anglican prayer beads. The prayer has been widely taught and discussed throughout the history of the Eastern Orthodox Church, Eastern Lutheran Churches and Eastern Catholic Churches. The ancient and original form did not include the words "a sinner", which were added later. The Eastern Orthodox theology of the Jesus Prayer as enunciated in the 14th century by Gregory Palamas was generally rejected by Latin Church theologians until the 20th century. Pope John Paul II called Gregory Palamas a great writer, and an authority on theology. He also spoke with appreciation of hesychasm as "that deep union of grace which Eastern theology likes to describe with the particularly powerful term theosis, 'divinization'", and likened the meditative quality of the Jesus Prayer to that of the Catholic rosary.

== Origins ==
The prayer's origin is the Egyptian desert, which was settled by the monastic Desert Fathers and Desert Mothers in the 5th century. It was found inscribed in the ruins of a cell from that period in the Egyptian desert.

A formula similar to the standard form of the Jesus Prayer is found in a letter attributed to John Chrysostom, who died in AD 407. This "Letter to an Abbot" speaks of "Lord Jesus Christ, son of God, have mercy" and "Lord Jesus Christ, son of God, have mercy on us" being used as ceaseless prayer. Ammonas of Egypt advised another monk to "always keep in your heart the words of the Publican" (God, be merciful to me a sinner, Luke 18:13), while Macarius of Egypt taught Evagrius Ponticus to say with each breath "Lord Jesus, have mercy on me. I bless you, my Lord Jesus", or when he is distressed, "My Lord Jesus, help me".

Early forms of the Jesus prayer are also mentioned in the context of Gazan monasticism; Saints Barsanuphius and John the Prophet recommended several formulae, including "Lord Jesus Christ, have mercy on me". Their chief disciple, Dorotheus of Gaza, later taught his disciple Dositheus to preserve the "remembrance of God" by saying continuously "Lord Jesus Christ, have mercy on me" and then at intervals "Son of God, help me".

What may be the earliest explicit reference to the Jesus Prayer in a form that is similar to that used today is in Discourse on Abba Philimon from the Philokalia. Philimon lived around AD 600. The version cited by Philimon is "Lord Jesus Christ, Son of God, have mercy upon me", which is apparently the earliest source to cite this standard version. While the prayer itself was in use by that time, John S. Romanides writes that "We are still searching the Fathers for the term 'Jesus prayer'."

A similar idea is recommended in the Ladder of Divine Ascent of John Climacus (circa 523–606), who recommends the regular practice of a monologistos, or one-worded "Jesus Prayer". The use of the Jesus Prayer according to the tradition of the Philokalia is the subject of the 19th century anonymous Russian spiritual classic The Way of a Pilgrim, also in the original form, without the addition of the words "a sinner".

== Eastern Orthodoxy ==
The hesychastic practice of the Jesus Prayer is founded on the biblical view by which God's name is conceived as the place of his presence. Orthodox mysticism has no images or representations. The mystical practice (the prayer and the meditation) doesn't lead to perceiving representations of God (see below Palamism). Thus, the most important means of a life consecrated to praying is the invoked name of God, as it is emphasized since the 5th century by the Thebaid anchorites, or by the later Athonite hesychasts. For the Orthodox the power of the Jesus Prayer comes not only from its content, but from the very invocation of Jesus' name.

=== Scriptural roots ===
The Jesus Prayer combines three Bible verses: the Christological hymn of the Pauline epistle Philippians 2:6–11 (verse 11: "Jesus Christ is Lord"), the Annunciation of Luke 1:31–35 (verse 35: "Son of God"), and the Parable of the Pharisee and the Publican of Luke 18:9–14, in which the Pharisee demonstrates the improper way to pray (verse 11: "God, I thank thee, that I am not as other men are, extortioners, unjust, adulterers, or even as this publican"), whereas the Publican prays correctly in humility (verse 13: "God be merciful to me a sinner"). (Note: "Orthodox tradition is aware that the heart, besides pumping blood, is, when conditioned properly, the place of communion with God by means of unceasing prayer, i.e. unceasing memory of God. The words of Christ", his Beatitudes in Matthew 5:3–10 (verse 8: "Μακάριοι οἱ καθαροὶ τῇ καρδίᾳ, ὅτι αὐτοὶ τὸν θεὸν ὄψονται", lit. 'Blessed are the pure in heart: for they shall see God'), "are taken very seriously because they have been fulfilled in all those who were graced with glorification both before and after the Incarnation. […] In the light of this one may turn to" the exhortations of Paul about "unceasing prayer" (Greek: "αδιάλειπτος προσευχή") in his 1 Thessalonians 5:16–22 (verse 17: "ἀδιαλείπτως προσεύχεσθε", lit. 'pray unceasingly'). "Luke was a student and companion of Paul, his writings presuppose and reflect this esoteric life in Christ." Closely related to Luke's Pharisee and the Publican of 18:9–14 (verse 13: "ὁ Θεός, ἱλάσθητί μοι τῷ ἁμαρτωλῷ", lit. 'God be merciful to me a sinner') are his Ten Lepers of 17:11–19 (verse 13: "Ἰησοῦ ἐπιστάτα, ἐλέησον ἡμᾶς", lit. 'Jesus, Master, have mercy on us') and his Blind near Jericho of 18:35–43 (verse 38: "Ἰησοῦ, υἱὲ Δαυίδ, ἐλέησόν με", lit. 'Jesus, thou son of David, have mercy on me'). Similar: Matthew 9:27–31, 20:29–34 (verses 9:27 and 20:30–31: "ἐλέησον ἡμᾶς, υἱὲ Δαυίδ", lit. 'son of David, have mercy on us'), Mark 10:46–52 (verse 47: "υἱὲ Δαυὶδ Ἰησοῦ, ἐλέησόν με", lit. 'Jesus, thou son of David, have mercy on me').)

=== Palamism, the underlying theology ===
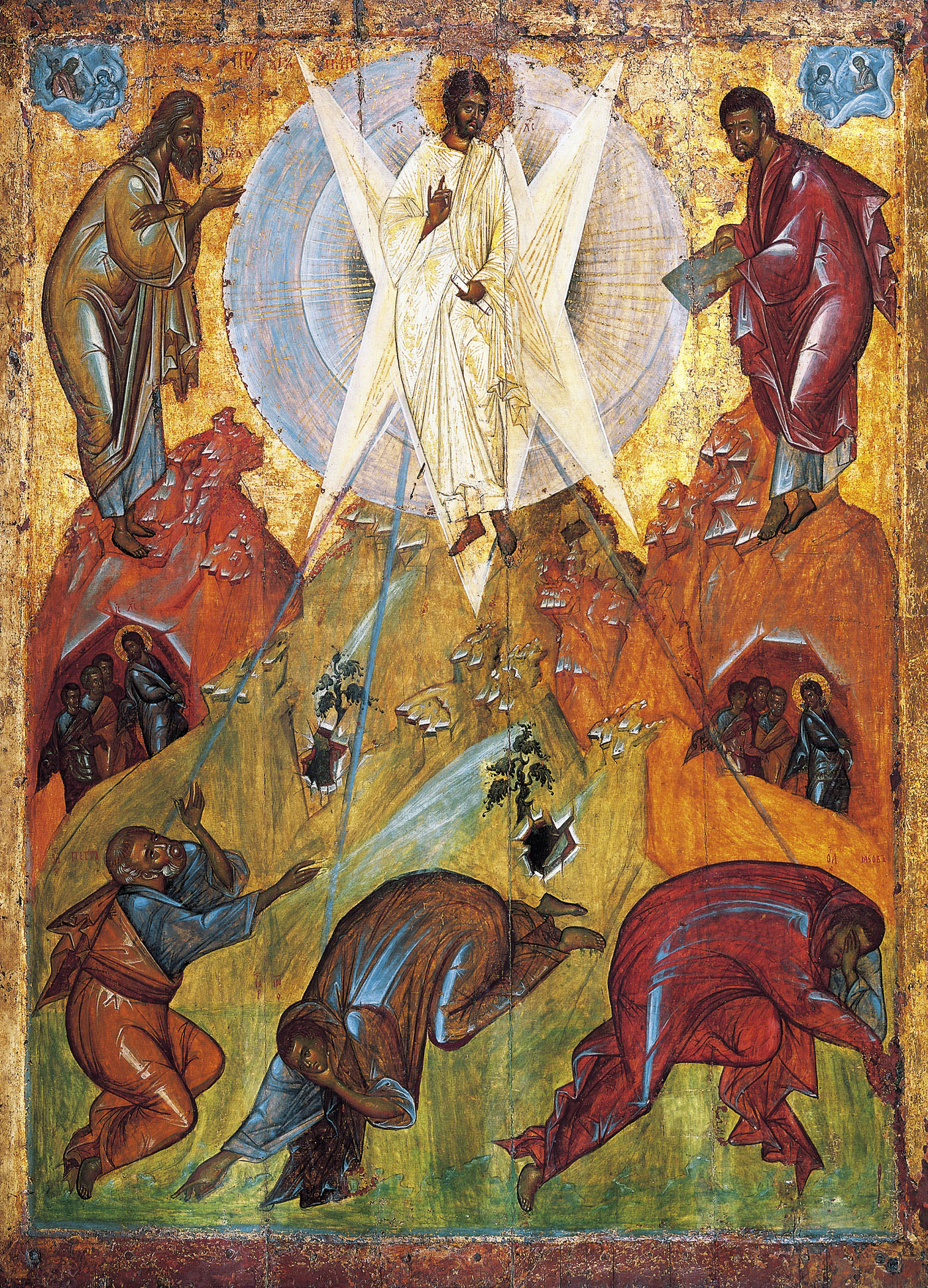
Icon of the Transfiguration of Jesus by Theophanes the Greek (15th century, Tretyakov Gallery, Moscow). Talking with Christ: Elijah (left) and Moses (right). Kneeling: Peter, James, and John

Apophatism (negative theology) is the main characteristic of the Eastern theological tradition. Incognoscibility is not conceived as agnosticism or refusal to know God, because the Eastern theology is not concerned with abstract concepts; it is contemplative, with a discourse on things above rational understanding. Therefore, dogmas are often expressed antinomically. This form of contemplation is experience of God, illumination, called the vision of God or, in Greek, theoria.

For the Eastern Orthodox the knowledge or noesis of the uncreated energies is usually linked to apophatism.

=== Repentance in Eastern Orthodoxy ===
The Eastern Orthodox Church holds a non-juridical view of sin, by contrast to the satisfaction view of atonement for sin as articulated in the West, firstly by Anselm of Canterbury (as debt of honor) and Thomas Aquinas (as a moral debt). The terms used in the East are less legalistic (grace, punishment), and more medical (sickness, healing) with less exacting precision. Sin, therefore, does not carry with it the guilt for breaking a rule, but rather the impetus to become something more than what men usually are. One repents not because one is or is not virtuous, but because human nature can change. Repentance (Ancient Greek: μετάνοια, metanoia, "changing one's mind") is not remorse, justification, or punishment, but a continual enactment of one's freedom, deriving from renewed choice and leading to restoration (the return to man's original state). This is reflected in the Mystery of Confession for which, not being limited to a mere confession of sins and presupposing recommendations or penalties, it is primarily that the priest acts in his capacity of spiritual father. The Mystery of Confession is linked to the spiritual development of the individual, and relates to the practice of choosing an elder to trust as his or her spiritual guide, turning to him for advice on the personal spiritual development, confessing sins, and asking advice.

As stated at the local Council of Constantinople in 1157, Christ brought his redemptive sacrifice not to the Father alone, but to the Trinity as a whole. In the Eastern Orthodox theology redemption is not seen as ransom. It is the reconciliation of God with man, the manifestation of God's love for humanity. Thus, it is not the anger of God the Father but His love that lies behind the sacrificial death of his son on the cross.

The redemption of man is not considered to have taken place only in the past, but continues to this day through theosis. The initiative belongs to God, but presupposes man's active acceptance (not an action only, but an attitude), which is a way of perpetually receiving God.

=== Distinctiveness from analogues in other religions ===
The practice of contemplative or meditative chanting is known in several religions including Buddhism, Hinduism, and Islam (e.g. japa, zikr). The form of internal contemplation involving profound inner transformations affecting all the levels of the self is common to the traditions that posit the ontological value of personhood.

== Practice ==
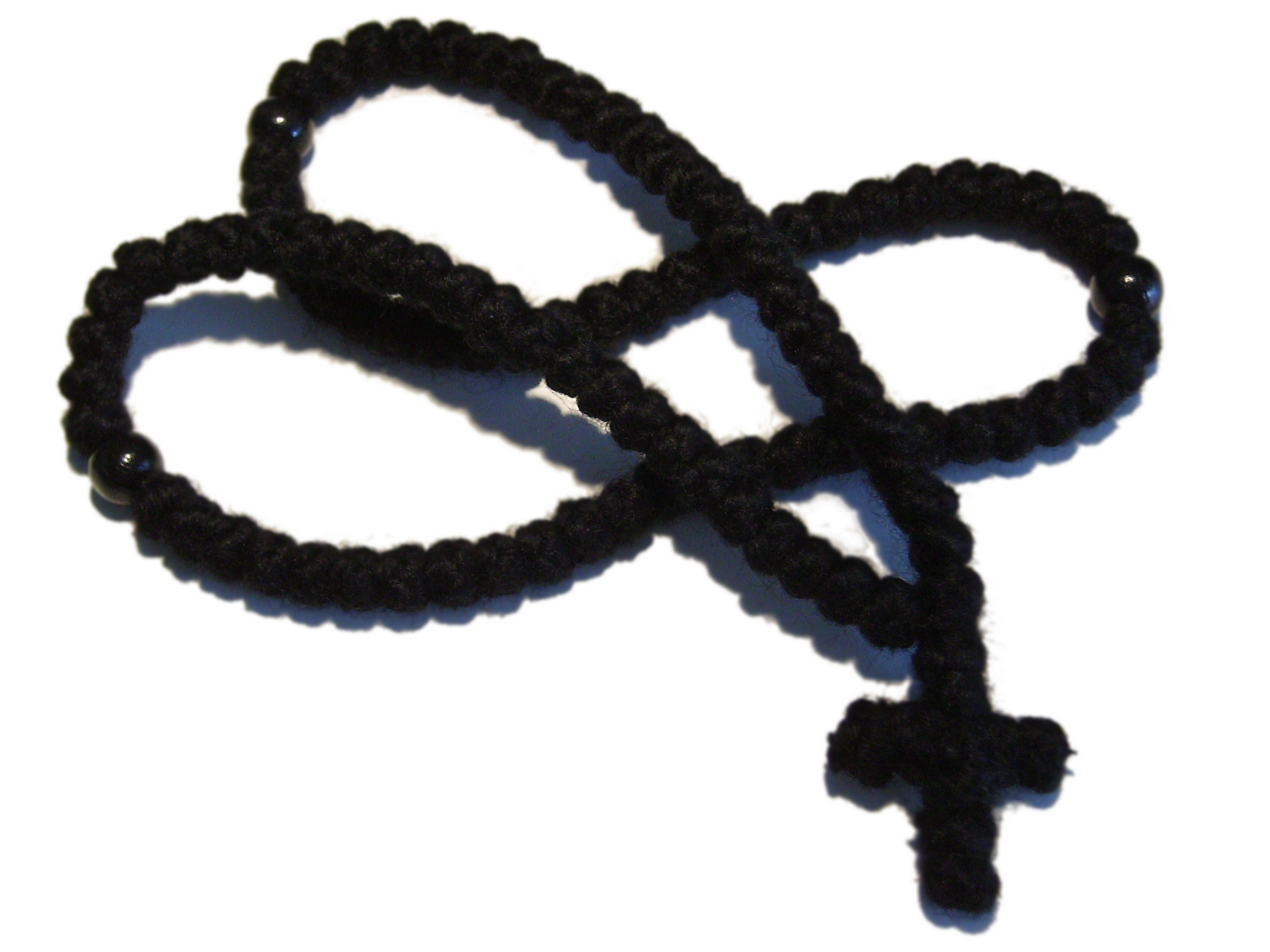
Eastern Christian prayer rope

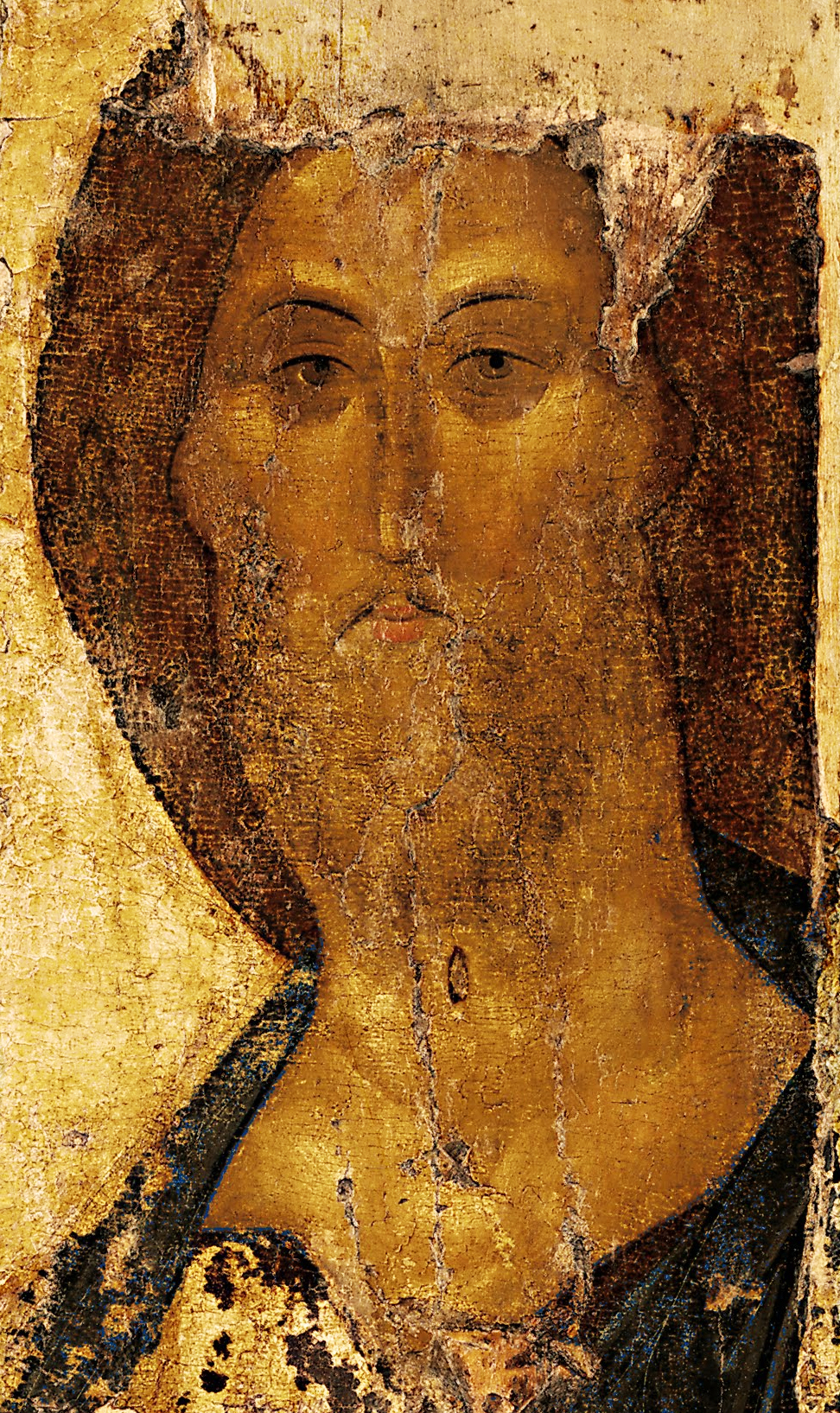
Christ the Redeemer by Andrei Rublev (c. 1410, Tretyakov Gallery, Moscow)

=== Levels of the prayer ===
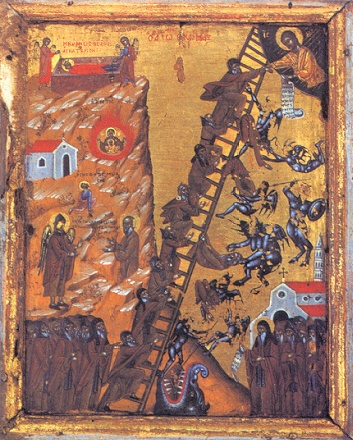
Icon of The Ladder of Divine Ascent (the steps toward theosis as described by John Climacus) showing monks ascending (and falling from) the ladder to Jesus

Paul Evdokimov, a 20th-century Russian philosopher and theologian, writes about beginner's way of praying: initially, the prayer is excited because the man is emotive and a flow of psychic contents is expressed. In his view this condition comes, for the modern men, from the separation of the mind from the heart: "The prattle spreads the soul, while the silence is drawing it together." Old fathers condemned elaborate phraseologies, for one word was enough for the publican, and one word saved the thief on the cross. They only uttered Jesus' name by which they were contemplating God. For Evdokimov the acting faith denies any formalism which quickly installs in the external prayer or in the life duties; he quotes Seraphim of Sarov: "The prayer is not thorough if the man is self-conscious and he is aware he's praying."

"Because prayer is a living reality, a deeply personal encounter with the living God, it is not to be confined to any given classification or rigid analysis", says the Greek Orthodox Archdiocese of America. As general guidelines for the practitioner, different number of levels (3, 7 or 9) in the practice of the prayer are distinguished by Orthodox fathers. They are to be seen as being purely informative, because the practice of the Prayer of the Heart is learned under personal spiritual guidance in Eastern Orthodoxy which emphasizes the perils of temptations when it is done on one's own. Thus, Theophan the Recluse, a 19th-century Russian spiritual writer, talks about three stages:

1. The oral prayer (the prayer of the lips) is a simple recitation, still external to the practitioner.
2. The focused prayer, when "the mind is focused upon the words" of the prayer, "speaking them as if they were our own".
3. The prayer of the heart itself, when the prayer is no longer something we do but who we are.

Once this is achieved the Jesus Prayer is said to become "self-active" (αυτενεργούμενη). It is repeated automatically and unconsciously by the mind, becoming an internal habit like a (beneficial) earworm. Body, through the uttering of the prayer, mind, through the mental repetition of the prayer, are thus unified with "the heart" (spirit) and the prayer becomes constant, ceaselessly "playing" in the background of the mind, like a background music, without hindering the normal everyday activities of the person.

Others, like Father Archimandrite Ilie Cleopa, one of the most representative spiritual fathers of contemporary Romanian Orthodox monastic spirituality, talk about nine levels. They are the same path to theosis, more slenderly differentiated:

1. The prayer of the lips.
2. The prayer of the mouth.
3. The prayer of the tongue.
4. The prayer of the voice.
5. The prayer of the mind.
6. The prayer of the heart.
7. The active prayer.
8. The all-seeing prayer.
9. The contemplative prayer.

== Variants of repetitive formulas ==
A number of different repetitive prayer formulas have been attested in the history of Eastern Orthodox monasticism: the Prayer of St. Ioannikios the Great (754–846): "My hope is the Father, my refuge is the Son, my shelter is the Holy Spirit, O Holy Trinity, Glory unto You", the repetitive use of which is described in his Life; or the more recent practice of Nikolaj Velimirović.

Similarly to the flexibility of the practice of the Jesus Prayer, there is no imposed standardization of its form. The prayer can be from as short as "Lord, have mercy" (Kyrie eleison), "Have mercy on me" ("Have mercy upon us"), or even "Jesus", to its longer most common form. It can also contain a call to the Theotokos (Virgin Mary), or to the saints. The single essential and invariable element is Jesus' name.

- Lord Jesus Christ, Son of God, have mercy on me, a sinner. (a very common form)
- Lord Jesus Christ, Son of God, have mercy on me. (a very common form in the Greek tradition)
- Lord Jesus Christ, have mercy on me. (common variant on Mount Athos.)
- Jesus, have mercy.
- Lord Jesus Christ, Son of God, have mercy on us.
- Lord Jesus Christ, Son of the living God, have mercy on me, a sinner.

== Catholic Church ==
The Jesus Prayer is widely practiced among the 23 Eastern Catholic Churches.

Part four of the Catechism of the Catholic Church, which is dedicated to Christian prayer, devotes paragraphs 2665 to 2669 to prayer to Jesus.

To pray "Jesus" is to invoke him and to call him within us. His name is the only one that contains the presence it signifies. Jesus is the Risen One, and whoever invokes the name of Jesus is welcoming the Son of God who loved him and who gave himself up for him. This simple invocation of faith developed in the tradition of prayer under many forms in East and West. The most usual formulation, transmitted by the spiritual writers of the Sinai, Syria, and Mt. Athos, is the invocation, "Lord Jesus Christ, Son of God, have mercy on us sinners." It combines the Christological hymn of Philippians 2:6–11 with the cry of the publican and the blind men begging for light. By it the heart is opened to human wretchedness and the Savior's mercy. The invocation of the holy name of Jesus is the simplest way of praying always. When the holy name is repeated often by a humbly attentive heart, the prayer is not lost by heaping up empty phrases, but holds fast to the word and "brings forth fruit with patience." This prayer is possible "at all times" because it is not one occupation among others but the only occupation: that of loving God, which animates and transfigures every action in Christ Jesus.

Similar methods of prayer in use in the Catholic Church are recitation, as recommended by John Cassian, of "O God, come to my assistance; O Lord, make haste to help me" or other verses of Scripture; repetition of a single monosyllabic word, as suggested by the Cloud of Unknowing; the method used in Centering Prayer; the method used by The World Community for Christian Meditation, based on the Aramaic invocation Maranatha; the use of Lectio Divina; etc.

The Catechism of the Catholic Church says:

The name of Jesus is at the heart of Christian prayer. All liturgical prayers conclude with the words "through our Lord Jesus Christ". The Hail Mary reaches its high point in the words "blessed is the fruit of thy womb, Jesus". The Eastern prayer of the heart, the Jesus Prayer, says: "Lord Jesus Christ, Son of God, have mercy on me, a sinner." Many Christians, such as Joan of Arc, have died with the one word "Jesus" on their lips. The most usual formulation, transmitted by the spiritual writers of the Sinai, Syria, and Mt. Athos, is the invocation: "Lord Jesus Christ, Son of God, have mercy on us sinners."

== Evangelical Lutheran Churches ==
In Evangelical Lutheranism, particularly in those Churches of the Eastern Lutheran tradition, the Jesus Prayer is prayed by the faithful. Evangelical-Lutheran theologian William Weedon, with regard to the Jesus Prayer, stated that "People loved by God, remember this beautiful, fitting addition to praying the Our Father in your personal prayers." The Lutheran Church of Australia notes:

The humble in heart pray. ‘Jesus Christ, Son of God, have mercy on me a poor sinner’. The prayer is prayed over and over in time with the beat of the heart, and it serves as a constant confession of our sin and a reminder that every heartbeat is dependent on the mercy and grace of Jesus Christ, Lord of the living and the dead.

== See also ==
- Cardiognosis
- Catholic prayers to Jesus
- Christian prayer
- Fatima Prayer
- High Priestly Prayer
- Imiaslavie
- Japa
- Poustinia
- Prayer beads
- Rosary
- Sacred heart
- Tabor Light
