= August 13 (Eastern Orthodox liturgics) =

Day in the Eastern Orthodox liturgical calendar

Eastern Orthodox liturgical calendar
August 12	August 13	August 14
August 13 O.S. ≍ August 26 N.S. August 13 N.S ≍ July 31 O.S.

An Eastern Orthodox cross

August 13 in Eastern Orthodox liturgical calendars is a feast day and a day of commemoration of saints and martyrs. Although some Orthodox churches use the Revised Julian Calendar and others use the traditional Julian calendar, the fixed commemorations for their respective August 13 are broadly the same, no matter which calendar is used. (Note: Despite the dates being the same, the days to which they refer typically differ by 13 days. The notation Old Style or O.S. is sometimes used to indicate a date in the traditional Julian Calendar (the "Old Calendar"). The notation New Style or N.S. indicates a date in the Revised Julian calendar (the "New Calendar").)

== Feasts ==
- Apodosis of the Transfiguration of Our Lord, God, and Savior Jesus Christ. (Note: On the Leavetaking of the Transfiguration, all of the service for the Feast is repeated, except for the Entrance at Vespers, the Old Testament readings, Litya, the Polyeleos and Gospel at Matins, and the blessing of grapes at Liturgy. The Gospel and Epistle readings at Liturgy are those prescribed for the day. The Typikon should be consulted for any possible variations.)

== Saints ==
- Martyr Hippolytus of Rome, and 18 martyrs with him (258), including: (Note: "AT Rome, blessed Hippolytus, martyr, who gloriously confessed the faith, under the emperor Valerian. After enduring other torments, he was tied by the feet to the necks of wild horses, and being cruelly dragged through briars and brambles, and having all his body lacerated, he yielded up his spirit. On the same day, suffered also blessed Concordia, his nurse, who being scourged in his presence with leaded whips, went to our Lord; and nineteen others of his house, who were beheaded beyond the Tiburtine gate, and buried with him in the Veran field.") (Note: HIPPOLYTUS, CONCORDIA and OTHERS (SS.) MM. (Aug. 13). "The Roman tradition, set forth in the Breviary Lections and Martyrology, has it that this Saint Hippolytus was a Roman baptised by St. Laurence. Tried thereupon for his life before the Emperor Valerian (a.d. 254 - a.d. 259) in person, he was sentenced to be torn in pieces by wild horses as in the myth was his namesake, the son of Theseus. After St. Hippolytus, suffered his old nurse Concordia and nineteen other Christians, who were beheaded outside the Porta Tiburtina (Tivoli Gate) of Rome and buried together in the neighbouring Ager Veranus (now the Cemetery of San Lorenzo). Some moderns make of St. Hippolytus a priest of great age, a convert from Novatianism (Jan. 30); others confuse him with St. Hippolytus, Bishop of Porto (Aug. 22); but into these controversies it is not needful here to enter.") (Note: Hippolytus was born in Rome where he became a priest, known for his excessive strictness. He was exiled to Sardinia but was reconciled to the Church before his martyrdom. He is one of the most important Church writers of his time.) (see also January 30 - Hippolytus of Rome, Bishop of Rome - who may or may not be the same individual)

- Martyrs Concordia, Irenaeus and Abundius.

- Martyr Coronatus, by the sword.
- Saint Eudocia the Empress (460), wife of Theodosius the Younger, in Palestine.
- Venerable Seridus, Abbot, of Gaza (ca. 543)
- Venerable Abba Dorotheus of Gaza (560-580)
- Venerable Dositheos, attendant to Abba Dorotheus of Gaza (6th century)

== Pre-Schism Western saints ==
- Saint Pontian, Pope of Rome, was exiled by Emperor Maximinus Thrax to Sardinia in c 235, where he died from ill-treatment (235)
- Saint Cassian of Imola, a martyr who refused to worship idols and suffered a slow death in Imola in Italy (c. 250) (Note: "At Imola, the birthday of St. Cassian, martyr. As he refused to worship idols, the persecutor called the boys whom the saint taught and who hated him, giving them leave to kill him. The torment suffered by the martyr was the more grievous, as the hand which inflicted it, by reason of its weakness, rendered death more tardy.")
- Saints Centolla and Helen, two virgin-martyrs near Burgos in Spain (c. 304)
- Saint Cassian of Todi, Bishop of Todi, martyred under Maximian Herculeus (4th century)
- Saint Junian of Mairé, founder of the monastery of Mairé in Poitou in France and later a hermit in Chaulnay (587)
- Saint Radegunde of Poitiers, nun (587) (Note: Daughter of a pagan, she was married by force to the Frankish King Clotaire I. However, she became a nun and founded the convent of the Holy Cross at Poitiers in France where she spent the last thirty years of her life.) (Note: "At Poitiers, St. Radegundes, queen, whose life was renowned for miracles and virtues.")
- Saint Muredach (Murtagh, Muiredach), first Bishop of Killala and founder of Innismurray (6th century) (see also August 12)
- Saint Wigbert, Abbot of Hersfeld, and English missionary to Germany, Confessor (c. 747) (Note: Born in England, he became a monk and went to Germany. St. Boniface appointed him Abbot of Fritzlar and a few years later he Abbot of Ohrdruf in Thuringia.)
- Saint Herulph, a monk at St Gall in Switzerland, then founded the monastery of Ellwangen (764) near Augsberg in Germany, later became Bishop of Langres in France (785)
- Saint Ludolf, Abbot of New Corvey (Nova Corbeia) in Westphalia in Germany from 971 to 983 (983)

== Post-Schism Orthodox saints ==
- Empress Irene (tonsured Xenia), wife of Emperor John II Comnenus (1134)
- Saint Tikhon of Zadonsk, Bishop of Voronezh, Wonderworker of Zadonsk (1783)

=== New martyrs and confessors ===
- New Hieromartyrs John Shyshev, Ioasph Panov and Constantine Popov, Priests (1918)
- New Hieromartyr Benjamin of Petrograd, Metropolitan, and those with him (1921)
- New Hieromartyrs Sergius, Archimandrite, and those with him (1921)
- New Hieromartyr Seraphim (Zvezdinsky), Bishop of Dmitrov (1937)
- New Hieromartyrs Nicholas Orlov and Jacob Arkhippov, Priests, and Alexis Vedensky, Deacon, of Yarsoslavl-Rostov (1937)
- New Martyr Basil Aleksandrin (1942)

== Other commemorations ==
- Translation of the relics (c. 681) of Venerable Maximus the Confessor (662) (Note: In the Greek Prologue, August 13 commemorates the Transfer of the Relics of St Maximus from Lazika on the southeast shore of the Black Sea to Constantinople, to the Monastery of the Theotokos at Chrysopolis (where he had been the Igumen), across the Bosphoros from Constantinople. This transfer took place after the Sixth Ecumenical Council. August 13 could also be the date of the saint’s death, however. It is possible that his main commemoration was moved to January 21 because August 13 is the Leavetaking of the Feast of the Transfiguration of the Lord.) (Note: "At Constantinople, St. Maximus, a monk, distinguished for learning and for zeal for Catholic truth. Combating valiantly the Monothelites, he had his hands and tongue torn from him by the heretical emperor Constans, and was banished to Chersonesus, where he breathed his last. At this time, two of his disciples, both called Anastasius, and many others endured diverse torments and the hardships of exile.")
- Uncovering of the relics (1547) of St. Maximus of Moscow, Fool-for-Christ (1433)
- Icons of the Most Holy Theotokos:

- "Of Minsk" (1500)
- "Of the Passion" (1641) (Note: This icon is perhaps the most popular icon of the Mother of God of all time and in both East and West. The tradition behind it is that when the Archangels St Michael and St Gabriel one day appeared to the Child Jesus holding the instruments of the Lord’s future Passion, He became frightened and ran to His Mother – jumping up onto her arms so quickly that one of his sandals became loosened. As the Child Jesus clutches His Mother’s outstretched hand (by which she indicates to us the Divine Saviour of the world), her eyes continue to "ponder all these things in her heart.")
- "Of the Seven Arrows" (Vologda) / "The Softener of Evil Hearts" (1830) (Note: Feast of the icons of the "Seven Arrows" and that of the "Softening of Evil Hearts." Both of these icons represent the Mother of God with seven arrows piercing her soul/heart in fulfillment of St Simeon’s prophecy at the time of the Meeting of the Lord that "an arrow shall pierce your heart so that the thoughts of many may be laid bare.")

- Repose of Valaam Schema-monk Timothy of Mount Athos (1848)

== Icon gallery ==
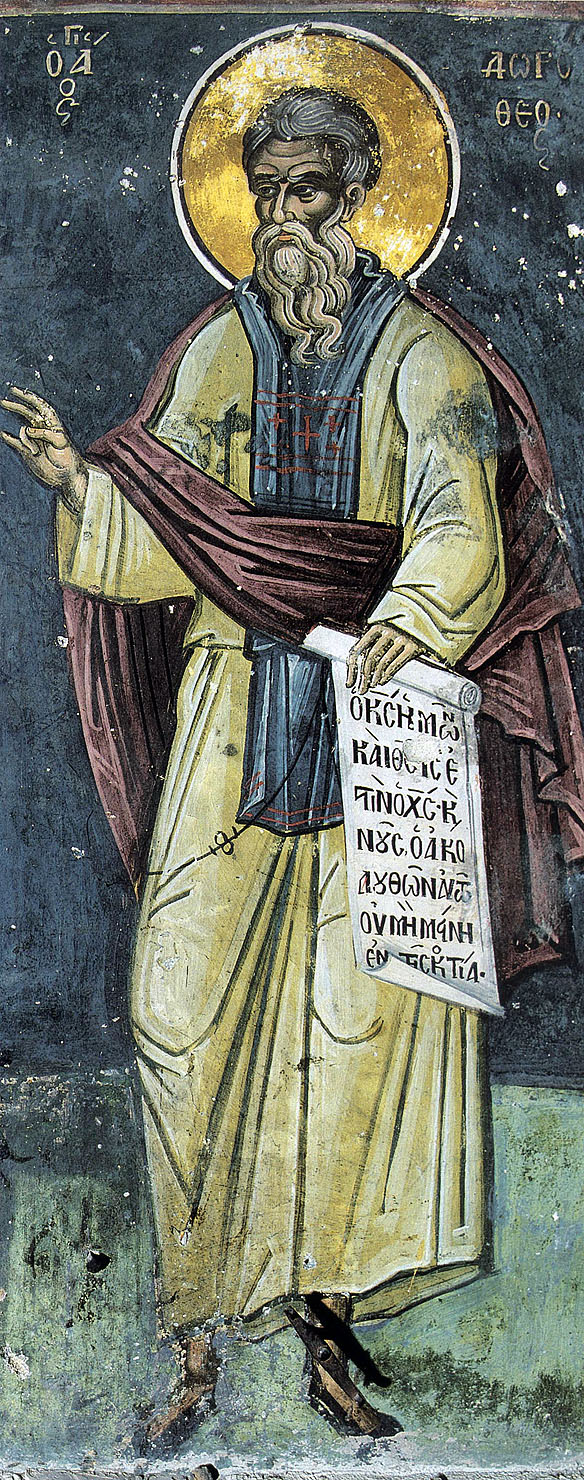
St. Dorotheus of Gaza.

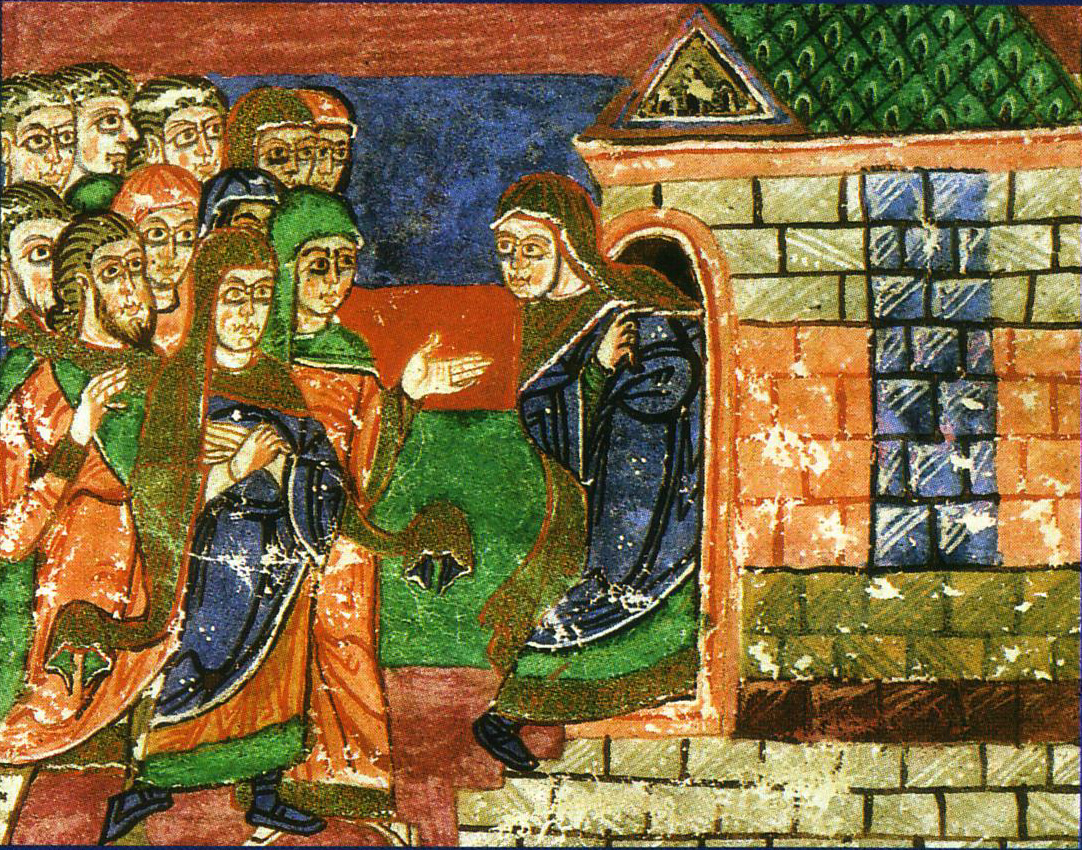
Saint Radegunde of Poitiers, nun.

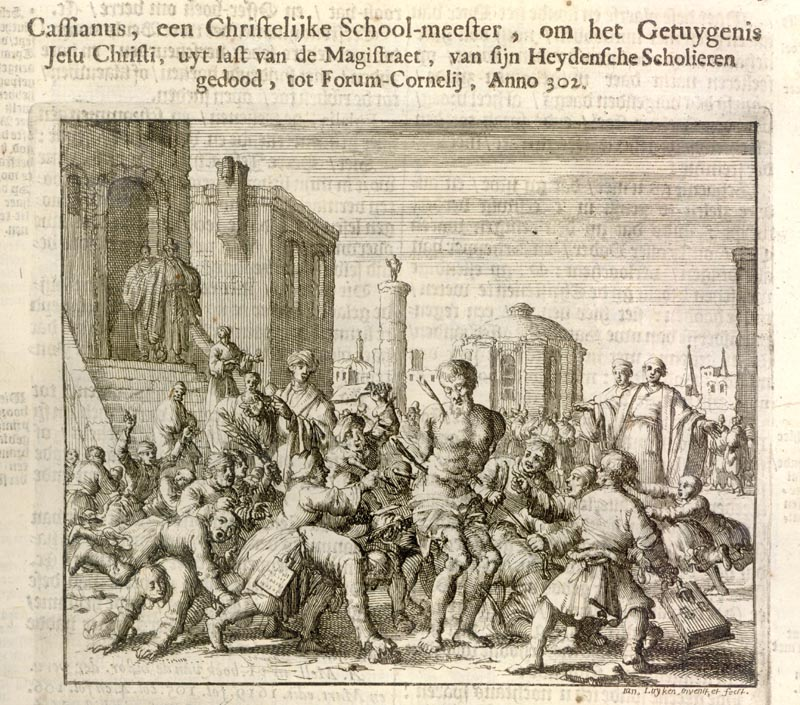
martyrdom of Cassian of Imola.

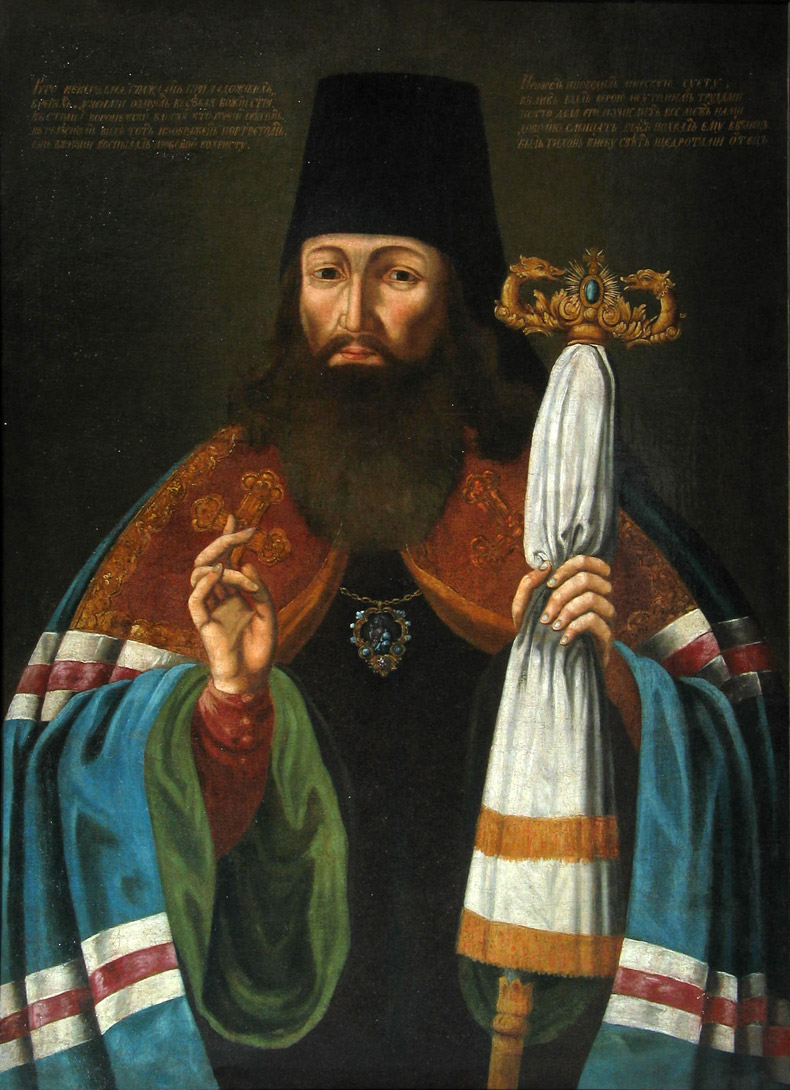
St. Tikhon of Zadonsk.

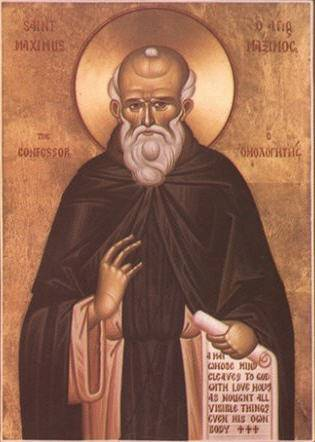
St. Maximus the Confessor.

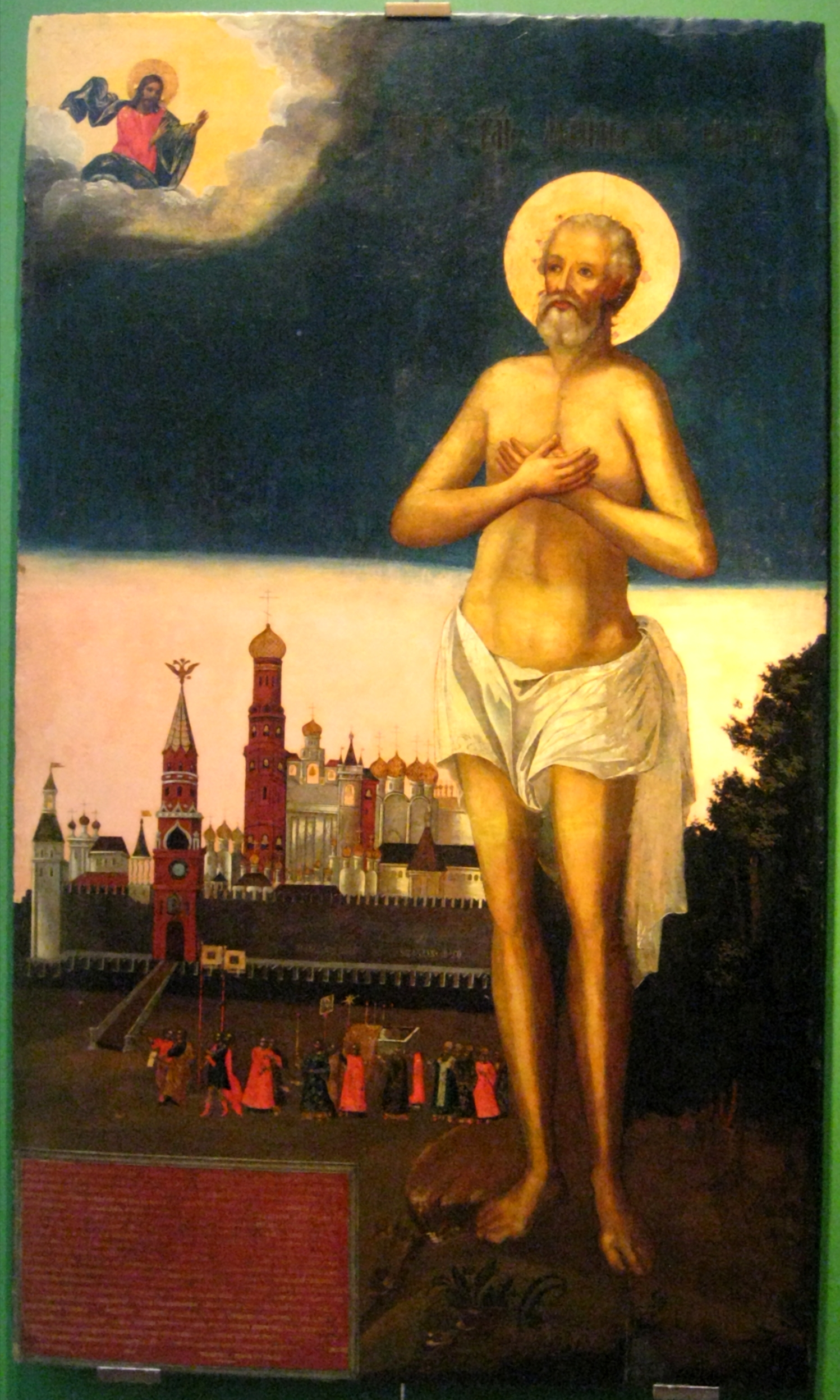
St. Maximus of Moscow, Fool-for-Christ.

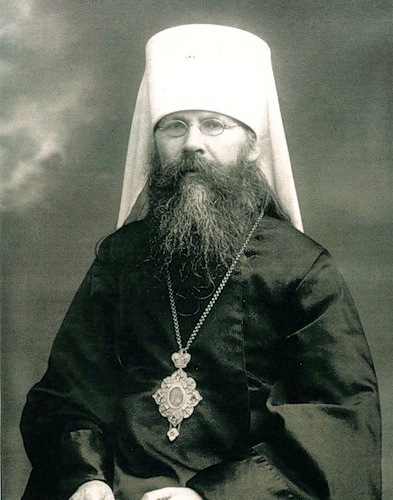
New Hieromartyr Benjamin of Petrograd.

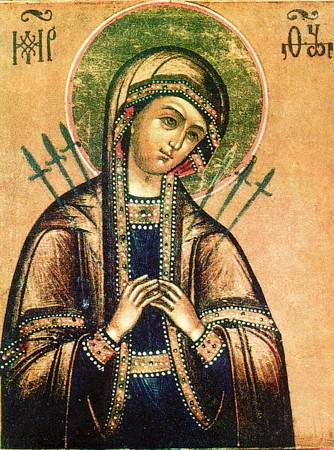
Icon of the Most Holy Theotokos "The Softener of Evil Hearts".

== Sources ==
- August 13 / August 26. Orthodox Calendar (PRAVOSLAVIE.RU).
- August 26 / August 13. HOLY TRINITY RUSSIAN ORTHODOX CHURCH (A parish of the Patriarchate of Moscow).
- August 13. OCA - The Lives of the Saints.
- The Autonomous Orthodox Metropolia of Western Europe and the Americas (ROCOR). St. Hilarion Calendar of Saints for the year of our Lord 2004. St. Hilarion Press (Austin, TX). p. 59.
- Menologion: The Thirteenth Day of the Month of August. Orthodoxy in China.
- August 13. Latin Saints of the Orthodox Patriarchate of Rome.
- The Roman Martyrology. Transl. by the Archbishop of Baltimore. Last Edition, According to the Copy Printed at Rome in 1914. Revised Edition, with the Imprimatur of His Eminence Cardinal Gibbons. Baltimore: John Murphy Company, 1916. pp. 242-243.
- Rev. Richard Stanton. A Menology of England and Wales, or, Brief Memorials of the Ancient British and English Saints Arranged According to the Calendar, Together with the Martyrs of the 16th and 17th Centuries. London: Burns & Oates, 1892. pp. 391-393.

Greek Sources

- Great Synaxaristes: (in Greek) 13 ΑΥΓΟΥΣΤΟΥ. ΜΕΓΑΣ ΣΥΝΑΞΑΡΙΣΤΗΣ.
- (in Greek) Συναξαριστής. 13 Αυγούστου. ECCLESIA.GR. (H ΕΚΚΛΗΣΙΑ ΤΗΣ ΕΛΛΑΔΟΣ).

Russian Sources

- (in Russian) 26 августа (13 августа). Православная Энциклопедия под редакцией Патриарха Московского и всея Руси Кирилла (электронная версия). (Orthodox Encyclopedia - Pravenc.ru).
