= August 12 (Eastern Orthodox liturgics) =

Day in the Eastern Orthodox liturgical calendar

Eastern Orthodox liturgical calendar
August 11	August 12	August 13
August 12 O.S. ≍ August 25 N.S. August 12 N.S ≍ July 30 O.S.

An Eastern Orthodox cross

August 12 in Eastern Orthodox liturgical calendars is a feast day and a day of commemoration of saints and martyrs. Although some Orthodox churches use the Revised Julian Calendar and others use the traditional Julian calendar, the fixed commemorations for their respective August 12 are broadly the same, no matter which calendar is used. (Note: Despite the dates being the same, the days to which they refer typically differ by 13 days. The notation Old Style or O.S. is sometimes used to indicate a date in the traditional Julian Calendar (the "Old Calendar"). The notation New Style or N.S. indicates a date in the Revised Julian calendar (the "New Calendar").)

== Feasts ==
- Afterfeast of the Transfiguration of Our Lord, God, and Savior Jesus Christ. (Note: Today’s hymns speak of how Christ made those who ascended Mt Tabor with Him "partakers of (His) otherworldly glory." The Apostles, "overcome with fear, fell headlong upon the earth.")

== Saints ==
- Hieromartyr Alexander of Comana, Bishop of Comana (3rd century)
- Martyrs Pamphilus and Capito, by the sword (3rd century)
- Martyrs Anicetus and Photius, and others, of Nicomedia (288)
- Holy 12 soldier-martyrs of Crete, by the sword.
- Venerable Pallamon of Egypt (c. 323), instructor of St. Pachomius the Great.
- Venerable Saints Sergius and Stephen, peacefully.
- Venerable Castor, peacefully.

== Pre-Schism Western saints ==
- Martyrs Hilaria, Digna, Euprepia, Eunomia, Quiriacus, Largio, Crescentian, Nimmia, Juliana and Companions (c. 304) (Note: Hilaria was by tradition the mother of St Afra of Augsburg in Germany. She and her three maids were seized while visiting the tomb of St Afra and burnt alive. The others (Quiriacus etc, twenty-five in all) were martyrs in Rome buried on the Ostian Way.) (Note: "At Augsburg, St. Hilaria, mother of the blessed martyr Afra. Because she watched at the sepulchre of her daughter, she was cast into the fire for the faith of Christ, together with her maid-servants Digna, Euprepia, and Eunomia. On the same day there suffered also in that city Quiriacus, Largius, Crescentian, Nimmia, and Juliana, with twenty others.")
- Saint Euplus of Catania (304)) (Note: "At Catania, in Sicily, the birthday of St. Euplius, deacon, under the emperors Diocletian and Maximian. He was a long time tortured for the confession of the Lord, and finally obtained the palm of martyrdom by being put to the sword.") (see also: August 11)
- Saint Gracilian and Felicissima (c. 304) (Note: While in prison awaiting martyrdom, Gracilian, from Faleria in Tuscany in Italy, restored the sight of the blind girl Felicissima and converted her to Christ. They were beheaded on the same day.) (Note: "At Faleria, in Tuscany, the Saints Gracilian, and Felicissima, virgin, who, for the confession of the faith, had their mouths bruised with stones, and being afterwards struck with the sword, received the palm of martyrdom.")
- Saint Cassian of Benevento, Bishop of Benevento (c. 340)
- Saint Eusebius of Milan, a Greek by birth, was Bishop of Milan in Italy for sixteen years, he opposed Eutychianism (465)
- Saint Herculanus of Brescia, Bishop of Brescia in Italy (c. 550)
- Saint Molaise of Devenish (Laisrén mac Nad Froích) (563)
- Saint Muredach (Murtagh, Muiredach), first Bishop of Killala and founder of Innismurray (6th century)
- Saint Seigine (Ségéne mac Fiachnaí), Abbot of Iona (652)
- Saint Porcarius, Abbot of Lérins, and 500 Companions, massacred by the Saracens (c. 732) (Note: "The same day, the holy martyrs Porcarius, abbot of the monastery of Lerins, and five hundred monks, who were slain for the Catholic faith by barbarians, and were thus crowned with martyrdom.")
- Saint Jambert (Jænberht, Janbert), fourteenth Archbishop of Canterbury (792)
- Saint Merewenna (Marwenne, Morwenna), the local saint of Marhamchurch near Bude in Cornwall.
- Saint Ust (Justus). The town of St Just, a few miles from Penzance in Cornwall, is named after this hermit.

== Post-Schism Orthodox saints ==
- New Hieromartyrs of David Gareja Monastery, slain by the Dagestanis (Lekians) (1851):

- Gerontius and Serapion (hieromonks); Otar (deacon); Monk-martyrs Germanus, Bessarion, and Michael, and New Martyr Symeon.

=== New martyrs and confessors ===
- New Hieromartyrs of the Belogorsk St. Nicholas Monastery (Perm) (1918-1919):

- Barlaam (Konoplev), Archimandrite,
- Anthony (Arapov), Abbot,
- Sergius (Vershinin), Elijah (Popov), Vyacheslav (Kosozhilin), Ioasaph (Sabintsev), and John (Novoselov), Hieromonks;
- Micah (Podkorytov), Bessarion (Okulov), Euthymius (Korotkov), and Matthew (Bannikov), Hierodeacons;
- New Monk-martyrs: Euthymius, Barnabas, Demetrius, Sabbas, Hermogenes, Arcadius, and Marcellus;
- Martyred novices: John, Jacob, Peter, Jacob, Alexander, Theodore, Peter, Sergius, and Alexis.

- New Hieromartyr Basil Infantiev, Priest (1918)
- New Hieromartyrs Leonidas Biryukovich, John Nikolsky, and Nicholas Dobroumov, Priests (1937)
- New Martyr Eudocia Safronova (1938)

== Other commemorations ==
- Translation of relics of St. Eadwold of Cerne (Edwold) (c. 900), hermit of Cerne.

== Icon gallery ==
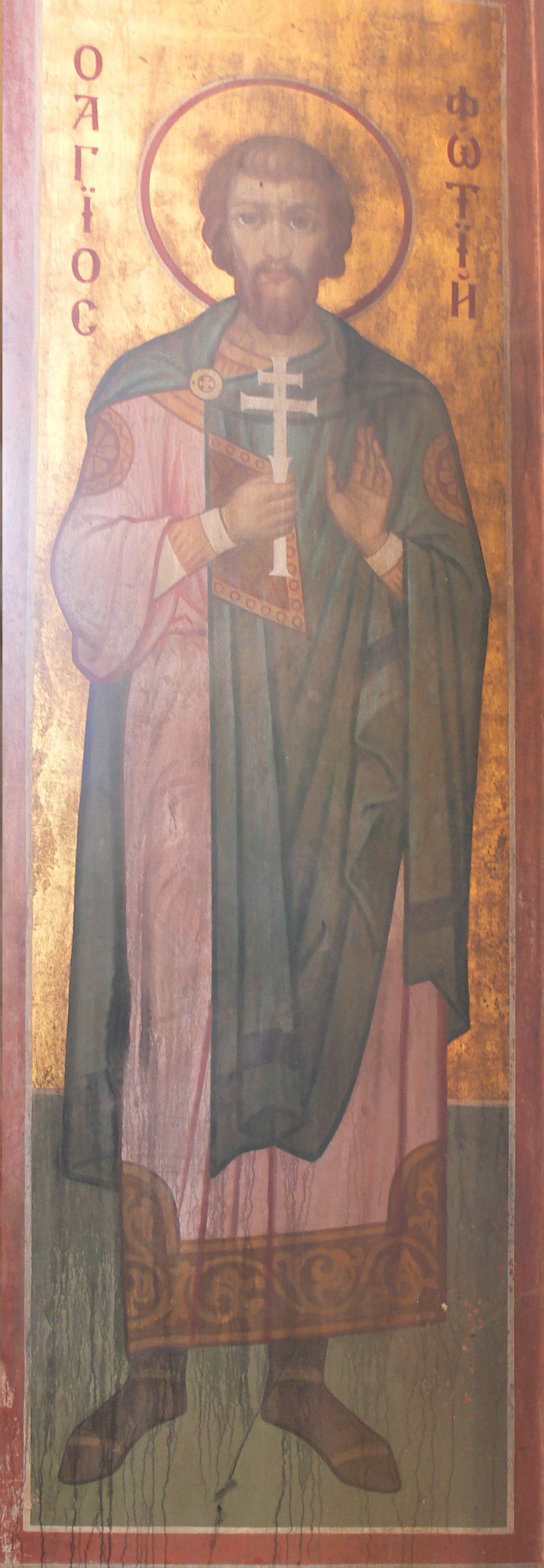
Saint Photius the Martyr

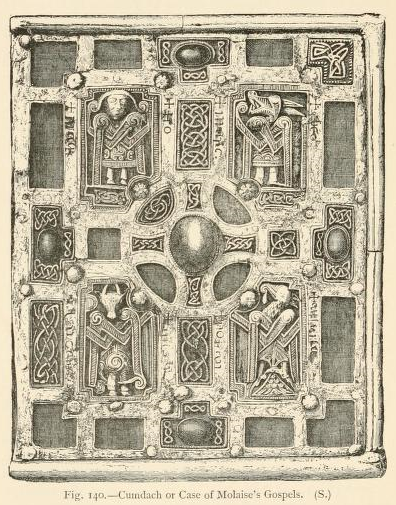
Cover from the Soiscél Molaisse

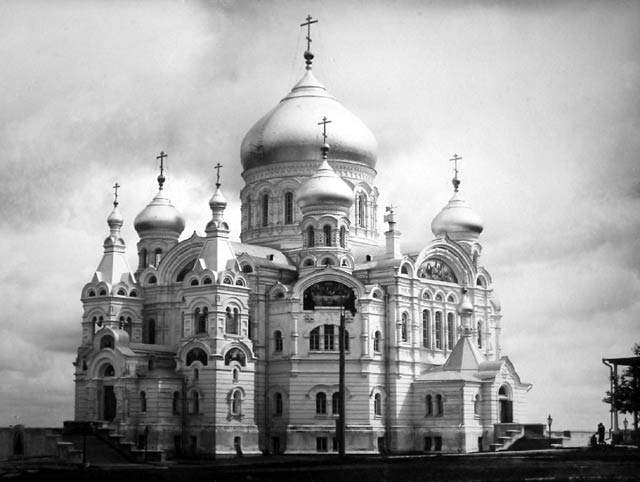
Belogorsk St. Nicholas Monastery (Perm), in 1917

== Sources ==
- August 12 / August 25. Orthodox Calendar (PRAVOSLAVIE.RU).
- August 25 / August 12. HOLY TRINITY RUSSIAN ORTHODOX CHURCH (A parish of the Patriarchate of Moscow).
- August 12. OCA - The Lives of the Saints.
- The Autonomous Orthodox Metropolia of Western Europe and the Americas (ROCOR). St. Hilarion Calendar of Saints for the year of our Lord 2004. St. Hilarion Press (Austin, TX). p. 59.
- Menologion: The Twelfth Day of the Month of August. Orthodoxy in China.
- August 12. Latin Saints of the Orthodox Patriarchate of Rome.
- The Roman Martyrology. Transl. by the Archbishop of Baltimore. Last Edition, According to the Copy Printed at Rome in 1914. Revised Edition, with the Imprimatur of His Eminence Cardinal Gibbons. Baltimore: John Murphy Company, 1916. pp. 240-241.
- Rev. Richard Stanton. A Menology of England and Wales, or, Brief Memorials of the Ancient British and English Saints Arranged According to the Calendar, Together with the Martyrs of the 16th and 17th Centuries. London: Burns & Oates, 1892. pp. 389-391.

Greek Sources

- Great Synaxaristes: (in Greek) 12 ΑΥΓΟΥΣΤΟΥ. ΜΕΓΑΣ ΣΥΝΑΞΑΡΙΣΤΗΣ.
- (in Greek) Συναξαριστής. 12 Αυγούστου. ECCLESIA.GR. (H ΕΚΚΛΗΣΙΑ ΤΗΣ ΕΛΛΑΔΟΣ).

Russian Sources

- (in Russian) 25 августа (12 августа). Православная Энциклопедия под редакцией Патриарха Московского и всея Руси Кирилла (электронная версия). (Orthodox Encyclopedia - Pravenc.ru).
