= 558 =

Calendar year

558 in various calendars
- Gregorian calendar: 558; DLVIII
- Ab urbe condita: 1311
- Armenian calendar: 7 ԹՎ Է
- Assyrian calendar: 5308
- Balinese saka calendar: 479–480
- Bengali calendar: −36 – −35
- Berber calendar: 1508
- Buddhist calendar: 1102
- Burmese calendar: −80
- Byzantine calendar: 6066–6067
- Chinese calendar: 丁丑年 (Fire Ox); 3255 or 3048 — to — 戊寅年 (Earth Tiger); 3256 or 3049
- Coptic calendar: 274–275
- Discordian calendar: 1724
- Ethiopian calendar: 550–551
- Hebrew calendar: 4318–4319
- Hindu calendars
- Vikram Samvat: 614–615
- Shaka Samvat: 479–480
- Kali Yuga: 3658–3659
- Holocene calendar: 10558
- Iranian calendar: 64 BP – 63 BP
- Islamic calendar: 66 BH – 65 BH
- Javanese calendar: 446–447
- Julian calendar: 558; DLVIII
- Korean calendar: 2891
- Minguo calendar: 1354 before ROC 民前1354年
- Nanakshahi calendar: −910
- Seleucid era: 869/870 AG
- Thai solar calendar: 1100–1101
- Tibetan calendar: མེ་མོ་གླང་ལོ་ (female Fire-Ox); 684 or 303 or −469 — to — ས་ཕོ་སྟག་ལོ་ (male Earth-Tiger); 685 or 304 or −468

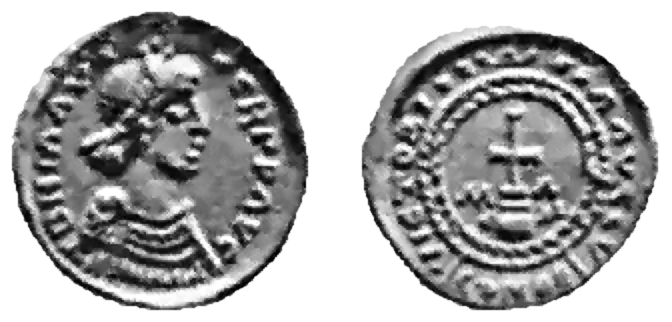
King Chlothar I (c. 497–561)

Year 558 (DLVIII) was a common year starting on Tuesday of the Julian calendar. The denomination 558 for this year has been used since the early medieval period, when the Anno Domini calendar era became the prevalent method in Europe for naming years.

== Events ==
=== By place ===
==== Byzantine Empire ====
- May 7 – In Constantinople, the dome of the Hagia Sophia collapses due to an earthquake. Emperor Justinian I orders the dome to be rebuilt.

==== Europe ====
- The Avars and the Slavs occupy the Hungarian Plain on the Balkans. The threat of Avar domination prompts the Lombards to migrate to Italy.
- December 13 – King Chlothar I reunites the Frankish Kingdom after his brother Childebert I dies, becoming sole ruler of the Franks.
- December 23 - Chlothar I is crowned King of the Franks.
- Conall mac Comgaill becomes king of Dál Riata, a Gaelic overkingdom on the western coast of Scotland.

==== Asia ====
- Istämi, ruler of the Western Turkic Khaganate, establishes diplomatic relations with the Byzantine Empire.

=== By topic ===
==== Religion ====
- December 23 – The Abbey of Saint-Germain-des-Prés is dedicated by Germain, bishop of Paris.
- The Bangor Abbey is founded by the Irish abbot Comgall in Northern Ireland (approximate date).

== Births ==
- Gao Yan, prince of Northern Qi (d. 571)
- Yu Shinan, calligrapher and official (d. 638)

== Deaths ==
- May 1 – Marcouf, missionary and saint
- May 13 – John the Silent, bishop and saint
- May 15 – Hilary of Galeata, Christian monk
- December 13 – Childebert I, king of the Franks
- Abraham of Kratia, Christian monk (approximate date)
- Empress Dugu, Northern Zhou consort
- Gabrán mac Domangairt, king of Dál Riata
- Jing Di, emperor of the Liang Dynasty (b. 543)
