= Dositheus of Gaza =

6th century Greek monk and saint

Dositheus of Gaza was a sixth century monk and saint. Originally a page, he entered the monastery of Seridus close to Gaza where he became a disciple of Dorotheus of Gaza and died due to a severe illness at a young age. Dositheus is considered a saint in several Christian churches and became a model for monastic life.

== Biography ==
Dositheus was originally a page to a general, who led a frivolous and wild life. At some point he travelled with some companions to Jerusalem, where he had a religious conversion to Christianity on Golgotha (according to others in Gethsemane) after having a vision of the Virgin Mary. After that, he took up fasting, ate no meat and prayed, upon which his soldiers recommended him to go enter a monastery.

Probably still a teenager, he presented himself at the monastery of Seridus close to Gaza, still in his uniform. Abbot Seridus placed him under the supervision of Dorotheus, who was one of the aspiring monks of the monastery and also acting as the monastery's medic due to his former studies. Dositheus struggled to adapt to the monastic life and Dorotheus was criticised by his fellow monks for the laxness of his disciple. Over time, Dositheus became known for his humility, self-denial and gentle and supportive ways with the sick. He soon started working at the infirmary of the hospital where he contracted tuberculosis less than five years after the entry to the monastery. Over time, his suffering become worse and he had to reduce his prayer life, whereupon Dorotheus suggested to him to remember God and think of God at his side.

Dositheus died after asking for the forgivness of his sins to Barsanuphius and receiving the blessing of the elder. After he died, Dorotheus said that Dositheus had surpassed the rest (of his disciples) in virtue without the practice of any extraordinary austerity and Barsanuphius declared that he had seen Dositheus among the saints in heaven.

== Sources ==
The primary source for Dositheus is the Life of Dositheus, which was written likely by another disciple of Dorotheus. Central to this short biography is the ideal of obedience as an essential component of the spiritual path, which serves the goal of becoming a "true disciple of Christ" and resemble "the Son of God", and Dositheus becomes a model for monastic obedience. The Life also provides insights into the monastic diet common in the region of Gaza as well as common practices in the monastery of Seridus. The Life of Dositheus also contains an early form of the Jesus prayer, which Dorotheus suggests Dositheus to pray in unceasing remembrance of God. Three letters in the correspondence of Barsanuphius and John are addressed to Dorotheus.

== Veneration ==
Dositheus is the patron saint of respiratory diseases. The Orthodox Church celebrates his feast day on August 13 in the Greek calendar and on February 19 in the Slavic. He is considered a model monk and his example is upheld especially in the Orthodox monastic world.

== Bibliography ==
- Bitton-Ashkelony, Brouria; Kofsky, Aryeh (February 2006). The Monastic School of Gaza. Brill. pp. 36–42. ISBN 9789047408444.
- Champion, Michael W. (2022). Dorotheus of Gaza and Ascetic Education. Oxford University Press. ISBN 978-0-19-886926-9.
- Wheeler, Eric P., ed. (1977). "Dorotheos of Gaza - Discourses and Sayings". Cistercian Studies. 33. Liturgical Press.
- "Venerable Dositheus of Palestine, disciple of Venerable Abba Dorotheus". www.oca.org. The Orthodox Church in America.
