= Belogorsky Monastery =

Priory in Perm Krai, Russia

Coordinates: 57°23′31″N 56°13′48″E

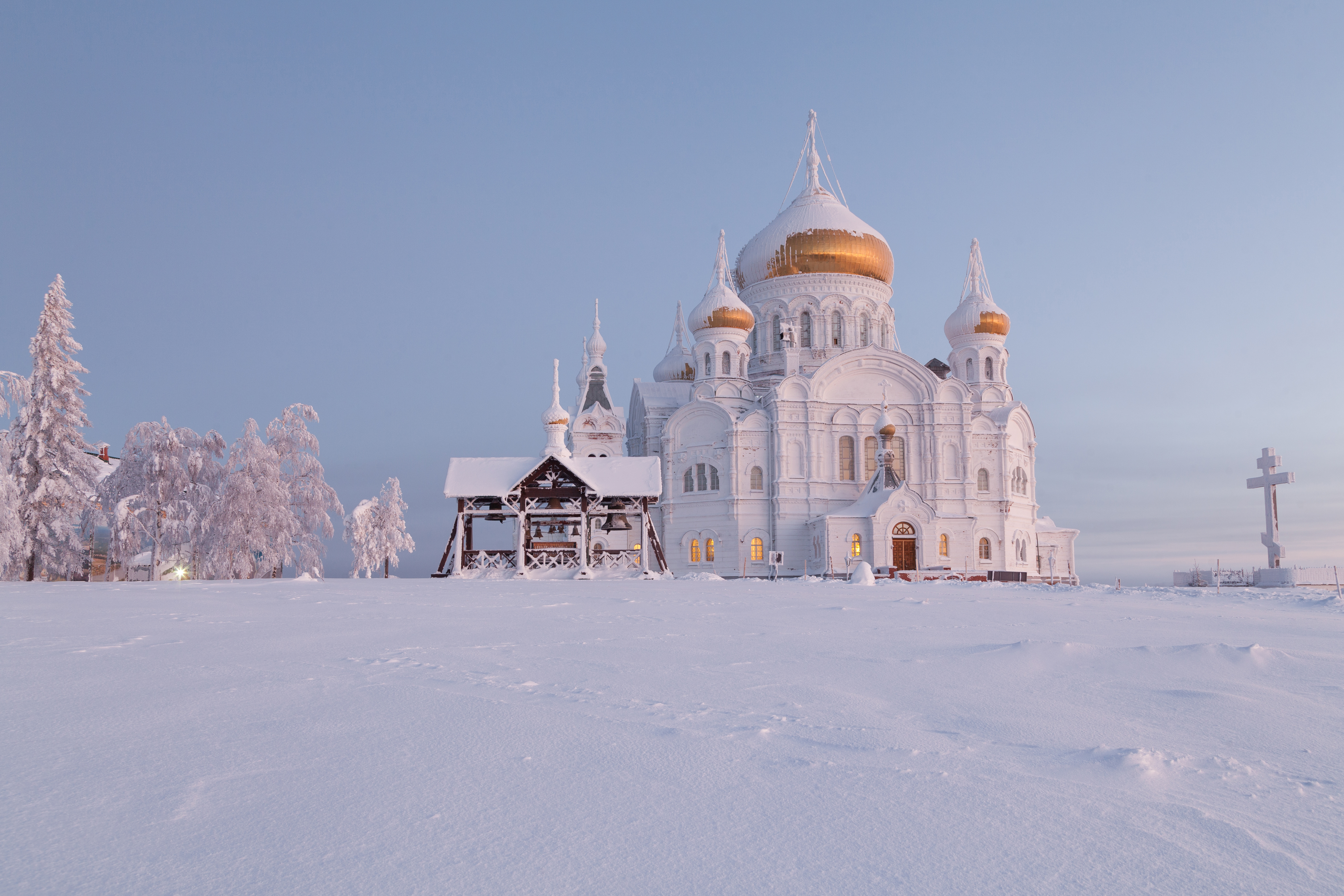
The Holy Cross Cathedral on Christmas 2016

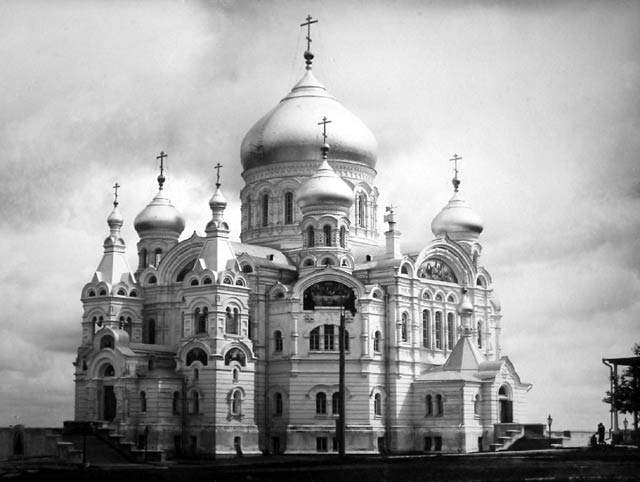
The Holy Cross Cathedral in 1917

Belogorsky Convent (Russian: Белогорский Николаевский монастырь) is a priory in Perm Krai, Russia. Located 85 km south of Perm and 50 km from Kungur, on Belaya Gora (White Mountain).

== History ==
Construction of the first wooden church on this site was completed in February 1894. It was opened as a school for orphaned boys.

On September 16, 1897, a procession from Moscow and St. Petersburg delivered five holy icons. On November 16, 1897, the wooden church burnt down. Construction on the new two-story stone church began in June 1902, but it was only opened in 1917. Tragic events came to the monastery in 1918, as on August 12 of that year, the Bolsheviks tortured and threw the monastery's Archimandrite Varlaam into the Kama River. From August 1918 to January 1919, the Bolsheviks executed and tortured 34 monks from the monastery. In March 1923, the monastery was completely closed down.

During Soviet times, the monastery was used as a nursing home for invalids. Reconstruction of the monastery began in the late 1980s.

=== Revival of the monastery ===
The beginning of the monastery revival is considered to be 1988-1989 when the 1000th anniversary of the Baptism of Russia was celebrated. In 1993, a restoration project was developed for the Cathedral of the Exaltation of the Cross and the whole Belogorsky Monastery. Between 1999 and 2002, 120 million rubles were spent on the restoration. In 2006, about 60 million rubles were allocated for this purpose from the Perm Krai budget, and 18 million rubles in 2007.

In May 1996, Patriarch Alexis II of Moscow visited the monastery.

== Sources ==
- Сойкин П. П. Белогорский Свято-Николаевский монастырь в Осинском уезде // Православные русские обители = «Православные русские обители»: Полное иллюстрированное описание православных русских монастырей в Российской Империи и на Афоне., Книгоизд-во П. П. Сойкина, 1909. — СПб.: Воскресение, 1994. — С. 161-162. — 712 с. — 20000 экз. — ISBN 5-88335-001-1
