= Dorotheus of Gaza =

6th century Greek monk, writer and saint

Saint Dorotheus of Gaza
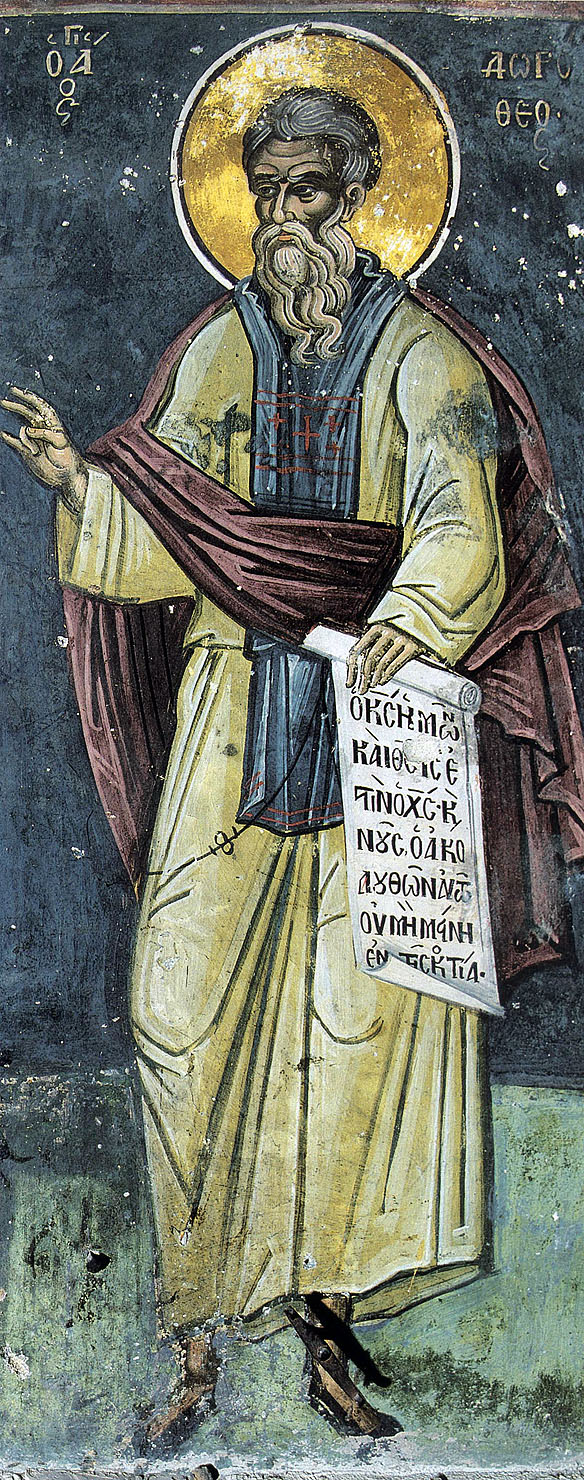
- Icon of St. Dorotheus of Gaza, from Monastery of Saint Dionysius, Mount Athos, 1547

Monk and Abbot
- Born: c. 500; Antioch, Roman Syria
- Died: c. 560 or 580; Monastery of Dorotheus, close to Gaza
- Venerated in: Roman Catholic Church; Eastern Orthodox Church; Oriental Orthodox Churches
- Feast: Eastern Orthodox Church: 5 June; 18 June; 13 August; 16 September; Catholic Church: 5 June
- Influences: Barsanuphius, John the Prophet, Seridus of Gaza
- Influenced: Theodore the Studite, Armand Jean le Bouthillier de Rancé

Dorotheus of Gaza (Ancient Greek: Δωρόθεος τῆς Γάζης Dorotheos tes Gazes; c. 500 – 560 or 580), Dorotheus the Archimandrite or Abba Dorotheus, was a Christian monk and abbot. He lived as a monk at the monastery of Seridus near Gaza and wrote instructions on the ascetic life that influenced both Eastern and Western monasticism.

== Life ==
=== Early life ===
Dorotheus was born at the beginning of the sixth century (possibly between 506–508) into a prosperous family in Antioch in Syria. His family was likely Christian and he was likely very close with his brother, who later became a benefactor of the monastic community Dorotheus was living in and possibly even a monk himself. Not much more is known from his childhood, though his Discourses and letters are scattered with many autobiographical details. His health was limited throughout his whole life and, as he got older, he suffered more serious illnesses. Dorotheus received from an early age onwards a classical education and he continued his studies at either Alexandria or, more likely, Gaza. Eric Wheeler suggests that he was taught by the sophist Procopius of Gaza, who Wheeler considers to be implicitly mentioned in the one of Dorotheus' Discourses. Next to rhetoric, he studied medicine and his later writings show him to be conversant in the medical theories of his day, as well as the use of medical terms and accurate descriptions of wound treatments.

=== Monastic life ===
At an unknown time, he entered the monastery of Seridus near Gaza. Contacts between the intellectual environment of Gaza, especially of the rhetorical school of Gaza, and the monastic communities around the city are well known and it is likely that this is how Dorotheus got to know the abbot of the monastery, Seridus, and the anchorites Barsanuphius and John the Prophet. Dorotheus entered the monastery in hope of a life of quiet contemplation and prayer and aspired to be an anchorite himself. However, he soon had to face several issues and the normal temptations when converting from a life in luxury to one of ascetic discipline. He had difficulties giving up his property, struggled with some of the ascetic practices and his relationship to his monk brothers was at times difficult. Abbot Seridus, recognising Dorotheus' talent and intelligence, gave him various responsibilities which Dorotheus rejected as he thought it would hinder him in his spiritual progression, but in the end he agreed to Seridus' wishes. Thus, he served first as porter and then as overseer of the xenodochium (guesthouse) before he was asked by Barsanuphius and John to establish and run a hospital in the monastery.

Dorotheus own brother, who had already proved himself a good friend and benefactor of the community, offered to provide the means for the building of the hospital. Many sick came to the hospital and Dorotheus, who always sought a more contemplative life, consulted Barsanuphius often about how to keep up his prayer life while managing the charges of head doctor at the infirmary. When Dorotheus doubted whether to restrict the methods of healing and not use the medical books he had brought with him to the monastery, Barsanuphius encouraged him to use the methods included in the books. According to the Life of Dositheus, Dorotheus was given several assistants, one of which was a young man named Dositheus, who would become the first disciple of Dorotheus and considered a saint himself.

Throughout Dorotheus life at the monastery, he was in close contact with the so-called Great Old Men, Barsanuphius and John, through the letters, the way they corresponded with other people. When the personal assistant to John fell ill, Dorotheus became the direct contact person between John and his petitioners, both in the monastic community and others; it is not clear whether he also recorded letters from John directly as Seridus did for Barsanuphius. He served in this position for nine years; during that time, he continued to mature spiritually, moving into a separate cell from the common dormitory and also starting to give spiritual direction to younger monks who came to him with their spiritual problems.

After the deaths of John and Seridus and the subsequent total seclusion of Barsanuphius between 540 and 543, the fate of Dorotheus becomes unknown. It has been suggested that he left the monastery and either joined or established a new monastery between Gaza and Maiuma or that he also finally retired to a more secluded hermitage and devoted himself fully to contemplative life while possibly still serving as archimandrite to the surrounding monasteries. According to the legendary biography of Barsanuphius from twelfth century southern Italy, Dorotheus died either in the 560s or 580s.

== Writings ==
Dorotheus main work are the Didaskaliai, a set of spiritual instructions in twenty-four sections regarding the ascetic life. Additionally, eight of his letters and a small collection of aphorisms also survive. These writings show Dorotheus as a spiritual father himself and in time became even more better known than the Correspondence of Barsanuphius and John the Prophet. His instructions combine traditional characteristics of Basilian and Pachomian monasticism, advocating for communal life, with the teachings of Barsanuphius and John, who represent the ascetic tradition of the monks of Scetis. Due to his background, Dorotheus was familiar with both the monastic and secular milieus, acting as a mediator and making often analogy with sophistic and medicine. Additionally, Dorotheus drew on theological and philosophical concepts of Greek ecclesiastic writers as well as his own personal experience and this amalgamation to the life in a monastic community gives Dorotheus' instructions their distinct character. Nevertheless, the ideal way of life he proposes does not suit only fit the monastic life but to all Christians; indeed, only the renunciation of property and celibacy apply exclusively to monks among his Didaskaliai.

As their most immediate and intimate disciple, the influence of Barsanuphius and John on Dorotheus is evident. Similar to Barsanuphius, Dorotheus was less disposed towards speculative discussion and more interested in practical guidance for monks. In fact, Dorotheos has been suggested as the compiler of the letters of Barsanuphius and John the Prophet as he survived them and would not have only had access to the manuscripts, but also would have recalled the circumstances of the questions.

There are also at least fifty-five references to the Sayings of the Desert Fathers in his writings and he has been also considered as the compiler of at least a part of these sayings. (Note: John Chryssavgis notes that Dorotheus is the only ancient author to the single quote attributed to Basil of Caesarea that appears in the Sayings and the first one to call them the Gerontikon (or the Book of Elders).) Finally, he has been also suggested as the editor of the Alloquia (conversations) of abba Zosimas, from which Dorotheus also quotes.

The title given to the Didaskaliai in the manuscripts starts with "Discourses from our holy father Dorotheos to his disciples, when he withdrew from that of Abba Seridos and, with God, founded his own monastery, after the death of Abba John the Prophet and the complete silence of Barsanuphius." While some consider this a sign that Dorotheus founded his own monastery, the possibility remains that this was added by a later copyist. It may also be that as long his holy spiritual fathers lived, he thought that he should live in obedience, keep silent and not give his own teaching and that only after their death he decided to record his own ascetic experiences in order to edify his monastic community. He presents his teaching looking to one sole aim, the edification of those to whom it is addressed. He is not interested in elegance of expression or style. Thus, his words are uncontrived, clear and simple. A careful study of the teachings of Abba Dorotheus shows a strict logical structure in an intelligible and analytic manner. The matters are not approached in a theoretical way, but on the basis of everyday reality and on his monastic experience. He primarily links his teaching with the Holy Scripture and often introduces the subjects by starting from a biblical quote or passage, mainly from the Old Testament. Furthermore, he uses biblical citations from both the Old and New Testament throughout the development of his thought. In his practical teaching, Abba Dorotheus does not ignore the theology of the Church. In his thought, theology and the practical-ascetic life coexist. He certainly is not interested in giving some doctrinal teaching. Nevertheless, his practical teaching is saturated by the faith of the Church.

== Legacy ==
Abba Dorotheus is recognized as a saint by the Eastern Orthodox Church and Roman Catholic Church and Oriental Orthodox Church with his Feast Day on June 5 in the Roman Catholic Church, June 18 (June 5 old style) in Churches of Eastern Orthodox tradition and August 13 (together with abbot Seridus) in the Eastern Orthodox Church. Both the Greek patrology devoted to the Discourses and the Bollandist Acta Sanctorum refer to him as Dorotheus the Archimandrite. He has been occasionally mistaken with Dorotheus of Tyre, who was also a monk before becoming bishop of Tyre.

Dorotheus writings, originally in Greek, were translated during Medieval times to Syriac, Arabic and Georgian. The earliest known manuscript in Greek of Dorotheus' work dates back to the tenth century, but there are Arabic translations that might go back as early as the ninth century. The first translation into Latin was made in the eleventh century and a first translation into French appeared in 1597, which was followed by a translation by the founder of the Trappist order, Abbe de Rance, in 1686. Translations into Slavonic languages begun in 1676. The first full translation into English was done by Eric Wheeler and published by Cistercian Studies in 1977.

The Didaslakiai are frequently cited by Theodore the Studite and also influenced the Benedictine, Cistercian, Trappist and even Jesuit order. Pope Francis mentioned Dorotheus of Gaza as an outstanding saint and spiritual master and quoted from his Instructions during his Christmas greetings to the Roman Curia in December 2024.

== Sources ==
Dorotheus' life is known primarily from four sources: these are his correspondence with Barsanuphius and John the Prophet, the anonymous text The Life of Dositheus (which was probably written by one of Dorotheus' disciples), the Discourses that Dorotheus wrote for instruction of his monastic community and the letters he wrote to others. François Neyt identified among the surviving correspondence of Barsanuphius and John more than hundred letters written to Dorotheus. (Note: John Chryssavgis lists in his translation of the correspondence of Barsanuphius and John letters 252-338 as addressed to Dorotheus.) Additionally, the Pratum Spirituale of John Moschus from the late sixth century mentions a "coenobium of Abba Dorotheus near Gaza and Maiuma".

== Some instructions of Abba Dorotheus ==
- Dorotheus on how to counter vices.

11. Everyone that desires salvation must not only avoid evil, but is obliged to do good, just as it says in the Psalm: "Depart from evil and do good" (Psalm 34:14). For example, if somebody was angry, he must not only not get angry, but also become meek; if somebody was proud, he must not only refrain from being proud but also become humble. Thus, every passion has an opposing virtue: pride — humility, stinginess — charity, lust — chastity, faintheartedness — patience, anger — meekness, hatred — love.

- Dorotheus on how to avoid anger.

27. It is impossible for anyone to get angry with his neighbor without initially raising himself above him, belittling him and then regarding himself higher than the neighbor.

- Dorotheus on humility.

31. Know that if a person is oppressed by some thought and he does not confess it (to his spiritual father), he will give the thought more power to oppose and torment him. If the person confesses the oppressive thought, if he opposes and struggles with it, instilling into himself the desire for the opposite to the thought, then the passion will weaken and will eventually cease to plague him. Thus with time, in committing himself and receiving assistance from God, that person will conquer the passion itself.

- Dorotheus on how to see the good in others.

44. I heard of one person that when he came to one of his friends and found the room in disarray and even dirty, he would say to himself: "Blessed is this person, because having deferred his concerns for earthly cares, he has concentrated his mind that much toward Heaven, that he doesn’t even have time to tidy up his room." But when he came to another friend's place and found his room tidy and neat, he would say to himself; "The soul of this person is as clean as his room, and the condition of the room speaks of his soul." And he never judged another that he was negligent or proud, but through his kind disposition, saw good in everyone and received benefits from everyone. May the good Lord grant us the same kind disposition, so that we too may receive benefits from everyone and so that we never notice the failings of others.

== See also ==
- List of Eastern Orthodox saints
- List of Catholic saints

== Bibliography ==
=== Translations of Dorotheus' work ===
- Dorotheus of Gaza (1963). Regnault, Lucien (translat.) (ed.). Oeuvres spirituelles. Paris : Éditions du Cerf.
- Wheeler, Eric P., ed. (1977). "Dorotheos of Gaza - Discourses and Sayings". Cistercian Studies. 33. Liturgical Press.
- Dorotheus of Gaza (2000). Scouteris, Constantine B. (translat.) (ed.). Abba Dorotheos: Practical Teaching on the Christian Life. University of Athens. ISBN 978-9-60-910141-7.

=== Further Readings ===
- Baldwin, Barry (1991). "Dorotheos of Gaza". In Kazhdan, Alexander P. (ed.). The Oxford dictionary of Byzantium. Oxford University Press. p. 654. ISBN 0-19-504652-8.
- Bitton-Ashkelony, Brouria; Kofsky, Aryeh (February 2006). The Monastic School of Gaza. Brill. pp. 36–42. ISBN 9789047408444.
- Champion, Michael W. (2022). Dorotheus of Gaza and Ascetic Education. Oxford University Press. ISBN 978-0-19-886926-9.
- Chryssavgis, John (2006). Barsanuphius and John: Letters, Volumen 1. CUA Press. ISBN 9780813201139.
- Hevelone-Harper, Jennifer Lee (2005). Disciples of the desert: monks, laity, and spiritual authority in sixth-century Gaza. Baltimore: Johns Hopkins University Press. ISBN 0-8018-8110-2.
- Storin, Bradley K.; Sogno, Cristiana; Watts, Edward J. (November 2019). Late Antique Letter Collections A Critical Introduction and Reference Guide. University of California Press. ISBN 9780520308411.
