= Seridus of Gaza =

5th century Palestinian abbot

Saint Seridus

Abba, Venerable
- Born: Palestine
- Residence: Gaza
- Died: ca. 543 AD; Gaza
- Venerated in: Eastern Orthodox Church
- Canonized: Pre-Congregation
- Feast: August 13
- Influences: Barsanuphius, John the Prophet
- Influenced: Dorotheus of Gaza
- Tradition or genre: Fathers of the desert

Seridus of Gaza (died ca. 543 AD) (also Abba Serid) was a Palestinian abbot of a monastery that was later named after him. He was disciple of the hermits Barsanuphius and John the Prophet and is venerated as saint by the Eastern Orthodox Church on 13 August.

== Biography ==
Not much is known about Seridus early life. When the hermit Barsanuphius came to live in a hilly region of Thabata, he inspired many people to come to live an ascetic life there as well, possibly including Seridus. Seridus was an extreme ascetic and nearly died due to his practices before he was healed by Barsanuphius who then became his spiritual director. Barsanuphius considered Seridus his true son and led through him the nearby monastic community as whose abbot Seridus acted.

=== Abbot ===
The monastery was located close to Thabatha and the Besor Stream, thus not far away from the older Saint Hilarion Monastery which was the first monastery in Gaza. Seridus' monastery functioned in the typical manner of Gazan monasticism: a coenobium that supported surrounding hermit cells. Under the abbacy of Seridus, the monastery was expanded on a neighbouring plot that the community had bought with the community's funds and whose owner at first refused but could be convinced with Seridus' persuasion and diplomatic skills. On this land a new church, a xenodochium, workshops and an infirmary or hospital were built. Many visitors came because of these facilities but primarily due to the presence of Barsanuphius and John the Prophet, who had moved to the region on the invitation of Barsanuphius between 525-527 and for whom Seridus also had a cell erected.

Seridus also became the only person allowed to communicate with Barsanuphius and acted as an intermediary for those who wished to receive council and spiritual direction from the hermit known as the "Old Man". The council was transmitted in letter form and recorded in Greek as Seridos did not know Coptic. The combined letters of Barsanuphius and John amount to more than 850 and were compiled later, possibly by Dorotheus of Gaza who served for some time as letter bearer to John. According to this editor, Seredius had a charismatic yet patient and tolerant personality and was able to compromise. Though there were occasional complaints of monks against Seridus, there was never a collective bitterness against him.

=== Death and Successor ===
Feeling his end near, Seridus ordained that the next abbot should pass to one of the monks he ranked on a list. Once Seridus died around the year 543, all monks on the list refused and the lowest ranked, a lay person named Aelianus who was not a monk yet, was elected only once John urged him to accept the choice.

== Legacy ==
Seridus is venerated as saint by the Eastern Orthodox Church on 13 August. The saint Vitalis of Gaza was also monk at the monastery of Seridus before the 7th century.
