= Monastery of Seridus =

Ancient monastery in Gaza, Palestine

- Location within State of Palestine
- Interactive map of Monastery of Seridus

Monastery information
- Established: 520 AD
- Disestablished: 634 AD
- Diocese: Diocese of Gaza

People
- Founder: Seridus of Gaza
- Important associated figures: Barsanuphius, John the Prophet, Seridus of Gaza, Dorotheus of Gaza

Site
- Location: Deir al-Balah, Palestine
- Coordinates: 31.447656°N 34.392875°E
- Public access: Yes

The monastery of Seridus was a monastic community that flourished during the 6th and early 7th century in Palestine. Founded by Seridus of Gaza after whom the monastery was later named, it housed in the first half of the sixth century the well-known hermits Barsanuphius and John the Prophet who attracted many visitors.

== History ==
The monastery was founded around the year 520 south of the Besor Stream and in the vicinity of Thabatha, Saint Hilarion's home town, not far from the monastery of Saint Hilarion which was possibly the first monastery in the region. Similar to the many other monasteries around Gaza, the monastery consisted of a coenobium surrounded by hermit cells.

The monastery was famous for the presence of two particular hermits: Barsanuphius of Gaza and John the Prophet. They led the monastic community through the abbot Seridus who acted as personal attendant and amanuensis to Barsanuphius. John the Prophet moved to the monastery probably between 525 and 527 on invitation of Barsanuphius who left his cell and moved into a new one constructed by Seridus. Together, they were known as the "Old Men" and lived strictly secluded from the others, communicating with the outside world only via messengers, primarily Seridus.

Under the abbacy of Seridus, the monastery was expanded on neighbouring plot that the community had bought with the community's funds and whose owner at first refused but could be convinced with Seridus' persuasion and diplomatic skills. On this land a new church, a xenodochium, workshops and an infirmary or hospital were built, attracting many visitors though the primary reason people came was to receive spiritual direction from the "Old Men". Among them was Dorotheus of Gaza who lived at the monastery for around nine years. He was assigned as responsible for the monastery's hotel and porter but was asked then, as he had brought his library including some books on medicine, to establish and run the community's hospital. In this task he was aided by Dositheus and later also . Additionally to that, Dorotheus served as letter bearer to John the Prophet for around eight years after the monk who had previously done the task had fallen sick.

In 543 the situation in the monastery changed dramatically as abbot Seridus died, followed shortly by John the Prophet, and Barsanuphius withdrew completely and did not write any more letters. Aelianos, a lay person who had been just about to enter monastic life, was elected as abbot and became the sole leader of the monastic community. Around the same time, Dorotheus left the monastery and settled in the area between Gaza and Maiuma where he founded a monastery that was named after him (the remains are still to be found).

The monastery was still existent in the seventh century and the saint Vitalis of Gaza was also for some time a monk at this monastery before he travelled to Alexandria. It is unknown what happened to the monastery after the Islamic invasion, it is possible that the monks fled to Sinai as the earliest compilation of the letters of Barsanuphius and John are from there.

== Archaeology ==
It has been proposed that the remains of a large coenobium found in Deir e-Nuserat (or Nuseirat) can be identified with the monastery of Seridus due to its location. This monastery had a courtyard surrounded by halls and numerous rooms, including a bathhouse and a hospice. There was also a church with polychrome mosaic pavement and a crypt. This monastery compares to the monastery of Martyrius in Ma'ale Adumim.

== See also ==
- List of archaeological sites in the Gaza Strip
