= Barsanuphius =

Palestinian hermit, church writer

Saint Barsanuphius the Great
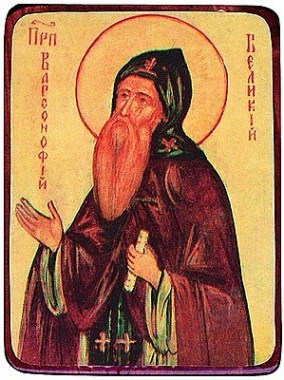
- Russian Orthodox icon of Saint Barsanuphius

Desert Father, Venerable
- Died: c. 545; Monastery of Seridus
- Venerated in: Eastern Orthodox Church; Roman Catholic Church
- Major shrine: Oria
- Feast: February 6 (Eastern Orthodox); April 11 (Roman Catholic); February 20, August 29, and August 30 (Oria)
- Attributes: Monastic vestments, holding a scroll
- Patronage: Oria, Italy
- Influences: Sayings of the Desert Fathers
- Influenced: Seridus of Gaza, Dorotheus of Gaza, Theodore the Studite

Barsanuphius (Greek: Βαρσανούφιος, romanized: Barsanouphios; Arabic: برسانوف, romanized: Barsanūf; Italian: Barsonofio, Barsanofrio, Barsanorio; died after 543), also known as Barsanuphius of Palestine, Barsanuphius of Gaza or Barsanuphius the Great (in Eastern Orthodoxy), was a Christian hermit and writer of the sixth century. He is considered one of the Desert Fathers.

Together with John the Prophet, they gave spiritual direction and advice to a variety of people in the region through letters, of which over 850 have been preserved and influenced especially Orthodox monasticism. Barsanuphius is venerated as a saint in both the Eastern Orthodox Church and the Roman Catholic Church.

== Life ==
=== Hermit ===
Born in Egypt, Barsanuphius entered the hilly region of Thavata close to Gaza at some point in the early sixth century and begun to live as a recluse in a cell near the village. The reasons for his move are uncertain, but it is possible that he did so due to the pro-Chalcedonian stance of the region compared to his native Egypt. He was already an experienced ascetic before his arrival and experienced in the tradition of the Desert Fathers, but it remains uncertain whether he was ordained a priest. Barsanuphius was Chalcedonian, though not with the same militancy as other contemporaries of his time.

In Thavata, Barsanuphius started to offer advice and spiritual direction to other ascetics who were living in the region, among other to the community of the nearby monastery which became increasingly responsible for the support of the various monks who gathered around the hermit. The abbot of the monastery, Seridus of Gaza, became the only person who communicated directly with Barsanuphius and acted as mediator for those who wished to be counselled by the hermit. As Seridus did not know Coptic, he recorded the answers in Greek. When at one point Barsanuphius became aware that some members of the monastery were doubting his existence, he revealed himself to them by coming out to wash their feet.

=== Collaboration with John the Prophet ===
Between the years 525 and 527, another hermit called John came to live in the same monastic community as disciple of Barsanuphius who surrendered his cell to John, moving into another nearby cell. Barsanuphius became known as the "Old Man" or the "Great Old Man" while John was called "The Other Old Man" or "the Prophet". John placed himself under the spiritual authority of Barsanuphius, though Barsanuphius never asserted this authority over John after he was established as an anchorite. John became the teacher of Dorotheus of Gaza who assumed a similar position to John as Seridus did to Barsanuphius. Together with John, Barsanuphius provided spiritual advice and counsel to a variety of people and wrote over 850 letters. In that, they acted in a partnership and were thought to communicate without needing to speak or write with each other.

=== Death ===
Between 543 and 544, Seridos and John died within two weeks of each other upon which Barsanuphius entered complete seclusion. A new abbot, Aelianos, was elected and Dorotheus of Gaza left the monastery. Barsanuphius died some time after that.

Nevertheless, when in 593 the Syrian Christian Evagrius Scholasticus wrote about Barsanuphius, to whom he dedicated an entire chapter of his Historia Ecclesiastica about the hermit, he recorded that it was still believed that Barsanuphius was alive. Evagrius recounts that when the patriarch of Jerusalem (assumed to be Peter of Jerusalem, 524-552) ordered the door to his cell to be opened, fire flashed out of the cell causing everyone present to flee.

== Letters ==
=== Spiritual direction through letters ===
Barsanuphius and John were sought to provide advice and spiritual direction by a diverse group of people. These included other hermits, priests, bishops and monks (including Dorotheus of Gaza) as well as lay persons of various professions. As such, they continued the tradition of spiritual direction that flourished in the deserts of Egypt, Palestine and Syria and in which a person attached themselves as to a spiritual father who had attained a sufficient level of spiritual discernment. This spiritual director was responsible for the soul of the disciple and supported him through prayer and practical advice whereas the disciple was expected to open his heart to his spiritual father and heed his advice.

Barsanuphius and John corresponded with their disciples through letters transmitted by Seridus and Dorotheus, with around 850 letters surviving (of which Barsanuphius wrote around 400). In these letters, they answered all kind of queries by their disciples, from small practicalities to deeply theological topics. Though Barsanuphius and John acted as a unified partnership and rebuked those that tried to pose the same question to each Old Men expecting different answers, their distinct personalities and epistographical style are preserved in the letters. Barsanuphius' letters reveal a strong, supportive and warm personality and his style is clear, prayerful and undeterred by issues.

In their letters, the Bible is often adapted allegorically and spiritually in order to respond to the needs of each individual. Having observed the Origenist controversy and the dangers that come with speculative exegesis of the Bible, they considered the understanding of it a lifelong exercise to be conducted with discernment and often took an anagogical approach to Scripture. Barsanuphius and John also evoked frequently the Sayings of the Desert Fathers and were also familiar with the writings of Basil the Great and Origen. Though Barsanuphius refrained from condemning Origenism, he disagreed firmly with the idea that it is possible to achieve spiritual knowledge (gnosis) as a reward for an ascetic life and thought it dangerous for monks to live as if that was possible. In general, Barsanuphius and John were averse to give precise prescriptions about progress in spiritual life and did not order their disciples to perform specific number of penitential acts but rather encouraged them to practice the virtues opposing the vices or temptations that afflicted them.

=== Composition and history of letters ===
The internal coherence and historical details of the letters, such as references to laws by emperor Justinian, elections of bishops of Jerusalem and Gaza as well as the advent of the Justinian plague, confirm the sixth-century as date of the composition of the letters. As such, the letters provide invaluable insights for the understanding of theological, ecclesiastical, social and even political history of the region of Gaza. Further, the joined authorship of the letter collection sets it apart from other late antique letter collections.

The letters were compiled by an unknown editor who suggests to have been a monk at the community while it was overseen by Barsanuphius and John and even seen Barsanuphius himself, leading some to believe him to be their disciple Dorotheus of Gaza. Though the correspondence with one person, which in some cases spanned several years, is ordered chronologically, the whole collection is not. This compiler grouped the letters together according to the type of petitioner and introduced them with a brief description of the question the petitioner posed to the Old Men.

The two earliest manuscripts containing the letters are two tenth-century Georgian translations of the Greek text from Saint Catherine's Monastery in Sinai, containing 79 letters. The letters were widely copied by Eastern monks throughout the Middle Ages. Several manuscripts were copied at Mount Athos between the eleventh and the fourteenth century, the earlier manuscripts containing only proportions of the letter collection. In the fourteenth century, two manuscripts were produced that included more than 800 letters, likely copied from different sources. The first printed edition of the letters was published in 1569 in Basel by Johann Grynaeus which included nine of John's letters together with the writings of Dorotheus. The first complete edition of the letters based on several Athonite manuscript was published in 1816 by Nikodemos, a monk from Athos. This edition was quickly translated into Russian which made them more popular among Orthodox audiences. The twentieth century anchorite Seraphim Rose did the first English translation of some selected letters based on the Russian text. The first complete English translation was done by John Chryssavgis and the letters have been also translated into various other European languages.

== Veneration ==
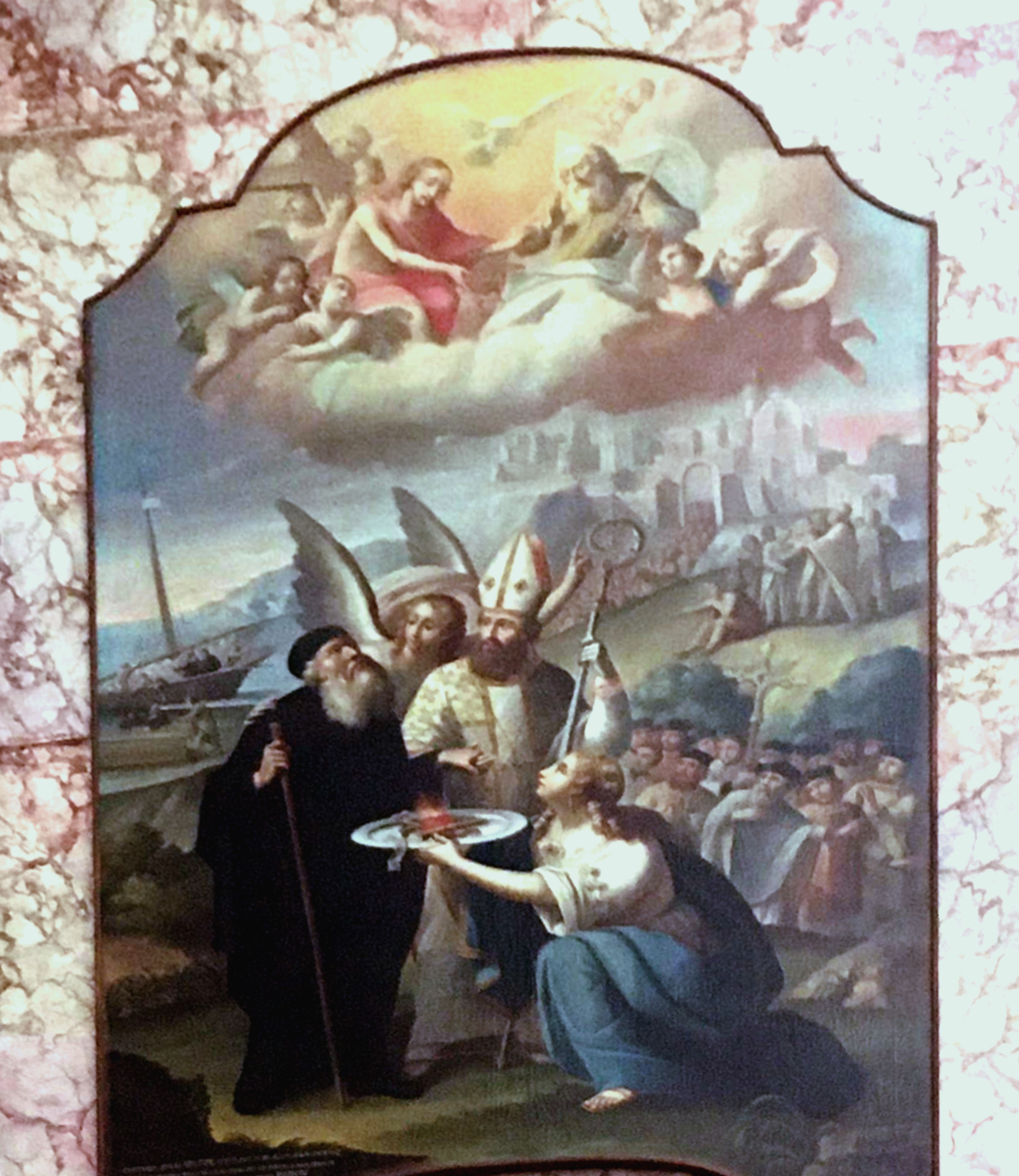
Painting by Samuele Tatulli depicting the arrival in Ostuni of the relics of Saint Barsanuphius. The three characters in the foreground are (from left to right) the saint, Bishop Theodosius and the personified diocese of Oria.

=== Sainthood ===
Barsanuphius is venerated as a saint both the Orthodox Church and Roman Catholic Church and his feast day in these churches is celebrated on 6 February and 11 April, respectively. He is not mentioned in the Coptic Synaxarion. He was one of the influences on Theodore the Studite in his reform of the Stoudios Monastery and Theodore noted that Barsanuphius was depicted on the altar cloth of the Hagia Sophia next to Anthony the Great and Ephrem the Syrian. Starting from the 10th century, the saint was also mentioned in many synaxaria in the Orthodox Church and the Russian monastery of St. Panteleimon on Mount Athos had an office for Barsanuphius and John. There were also many churches and altars dedicated to Barsanuphius in the Salento, such as in Ceglie Messapica, and his name was popular in the region after due to the translation of his relics to Oria.

=== Patron saint of Oria ===
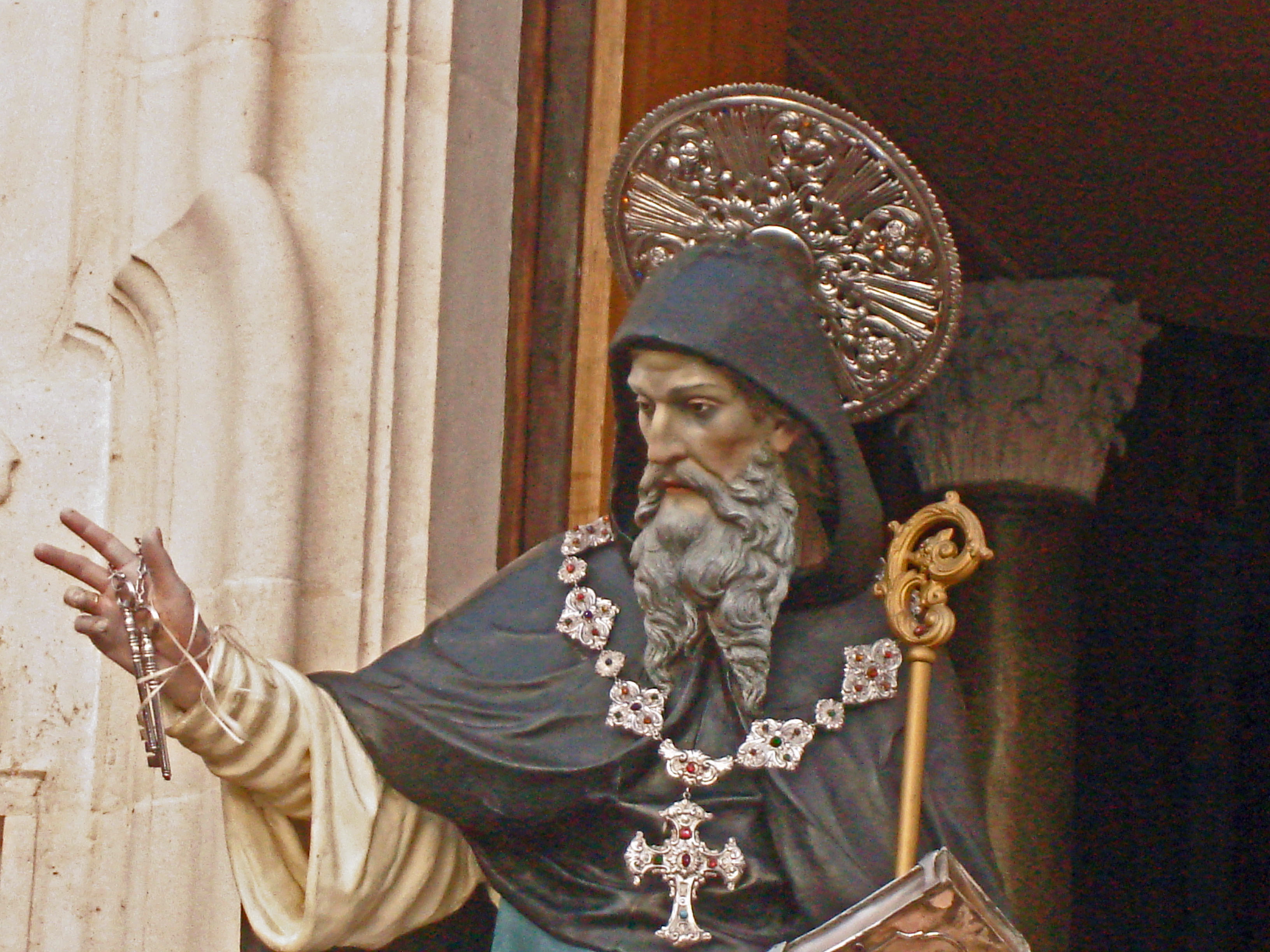
Statue of Saint Barsanuphius at Oria

Barsanuphius' relics arrived in Oria with a Palestinian monk in 850 AD. Bishop Theodosius of Oria placed these in the 880s in a chapel close to the porta Hebraea. This chapel (today under the church of San Francesco da Paola) housed the relics between 890 and 1170. During a Moorish siege and taking of the city, the relics were lost but then later rediscovered and placed in the city's basilica. In the late twelfth century, a priest composed a Latin vita of the saint which contain certain hagiographical details, including the translation of the relics to Oria.

At Oria, Barsanuphius is considered to have saved the city from destruction through war. A legend states that he repelled a Spanish invasion by appearing before the Spanish commander armed with a sword. During World War II, he is said to have spread his blue cape across the sky, thus causing a rainstorm, and preventing an air bombing by Allied Forces. As of 2023, the city still honours the saint with a procession on August 30 during which the keys of the city are handed over by the mayor to an effigy of Barsanuphius.

== Sources ==
- Chryssavgis, John (2006). Barsanuphius and John: Letters, Volumen 1. CUA Press. ISBN 9780813201139.
- Chryssavgis, John (2 June 2022). The Letters of Barsanuphius and John: Desert Wisdom for Everyday Life. Bloomsbury Publishing. pp. 48–49. ISBN 978-0-567-70486-3.
- Hevelone-Harper, Jennifer L. (12 July 2005). Disciples of the Desert: Monks, Laity, and Spiritual Authority in Sixth-Century Gaza. JHU Press. ISBN 978-0-8018-8110-7.
- Hevelone-Harper, Jennifer L. (19 November 2019). "The Letter Collection of Barsanuphius and John". In Sogno, Cristiana; Storin, Bradley K.; Watts, Edward J. (eds.). Late Antique Letter Collections: A Critical Introduction and Reference Guide. Univ of California Press. p. 424. ISBN 978-0-520-30841-1.
- Hombergen, O.C.S.O., Daniël (2004). "Barsanuphius and John of Gaza and the Origenist Controversy". In Bitton-Ashkelony, Brouria; Kofsky, Aryeh (eds.). Christian Gaza in Late Antiquity. Leiden, The Netherlands: Brill. pp. 173–181. ISBN 90-04-13868-4.
- Noble, Thomas F. X.; Smith, Julia M.H., eds. (2008). The Cambridge History of Christianity - Early Medieval Christianities c. 600-c. 1100 (PDF). Cambridge University Press. ISBN 978-0-521-81775-2.
- Paoli, Emore (2012). "Tradizioni agiografiche pugliesi tra Oriente e Occidente: il caso di san Barsanufio". BIZANTINI, LONGOBARDIE ARABI IN PUGLIANELL'ALTO MEDIOEVO Atti del XX Congresso Internazionale di Studiosull'alto Medioevo SavelletridiFasano (BR), 3-6 Novembre 2011: 405–431.
- Regnault, Lucien (1991). "Barsanuphius, Saint". The Coptic encyclopedia, volume 2. Claremont Graduate University. School of Religion.
- Safran, Linda (18 April 2014). The Medieval Salento: Art and Identity in Southern Italy. University of Pennsylvania Press. pp. 162, 295. ISBN 978-0-8122-4554-7.
- Torrance, Alexis (2013). Repentance in Late Antiquity: Eastern Asceticism and the Framing of the Christian Life C.400-650 CE. OUP Oxford. pp. 118–157. ISBN 978-0-19-966536-5.
- Torrance, Alexis (2016). "Barsanuphius, John, and Dorotheos on Scripture: Voices from the Desert in Sixth-Century Gaza". In Baker, Matthew; Mourachian, Mark (eds.). What is the Bible? The Patristic Doctrine of Scripture. Minneapolis: Fortress Press. pp. 67–81. ISBN 978-1-5064-1074-6.
- von Falkenhausen, Vera (14 October 2011). "The Jews in Byzantine Southern Italy". In Stroumsa, Guy G.; Irshai, Oded; Talgam, Rina; Bonfil, Robert (eds.). Jews in Byzantium: Dialectics of Minority and Majority Cultures. BRILL. pp. 283–284. ISBN 978-90-04-21644-0.
- Martirologio Romano (PDF). Libreria Editrice Vaticana. 2004.
