= Xenodochium =

Hostel or hospital for foreigners or pilgrims

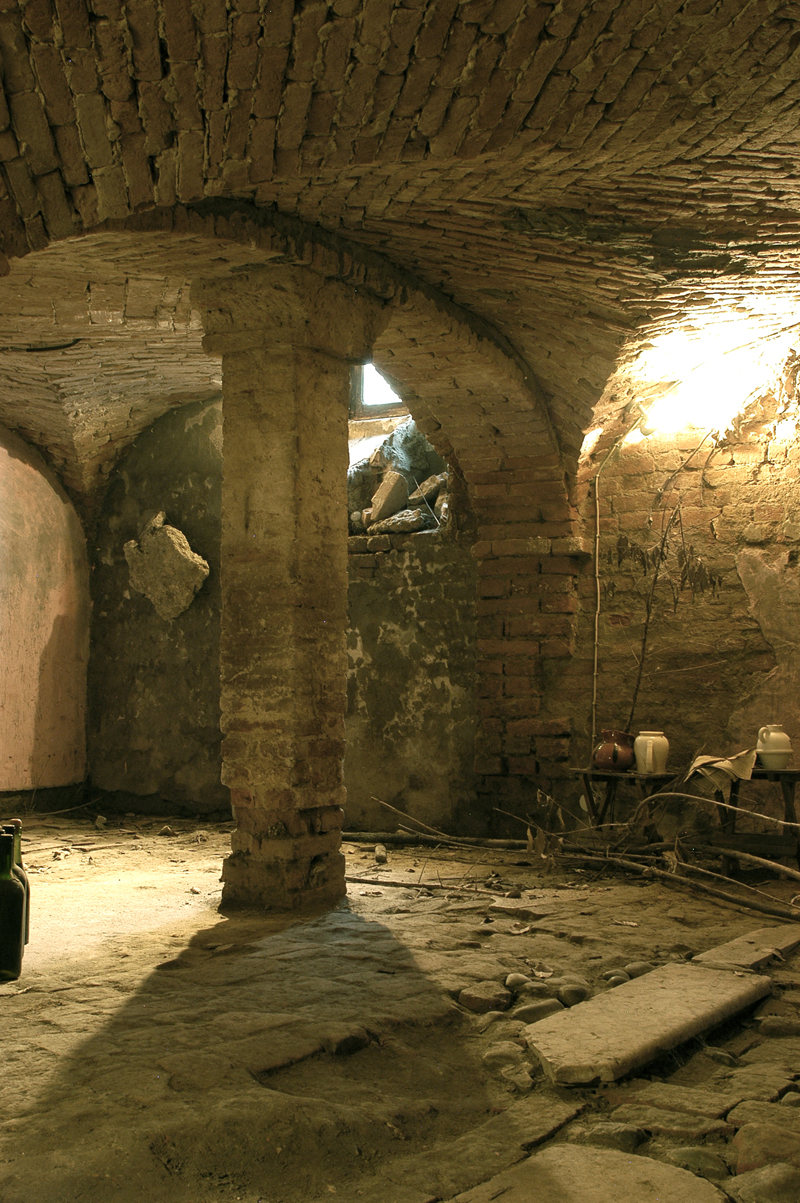

In the early Middle Ages, a xenodochium or xenodochion (from Ancient Greek ξενοδοχεῖον, xenodokheîon or xenodocheion; place for strangers, inn, guesthouse) was either a hostel or hospital, usually specifically for foreigners or pilgrims, although the term could refer to charitable institutions in general. The xenodochium was a church institution that first appeared in the Byzantine world. The xenodochium was a more common institution than any of its more-specific counterparts, such as the gerocomium (from γεροντοκομεῖον, gerontokomeîon; place for the old), nosocomium (from νοσοκομεῖον, nosokomeîon; place for the sick) or orphanotrophium (for orphans). A hospital for victims of plague was called a xenodochium pestiferorum (guesthouse of the plague-carriers).
