= John the Prophet =

6th century Greek monk and saint

Saint John the Prophet

Monk and Abbot
- Died: c. 543
- Venerated in: Roman Catholic Church; Eastern Orthodox Church
- Feast: 6 February
- Influences: Barsanuphius
- Influenced: Seridus of Gaza, Dorotheus of Gaza

John the Prophet, known also as Venerable John, was an Eastern Christian hermit of the Monastery of Seridus and teacher of Dorotheus of Gaza. He is venerated as a saint in the Roman Catholic and Eastern Orthodox churches.

== Life ==
Not much is known about John's early life, though it is known he was not ordained. Jennifer Hevelone-Harper identifies him as John of Beersheba, a monk with whom Barsanuphius of Gaza corresponded, though this remains contested.

What is known is that at some time between 525 and 527 he came to the monastery of Seridus upon invitation of Barsanuphius who gave up his cell to make space for John.

He practiced a life of silence and according to the Christian view, earned the gifts of prophecy and perspicacity, for which he earned the designation of prophet. While abbot Seridus served as scribe and letter carrier for Barsanuphius, Dorotheus of Gaza, later a famous writer, served for eight years as letter carrier for John. According to Church tradition, he knew the date of his demise and in response to Abba Elianus' request, he postponed his death for two weeks in order to instruct him on how to run the cloister. The feast day of John the prophet is marked by Eastern Orthodox Church on February, 6 (Old style).

== Sources ==
- Hevelone-Harper, Jennifer L. (19 November 2019). "The Letter Collection of Barsanuphius and John". In Sogno, Cristiana; Storin, Bradley K.; Watts, Edward J. (eds.). Late Antique Letter Collections: A Critical Introduction and Reference Guide. Univ of California Press. p. 424. ISBN 978-0-520-30841-1.
- Torrance, Alexis (2013). Repentance in Late Antiquity: Eastern Asceticism and the Framing of the Christian Life C.400-650 CE. OUP Oxford. pp. 118–157. ISBN 978-0-19-966536-5.
