= The Way of a Pilgrim =

1884 Russian literary work

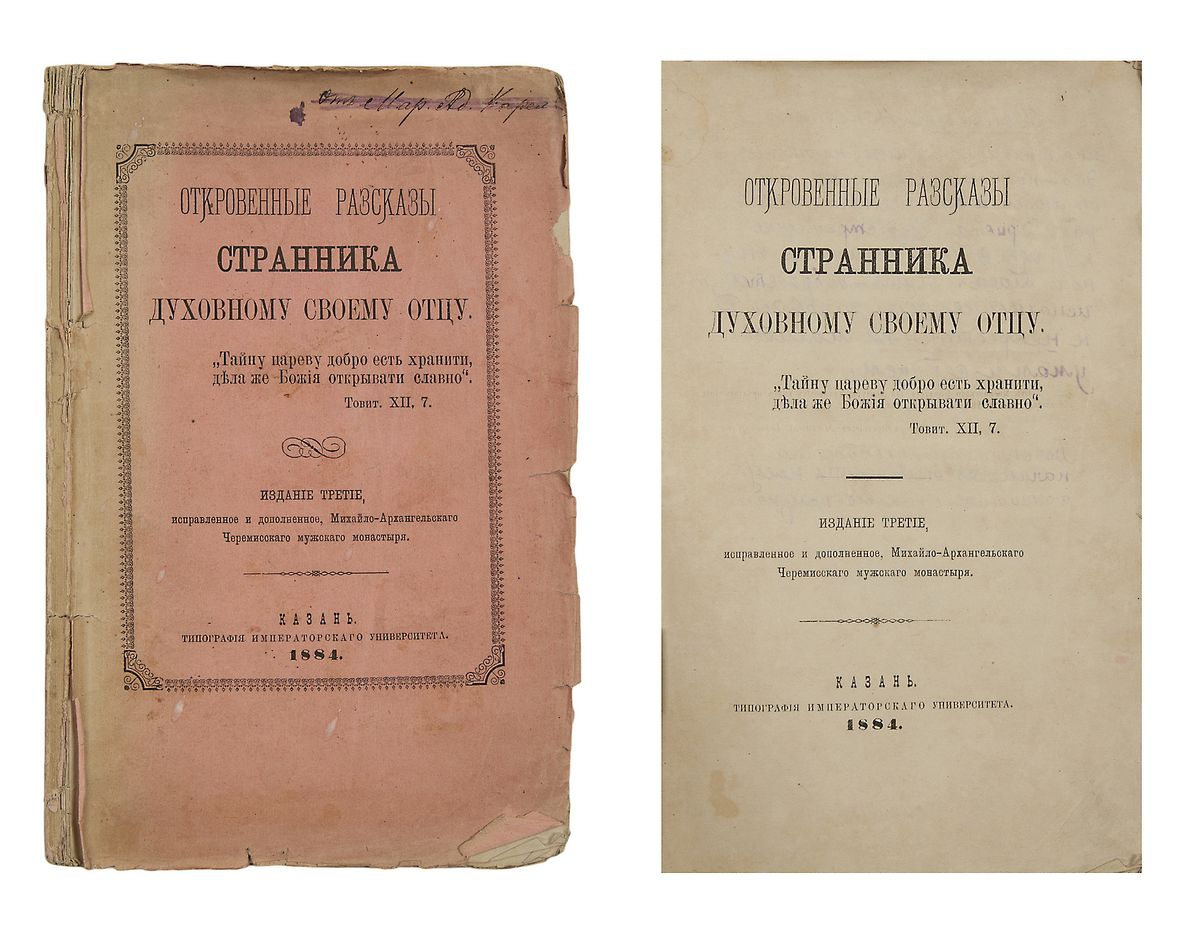
- Cover and title page of an 1884 edition
- Author: Anonymous
- Original title: Откровенные рассказы странника духовному своему отцу
- Translator: R. M. French
- Language: Russian
- Genre: Christian devotional
- Publication date: 1884
- Publication place: Russian Empire
- English publication date: 1930
- Dewey Decimal: 248.4
- LC Class: BX382 .O8513

The Way of a Pilgrim, or The Pilgrim's Tale, is the English title of a 19th-century Russian work, recounting the narrator's journey as a mendicant pilgrim (strannik) while practicing the Jesus Prayer. The pilgrim's travels take him through southern and central Ukraine, Russia, and Siberia. It is unknown if the book is literally an account of a single pilgrim, or if it uses a fictional pilgrim's journey as a vehicle to teach the practice of ceaseless inner prayer and communion with God. The Russian original, or a copy of it, was present at a Mount Athos monastery in Greece in the 19th century, and was first published in Kazan in 1884, under the Russian title that translates as Candid Narratives of a Pilgrim to His Spiritual Father (Russian: Откровенные рассказы странника духовному своему отцу, romanized: Otkrovenniye rasskazy strannika dukhovnomu svoyemu ottsu).

== Authorship ==
Critical scholarship has investigated the authorship of the four original and three supplementary tales. Aleksei Pentkovsky has argued that the first four tales survive in the form of a later redaction of an original work by Archimandrite Michael Kozlov (1826–1884), The Seeker of Unceasing Prayer, and that the supplementary tales are the work of hieromonk Arsenius Troyepolsky (1804–1870). Both of these men spent time as wanderers.

== Plot summary ==
The pilgrim's inner journey begins when he is struck upon hearing the words of Paul (in 1 Thessalonians 5:17) to "pray without ceasing." He visits churches and monasteries to try and understand how to pray without ceasing. His travels lead him to a starets (a spiritual father) who teaches him the Jesus Prayer — "Lord Jesus Christ have mercy on me" — and gives him practical advice on how to recite the prayer uninterruptedly.

The book details the gradual spiritual development and struggles of the narrator, and the effect the narrator's spirituality has on those around him. The sequel is titled The Pilgrim Continues his Way. Translations of both documents were published together in some English editions.

== Background ==
The most widely used English edition was translated by an Anglican clergyman who had served in Arkhangelsk, Reginald Michael (R. M.) French (1884-1969), and first published in 1930. In his Translator's Note, French wrote of the pilgrim that "everyone will appreciate the sincerity of his conviction and few probably will doubt the reality of his experience." French wrote that the events described in the book "appear to belong to a Russia prior to the liberation of the serfs [in] 1861." French also observed that the Pilgrim's narrative mentions the Crimean War, which began in 1853. Therefore, it was "between those two dates," 1853 and 1861, that the Pilgrim arrived at Irkutsk and found a spiritual father, two of the major events in the Pilgrim's narrative.

== Franny and Zooey ==
The Way of a Pilgrim is central to the plot of both stories in Franny and Zooey by J. D. Salinger. Franny Glass, a young college student, is fascinated with The Way of a Pilgrim, describing it as a way "to see God," and saying that the Jesus Prayer is similar to techniques in Hinduism and Buddhism. Her brother Zooey knows that Franny's copy of the book actually belonged to their late brother, Seymour. Zooey questions her seeming obsession with the prayer. Franny and Zooey became an international best-seller, and was influential in spreading the popularity of The Way of a Pilgrim outside of monastic traditions and to people of different religious backgrounds.

== Reception to the way of prayer described in the book ==
The Way of a Pilgrim is one of the most widely circulated prayer manuals in the Western world, with the Jesus Prayer possibly the most widely practiced Christian prayer after the Lord's Prayer and Hail Mary. The popularity of the book was influential in the modern rediscovery of hesychasm as a living practice. The pilgrim's method of prayer that is described in the book has received a mixed reception over the years from academics and clergy.

Saint Ignatius Bryanchaninov wrote that the book might give a student the impression that "unceasing prayer of the heart," one goal of the practice, can be achieved after only a few weeks of practice, but that the pilgrim's experience and preparation were remarkable. His life leading up to the practice, and his study under a starets (his spiritual father), prepared him for the beneficial results he received.

In an introduction to the translation by Olga Savin, Thomas Hopko describes the book as a "spiritual classic" which teaches that ceaseless prayer is not only the goal, and the one thing worth living for, but is "life itself." Like other clergy, he points out that the pilgrim teaches the practice of ceaseless prayer should be done with the guidance of a spiritual father, and with active participation in the Church and liturgy. He wrote that the book is for all who are pilgrims, and that it "provides protection and nourishment for the trip, pointing to its perils and demonstrating its rewards."

Professor of the Moscow Theological Academy Alexei Osipov speaks in an interview about his article on this subject. In his opinion, the aim of the prayer, its steps, connection of the nous and the heart, the actions of grace in the book - all contradict the teaching of the Holy Fathers and can lead to delusion (prelest). Besides many Holy Fathers, Professor Osipov cites the letters of St. Theophan the Recluse, who initially corrected one of the editions of the book. In the end of his life, St. Theophan wrote to one person not to read the book because some of its advice was not suitable for that person, as it could lead him to prelest.

Metropolitan Hilarion (Alfeyev) also cautions about the limitations of the pilgrim's method of the prayer in his book on imiaslavie and Jesus prayer. Metropolitan Hilarion writes that the pilgrim's rate of the prayer is significantly faster than in the teaching of St. Ignatius Brianchaninov and St. Theophan the Recluse, who also did not recommend to use psychosomatic method of the prayer. Metropolitan Hilarion writes that St. Theophan removed the writings of the Holy Fathers on psychosomatic method from his edition of the book and edited some parts that could cause prelest. On the other hand, Metropolitan Hilarion notes the success of the book and its role in the acquaintance of the West with the Eastern Christian practices of the Jesus prayer.

== Editions ==
- The Way of a Pilgrim: and The Pilgrim Continues His Way (1954) R. M. French (translator), Huston Smith (introduction), HarperSanFrancisco 1991 reprint: ISBN 0-06-063017-5
- The Way of a Pilgrim, and The Pilgrim Continues His Way (1978) Helen Bacovcin (translator), Walter Ciszek (foreword), Image Doubleday 1985 reprint: ISBN 0-385-46814-8
- The Way of a Pilgrim and A Pilgrim Continues His Way (1991) Olga Savin (translator), Thomas Hopko (foreword), Shambhala 2001 reprint: ISBN 1-57062-807-6
- The Pilgrim's Tale (1999) edited and with an introduction by Aleksei Pentkovsky, T. Allan Smith (translator), Jaroslav Pelikan (preface), Paulist Press, ISBN 0-8091-3709-7
- The Way of a Pilgrim (2001) abridged translation and annotation on facing pages by Gleb Pokrovsky, Skylight Paths, ISBN 1-893361-31-4
- The Way of a Pilgrim: Candid Tales of a Wanderer to His Spiritual Father (2017), Anna Zaranko (translator), Andrew Louth (introduction), Penguin Books, ISBN 0-24120-135-7

== See also ==
- Russian wandering
- Philokalia
- Hesychasm
- Poustinia
- Theosis (Eastern Orthodox theology)
- Japa
- Dhikr
