= Prelest =

Concept in Eastern Orthodox Christianity

Prelest, (Note: from Church Slavonic: пре́лесть, romanized: prélestʹ, IPA: [ˈprʲelʲɪsʲtʲ], itself from Church Slavonic: лесть, romanized: lestʹ, lit. 'charm, seduction, cajolery', IPA: [lʲesʲtʲ]; Medieval Greek: πλάνη, romanized: pláni, lit. 'wandering astray; fallacy', IPA: [ˈpla.ni]) also known as spiritual delusion, spiritual deception, or spiritual illusion, is an Eastern Orthodox Christian term for a spiritual state of false holiness or deluded self-righteousness, believing in one's own spiritual superiority.

Prelest should not be confused with mental illness, but is a spiritual illness caused by vainglory, pride, and demonic suggestion. It is said to be cured by humility and the Holy Sacraments under the guidance of one's spiritual father. In a broad interpretation, prelest afflicts everyone, as everyone has wrong thoughts, without fully understanding the meaning of life and the gravity of their sins. In a narrow sense, it refers to a person initially on the path of a pious Christian life, instead becomes proud and conceited about his or her own sanctity and triumph over sin.

In Eastern Orthodox thought, the closer people are to God, the more they see their failings, and all true saints see the foulest sins not in others, but in their own hearts and actions. The opposite state to prelest is spiritual sobriety; its opposite virtue is spiritual discernment.

== Overview ==
Ignatius Brianchaninov defines prelest as "a wounding of human nature by falsehood".

The most thorough explanation of prelest is found in the writings of St. Ignatius Brianchaninov, based on the traditions of the Holy Fathers of the first centuries. His writings were compiled in the book On prelest, which details different forms of delusion (wrong ways of prayer, trusting dreams, excessive zeal, false humility etc.), and recounts recent cases. St. Ignatius defines prelest as "wounding of human nature with falsehood" and "man's assimilation of falsehood which he accepts as truth".

Some modern ascetics such as elder Joseph the Hesychast, elder Paisios of the Holy Mountain, and Elder Daniel Katounakiotis also wrote about prelest.

The concept is very important in Orthodox spirituality and asceticism. It is considered one of the main dangers for a Christian (especially monastic) when beginning the Jesus prayer, or more generally in the first years as an Orthodox Christian.

Identifying the manifestations of prelest is called discernment of spirits. The virtue of discrimination "is greater than any other virtue; and is the queen and crown of all the virtues". According to Orthodox Holy Fathers, it corresponds to a very high degree of spiritual maturity and requires three renunciations (Evagrius, St. John Cassian, St. John Climacus): separation from the world, inner struggle with passions, and acquisition of prayerful spiritual knowledge. Discrimination comes after a long experience of fighting the passions, flowing from the action of Divine grace and the practice of humility.

Professor N.E. Pestov writes that the safest spiritual path to avoid prelest is to habitually submit to an experienced and holy elder, or at least to respect the advice of others. The fastest way to prelest is to trust one's own thoughts above others' advice.

== General prelest and prelest proper ==
According to Saint Ignatius Brianchaninov, "Spiritual deception is the state of all men without exception, and it has been made possible by the fall of our original parents. All of us are subject to spiritual deception. Awareness of this fact is the greatest protection against it. Likewise, the greatest spiritual deception of all is to consider oneself free from it".

Theophan, the Archbishop of Poltava, comments on this statement of St. Ignatius briefly by setting apart "general prelest" and prelest in its "proper sense" of the word. On the bases of all the above-mentioned he gives the following definition: "Briefly, the difference between 'general prelest' and prelest in the particular sense of the word can, on the basis of the above, be expressed thus. General prelest is forgetting and not noticing one's sinfulness. That which we call prelest proper is attributing to oneself righteousness when it does not actually exist. If a man thinks he is righteous, then his righteousness is not divine, but diabolical, foreign to the grace of God and to humility. One should recall the famous saying of Abba Poemen the Great: 'I prefer a man who sins and repents to one who does not sin and does not repent. The first has good thoughts, for he admits that he is sinful. But the second has false, soul-destroying thoughts, for he imagines himself to be righteous' (Bp. Ignatius, Patericon, 75)".

== View from the outside ==
According to Orthodox Holy Fathers, it is possible to consider someone holy only when viewing from the outside. Considering oneself holy is a clear manifestation of prelest because the closer someone is to God, the more sinful they see themselves. St. Macarius the Great says: "if you see that someone is arrogant and proud of that he is a partaker of grace, then even if he created miracles and raised the dead, but if he does not recognize his soul as honourless and despised, and himself poor in spirit and vile, he is robbed by malice not knowing that for himself. Even if he creates miraculous signs, one should not believe him, because the sign of Christianity – for the ones who are well-versed before God, is to strive to hide it from people, and if he has all the king's treasures, to hide them and always say: "this is not my treasure, the other put it at my place, and I am a beggar, when the one who put it will want, he will take it away from me." If someone says: "I am rich, I'm quite enough of what I have acquired, and I don't need more of it," then this is not a Christian, but a vessel of delusion and of the devil. For the enjoyment of God is insatiable, and to what extent one tastes and communes is, in such a way becomes more greedy. Such people have an eagerness and uncontrollable love for God, the more they try to succeed and gain, the more they recognize themselves as poor, as they are meager in everything, and have not gained anything. They say: "I am not worthy that this sun illuminates me." This is a sign of Christianity, this is humility."

St. Ignatius (Brianchaninov) writes that "humility does not see itself humble. On the contrary, it sees in itself a lot of pride. It takes care to find all its branches; looking for them, it sees that there is still a lot to look for."

St. John Cassian writes that "a cleaner look notices more, a reproachful life gives rise to a great sorrow of self-reproach, the correction of morals and zeal for virtues multiply wailing and sighing. For no one can be satisfied with the degree of perfection in which he has succeeded, and the cleaner one will be in the spirit, the more he sees himself unclean, the more he finds reasons for humility. And the faster he strives for height, the more he sees that he has more where to strive."

St. Paisios of the Holy Mountain says that "a man who considers himself a saint and prays for others, considering them sinners, is disgusting to God".

St. Anthony (Putilov) of Optina writes in his diary that "I saw that only then I was in a true opinion of myself when I had a bad thought about myself; and when I had a good thought I was in delusion".

== Kinds of prelest ==
Saint Gregory of Sinai also says about several forms of delusion:

1. Illusory visions and mental images and fantasies, caused by arrogance and self-conceit: "arrogance is followed by delusion, delusion by blasphemy, blasphemy by fear, fear by terror, and terror by a derangement of the natural state of the mind".
2. Diabolic influence – "it has its origin in self-indulgence, which in its turn results from so-called natural desire. Self-indulgence begets licentiousness in all its forms of indescribable impurity." This form includes visions and gift of prophecy that some people have, in fact originating from the demons of licentiousness.
3. Mental derangement – a result of the first two forms.

=== Prelest and insanity ===
According to St. Ignatius Brianchaninov, St. Gregory of Sinai, St. Symeon the New Theologian, Valaam Elder Schema-Abbot John (Alexeev) and other ascetics, the first kind of prelest (prayer with imagination) very often leads to insanity. The second kind (conceit) sometimes does not result in a mental disease, but the person cannot achieve salvation being in a state of one of the seven deadly sins – pride. St. Ignatius writes about it: "This kind of prelest – is terrible: it is equally fatal for the soul as the first one, but is less evident; it rarely ends in madness, suicide, but definitely corrupts both the mind and the heart."

=== False visions ===
According to the Holy Fathers, false visions are associated with pride. St. Ignatius Brianchaninov says that those people, who want to see visions, and whose mind is not renewed and recreated by the Holy Spirit, are filled with pride – that means, as writes St. Ignatius, that there is a connection between prelest of the first and the second kind (i.e. between "imagination" and "conceit"). Archimandrite Seraphim (Alexiev) says: "Where there is pride and at the same time one has a vision – it can not be from God, but by all means – from the evil one."

Romanian elder Cleopa Ilie specifies 7 ways of falling into delusion of false visions and dreams:

1. Pride;
2. Vainglory;
3. Weak and inexperienced mind;
4. Reckless zeal;
5. Disobedience;
6. Following own will and concealment of thoughts in confession;
7. Not knowing self and the Divine Scriptures.

Elder Cleopa also provides examples of different saints from the Patericon who rejected the visions because they considered themselves unworthy to see it and due to the danger of delusion. He also quotes arguments of different Holy Fathers saying that one should not easily accept visions even if they have all attributes of true ones – if the saints were fast to accept visions they would be deluded and would not have become saints.

Elder Joseph the Hesychast says, mentioning the examples from his life, that true visions are always preceded or followed by very intense suffering and sorrows and are given by God only as a consolation. Even if the vision is true, it is very difficult to withstand the fight with thoughts and not to get proud of the fact of the vision. Elder Joseph writes about pride after visions: "What happens after that? A person becomes the mock of the demons. They fool him with writings and visions, with dreams and revelations, with symbols and numbers, with oracles and a heap of superstitions."

Elder Paisios of the Holy Mountain tells such story about a woman who had one true vision. The Devil then suggested to her that she was chosen by God, which she believed; followed this, demons started to torment her with different visions and revelations. In the end, she had another true vision and was told to write to Elder Paisios so that he could help her. Out of all her visions, Elder Paisios says that only two were from God.

Elder Daniel Katounakiotis also writes about several such cases of long condition of prelest accompanied by visions. He writes in a letter about one hierodeacon by the name of Ierotheos who had many visions. Even though he confessed everything, none of the confessors understood that these visions were a delusion. Elder Sabbas then advised him to find out the truth. After that the delusion was revealed. However, in spite of the fact that the visions ceased after repeated exorcism, the injury to the soul of Ierotheos remained very serious and later he broke all monastic vows. Another case of prelest happened to a layman, Nicolaus. He was also subjected to a long and strong action of demons. Even though Elder Daniel convinced Nicolaus that all his visions were false, the traces of delusion were seen to the end of his life.

In the book "The Great Watch", in the notes of Elder Jerome (Solomentsov) from St. Panteleimon monastery on Mount Athos, the life of hieroschemamonk Theophan is described. He had many visions, and for 15 years he confessed everything to the spiritual father. But then he became noticeably more concealed and proud. He began to think that the spiritual father does not lead such a high life as he does. Once, when he visited the confessor, he told him about some of his visions and then let it slip like this: "And I was not ordered to tell you about some visions." To this the confessor said, "I congratulate you on your prelest!" When he did talk about the two visions that he had concealed, it turned out that they were false. One of the key points was the question of freedom of mind during the vision - if the mind can control the vision, then it is not true (for example, St. Maximos Kavsokalyvites talks with St. Gregory about this). In the years of his life to follow, father Theophan was unable to free himself from his delusion: he left Athos, engaged in trade and died in a state of torment.

St. Silouan the Athonite speaks about artificially invoking contemplations that "Divine contemplations are given to a person not when he is looking for them, and when looking for precisely them, but when the soul descends into the hell of repentance and really feels itself worse than any creature. Contemplations, as if "forcibly" reached by the mind, are not true but "imaginary"; and when this imaginary is taken for truth, then conditions are created in the human soul that impede the very possibility of the action of grace, that is, genuine contemplation".

=== Self-conceit ===
St. Ignatius Brianchaninov writes that "people infected with prelest of 'conceit' are very common. Anyone who does not have a contrite spirit, who recognizes any own merits and achievements, anyone not holding steadily the teaching of the Orthodox Church, but discussing about any dogma or tradition arbitrarily, at his discretion, or according to the heterodox teaching, is in this kind of prelest. The degree of deviation and persistence of deviation determines the degree of prelest".

There is an example when "conceit" may also result in a mental disease. Hieromartyr Bishop Arseny (Zhadanovsky) in his "Spiritual Diary" writes about one woman who was in this kind of delusion. She wanted to take Holy Communion every day. When she was forbidden to do so, she started to serve the Divine Liturgy herself at her home. "Her case, however, ended sadly. She lost her mind and she is currently in the mental hospital."

=== False gifts ===
Sometimes the demons can "help" a deluded person. This "help" can include either recommendations about certain things, even theological and very complicated, or can take the form of false spiritual gifts: false healing ability, false clairvoyance, false gift of prophecy, false unceasing prayer, false power over demons, false reading of thoughts, false dispassion.

An inexperienced person, not knowing enough about true Divine gifts, to whom and under which conditions they can be given, can easily accept such false gift as being Divine. Such false gift can be received either together with some evident external event like an appearance of false "Christ" sending the "gift", or can happen gradually and unnoticeably for the receiving person. Some people who received false gifts prematurely and due to conceit prayed to God asking to send them a gift and they did receive it, but from the demons. Others did not ask anything explicitly, but were already conceited and considered themselves worthy, i.e. were in the state of prelest of the second kind.

Metropolitan Anthony of Sourozh recalls that when he was young, he had an ability to read thoughts of other people. Once he asked God: "If this gift is not from You, dispel it". And this ability immediately disappeared. It is very difficult for a conceited person to decline such gift, to consider oneself unworthy of receiving it and ask God to take the gift away. If these false gifts are accepted by the deluded person, it can lead him/her into demon possession or suicide.

=== Passion of teaching ===
Apostle James warns against unauthorized teaching in his Epistle: "My brethren, be not many masters, knowing that we shall receive the greater condemnation" (James 3:1). If the desire of teaching in the particular person originates from the passions of vainglory and pride rather than from love and humility, it becomes a kind of prelest, being based on a false idea of personal dignity and ability to teach and that such teaching is pleasing to God. Archbishop Averky (Taushev) in his analysis of James 3:1 says that one should start teaching with the great caution and distrust to oneself.

=== Carelessness ===
Schema-archimandrite Abraham (Reidman) in his book of conversations with the monastics also thinks that carelessness is delusion and says that carelessness in some sense is opposite to pride, but even more dangerous. A very common manifestation of carelessness is the weakening of abstemiousness in food.

== Causes of prelest ==
According to Saint Gregory of Sinai, there are 3 sources for prelest: "arrogance, the envy of demons, and the divine will that allows us to be tried and corrected. Arrogance arises from superficiality, demonic envy is provoked by our spiritual progress, and the need for correction is the consequence of our sinful way of life. The delusion arising solely from envy and self-conceit is swiftly healed, especially when we humble ourselves. On the other hand, the delusion allowed by God for our correction, when we are handed over to Satan because of our sinfulness, God often permits to continue until our death, if this is needed to efface our sins. Sometimes God hands over even the guiltless to the torment of demons for the sake of their salvation".

=== Most likely time to fall into prelest ===
Elder John Krestiankin in his word about spiritual guiding says that the most dangerous time in relation to prelest is the beginning of the spiritual life. "Upon entering the Church, winged with new sensations, the newly-born reaches with his consciousness straight for the Kingdom of Heaven, to the heights of mysteries that are hidden behind the impenetrable curtain of Divine revelation. At that moment the spiritual father and his spiritual child enter into a unified struggle with the dark powers, the latter of which are ready with their deceit to turn the new convert from the path of salvation. The enemy's deception will hunt after this person for the rest of his life, offering him its dangerous sweetness. This initial period is particularly dangerous, for this sweetness still resonates with the nature of the fleshly man, and finds sympathy and response deep within his soul. The spiritual father's strength in this struggle lies in prayer and love for his spiritual child's soul, which has come to desire its own salvation. The spiritual child's protection lies in his trust of the pastor, in the awareness of his own sinfulness, and mistrust of himself".

=== Expectation of grace ===
The very thought about forthcoming grace and receiving Divine gifts, expectation of grace is a clear manifestation of pride. St. Ignatius writes: "If there is an expectation of grace within you – beware, you are in a dangerous state! [...] Prelest exists already in self-conceit, in considering oneself worthy, in the very expectation of grace."

Schema-archimandrite Abraham (Reidman) reminisces about his youth, when he did not pray with the Jesus Prayer, did not know any experienced elders, and did not read the books of the Holy Fathers. He read for the first time the conversation of St. Seraphim of Sarov with Motovilov, but understood it in a primitive way and began to pray about acquisition of grace. As a result, he began to see visions from demons. Fortunately, later he came to his senses and realized that he was in delusion.

== Healing ==
If the person sees any vision, he should tell it immediately to his spiritual father and not conceal anything.

For example, it is written in Patericon of Mt. Athos about one monk who was living with his elder in a skete at Mt. Athos. Because of conceit, he gradually started to fulfill his own will, prayed more and more but without asking his elder about it. Then he was deluded by false visions, almost died and finally revealed everything to his elder. The elder sent him to a monastery and forbade to take Holy Communion for 3 years. The monk started to live there with many brethren, washed dishes and recovered.

Another story about healing through work therapy is told by Hieromartyr Archimandrite Kronid (Lyubimov). A novice by the name of Alexander from Holy Trinity St. Sergius Lavra arbitrarily increased his prayer rule and started to see visions. When his condition was revealed, he was sent to another monastery and was given an obedience to clean the horse stalls in the stable yard. At first, he protested: "You appoint such a great ascetic to such a humiliating obedience", but then he agreed and all brethren started to pray about him. Alexander worked all day long and did not have time for his previous intensive prayer feats. Several years later Archimandrite Kronid met Alexander who was already tonsured a monk as Athanasius and, for his humble and good monastic life, was made hierodeacon. When asked whether he remembered what had happened to him, he replied: "I remember everything, but only now realize the full horror of my state of mind."

Archimandrite Ambrose (Yurasov) tells a story about a deluded woman who arbitrary increased her prayer rule to 1000 prostrations every day because of conceit. She was concealing it from her spiritual father. When the spiritual father revealed the delusion through her hidden anger and petulance, she no longer could execute even her initial smaller rule of prayer and prostrations, she could not fast at all and even could not read morning and evening prayers. Another case occurred with Archimandrite Parthenios, hegumen of St. Paul Monastery at Mount Athos. When he was young, he fell into negligence and stopped reading the monastic rule. This went on for a whole year. In the end, he suddenly cried out: "Mother of God, help me, I can not do anything. Make it so that I overcome this state!". And the state of negligence suddenly disappeared: he immediately made 400 prostrations.

== Orthodox saints who suffered from prelest and recovered ==
Saint Iakovos worshiped a demon who appeared as Lord Jesus and who disappeared after Iakovos made the sign of the Cross.

Saint Nicetas of the Kiev Caves attempted an excessive feat of seclusion without sufficient experience. He was deluded by an "angel" who helped him and gave him a false gift of clairvoyance. When the Holy Fathers of the monastery unraveled the demon tricks and cast the "angel" away, St. Nicetas lost his supernatural abilities and even could not read at all. Later, following the way of humility, St. Nicetas became the Bishop of Novgorod and received the gift of miracleworking.

Saint Theodore and Basil of the Kiev Caves suffered heavily from the demon tricks. St. Theodore was deluded by a vision of "angel" and false appearance of a demon in the form of St. Basil and was listening to them. Later, St. Basil brought St. Theodore to reason and convinced that it was a delusion.

Saint Silouan the Athonite was in delusion 2 times as written in the book of elder Sofronii. Once St. Silouan accepted a vision and nobody, whom he asked about it, told him that this was a false vision. "But I was beguiled by vanity and began to see devils again. Then I knew that I had been deceived, and I made full disclosure to my confessor and asked him for his prayers; and because of his prayers I am now saved and ever beseech the Lord to grant me the spirit of humility."

== The term "prelest" in the liturgical texts of the Eastern Orthodox Church ==
The notion of prelest is used in some of the liturgical texts of the Eastern Orthodox Church.

In the Great Canon of St. Andrew of Crete: "I lie naked and ashamed, for the beauty of the tree, which I saw in the middle of the garden, deceived me" (Monday, Ode 2); "O God, Trinity yet One, save us from delusion, temptations and misfortune!" (Monday, Ode 3); "But you, my hopeless soul, have rather imitated Esau, surrendering to the crafty evil the beauty you inherited from God. In two ways, works and wisdom, have you been deceived and now is the time for you to change your ways" (Tuesday, Ode 4).

In the Holy Anaphora of the Liturgy of St. Basil the Great: "and was led astray by the deception of the serpent", "Releasing us from the delusions of idolatry".

== Prelest and Jesus prayer ==
Many Orthodox Holy Fathers and modern ascetics wrote about the dangers of wrong practice of the Jesus prayer and prayer in general: Saint Symeon the New Theologian, Saint Ignatius Brianchaninov, Saint Theophan the Recluse, Saint Ambrosius of Optina, Saint Macarius of Optina, Elder Joseph the Hesychast, Valaam Elder John (Alexeev) and others.

Professor of the Moscow Theological Academy A.I. Osipov analyzes the teaching on the prayer by St. Ignatius (Brianchaninov) and points out that the prayer should have three properties: attention, reverence, repentance. Also humility should be the basis of the prayer as St. Ignatius says: "Today I read the declaration of St. Sisoes the Great, which I always particularly liked. A monk said to him: 'I am in constant memory of God'. St. Sisoes responded to him: 'That is not great; it will be great when you consider yourself to be worse than any creature.' St. Sisoes continues: constant memory of God is a very elevated activity!! However, this height is very dangerous, when the ladder to it is not founded on the solid rock of humility" (Holy Fathers use the words "memory of God" as a synonym for the Jesus prayer).

Also, Metropolitan Ierotheos (Vlachos) in the book A Night in the Desert of the Holy Mountain speaks of the following errors in the prayer:

- The idea that grace and vision of the Uncreated Light can be gained quickly. In reality, for most people it takes years. Therefore, a person may become disappointed if he does not quickly acquire it;
- Great importance is attributed to psychotechnical methods (paying attention to inhalation-exhalation, heartbeat, etc.), while they do not act magically, but are only auxiliary means of reducing distraction;
- Jumps, skipping stages during the development of the prayer. Some go directly to noetic prayer or want to connect the nous and the heart right away through breathing, skipping oral prayer.
- Disappointment if there are no tears. Or vice versa, a person told someone about his tears and they disappeared because of that;
- A strong desire to see the Uncreated Light – then demons can demonstrate for the ascetic their own "uncreated light". The very thought that "I am worthy to see the Uncreated Light" is a dangerous state;
- Violation of obedience – the thought not to ask the director originates from the enemy.

=== Attention during prayer ===
==== Three ways of attention and prayer ====
St. Symeon the New Theologian, St. Theophan the Recluse, and St. Silouan the Athonite say that there are three ways of prayer:

1. prayer with imagination,
2. prayer with attention in the mind,
3. union of the mind with the heart.

=== Magicism and "automatic" view of prayer ===
One of the kinds of false attitude to prayer originates from a widespread view on God, prayer, and spiritual life, implying that God can be "forced" to execute the petition that is asked in the prayer, i.e. as if the prayer acts "by itself", solely by pronouncing the words, with no regard to the spiritual condition of the person who prays.

This "automatic" view can apply to any relationship with God, to any action of Divine grace including the prayer and Sacraments. Orthodox theologian Fr. Valery Dukhanin writes that such view has nothing to do with Orthodox faith and rather belongs to magic: "The main property of magic – correct ritual. That is a drastic difference with the Sacraments of the Church, which cannot help without man's personal relation to God".

Unconditional action of prayer assumes that free will does exist neither in man nor in God and that God can do something harmful and with no regard to the inner determination of all involved persons. St. Hilarion of Optina writes that though we should pray about each other, the view on prayer that every petition is necessarily executed originates from pride and leads to delusion.

The Valaam elder schema-hegumen John (Alekseev) writes about Jesus prayer: "Why do we read the Jesus Prayer? So that, constantly remembering the Lord and repenting of sins come to spiritual peace, inner silence and love for our neighbor and righteousness, then we live in God, who is love. But there are people who look at this prayer as a kind of magic that will give them reading of minds, insight, the gift of miracles and healings, etc. This approach to prayer is extremely sinful. Those who act so are deceived by demons who give them some kind of power to destroy them altogether, forever".

Professor A.I. Osipov writes that "an awareness of magic is deeply present in our 'old man'. For very many people, Orthodoxy consists in placing candles, 'venerating', donating something, leaving prayer requests, ordering Liturgies, molebens and pannikhidas, joining in the cross processions, visiting holy shrines, confessing and receiving Communion. The most important part of salvation, life according the commandments and repentance, remains undone. However, without spiritual transformation (in Greek, the word for repentance is μετάνοια [metanoia], which means to change one's way of thinking), all of these external activities are at the least useless, and at the worst harmful, for they can cause one to feel self-righteous and raise his self-opinion over "sinners.""

Also some holy fathers wrote about such "automatic" attitude to the Sacraments (i.e. without faith and willingness to fight with passions): St. John Chrysostom, St. Mark the Ascetic, St. Cyril of Jerusalem. Such false "automatic" attitude to the action of Holy Sacraments is named by A.I. Osipov as one of the reasons of degeneration of Christian faith and backsliding into paganism.

== Delusions of Antichrist ==
Apostles Paul and John say in their epistles that Antichrist will come right before the end of times (2 Thess. 2, 1 John 2:18). His coming will be accompanied by false miracles and signs. Father Nikita Grigoriev in his book "Faith and delusion" writes about Antichrist that "in appearance, he will be kind, gentle, patient and merciful. He will attract everyone by his "love" and will amaze everyone with his "miracles" but this "love" will be false just as the "miracles" will likewise be false. Moreover, this "love" will not be salvific for the people, but destructive because it will not call people to genuine repentance, to take up one's Cross, to spiritual rebirth through the Holy Spirit in the Church of Christ. No, the anti-Christ's love will condone human passions. From the very beginning, in Paradise, when man fell, he did not want to hear about his sin; he did not wish to repent and be forgiven. He wanted to remain in his sin and justify it. The anti-Christ will not rebuke passions and call people to genuine contrition of heart in order to forgive and heal them, but on the contrary will justify them just as they are. It will make people feel good about themselves as they are."

== Eastern Orthodox views on the lives of certain E. Orthodox elders and saints ==
Professor of the Moscow Theological Academy A.I. Osipov in his lecture course on "Basic Theology" speaks in one of the lectures (as well as in the textbook for this course and some other public lectures) about false way of prayer and false spirituality. He says that some books containing errors appeared recently.

== Eastern Orthodox views on the lives of certain Catholic saints ==
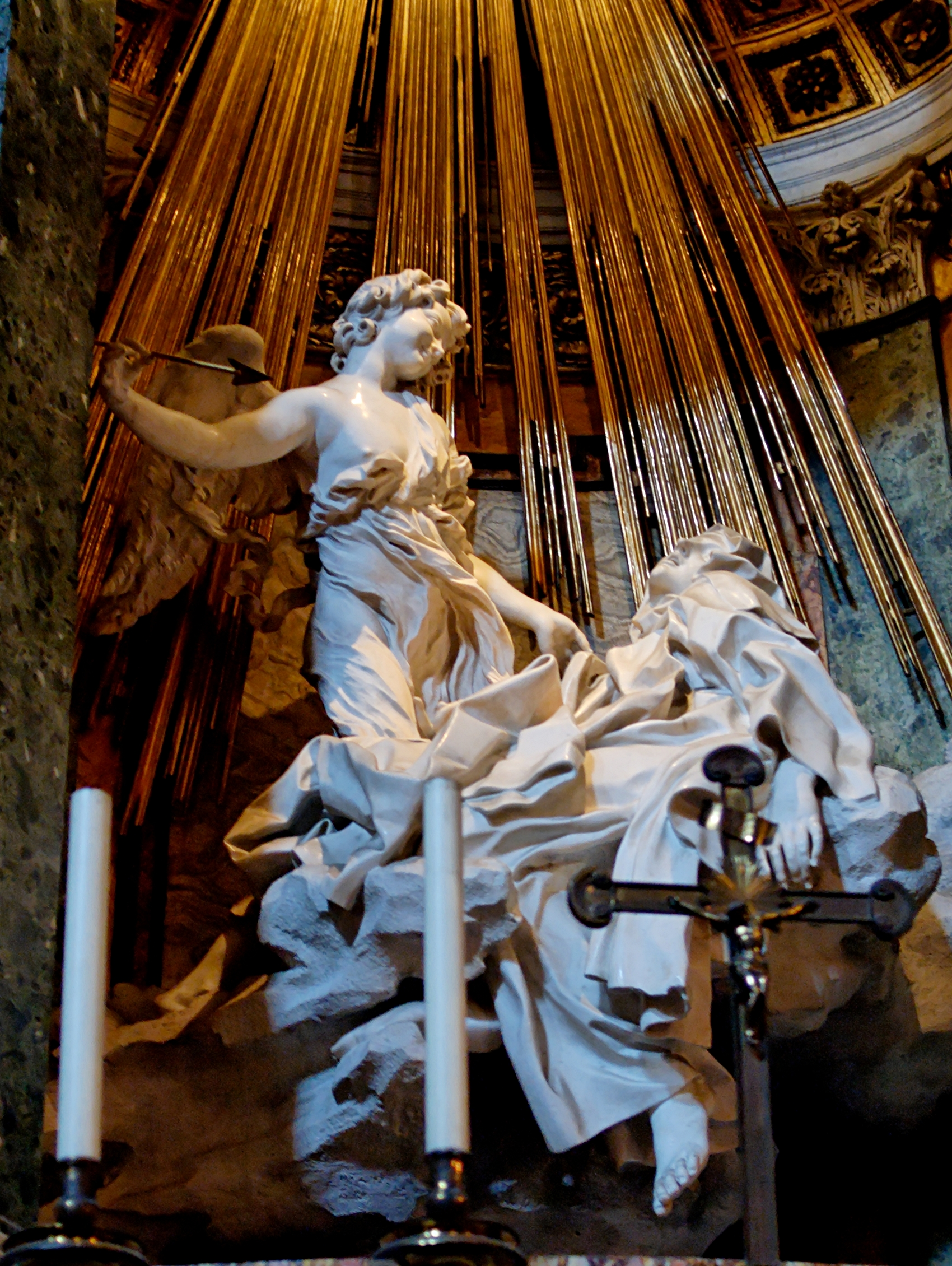
The Ecstasy of St. Theresa, Gianlorenzo Bernini, 1652

St. Ignatius Brianchaninov provides examples of visions and other mystical experiences of St. Francis of Assisi, St. Ignatius of Loyola, Thomas à Kempis and compares them with experience of Orthodox saints of the first centuries. Professor A.I. Osipov analyzes teachings on this subject by St. Ignatius and points at a significant difference in Orthodox and Roman Catholic view on spirituality, repentance and humility. He writes in a book which is a textbook for the Basic theology course in the Moscow Theological Academy that there are many phrases attributed to St. Francis that reveal his true degree of humility:

Saint Francis's very life's goal, ("I have labored and want to labor … because this brings honor," "I want to suffer for others and redeem the sins of others"), shows his fall which he himself does not see; it shows his own sins. At the end of his life, he said, "I am not aware of any sin I have committed which I have not redeemed through confession and repentance. His dying words were, 'I have fulfilled what I should have fulfilled.'"

By comparison, we shall cite the last moments of Saint Sisoes the Great (fifth century):

Surrounded by the brothers at the moment of his death, he was as if talking with invisible beings. The brothers asked him, "Father, tell us, with whom are you speaking?" He answered, "With angels who have come to take me; but I am begging them to leave me for a short time, in order to repent." The brothers knew that Sisoes was perfect in the virtues, and protested, "You have no need to repent, Father." Sisoes answered, "Truly, I do not know if I have even begun to repent."

Sisoes' deep understanding of his own imperfection is the main outstanding trait of all true saints and is the most important sign that their revelations were true.

However, it is worth noting that the words of St. Francis "I have fulfilled what I should have fulfilled" in this quote (taken from the referenced book of Prof. A.I. Osipov in English), were taken by A.I. Osipov from another book in Russian, which in turn took it from another book. For comparison, the life of St. Francis by St. Bonaventure contains it in the following from: "I have done what was mine to do" (P. 150). The interpretation of such words and relation to humility is explained, in particular, in the book by Mitrofan Lodyzhensky "Light Invisible" adapted in the shorter article by Father George Macris. Even then, while not well-known in Orthodox circles, it is well known in Catholic ones that this biography of Saint Francis is considered mostly fictional, written in contrast to the earlier and more historically accurate Thomas of Celano's Vita Prima.

Father George Macris writes that "in his farewell address to the Franciscans, St. Francis said: "Now God is calling me, and I forgive all my brethren, both those present and those absent, their offenses and their errors and remit their sins as far as it is in my power." Fr. Macris believes these words mean Francis felt himself to be "powerful" enough to remit sins like the Pope. However, that in Roman Catholicism, religious superiors have the power to remit sins against the rule of the community, and it is likely that this commentator is simply not aware of this ancient practice in the West.

Prof. A.I. Osipov also says that there are 3 main manifestations of delusions of Catholic mystics:

- compassion of Christ that reaches its ultimate degree (e.g. St. Francis of Assisi);
- "matrimony with God, flirting with God, romance with God etc." (e.g. St. Teresa of Ávila)––although it is worth noting that, contrary to Osipov's use of the term, "flirting" is not accepted term or practice in the Teresan tradition;
- "dreaminess of imagination" (e.g. St. Ignatius of Loyola), again, in Osipov's own understanding of the tradition.

It is worth noting, however, that in Roman Catholicism, the practice of spiritual discernment is significant, and saints who experience visions are quite acute in their discernment, and, while discerning the "good fruits" vs. "bad fruits" of miraculous occurrences, the Western tradition unconditionally emphasizes the focus on the Giver and not the gifts. Manuals for the discernment of spiritual gifts are foundational in any training for spiritual direction, with humility being the foundational virtue for all. Saints are also well-known for actively guarding against satanic delusion. St. Padre Pio, for example, was known for asking the Virgin Mary to show her foot stomping on the serpent's head, as the devil is too proud to show such images as demonic delusions.

Russian philosopher A.F. Losev (1893–1988) analyzes Western spirituality and in particular, visions of St. Angela of Foligno: "That is not a prayer and conversation with God. These are very strong hallucinations on the basis of hysteria i.e. prelest". "Orthodox prayer dwells in the upper part of the heart, not below. Through prayer and ascetic experience it has been learned in the East that nurturing the prayer in some other place in the body is always the result of a delusional state. Catholic erotomania is connected, apparently, with violent excitement and fever at the bottom of the heart".

Another Russian philosopher M.V. Lodyzhenskii (1852–1917) compares Orthodox and Roman Catholic mystics and points at the differences in humility between St. Seraphim of Sarov and St. Francis of Assisi.

New-martyr Mihail Novoselov (1864–1938) compares the teaching of St. Ignatius (Brianchaninov), St. Theophan the Recluse, writings of M.V. Lodyzhenskii and the writings of Roman Catholic mystics.

Prof. A.I. Osipov says that deviations in the Roman Catholic Church started from such things that are rather subtle and not easy to understand for everyone, even for the person who knows the basics of the spiritual life. A.I. Osipov gives an example of his personal misunderstanding. He speaks in one of his lectures about the time when he studied in the Moscow Theological Seminary in 1950-60s. He knew about the book "Imitation of Jesus Christ" by Thomas à Kempis – in Ignatius Brianchaninov's writings, there is a case when a landlord saw his daughter with this book, took it out of her hand and said: "Stop playing in romances with God." And A.I. Osipov took and read the book and did not see anything bad: "Why do they criticize it? It is true, we must imitate Jesus Christ." When he looked into this book again after a long time – he saw prelest everywhere: rapture, exaltation, false love. A.I. Osipov adds: "I did not understand, imagine that! I did not see. The people who just knew it and felt it – they understood. They saw where the falseness is."

Another Orthodox theologian Andrey Kuraev compares several times in his books the Eastern and the Western mystical practices. He says that often religious paths are compared by means of formal dogmatic differences – but that is not the most important part. In his opinion, the most important difference between Orthodoxy and Catholicism is the practice of meditative prayer. He writes that "Western spiritual authorities strongly recommend that way of spiritual practice, which the spiritual teachers of the East categorically prohibit (plus, since the time of the unity of the Church). The Eastern tradition allows, though with the utmost caution, the acceptance of an image in the mind - but in no case during prayer. 'How to imagine the Lord? Sitting on the throne or crucified?' - St. Theophan the Recluse answers the question. 'When you contemplate on the Divine, then you can imagine the Lord, if necessary. But you shouldn't keep any images during prayer.' 'If you allow images, then there is a danger - to start praying to a dream'. Not images, but meanings are made the subject of consideration here. 'Imagine the truth and pray about it, or rotate it in your mind during prayer, and compose prayers from it. The moment will come when this truth will enter the heart and embrace the whole being of the soul, nourishing and cheering it up'. <…>This intellectual meditation of Orthodoxy is closer to the Jewish origins of Christianity <…> Too emotional Catholic meditation leads to the fact that the area of the religious itself is invaded by human emotions awakened by it, which have no place in religion (at least – in not transformed form)".
