= Nicetas =

Nicetas or Nikitas or Niketas (Νικήτας) is a Greek given name, meaning "victorious one" (from Nike "victory"). The veneration of martyr saint Nicetas the Goth in the medieval period gave rise to the Slavic forms: Nikita, Mykyta and Mikita

== People with the name Nicetas ==
- Nicetes (or Nicetas) of Smyrna, late 1st-century Greek sophist and rhetorician, see Second Sophistic
- Nicetas of Remesiana, 4th-century bishop of the Dacians, now the patron saint of Romania
- Nicetas the Goth, 4th-century martyr
- Nicetas (Bishop of Aquileia), mid-5th-century archbishop of Aquileia
- Nicetas (cousin of Heraclius), early 7th-century Byzantine general
- Niketas the Persian, 7th-century Byzantine officer
- Nicetas Scutariota, a Byzantine writer from Scutari (modern Üsküdar)
- Niketas (son of Artabasdos), mid-8th-century Byzantine general
- Nicetas of Medikion (Nicetas the Confessor, fl. 783 – 824), Byzantine monk and hegumenos
- Nicetas the Patrician (Nicetas Monomachos, c. 761 – 836), Byzantine eunuch official and monk, opponent of Iconoclasm
- Niketas Byzantios, ninth century, Byzantine theologian, school of Photius, wrote on Islam
- Niketas Ooryphas (fl. 860 – 873), Byzantine official, patrician and admiral
- Niketas (son of Ioube) (fl. 912), Byzantine general and governor
- Nicetas of Heraclea, 11th-century Greek catenist
- Nicetas Eugenianus, Byzantine Greek author of Drosilla and Charicles, see Jean François Boissonade de Fontarabie
- Nicetas of Novgorod (fl. 1095 – 1108), saint and Bishop of Novgorod
- Nicetas Serron, archbishop of Serres and afterwards of Heraclea, and writer. Around 11th century
- Nicetas of Nicomedia, 12th-century archbishop
- Nicetas of Chonae, 12th-century bishop in Byzantine Anatolia
- Nicetas Thessalonicensis, archbishop of Thessalonica and writer, around 1200
- Nicetas (Bogomil bishop) (papa Nicetas), 12th-century bishop of Constantinople
- Niketas Choniates (c. 1155 – c. 1215), Byzantine historian
- Niketas Scholares (fl. 1341 – 1361), Byzantine Greek military leader
- Nicetas I of Constantinople (fl. 766 – 780), Ecumenical Patriarch of Constantinople
- Nicetas II of Constantinople (fl. 1186 – 1189), Ecumenical Patriarch of Constantinople
- Niketas Stethatos (Nicetas Pectoratus, c. 1005 – c. 1090), Byzantine mystic and theologian
- Nicetas of Naupactus, see Minuscule 886
- Nikon Nizetas, cover name of WW1 spy Alfred Redl

== See also ==
- Anicetus (disambiguation)
- Nikita (disambiguation)
- Victor (name)
