= 1000th anniversary of the Christianization of Rus' =

The 1000th Anniversary of the Christianization of Rus' (1000th anniversary of the Baptism of Rus, Russian: 1000-летие крещения Руси) was an occasion marked by events held in the USSR from May – June 1988, to celebrate the introduction of Christianity to Russia by Prince Vladimir Svyatoslavich in 988. Originally, the celebrations were planned for the church only. However, the anniversary became a statewide event. That this was allowed to occur marked a shift in Soviet policy concerning the church.

== Background ==
On December 23, 1980, the Holy Synod of the Russian Orthodox Church elected to "start preparing for the celebration of the Russian Orthodox Church of the forthcoming Great Jubilee." A Jubilee Committee, chaired by Patriarch Pimen convened. The committee assumed its task would be confined to the church.

=== Danilov Monastery ===
On May 17, 1983, in Moscow, the buildings of the former Danilov Monastery were officially transferred to the control of the Church. The buildings became the domain and a "spiritual and administrative center" of the Moscow Patriarchate. This was seen to representing a new change in the attitude of the government to the needs of the Orthodox Church in the USSR. It was the first time a monastic cloister had been returned to the Church in the period since 1930. This generated interest about the upcoming anniversary in the general public. In 1984, there was political obstruction to the establishment of a monastic community at the Danilov monastery. When Konstantin Chernenko, General Secretary of the Communist Party died, the objections ended. In 1986, state policy on religion and the rights of religious citizens was further relaxed. The media was able to report about instances of persecution of religious citizens and the Church, and present the Church as a guardian of national culture and spirituality.

== Organisation ==
The Soviet leadership was ultimately cooperative in the organisation of the celebrations. Bishops met at Novodevichy Convent from 28–31 March 1988. The minutes read,

"Members of the Bishops' Pre-Council Meeting gratefully consider it necessary to note the positive attitude of the Soviet Government to the questions put forward by the Hierarchy of the Church".

On April 29, 1988, at the Kremlin, Mikhail Gorbachev, general secretary of the CPSU (Central Committee) met the Patriarch of Moscow and All Russia, Pimen and the permanent members of the Holy Synod of the Russian Orthodox Church in order to discuss the anniversary. The success of this meeting was a signal to the government and to the people that the anniversary celebrations could be supported and shared. The Kiev Pechersk Lavra, the museums of the Moscow Kremlin, the Svyato-Vvedenskaya Kozelskaya Optina Pustyn Monastery of Kaluga and the cloisters at Yaroslavl were allocated for the use of the Church.

== Celebrations ==
The main anniversary celebrations took place between June 5 and 12, 1988 in Zagorsk and Moscow.

=== Council meeting ===
On June 6, 1988, the 1988 Local council meeting of the Russian Orthodox Church was opened at Trinity Lavra of St. Sergius. It closed on June 9, 1988.

=== Re-opening of Danilov Monastery ===
On June 12, 1988, Church leaders including the Patriarch of Antioch, Ignatius IV, Patriarch of Jerusalem, Diodoros I, Patriarch Pimen, the Catholicos-Patriarch of All Georgia Ilia II, Patriarch Teoctist of Romania, the Patriarch Maxim of Bulgaria and Archbishop of Cyprus Chrysostomos I attended the re-opening of the Danilov Monastery and celebrated with the Divine Liturgy.

=== Local Council and Honouring of Saints ===
June 6 in the Trinity-Sergius Lavra opened the Local Council, which lasted until June 9. Local Council was honoured as the saints Dmitry Donskoy, Andrei Rublev, Maximus the Greek, Metropolitan Macarius of Moscow, Paisius Velichkovsky, Xenia of Saint Petersburg, Ignatius Bryanchaninov, Ambrose of Optina and Theophan the Recluse. At the council also (for the first time since Sobor 1917-1918) discussed many topical issues of church life.

=== Other festivities ===
A gala concert was performed at the Bolshoi. Many activities were broadcast on national television. Celebrations took place in Moscow, Leningrad, Novgorod, Kiev, Vladimir, Minsk and in all the Eparchies of the Russian Orthodox Church. A commemorative 25 ruble coin featuring the monument of Volodymyr the great was minted. An open competition for the design of a new church to commemorate the anniversary was held by the Moscow Patriarchate.

== Boycott by Constantinople ==
The Ecumenical Patriarch of Constantinople, Dimitrios I boycotted the event because of a disagreement over protocol. Instead, on February 28, 1988, Sunday of Orthodoxy, a delegation from Russia, led by Archbishop Kirill of Smolensk and Viazma visited Istanbul.

== Awards ==
On June 3, 1988, by decree of the Presidium of the Supreme Soviet, Patriarch Pimen, Metropolitan of Kiev Philaret (Denisenko), Metropolitan Alexius (Ridiger) of Leningrad, Archbishop Nicholas (Kutepov) of Gorky and Archbishop Alexander (Timofeyev) of Dmitrov were awarded the Order of the Red Banner of Labor. Other Bishops were awarded the Order of Friendship of Peoples.
