= Nikita (given name) =

- Gender: Male
- Language: Russian

Origin
- Meaning: Unconquered
- Region of origin: Greece

Other names
- Variant forms: Mykyta; Nichita

Nikita (Russian: Ники́та [nʲɪˈkʲitə]) is a common masculine name in Eastern Europe and Greece. The Russian variant originated as a Greek name, and subsequently Russian name. The Ukrainian and Belarusian variants are Mykyta (Мики́та [mɪˈkɪtɐ]), and Mikita (Мікіта [mʲiˈkʲita]), respectively (but Nikita (Нiкíта) is also in use in both countries). The Romanian variant is Nichita. The name is derived from the Greek Nicetas (Νικήτας, meaning 'victor'). The Greek name entered Slavic onomastics by way of the veneration of Saint Nicetas the Goth (died 372) in the Russian Orthodox Church.

The Indian feminine name Niketā निकेता, Nikitā निकिता is unrelated. It comes from a Sanskrit word nikita निकेत, niketana निकेतन meaning "house, habitation; temple".

In Japan, it is also written as a phonetic transcription of 仁貴太, 仁記太, 仁希太, and 二貴太.

== Notable people with the name ==
=== Slavic name ===
- Prince Nikita Alexandrovich of Russia (1900–1974), Russian prince and monarchist in exile
- Prince Nikita Romanov (1923–2007), son of Prince Nikita Alexandrovich
- Nikita Khrushchev (1894–1971), Soviet leader
- Nikita Magaloff (1912–1992), Georgian-Russian pianist
- Nikita Bogoslovsky (1913–2004), Soviet composer
- Nikita Sakharov (1915–1945), Soviet Evenk poet
- Nikita Moiseyev (1917–2000), Soviet mathematician
- Nikita Mokin (born 1992), Kazakhstani-Russian ice hockey player
- Nikita Simonyan (1926–2025), Soviet footballer of Armenian descent
- Nikita Isaev (1978–2019), Russian politician, journalist, and anti-corruption and environmental activist
- Nikita Nekrasov (born 1973), Russian-French mathematician and theoretical physicist
- Nikita Borisov (born 1977), Russian-American computer scientist
- Nikita Ramić (born 1993), Serbian-French concert pianist
- Nikita Koloff (born 1959), American wrestler
- Nikita Mikhalkov (born 1945), Russian filmmaker and actor
- Nikita Vitiugov (born 1987), Russian chess player
- Nikita Alekseev (born 1993), Ukrainian singer-songwriter
- Nikita Alexeev (born 1981), Russian ice hockey player
- Nikita Filatov (born 1990), Russian ice hockey player
- Nikita Howarth (born 1998), New Zealand para swimmer
- Nikita Katsalapov (born 1991), Russian ice dancer
- Nikita Koshman (born 2002), Ukrainian fencer
- Nikita Krylov (born 1992), Ukrainian mixed martial arts fighter
- Nikita Kucherov (born 1993), Russian ice hockey player
- Nikita Kuzmin (born 1997), Ukrainian dancer
- Nikita Lytkin (born 1993), Russian serial killer
- Nikita Mazepin (born 1999), Russian Formula 1 driver
- Nikita Nagornyy (born 1997), Russian artistic gymnast
- Nikita Nikitin (born 1986), Russian ice hockey player
- Nikita Rochev (born 1992), Belarusian professional footballer
- Nikita Scherbak (born 1995), Russian ice hockey player
- Nikita Tryamkin (born 1994), Russian ice hockey player
- Nikita Soshnikov (born 1992), Russian ice hockey player
- Nikita Rukavytsya (born 1987), Australian football (soccer) player
- Nikita Zadorov (born 1995), Russian ice hockey player
- Nikita Bedrin (born 2006), Russian racing driver
- Nikita Sheremet (born 2007), Ukrainian swimmer
- Nikita Johnson (born 2008), American racing driver

=== Indian name ===
- Nikita Anand (born 1983), Indian model
- Nikita Thukral (born 1981), South Indian actress
- Nikita Mirzani (born 1986), Indonesian actress
- Nikhita Gandhi (born 1991), Indian playback singer
- Nikita Willy (born 1994), Indonesian actress and pop singer
- Nikita Dutta, Indian actress
- Nikita Gill, Irish-Indian poet
- Nikkita Holder, Canadian track and field athlete
- Nikita Rawal, Indian actress
- Nikita Sharma, Indian actress

=== Other ===
- Nikita Miller (born 1982), Jamaican cricketer
- Nikita Parris (born 1994), English football (soccer) player
- Nykita Joy, American internet celebrity, model, and makeup artist
- Nikita Dragun (born 1996), American Internet personality, make-up artist, and model
- Nikita Nakaoki (中沖 仁希太 born 2004), Japanese handballer

== Pseudonyms ==
- Nikita, former ring name of Katarina Waters, British professional wrestler
- Nikita (swimmer) (born 1947), João Reynaldo Costa Lima Neto, Brazilian swimmer

== Fictional characters ==
- Nikita the Tanner, character in East Slavic folklore
- Nikita, the main character in the 1990 action thriller film La Femme Nikita,
  - The main character in the television series La Femme Nikita, adapted from the above film
  - Nikita Mears, the main character in the television series Nikita, adapted from the above film
- Nikita Dragovich, the main antagonist in Call of Duty: Black Ops
- Nikki (the shortened version of Nikita) is the name of the fourth child of the Singh family in Best of Luck Nikki, the Indian adaptation of Disney's American sitcom Good Luck Charlie
- Nikita Reizner, character in the VOCALOID song series Parties are for Losers

== See also ==
- Mykyta
- Mikita
- Nikita (disambiguation)
- Nikkita
- Nichita
- Nechita
- Nikica
- Nikos
- Nicodemus
- Victor
