= Mykyta =

Mykyta (Ukrainian: Мики́та [mɪˈkɪtɐ]) is a Ukrainian given name, cognate of Belarusian Mikita and Russian Nikita, all originally borrowed from Greek Nicetas (Ancient Greek: Νικήτας). The name Mykyta can be literately translated as unconquerable or victory, i.e., a man who has the capability of winning in every field, a winner.

Notable persons with the name Mykyta include:

- Mykyta Poturayev (born 1970), Ukrainian politician
- Mykyta Burda (born 1995), Ukrainian football defender
- Mykyta Kamenyuka (born 1985), Ukrainian football midfielder
- Mykyta Kravchenko (born 1997), Ukrainian football midfielder
- Mykyta Kryukov (born 1991), Ukrainian football goalkeeper
- Mykyta Nesterenko (born 1991), Ukrainian discus thrower
- Mykyta Polyulyakh (born 1993), Ukrainian football midfielder
- Mykyta Senyk, Ukrainian Paralympic sprinter
- Mykyta Shevchenko (born 1993), Ukrainian football goalkeeper
- Mykyta Tatarkov (born 1995), Ukrainian football striker

== Places ==
- Nikita, a town in Crimea, Ukraine
- Mikita, a village in Estonia

== See also ==
- Mykyta the Fox, a Ukrainian animated series
- Mykyta the Tanner, an east Slavic folk hero
- Mikita
- Nikita (disambiguation)
