= Mikita =

Mikita is a Belarusian given name, cognate of Ukrainian Mykyta and Russian Nikita, all originally borrowed from Greek Nicetas.

== People with the given name ==
- Mikita Brottman (born 1966), British scholar, psychoanalyst, author and cultural critic
- Mikita Bukatkin (born 1988), Belarusian footballer
- Mikita Shuhunkow (born 1992), Belarusian footballer
- Mikita Tsirkun (born 1997), Belarusian sailor
- Mikita Tsmyh (born 1997), Belarusian swimmer

== People with the surname ==
- Andy Mikita, Canadian television director and producer
- Patryk Mikita (born 1993), Polish footballer
- Stan Mikita (1940–2018), Slovak-Canadian ice hockey player

== Places ==
- Mikita, Rõuge Parish, village in Estonia
- Mikita was former name of Rogosi-Mikita, village in Estonia

== See also ==
- Mykyta
- Nikita (disambiguation)
