= Discernment of spirits =

Term used in Christian theology

Discernment of spirits is a term used in Catholic, Eastern Orthodox, and Charismatic Christian theology to judge the influence of various spiritual agents on a person's morality. These agents are:

1. from within the human soul itself, known as concupiscence (considered evil)
2. Divine Grace (considered good)
3. Angels (considered good)
4. Devils (considered evil)

Discernment of spirits is considered necessary to discern the cause of a given impulse. Although some people are regarded as having a special gift to discern the causes of an impulse intuitively, most people are held to require study and reflection, and possibly the direction of others, in the discernment of spirits.

Judgment of discernment can be made in two ways. The first is by a charism or spiritual gift, held as divinely granted to certain individuals for the discerning of spirits by intuition (1 Corinthians 12:10). The second way to discern spirits is by reflection and theological study. This second method is by acquired human knowledge; however, it is always gained "with the assistance of grace, by the reading of the Holy Bible, of works on theology and asceticism, of autobiographies, and the correspondence of the most distinguished ascetics".

== Orthodox views ==
Paul the Apostle mentions the gift of discerning of spirits in 1 Corinthians 12:10. John Chrysostom, in his interpretation of this passage, says that these words mean the ability to tell who is spiritual and who is not, who is a prophet and who is not, as Paul wrote at the time of many false prophets. Ephrem the Syrian, in the interpretation of the same passage, stated that the gift of discerning of spirits is good management of the church.

In everyday life, the most often needed kind of discernment of spirits is discernment of thoughts (if the person analyzes their thoughts at all). Besides thoughts, discernment of spirits can be applied to the judgment of such phenomena as dreams, visions, miracles, prophecies, and other supernatural gifts.

In an ideal case, the main tool of discernment could be the person's conscience; however, in the Orthodox view, that relates only to the people of holy life. Hilarion of Optina writes: "To the question of yours, whether your conscience can accurately show you your errors, I will answer this way - you should not trust your conscience much, because it has not yet been cleansed as it should". Because of this perversion of the conscience, basic discernment of good and evil is helped through reading of the Bible and its interpretation from the Holy Fathers. Further discernment is described in such books as Philokalia (a collection of writings of Holy Fathers), The Ladder of Divine Ascent by John Climacus, and "Letters" by Barsanuphius and John the Prophet. Theophan the Recluse writes: "whoever wants to know more precisely what the discernment of thoughts is, let him read the book of answers of Barsanuphius and John, the clairvoyant recluses. Concerning every deed, the thoughts can double and triple - what should be done? If a passionate thought appeared as it is in comparison with a passionless one, then it would be easy to determine; but usually with someone who has begun to pay attention to himself, passionate thoughts are not in their form, but always under specious cover. Therefore, there is always a danger of acting as if for good, and yet it will be out of passion. In the mentioned book all sorts of cases are discussed by the enlightened mind of the clairvoyant elders; it presents a detailed science of how to guess the fate of God's truth in this regard". In another place: "read [the writings of] Macarius the Great and especially the Ladder where it is said a lot about discernment of thoughts."

According to John of Damascus, the virtue of discernment "is greater than any other virtue; and is the queen and crown of all the virtues".

The key to discernment is humility, as well as its two manifestations: consulting with others and praying about every decision a person could take: "Discrimination is born of humility. On its possessor it confers spiritual insight, as both Moses and St John Climacus say: such a man foresees the hidden designs of the enemy and foils them before they are put into operation. It is as David states: 'And my eyes looked down upon my enemies' (Ps. 14:7. LXX).[...] If you have not received this gift you should not think, say or do anything without consulting others about it, and without a basis of firm faith and pure prayer. Without such faith and such prayer you will never truly achieve discrimination".

John Cassian writes in "Conferences" that discernment "is only secured by true humility. And of this humility the first proof is given by reserving everything (not only what you do but also what you think), for the scrutiny of the elders, so as not to trust at all in your own judgment but to acquiesce in their decisions in all points, and to acknowledge what ought to be considered good or bad by their traditions". Also, "all extremes are equally harmful".

The Bible confirms the importance of counsel: "Ask your father and he will tell you, your elders, and they will explain to you" (Deuteronomy 32:7); "Where there is strife, there is pride, but wisdom is found in those who take advice" (Proverbs 13:10); "Plans fail for lack of counsel, but with many advisers they succeed" (Proverbs 15:22); "Plans are established by seeking advice; so if you wage war, obtain guidance" (Proverbs 20:18); "Surely you need guidance to wage war, and victory is won through many advisers" (Proverbs 24:6); "Gold and silver provide security, but good advice is better" (Sirach 40:25); "If you find someone with understanding, get up early to call on him; wear out his doorstep with your visits" (Sirach 6:36).

John Climacus devoted large chapter of his book to discernment, namely Step 26. In particular, he writes that "those who wish to learn the will of the Lord must first mortify their own will. Then, having prayed to God with faith and honest simplicity, and having asked the fathers or even the brothers with humility of heart and no thought of doubt, they should accept their advice as from the mouth of God, even if their advice be contrary to their own view, and even if those consulted are not very spiritual. For God is not unjust, and will not lead astray souls who with faith and innocence humbly submit to the advice and judgment of their neighbour. Even if those who were asked were brute beasts, yet He who speaks is the Immaterial and Invisible One. Those who allow themselves to be guided by this rule without having any doubts are filled with great humility. For if someone expounded his problems on a harp,(Cf. Psalm 48, 4) how much better, do you think, can a rational mind and reasonable soul teach than an inanimate object"; "some of those who were seeking the will of God laid aside all attachments; they submitted to the Lord their own thought about this or that inclination of the soul, I mean whether to perform an action or to resist it; they submitted their mind stripped of its own will to Him, offering fervent prayer for a set number of days. In this way they attained to a knowledge of His will, either through the spiritual Mind spiritually communicating with their mind or through the complete disappearance from their soul of their cherished intention. Others on account of the trouble and distractions which attended their undertaking concluded that these disturbances came from God, according to him who said: We wanted to come to you time and again but Satan hindered us. (Thess 2.18) Others, on the contrary, recognized that their action was pleasing to God from its unexpected success, declaring: God co-operates with everyone who deliberately chooses to do good. He who has obtained God within him through illumination, both in actions requiring haste and in actions allowing of delay, is assured of His will by the second way, only without a definite period of time".

Athanasius of Crete comments on the last phrase that when discerning God's will, the ones who have God in them do not look at the obstacles but look at the God's help in the matter. Also, "in all our actions, the intention must be sought from the Lord, whether in those that require haste or in those that require to be postponed. For all actions free from attachment and from all impurity will be imputed to us for good if they have been done especially for the Lord’s sake and not for anyone else, even though these deeds are not entirely good".

Peter of Damascus writes that "everything, however, demands discrimination if it is to be used for the good; without discrimination we are ignorant of the true nature of things"; "one needs to acquire discrimination, either through the humility given by God or through questioning those who possess the gifts of discrimination"; "it is excellent to seek advice about everything, but only from those with experience. It is dangerous to ask questions the inexperienced, because they do not possess discrimination".

Nilus of Sora thought that the most important and a great achievement in the spiritual warfare is to find an undeluded mentor. Regarding discernment of subtle thoughts he says, following Nilus of Sinai and Hesychius of Jerusalem, that one should cut out all thoughts, both good and evil: the ascetic should keep the mind "deaf and dumb" and keep the heart free of any thought, even if it seemed good; because, from experience, passionate thoughts follow dispassionate ones.

Gregory of Sinai says that "You can tell that a person is undeluded when his actions and judgment are founded on the testimony of divine Scripture, and when he is humble in whatever he has to give his mind to". "If you are presumptuous and follow your own counsel you will readily fall victim to delusion. That is why a hesychast must always keep to the royal (middle) road. For excess in anything easily leads to conceit, and conceit induces self-delusion." Also Gregory gives an important sign of demonic action: "The Holy Fathers teach that whatever enters the heart, whether sensory or spiritual, if the heart doubts and refuses to accept it, is not from God but is sent by the enemy. […] What is of God comes of itself, says St. Isaac, without your knowing even the time of its coming."

Seraphim of Sarov says about reading the Bible that "When a man provides his soul with the word of God, then he is granted the understanding of what is good and what is evil".

There is a connection between true dispassion and true discrimination: "The mark of dispassion is true discrimination; for one who has attained the state of dispassion does all things with discrimination and according to measure and rule". "Without dispassion, however, you cannot achieve the beauty of discrimination".

There are some distinct properties of true and false spirituality: "the devil cannot bring about love either for God or for one's neighbor, or gentleness, or humility, or joy, or peace, or equilibrium in one's thoughts, or hatred of the world, or spiritual repose, or desire for celestial things; nor can he quell passions and sensual pleasure. These things are clearly the workings of grace. For the fruits of the Spirit are love, joy, peace, and so on (cf. Gal. 5:22), while the devil is most apt and powerful in promoting vanity and haughtiness".

Abba Dorotheos says that "in every task you are given, even one that is extremely necessary and demands diligence, I do not wish that you should do anything with arguments or disturbances; but be sure that every work that you do, be it great or small, as we have said, is one eighth of what is sought. But to preserve one's state of soul, even at the expense of not doing the work at all, is three parts and a half".

Theophan the Recluse writes: "if the thought does not have anything bad neither in itself nor in the consequences, one still should not immediately accept it, but have patience not to become reckless. Some people waited for 5 years and did not execute the thought. The main law is: not to trust own mind and heart and verify every thought with the director. The violation of this rule always was and is the reason of great falls and delusions."

Barsanuphius the Great writes in "Letters" that in order to become spiritual and be able to discern, the person should put away not only sins but natural desires as well (Letter 124). That is, the very topic is for the ones with high measures. Otherwise, there is a danger of being ridiculed and deceived by the demons. Only after such preface, Barsanuphius writes: "do nothing without counsel"(Cf. Sir 32.19) even if it appears to be good to you; for the light of the demons is later revealed as darkness. If, then, you hear or think or see something, with the slightest turmoil in your heart, then learn that this comes from the demons". In other words (in Letter 21), "every thought that does not previously possess the calmness of humility is not according to God but is clearly a form of righteousness coming from the left hand. For our Lord comes with calmness, whereas all that comes from the adversary occurs with turmoil and the commotion of wrath; indeed, if they seem to put on "sheep's clothing," you should know that "inwardly, they are ravenous wolves." (Mt 7.15) So they are manifested by their turmoil. For it is said: "You shall know them by their fruits." (Mt 7.16)". When there is nobody to ask, Barsanuphius advises to pray 3 times (for 3 days in a row or, in case of emergency, 3 times in one day (Cf. Mt 26.44)) about every deed we want to know about whether it is from God or from the demons, and observe where the heart inclines, even to the slightest degree. Note that Letter 21 (where Barsanuphius tells how to discern a thought without counsel) was written to abba John who was preparing for hermitic life. That is, discernment without counsel is allowed by Barsanuphius when absolutely necessary because hermits visit people rarely. In another place (Letter 265 of abba Dorotheos) Barsanuphius writes that he prays that God granted abba Dorotheos the gift of discernment, but without heart labor no one gets it (in the Russian translation, it is translated as "pain" or "trouble" instead of "labor").

=== Divine help becomes demonic ===
When someone prays to God, his prayer is executed and he receives help, but at this moment, he feels pride, that is a sign of demonic origin of this help. Barsanuphius says: "when you have been praying and feel that your prayer has been heard, if indeed you are elated, it is clear that yon have neither prayed according to God nor have you received the help of God, but rather the feeling that worked in you was from the demons so that your heart might be elated. For whenever assistance comes from God, the soul is never elated; instead, it is always humbled. The soul will be amazed at how the great mercy of God condescends to show mercy on sinners, who are unworthy and who always irritate him. And that soul offers exceeding thanks to his glorious and ineffable goodness; for he has not handed us what accords with our sins, but rather, in his great forbearance, he shows long-suffering and mercy. And so the soul is no longer elated, but [only trembles] and gives glory."

=== Discernment of night dreams ===
Similar to discernment of thoughts, confusion and turmoil after a night dream is the sign of its demonic origin. Theophan the Recluse writes in a letter: "your night dream should not be trusted already because it confused you." Joseph the Hesychast also writes in a letter about disturbance after demonic dreams: "however, one must be cautious and discerning here, too, my child, and must not believe in dreams, but must recognize whether they are from God or from the demons. But since not everyone has this discernment, one should not believe in them at all. However, dreams from God can be recognized. Sometimes one sees them in deep sleep, other times in a light sleep, as if sleeping but not really sleeping and for a short duration. And when he wakes up, he is full of joy, and his mind meditates on them, and they bring him theoria. For years and years he brings them to mind, and they are unforgettable. On the contrary, dreams from the demons fill the soul with disturbance. When one wakes up and the mind tries to recall them, he is filled with fear, and his heart does not accept them. But even during sleep as he sees them, they are not stationary, but they change into forms and shapes, into places and ways, into actions and movements. From these changes and the disturbance and the unpleasantness, you are able to recognize where they are from. There are also other things proceeding from the imagination and from overeating, but it is not necessary to point them out."

Upon examination of own dreams, one can make a conclusion about personal spiritual state. Maximus the Confessor writes: "once the soul starts to feel its own good health, the images in its dreams are also calm and free from passion." Niketas Stethatos writes: "If your soul hankers after pleasure and material things, you will dream about acquiring possessions and having money, about the female figure and sexual intercourse - all of which leads to the soiling and defilement of soul and body. If you are haunted by images of greed and avarice, you will see money everywhere, will get hold of it, and will make more money by lending it out at interest and storing the proceeds in the bank, and you will be condemned for your callousness. If you are hottempered and vicious, images of poisonous snakes and wild beasts will plague you and overwhelm you with terror. If you are fall of self-esteem, you will dream of popular acclaim and mass-meetings, government posts and high office; and even when awake you will imagine that these things, which as yet you lack, are already yours, or soon will be. If you are proud and pretentious, you will see yourself being carried along in a splendid coach and even sometimes airborne, while everyone trembles at your great power. Similarly, if you are devoted to God, diligent in the practice of the virtues, scrupulous in the struggle for holiness and with a soul purged of material preoccupations, you will see in sleep the outcome of events and awe-inspiring visions will be disclosed to you. When you wake from sleep you will always find yourself praying with compunction and in a peaceful state of soul and body, and there will be tears on your cheeks, and on your lips words addressed to God."

Ambrose of Optina says that it is better not to believe night dreams at all: if one will believe dreams, he can go completely mad.

=== Properties of true miracles ===
Cleopa Ilie writes in his book On dreams and visions that true miracles must:

- be worthy of the name of God and must be contained in the Holy Scriptures and Holy Tradition;
- be accomplished by the means by which the Savior and His saints performed miracles;
- not deny each other and do not oppose one to the other;
- not contradict the Scripture and Sacred Tradition;
- have the salvation of the human soul as the goal;
- provide benefit for and promote spiritual life, not death and sin.

The one who performs true miracles must:

- tell only the truth, lead a blameless life and not pursue personal interests and selfish goals;
- correct the morals of those who see a miracle and
- give these people the confidence and power of the Spirit of God;
- testify of the work of God's Providence.

=== Three renunciations ===
Holy Fathers write that it is impossible to receive the gift of discernment without "three renunciations": separation from the world, inner fight with passions, acquisition of prayer and deep spiritual knowledge. Evagrius writes: "it is impossible to receive knowledge without having made the first, second, and third renunciation[s]. The first renunciation is to voluntarily leave all worldly things for the knowledge of God; the second is the casting aside of evil which occurs through the grace of Christ our Savior and the zeal of the human person; the third renunciation is separation from ignorance concerning those things that are naturally manifested to people in accordance with their state." Other Fathers specify the renunciations differently, but this is not a contradiction but a supplement. John Cassian writes: "The first is that by which as far as the body is concerned we make light of all the wealth and goods of this world; the second, that by which we reject the fashions and vices and former affections of soul and flesh; the third, that by which we detach our soul from all present and visible things, and contemplate only things to come, and set our heart on what is invisible." John Climacus writes: "no one can enter crowned into the heavenly bridechamber without first making the three renunciations. He has to turn away from worldly concerns, from men, from family; he must cut selfishness away; and thirdly, he must rebuff the vanity that follows obedience."

=== Cases of right and wrong discernment ===
When something demonic is accepted as Divine, i.e. when there is an error in discernment of spirits, this may result in spiritual delusion because the latter by the definition of Ignatius (Brianchaninov) is "man’s assimilation of falsehood which he accepts as truth". The degree of delusion is the degree of such assimilation. There are many stories in the lives of the saints when people were deceived by false visions of the demons in the form of Lord Jesus and Angels (2 Cor 11:14). For example, Nicetas of Novgorod. In the early life, he was deluded by an "angel" as if being sent to help him after he recklessly attempted the feat of seclusion. Due to lack of humility and discernment, Nicetas took this appearance for a true Angel and obeyed him. The "angel" started to pray instead of Nicetas and told him only to read books and give advice to people visiting him and not to pray. He started to prophesy for the visitors and became a known seer. Instead, the elders of the monastery had enough discernment and noticed that in conversations, the recluse cited only the Old Testament and never the New Testament. So they understand that Nicetas was in delusion. They cast the "angel" away and gradually Nicetas got healed, gained humility and later was made a bishop.

Symeon the Stylite was deluded by demons who showed him a chariot wanting to take him to Heaven as it was with Prophet Elias. Due to lack of discernment, Symeon decided to enter the chariot. But before, he made the sign of the Cross and the chariot disappeared.

When Pachomius the Great was living in solitude, the Devil appeared in front of him as "Christ" and said: "Greetings, Pachomius, I am Christ paying you a visit, my faithful friend." But Pachomius was in turmoil and had confusing thoughts. Using discernment, he understood the delusion and rejected the vision: "Devil, depart from me, cursed are you and your visions and your insidious arts. You have no place among the servants of God."

== Ignatian view (Roman Catholic) ==
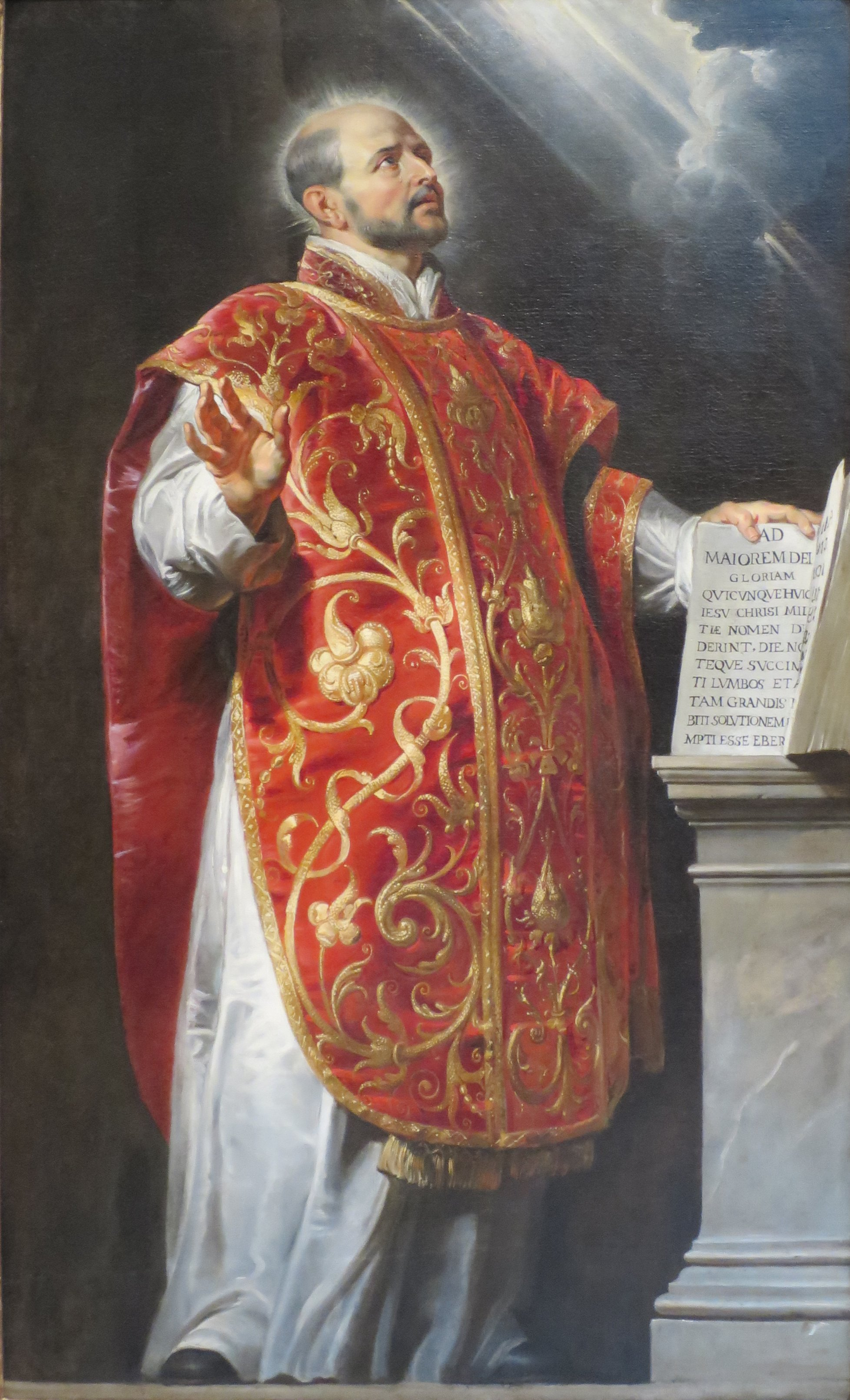
Ignatius of Loyola according to Peter Paul Rubens

For Ignatius of Loyola, there are two signs to judge: evil spirits act on the imagination and the senses, and the good spirit, upon reason and conscience. Then, they can be judged by their mode of action and by the end they seek.

The discernment of spirits is part of everyone's spiritual journey. No one who is trying to make spiritual progress should attempt to do so alone – a spiritual director is required. A director assists a Christian in examining the motives, desires, consolations, and desolations in one's life. Objectively, one can know what is right from looking at the Ten Commandments and the Seven Deadly Sins in a thorough examination of conscience.

A Christian should, according to Ignatius, share everything with a director who can see things objectively, without being swayed by the emotions or passion. Discerning whether the good spirit (the influence of God, the church, one's soul) or the bad spirit (the influence of Satan, the world, the flesh) is at work requires calm, rational reflection. The good spirit brings us to peaceful, joyful decisions. The bad spirit often brings one to make quick, emotional, conflicted decisions. A spiritual director can assist both by personal experience, listening with care, and giving an objective analysis. Ignatius lays out his 23 rules for the discernment of spirits in his Spiritual Exercises for those who direct others through retreats.

== Pentecostal and Charismatic view ==
Discernment of spirits is particularly important among Pentecostal and Charismatic Christians because of their emphasis on the operation of all the spiritual gifts within their churches. It becomes necessary then to be able to determine whether the exercise of a spiritual gift (such as prophecy or an interpretation of tongues) comes from the Holy Spirit, an evil spirit, or merely the human spirit. They believe that every Christian is able to judge and responsible for judging whether such an occurrence is helpful and edifying to the church; however, they also believe that there are those individuals who have been given the spiritual gift of discerning of spirits by the power of the Holy Spirit. The discerning of spirits does not involve the judging of people. The gift of discerning of spirits is also believed to be necessary in distinguishing demonic possession from mental or physical illness.

Additionally, many Charismatics and those in Pentecostal churches believe that the gift of discernment of spirits allows certain individuals to see spirits. The story about Elisha and the host of angels (cf. 2 Kings 6:15-17) is given as an example along with many other modern examples in the book School of the Seers by Jonathan Welton.

== See also ==
- Demonology
- Spiritual warfare
