= Novitiate =

Period of training and preparation that a Christian novice undergoes

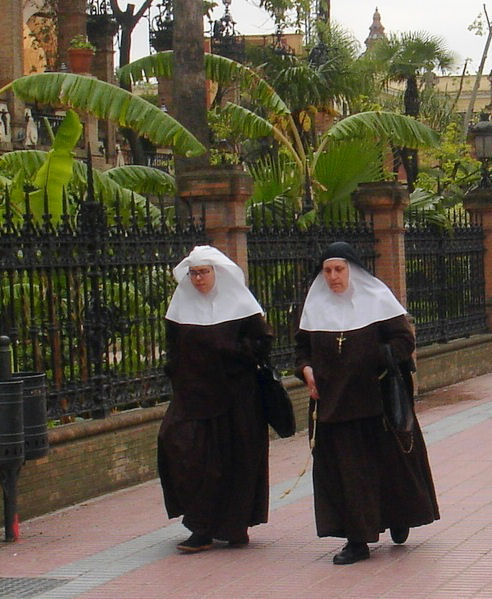
A novice is at the left. The habit of a novice often differs from that of the full professed sisters.

The novitiate, also called the noviciate, is the period of training and preparation that a Christian novice (or prospective) monastic, apostolic, or member of a religious order undergoes prior to taking vows in order to discern whether they are called to vowed religious life. It often includes times of intense study, prayer, living in community, studying the vowed life, deepening one's relationship with God, and deepening one's self-awareness. In the Catholic Church, the canonical time of the novitiate is one year; in case of additional length, it must not be extended beyond two years. In religious communities belonging to the Evangelical-Lutheran Churches, the duration of the novitiate depends on the specific Evangelical-Lutheran monastery or convent; for example, for the Sisters of St. Francis at Klaradals Convent, the time spent as a novice is typically two to three years. In the Eastern Orthodox Church, the novitiate is officially set at three years before one may be tonsured a monk or nun, though this requirement may be waived. The novitiate is in any case a time both for the novice to get to know the community and the community to get to know the novice. The novice should aspire to deepening their relationship to God and discovering the community's charism. The novitiate in many communities includes a concentrated program of prayer, study, reflection and limited ministerial engagement.

The novitiate, through which life in an institute is begun, is arranged so that the novices better understand their divine vocation, and indeed one which is proper to the institute, experience the manner of living of the institute, and form their mind and heart in its spirit, and so that their intention and suitability are tested.

—CIC, can. 646

In some novitiate communities, mostly monastic, the novice wears clothing that is distinct from secular dress but is not the full habit worn by professed members of the community. The novices' day normally includes participation in the canonical hours, manual labor, and classes about the religious life. Spiritual exercises and tests of humility are common features.

A superior should ideally appoint an experienced member of the community to serve as novice master or mistress.

Different religious communities have varying requirements for the duration of the novitiate. The novice must complete a postulancy before being admitted to the novitiate, the duration of which can be short or extend up to three years.

A novice is free to leave the novitiate at any time and in most communities, the superiors are free to dismiss them with or without cause. At the end of the novitiate, the novices are either admitted to temporary vows or asked to leave. The binding, life-long commitment to consecrated life comes at a later point.

The term novitiate also refers to the building, house, or complex devoted to the novices' cells or dormitory and other needs, such as study and education.
