= Nikkita =

Nikkita is a given name. Notable people with the name include:

- Nikkita Fountain (born 1984), Bahamian tennis player
- Nikkita Holder (born 1987), Canadian track and field athlete
- Nikkita Lyons (born 1999), ring name of American professional wrestler Faith Jefferies
- Nikkita Oliver, American lawyer and political candidate
- Nikkita Persaud (born 1990), Canadian-born Guyanese footballer

== See also ==
- Nikita (given name)
