= Nichita =

Nichita is a Romanian-language masculine given name and surname. Notable persons with that name include:

- Nichita Danilov (born 1952), Romanian poet
- Nichita Iurașco (born 1999), Moldovan footballer
- Nichita Moțpan (born 2001), Moldovan footballer
- Nichita Smochină (1894–1980), Russian-Romanian activist, scholar and political figure
- Nichita Stănescu (1933–1983), Romanian poet and essayist

== Surname ==
- Gheorghe Nichita (born 1956), Romanian politician
- Mirela Nichita-Paşca (born 1985), Romanian handballer

== See also ==
- Nechita
- Nikita (given name)
