= Nikita Ramic =

French concert pianist

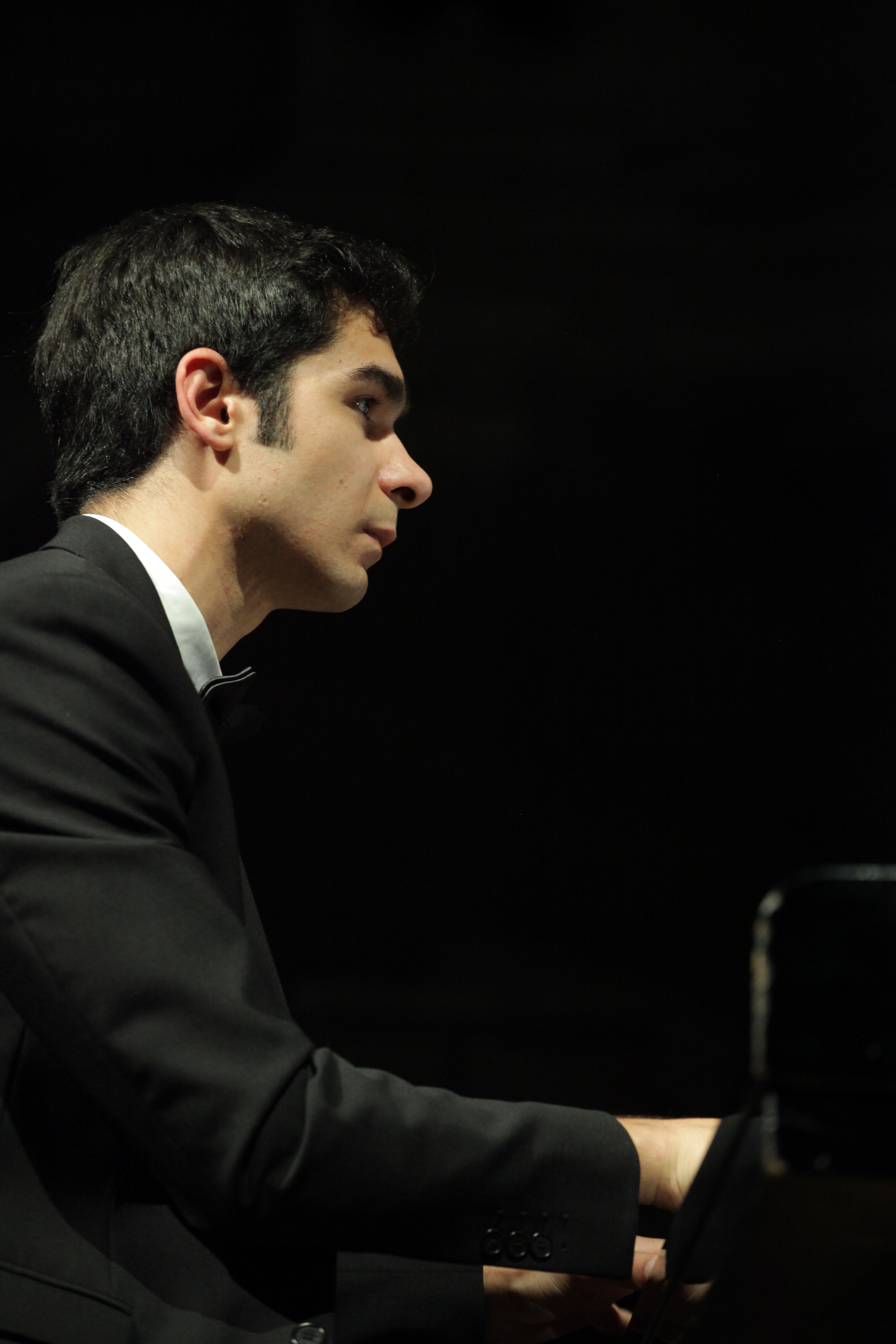
- Nikita Ramic performing at the Salle Gaveau, 2018
- Born: 23 August 1993 (age 32); Vranje
- Occupation: Classical pianist
- Website: nikitaramic.com

Nikita Ramic (born 23 August 1993) is a French concert pianist.

== Biography ==
Nikita Ramic was born in Vranje, Serbia to a family that has cultivated a long musical tradition. He grew up in a family of artists and began studying the piano at the age of three thanks to the teaching of his pianist mother, a student of Evgeny Lieberman (himself a student of the legendary pedagogue Heinrich Neuhaus). His father, a virtuoso, obtained the first prize for accordion at the Concours International de Venise in 1984.

With his family, Nikita Ramic left Serbia for France and enrolled at the Conservatoire de Rueil-Malmaison, in Denis Pascal's class. At the age of 16, after obtaining three first prizes, Nikita Ramic went on to study with Henri Barda at the Conservatoire Alfred Cortot in Paris, with a scholarship from the Fondation Zaleski. At the same time he studied with Lilya Zilberstein in Weimar and at the Chigiana music academy in Siena, Italy.

In Paris he has performed at the Salle Gaveau, Bal Blomet, Salle Cortot, Palais Iéna, and Centre Rachi-Guy de Rothschild. He performed Saint-Saëns’ 5th Concerto with orchestra at the 4th Arrondissement City Hall. In Lyon he gave a recital at the Salle Molière. He also played at a concert for perfumer Jean-Paul Guerlain’s birthday. Nikita Ramic gave a live performance for Cally Spooner’s Lafayette Anticipation artistic project, and played "Faisons de l’Inconnu un allié" during the entire exhibition. At the end of this partnership, he recorded a contemporary piece which the Fondation d’entreprise Galeries Lafayette presented to the FIAC 2016. That same year, Nikita Ramic performed Franz Liszt’s 12 Transcendental Etudes in Versailles. In 2016 Nikita Ramic performed in a recital at Palazzo Chigi Saracini in Siena and gave a series of concerts in Serbia (Belgrade, Vranje and Nis). In 2017 Nikita Ramic performed in concerts for the charitable organization "les Virtuoses du Coeur" and in other concerts across France. The 38èmes Estives Musicales Internationales de Louvie-Juzon invited him to play Beethoven’s Symphonies for two pianos with his brother. Sometimes Nikita Ramic chooses to give concerts in atypical locations, in particular in several universities where he enjoys meeting a new audience. His first disc RHAPSODE dedicated to the works of Franz Liszt (Angara Mic / InOuie Distribution) has received special mention by critics and in the press.

Nikita Ramic frequently performs in France, the Netherlands, Serbia, Russia, Germany and Italy.

== Discography ==
- Franz Liszt, Rhapsode : Hungarian Rhapsodies, Angara Mic (2018)
- Bizet, Grieg, Borodin, Rachmaninoff, Gounod, Brahms, Dvořák, Mendelssohn, Bach, Schubert, MOMENTS : Transcriptions for piano, Angara Mic (2021)
