= Nechita =

Nechita is a surname. Notable persons with that name include:

- Andrei Nechita (born 1988), Romanian cyclist
- Adriana Nechita (born 1983), Romanian handballer
- Alexandra Nechita (born 1985), Romanian-American painter and philanthropist
- Mihai Nechita (born 1949), Romanian painter

== See also ==
- Nichita
