= Discernment (Christianity) =

Ability to obtain sharp perceptions

In Christianity, discernment is the ability to obtain sharp perceptions or to judge well (or the activity of so doing). In the case of judgment, discernment can be psychological, moral, or aesthetic in nature.

Discernment has also been defined in these contexts: scientific (discerning what is true about the real world), normative (discerning value including what ought to be), and formal (deductive reasoning). The process of discernment, within judgment, involves going past the mere perception of something and making nuanced judgments about its properties or qualities.

Discernment in the Christian religion is considered a virtue and a lifelong task, a discerning individual is considered to possess wisdom and be of good judgment through a profound spiritual alignment and engagement; especially so with regard to subject matter often overlooked by others.

== Christianity ==
In Christianity, the word may have several meanings. Discernment can describe the process of determining God's desire in a situation or for one's life, or identifying the true nature of a thing, such as discerning whether a thing is good, evil, or may even transcend such a limiting notion of duality. It also describes the interior search for an answer to the question of one's vocation, specifically, whether or not God is calling one to the married life, single life, consecrated life, ordained ministry or any other calling.

"Discernment of spirits" is a term used in both Roman Catholic and Charismatic (Pentecostal) Christian theology to indicate judging various spiritual agents for their moral influence.

== Process of discernment ==
The process of achieving a level of discernment takes place in steps. The following actions can be made in the course of discernment: taking time in making decisions, using both the head and heart, and assessing important values involved in the situation.

Time has been considered necessary in the process of making a smart choice; decisions made in a hurry can be altered by lack of contemplation. When time is available to assess the situation this improves the discernment process. When time allows, a tentative decision can be revisited and other people can be consulted to make sure that the person is satisfied with their choice.

Deciding and discerning each require both the "head" and the "heart". To make a decision with the "head" one must first reflect on the situation and emphasize the rational aspect of the decision making process. To make a decision with the "heart" one must decide based on feelings as well as rationality.

Values in the discernment process are weighing options that determine what is most important to the person. Everyone’s value system is different which affects each person's discernment process.

=== Group discernment ===
Group discernment is a separate branch of discernment. In group discernment each person in the group must first undergo their own discernment process. That person must keep in mind what is best for the group as well as themself when making a decision. The same guiding principles (of values, using the head and heart, and ample time) all still apply in group discernment. Group discernment is different because it requires multiple people to have a unanimous decision in order to move forward. Group discernment requires discussion and persuasion between people to arrive at a decision.

== Christian spiritual discernment ==
Christian spiritual discernment is distinct from secular types of discernment because every decision is to be made in accordance with what is perceived to be God's will. The fundamental definition of Christian discernment is a decision-making process in which an individual makes a discovery that can lead to future action. People who practise this believe that in the process of Christian spiritual discernment God guides the individual to help them arrive at the best decision. The way to arrive at the best decision in Christian spiritual discernment is to seek out internal external signs of God's action and then apply them to the decision at hand. Christian Discernment also has an emphasis on Jesus, and making decisions that align with those of Jesus in the New Testament. The focus on God and Jesus when making decisions is what separates Christian discernment from secular discernment.

Ignatius of Loyola (1491–1556) is often regarded as the master of the discernment of spirits. The method of "Ignatian discernment" is his technique of Catholic discernment. Ignatian discernment uses a series of Spiritual Exercises for discerning life choices and focuses on noticing God in all aspects of life. The Spiritual Exercises are designed to help people who face a major life decision. There are seven steps of discernment to be followed that include identifying the issue, taking time to pray about the choice, making a wholehearted decision, discussing the choice with a mentor, and then finally trusting the decision made.
