= Alexei Osipov =

Russian Orthodox theologian and professor (born 1938)

- Алексе́й О́сипов
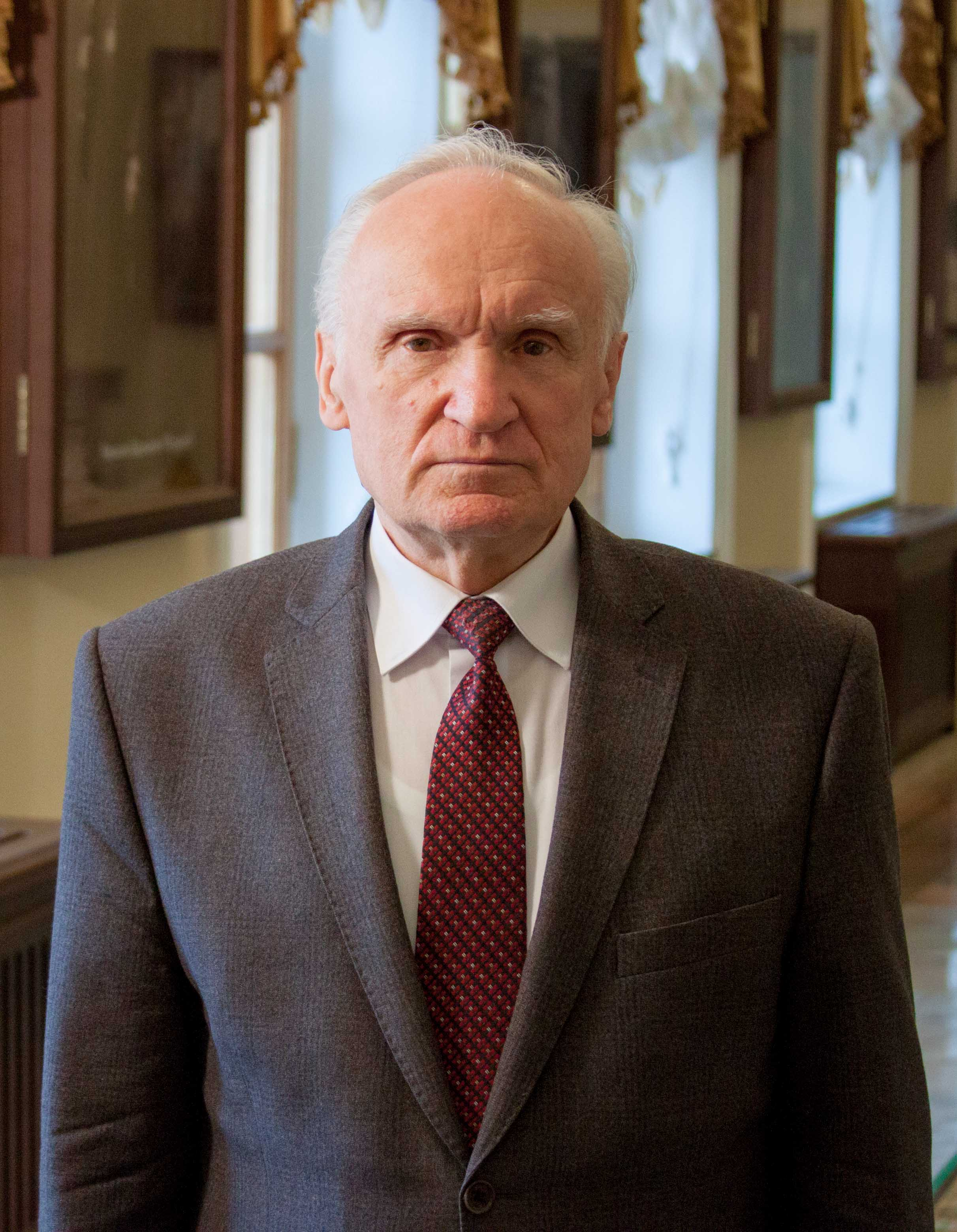
- Osipov in 2015
- Born: March 31, 1938 (age 88); Soviet Union
- Education: Moscow Theological Academy (ThD)
- Honours: Order of Friendship
- Website: http://alexey-osipov.ru/

Signature
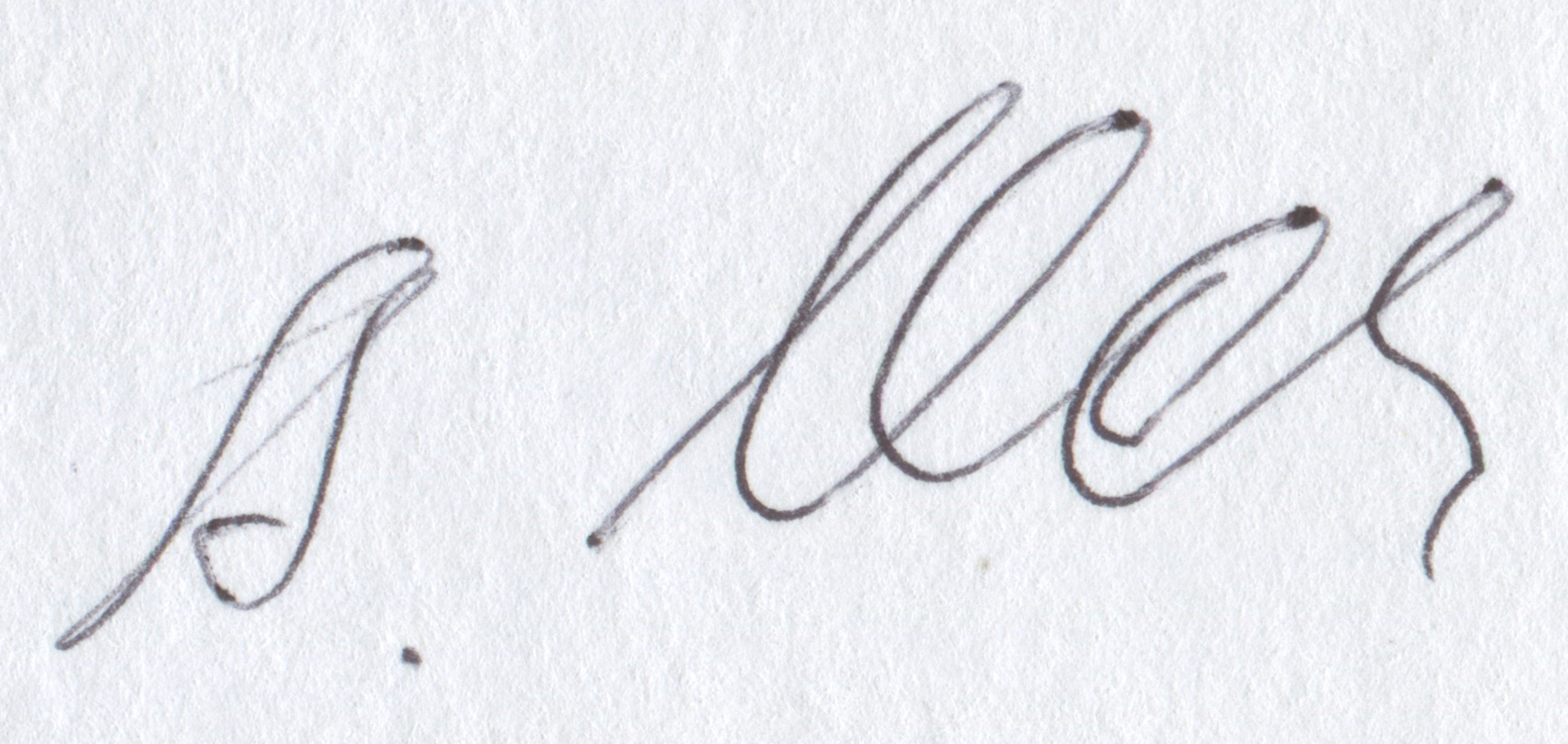

Alexei Ilyich Osipov (Note: In this name that follows East Slavic naming customs, the patronymic is Ilyich and the family name is Osipov.) (Russian: Алексе́й Ильи́ч О́сиповborn, born March 31, 1938) is a Russian Orthodox theologian, writer, and professor at the Moscow Theological Academy. His work focuses on Slavophile thought, Eastern Christian apologetics, and critiques of Roman Catholic theology. He regards Islam as the closest religion to Christianity.

== Early life and education ==
He was born in Belyov, Tula oblast, RSFSR, USSR.

After finishing school he refused to enter any university and in home conditions he undertook the study of theology under the guidance of hegumen Nikon (Vorobyov) for 3 years. In 1958, he entered the 4th (final) grade of Moscow Theological Seminary, having passed exams for the previous three years. Next year he entered Moscow Theological Academy which he finished in 1963. In 1985, he was given a doctorate in theology.

== Career ==
Since 1965 he has been a lecturer of basic theology, and since 1975 a professor.

== Honours ==
- 2017 - Order of Friendship

== Views ==
Osipov opposed the canonization of the Romanovs, saying "[Nicholas] suffered not for his Christian convictions but as a political figure".

=== Views on Islam ===
Osipov posits that Islam is the religion most closely aligned with Сhristianity. According to Osipov:

In essence, the Islamic faith represents an Old Testament religion, albeit one incorporating certain elements of Christianity. In this regard, Islam diverges significantly from Judaism, wherein Christ is viewed as a false messiah, while the messiah anticipated by the Jewish tradition is identified as the Antichrist within Christian eschatology. This highlights a stark theological contrast. The contemporary conflict between Islam and Christianity is artificially instigated. As established in social psychology, public opinion can be easily manipulated against any given group. This mechanism is relatively straightforward and is currently being exploited by unscrupulous ideologists to inflame interreligious and ethnic conflicts. This phenomenon exemplifies the sinister principle of 'unleashing chaos to establish control.'

== Sanctions ==
On January 23, 2023, Osipov was sanctioned by the government of Ukraine as part of a sanctions package against numerous leaders of the Russian Orthodox Church. Ukrainska Pravda reported that Osipov had expressed public support for Russia during its invasion of Ukraine.

== Bibliography ==
in English:

- Downloadable English translation (in Word Doc.) of Osipov´s "Soul´s life after death" (Posmertnaya Zhizn Dushi). Moscow: Danilovskiy Blagovestnik, 2005; 4th edition: Moscow, 2007.
- The search for truth on the path of reason. Moscow: Sretensky Monastery and Pokrov Press, 2009. ISBN 978-0-9842848-0-1

in Russian:

- Translation of the order of Morning and Evening Church services by the Greek service instruction book of 1951 in comparison with Russian synodal edition (manuscript, Library of Moscow Theological Academy).
- The basics of theology (Osnovnoye bogosloviye). Course of lectures for students of Moscow Theological Academy. Moscow, 1994.
- The search for truth on the path of reason. Moscow: Danilovskiy Blagovestnik, 1997.
- Orthodox understanding of the meaning of life. Kyiv, 2001.
- Soul's life after death (Posmertnaya Zhizn Dushi). Moscow: Danilovskiy Blagovestnik, 2005; 4th edition: Moscow, 2007.
