= Ignatius Brianchaninov =

Russian Orthodox saint (1807–1867)

Saint Ignatius Brianchaninov
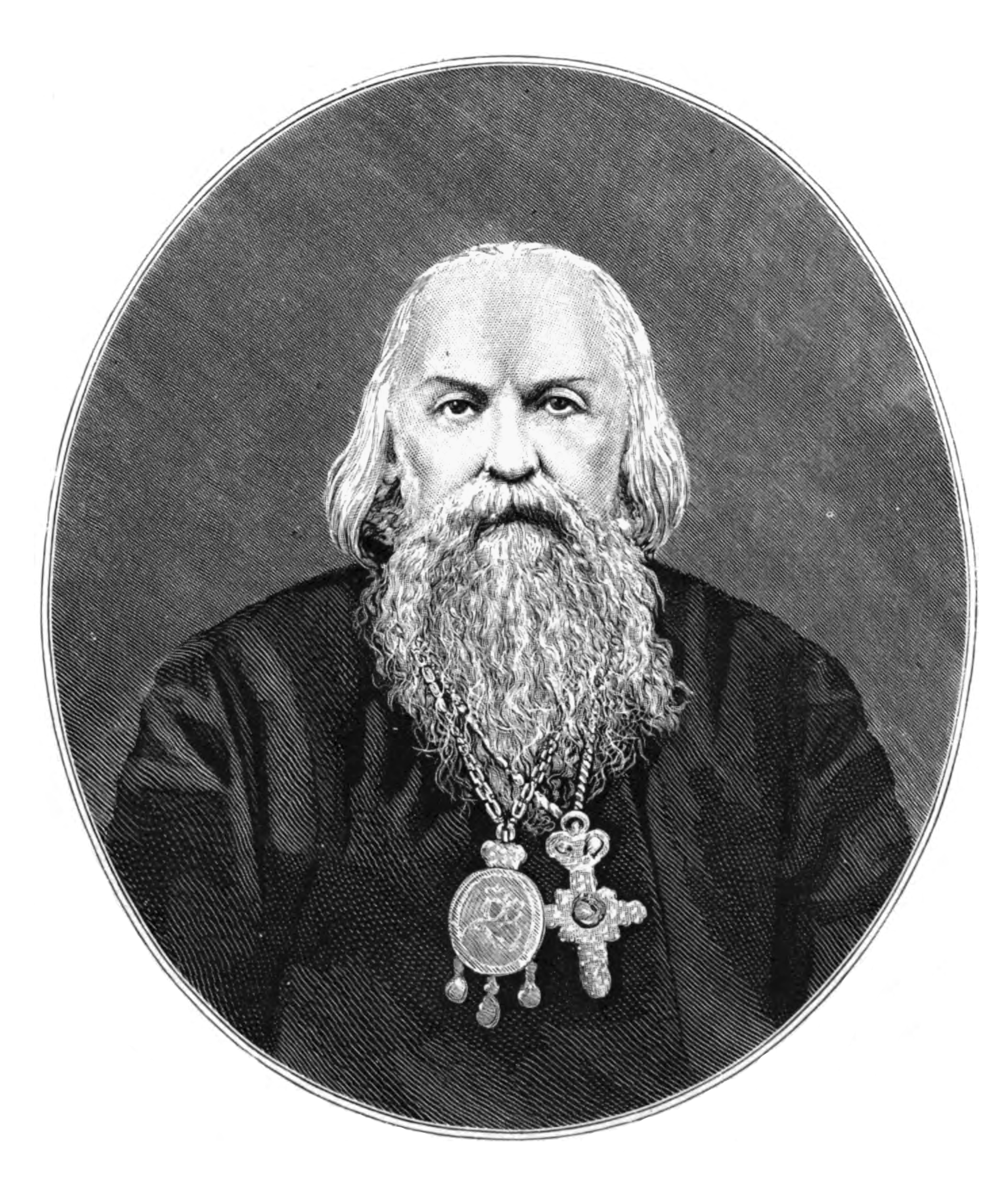
- Ignatius Brianchaninov

Saint, Holy hierarch
- Born: 15 February 1807; Pokrovskoye, Vologda Governorate, Russian Empire
- Died: 30 April 1867 (aged 60); Nicolo-Babaevsky Monastery, Bolshie Soli, Kostroma Governorate
- Venerated in: Eastern Orthodox Church
- Canonized: 6 June 1988, Trinity Lavra of St. Sergius by 1988 Local Council of the Russian Orthodox Church (Patriarch Pimen I of Moscow)
- Major shrine: Tolga Monastery, Yaroslavl
- Feast: April 30
- Attributes: Vested as a bishop

Ignatius Brianchaninov or Ignaty Brianchaninov (born Dmitry Alexandrovich Brianchaninov (Note: In this name that follows East Slavic naming customs, the patronymic is Alexandrovich and the family name is Brianchaninov.); Russian: Дмитрий Александрович Брянчанинов, IPA: [dmʲitrʲɪj ɐlʲɪkˈsandrəvʲɪdʑ brʲɪnʲtɕɪˈnʲinəf]; 15 February 1807 – 30 April 1867) was a bishop and theologian of the Russian Orthodox Church. He stands out as one of the greatest Eastern Orthodox patristic writers of the nineteenth century.

He was glorified (canonized) as a saint by the 1988 meeting of the Local Council of the Russian Orthodox Church. His relics are preserved at the ancient Tolga Monastery on the Volga River near Yaroslavl.

== Life and work ==
Dmitry Bryanchaninov was born in the manor of Pokrovskoye to one of the wealthiest landowning families of the Governorate of Vologda. He was educated at Main Military Engineering School in St. Petersburg.

Although successful in his studies, he was deeply dissatisfied with the lay life and turned to a life of prayer. In 1827 he fell seriously ill and left the army on this ground. He began pursuing a monastic vocation and in 1831 took monastic vows and received the monastic name of Ignatius. He was ordained a priest shortly afterwards. He rose rapidly to the rank of archimandrite and at the age of 26 was appointed superior of the Maritime Monastery of St. Sergius in St. Petersburg. In 1857, Ignatius was consecrated Bishop of the Caucasus and the Black Sea, but he retired only four years later to the Nikolo-Babayevsky Monastery on the Volga to devote himself to spiritual writing.

He wrote a large amount of material, mostly about the spiritual life and prayer. Only a small portion of his writing has been translated into English. Although his writing was intended primarily for monks, his works are highly recommended for lay Christians by leading Orthodox figures such as Thomas Hopko.

== Books ==
Available in English translation:

- The Arena: An Offering to Contemporary Monasticism. Complete works of St. Ignatius Brianchaninov, Vol. V. Brianchaninov, I. Translated by Arch. Lazarus. Holy Trinity Publications, 1997. ISBN 0-88465-011-1
- The Field: Cultivating Salvation. Complete works of St. Ignatius Brianchaninov, Vol. I. Translated by Nicholas Kotar. Holy Trinity Publications, 2016. ISBN 9780884653769
- On the Prayer of Jesus. Brianchaninov, I. Translated by Arch. Lazarus. Ibis Press, 2006. ISBN 0-89254-120-2
- The Refuge: Anchoring the Soul in God. Complete works of St. Ignatius Brianchaninov, Vol. II. Translated by Nicholas Kotar. Holy Trinity Publications, 2019. ISBN 9780884654292
- The Threshold: Trials at the Crossroads of Eternity. Complete works of St. Ignatius Brianchaninov, Vol. III. Translated by Nicholas Kotar. Holy Trinity Publications, 2023. ISBN 9780884654933
- Harbor for Our Hope: On Acquiring Peace Amidst Suffering. Brianchaninov, I. Translated by Elena Borowski. Holy Trinity Publications, 2020. ISBN 9780884654223

== Quotes ==
- He who is careless about prayer is careless about his salvation; he who quits prayer renounces his salvation.
- Worldly people and even monks without spiritual discernment are nearly always attracted by humbugs, imposters, hypocrites and those who are in demonic delusion, and they take them for saints and genuine servants of God.
