= Nicetas of Novgorod =

Monk and hermit

Saint Nicetas of Novgorod
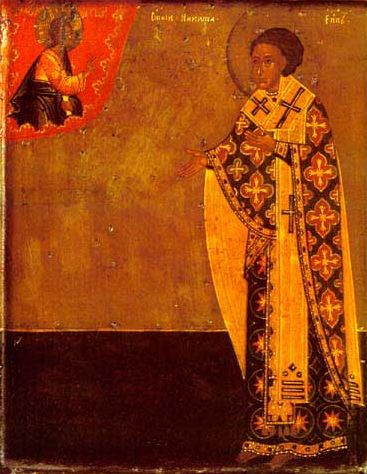
- 17th-century Russian icon

Bishop of Novgorod
- Born: 25 May 1030; Kiev
- Died: 31 January 1108 (aged 77); Novgorod
- Resting place: Cathedral of Saint Sophia, Novgorod
- Venerated in: Catholic Church; Eastern Orthodox Church
- Canonized: 1558
- Feast: 31 January (Catholic Church); 31 January (O.S.); 30 April (O.S.); 14 May (O.S.) (Eastern Orthodox Church)

Nicetas (Note: Russian: Епи́скоп Ники́та; Ukrainian: Єпи́скоп Мики́та.) (also spelled Niketas; 1030–1108) was a monk of the Kiev Pechersk Lavra. Despite the objections of Nikon the Abbot of the Caves, Nicetas embraced the life of a solitary hermit at a young age.

== Spiritual delusion ==
According to tradition, Nicetas was plagued heavily by demonic torments during his time in solitude. The devil appeared to him in the guise of an angel, and the ascetic bowed down to him. The devil gave him advice, and advised the monk not to pray, as the disguised devil would supposedly "pray for him". He stood near the hermit, giving the appearance of praying, falsely reassuring the deceived Nicetas. The hermit came to "surpass everyone in his knowledge of the Books of the Old Testament, but Nicetas would not speak about the Gospel, nor did he wish to hear it read."

The devil would give Nicetas information on what was going on in the world, and the monk would prophesy to people who came to seek his guidance. The elders of the monastery understood that Nicetas was in a state of prelest, and broke into the cave, chased away the demons with their prayers, and dragged the hermit out.

Following this intervention, Nicetas forgot all that he had read in the Old Testament, and forgot how to read at all. Nicetas was taught how to read again, and with the blessings of the elders of the monastery, continued his hermitage; only with the addition of humility.

== Later life ==
Nicetas realized his wrongdoings, and repented from them with great sadness, humility, and fasting. By his humility, it is believed that God blessed Nicetas with the gift of miracle-working.

In 1096, Nicetas was named to the office of Bishop of Novgorod. It is believed that his intercessions contributed to the release of rain during a severe drought, and also a fire in the city was extinguished by his prayers. He reposed on January 31, 1108, with 13 years as a bishop.

== Legacy and veneration ==
In 1558, during the reign of Tsar Ivan Vasilievich, Nicetas was glorified as a saint. In 1956, the relics of Nicetas were transferred by Bishop Sergius (Golubtsov) from the Sophia Cathedral to the Saint Nicholas Cathedral, and when it was closed in 1962, to the Church of the Apostle Philip. In 1993, the relics of Saint Nikita were returned to the St. Sophia Cathedral.

His feast days in the Eastern Orthodox Church are on: 31 January (the day of his repose), 30 April (the day of the Uncovering of his Relics in 1558), and 14 May. These are calculated as 13 February, 13 May, and 27 May, respectively, using the Gregorian calendar. Nicetas is commemorated on 31 January in the Catholic Church.
