= 1988 Local Council of the Russian Orthodox Church =

The 1988 Local Council of the Russian Orthodox Church (Russian: Поместный собор Русской православной церкви 1988 года) was the fourth in modern history of the Russian Orthodox Church. It was held June 6 to 9, 1988 at the Trinity Lavra of St. Sergius in the Refectory Church. It was held in connection with the 1000th anniversary of the Christianization of Rus'. The most important outcome of the council was the adoption of a new charter of the Russian Orthodox Church and the canonization of nine prominent representatives of the Russian Orthodoxy. At the council in 1988, in contrast to the councils in 1945 and 1971, the debate on ecclesiastical order at various levels had been very busy, sometimes acute; often, members of the council expressed diametrically opposed opinions.

== Background ==
The participants of the council had to represent all the bishoprics of the Russian Church, according to the election – two representatives from the clergy and laity of each diocese.
