= Theophan the Recluse =

Russian Orthodox Church saint (1815–1894)

Saint Theophan the Recluse
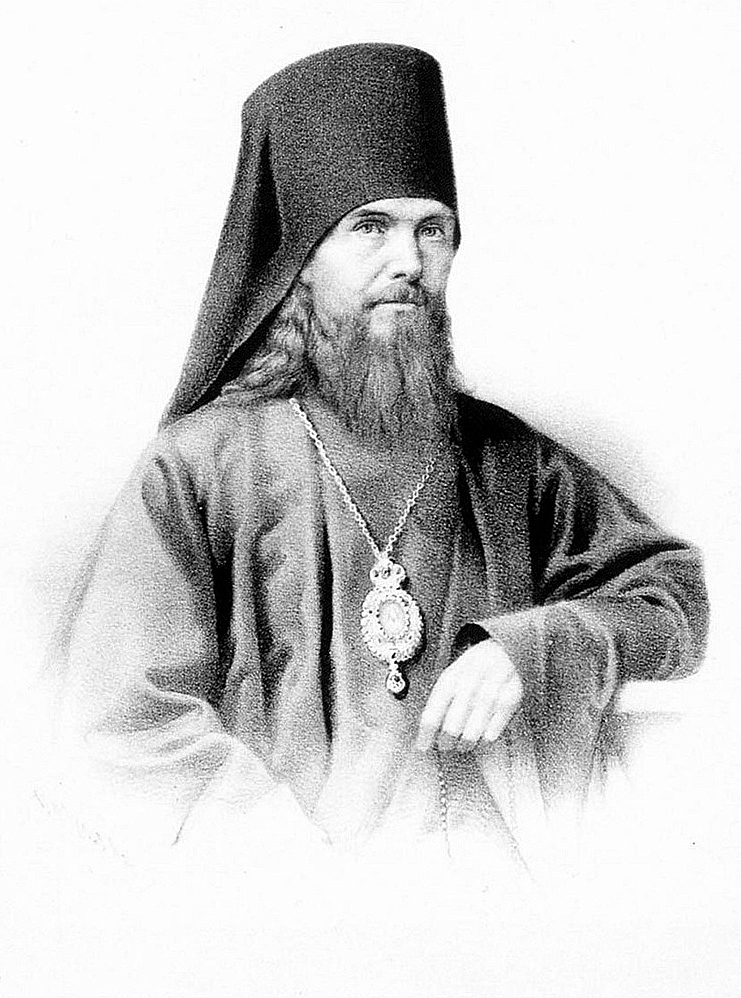
- Theophan depicted in an 1860 lithograph
- Born: January 10, 1815; Chernavsk, Oryol Governorate, Russian Empire
- Died: January 6, 1894 (aged 78); Vysha Monastery, Russian Empire
- Venerated in: Eastern Orthodox Church
- Canonized: 6 June 1988, Trinity Lavra of St. Sergius by the 1988 Local Council of the Russian Orthodox Church (Patriarch Pimen I of Moscow)
- Feast: 29 June; 19 January; 23 January

Theophan the Recluse (Russian: Феофан Затворник, romanized: Feofan Zatvornik), also known as Theophanes the Recluse or the Enlightener Theophan the Recluse of Vysha (Russian: святитель Феофан Затворник Вышенский; January 10, 1815 – January 6, 1894), was a Russian Orthodox bishop and theologian, recognized as a saint in 1988. Born as Georgy Vasilievich Govorov, he became a monk in 1841, taking the name Theophan.

He is best known through the books and letters he wrote concerning spiritual life, especially on the subjects of the Christian life and the training of youth in the faith. He also played an important role in translating the Philokalia from Church Slavonic into Russian. The Philokalia is a classic of Orthodox spirituality, composed of the collected works of a number of Church Fathers which were edited and placed in a four volume set in the 17th and 18th centuries. In his works, a persistent theme was developing an interior life of continuous prayer and learning to "pray without ceasing" as St. Paul teaches in his first letter to the Thessalonians.

== Early life ==
He was born on January 10, 1815, as Georgy Vasilievich Govorov (Russian: Георгий Васильевич Говоров), in the village of Chernavsk, in the Oryol Governorate of the Russian Empire. His father was a Russian Orthodox priest.

In 1823, he was sent to study at the Theological College in Livny. The moral and spiritual beliefs in the school was favorable to him. In 1829, Govorov was found among the best students and was transferred to the Oryol Theological Seminary. At the time, Archimandrite Isidore (Nikolsky) was the rector of the seminary, the philosophical sciences were taught by Evfimy Ostromyslensky and the literature teacher was Hieromonk Platon (Gorodetsky), later Metropolitan of Kiev and Galicia. He found success in his studies, and he began to consciously work on himself. Already at this time, his characteristic feature was a love of seclusion. The seminary bulletin noted that Govorov was distinguished by "a penchant for solitude; edifying in his treatment of comrades; sets an example of diligence and good morals; meek and silent." After graduating from the seminary, considered the best of the pupils of his course, he was sent to the Kiev Theological Academy in 1837.

== Career ==
During his studies in Kiev, in 1838, his mother died, and a year later, his father died as well, influencing Govorov's life. On October 1, 1840, he submitted a petition to the academic authorities for monastic tonsure; at the age of 26, he received monastic tonsure from the rector of the Kiev Theological Academy, Archimandrite Jeremiah Solovyov with the name Theophanes in honor of Theophanes the Confessor. On April 6 of the same year, on the day of his episcopal consecration, Jeremiah ordained him to the office of hierodeacon, and also to the office of hieromonk on July 1 of the same year.

In 1841, Hieromonk Theophan was among the first to graduate from the Academy with a master's degree in theology for a course essay "Review of Sublaw Religion" (Обозрение подзаконной религии), which, being found among the best works, was sent to the Most Holy Synod. Metropolitan Philaret Drozdov of Moscow, a permanent member of the Most Holy Synod, stated in his review: "This work contains so much information and considerations about the law of Moses that they serve as sufficient evidence of the knowledge of the writer, giving him the right to a master's degree." Immediately after graduating from the Academy, Theophan was appointed rector of the Kiev-Sofia Theological College, where he began to teach Latin.

On December 7, 1842, he was appointed an inspector and teacher of psychology and logic at the Novgorod Theological Seminary. He received the degree of Master of Divinity on December 18 of the same year.

On October 16, 1844, he was appointed teacher of the Saint Petersburg Theological Academy in the Department of Moral and Pastoral Theology and Hieromonk Theophan became an assistant inspector of the Academy from March 22, 1845. On July 3, 1845, he was appointed as a member of the committee to review the summaries of academic subjects taught at the seminary.

At this time, he was interested a solitary monastic life; in a letter to his spiritual father Jeremiah, who tonsured and ordained him, he wrote: "I am beginning to be burdened by my academic position to the point of unbearability. I would like to go to church, and sit there". On August 21, 1847, at his request, he was appointed as a member of the Russian Orthodox Ecclesiastical Mission in Jerusalem, headed by Archimandrite Porphyrius (Uspensky). In Jerusalem. Theophan learned iconography and studied Greek, French, Hebrew and Arabic. In Palestine, he became acquainted with the ancient asceticism of the Eastern monasteries and the monuments of ascetic writing of the past centuries. He also engaged in the translation of the works of the holy fathers of the Philokalia. In addition, he became intimately acquainted with the non-Orthodox Christian beliefs. For his works, on May 5, 1851, Theophan was awarded the gold pectoral cross.

In 1853, the Crimean War began; on May 3, 1854, the mission was withdrawn to Russia. The return took place through Western Europe; Theophan visited many cities, churches, museums, libraries, and educational institutions. Notably, Archimandrite Porphyrius and Hieromonk Theophan had an audience with Pope Pius IX.

Upon his return to Russia, he was appointed a teacher of canon law at the Saint Petersburg Theological Academy; on April 14, 1855, he was elevated to the rank of Archimandrite. In September of the same year, he was appointed rector of the Olonets Theological Seminary, which was located in the building of the Petrozavodsk Theological College; Archimandrite Theophan had to organize the construction of his own building for the seminary. At this time he wrote the following: "We don't have a seminary. By right of the strong, we live in a building bought for a school, and it is in an apartment. The seminary bursa is also in the apartment, which is very, very inconvenient". In October 1855, he was appointed a member of the Olonets Ecclesiastical Consistory. At the suggestion of Archbishop Arcadius (Fyodorov), he was appointed censor of the sermons of the Olonets diocese. At the seminary, he organized an anti-schismatic library.

On May 21, 1856, he was appointed rector of the Russian embassy church in Constantinople (Ottoman Empire), as he was well acquainted with the Orthodox East. Theophan was charged with collecting information about the Greco-Bulgarian Schism that was brewing at that time. For his labors, on April 17, 1857, he was awarded the 2nd degree of the Order of St. Anna.

In May 1857, he was appointed rector of the Saint Petersburg Theological Academy. In addition to the rector's office, he was entrusted with overseeing the teaching of the Law of God in secular educational institutions of the St. Petersburg district. He was chairman of the committee at the Academy of Sciences for the publication of works of Byzantine historians; in 1858, he became a chairman of the committee for the translation of Holy Scripture into Russian.

On May 29, 1859, Archimandrite Theophan was elected Bishop of Tambov and Shatsk, and on June 1, in the Trinity Cathedral of the Alexander Nevsky Lavra, he was consecrated bishop. On July 5, he took over the diocese. The Tambov diocese was one of the most extensive and popular; there were 1,172 priests, 681 deacons, several hundred monastics, and many sectarians and Old Believers among the population. Bishop Theophan paid special attention to preaching; he accompanied almost every service with a sermon. Bishop Theophan and the clergy were convinced, as they stated, "that preaching is his first, direct and sacred duty, and at the same time should be an internal need, if only to properly and consciously treat his high ministry". The Tambov male monastery of Our Lady of Kazan at the bishop's house became the center of preaching. In the Tambov Diocesan Gazette, Bishop Theophan published his homiletic treatise "How to compose a sermon", in which he stated the features of the sermon: "the peculiarity of my sermons is that they are not composed […] These are written impromptu."

On July 22, 1863, Bishop Theophan was moved to the ancient Vladimir diocese. At the Diocese of Vladimir, where at the time there were many schismatics and sectarians, Theophan's fame as a preacher strengthened. He authored "Instruction for Preaching the Word of God", published on November 27, 1864 in the Vladimir Diocesan Gazette. In the same year he sent Hieromonk Moses to Moscow to verify old printed books. In Vyazniki county he opened the "Epiphany Orthodox Brotherhood". In 1865, a women's diocesan school was opened under his care. For his archpastoral activity, on April 19, 1864, he was awarded the 1st degree of Order of St. Anna.

== In retirement ==
The petition for his retirement was granted on June 17, 1866, with his appointment as rector in the Vysha Hermitage in the Tambov Governorate. On September 19, at his request, he was dismissed from the management of the monastery. While living in Vysha, he spent his time reading and writing.

He suffered from rheumatism, neuralgia, cardiac arrhythmia and dizziness, as well as progressive cataracts, as a result of which he became blind in his right eye in 1888.

== Death ==
Theophan the Recluse died on January 6, 1894. He was buried in the Kazan church of the Vysha Monastery.

== The Spiritual Life and How to Be Attuned To It ==
The Spiritual Life and How to Be Attuned To It was originally written in response to Theophan's encounter with a young woman. While at a ball, a Moscow woman began having thoughts she believed irrational about the meaning of life and the mortality of humans. After contacting Theophan, the two began corresponding through letters, the lady writing on her spiritual difficulties and Theophan responding with spiritual advice. She later became a nun. The Saint Herman Press, the publisher of the illustrated edition of The Spiritual Life and How to Be Attuned to It, notes that it was of great importance to Theophan that the young woman should "be able to keenly hear the right 'tone' of spiritual life".

== Veneration ==
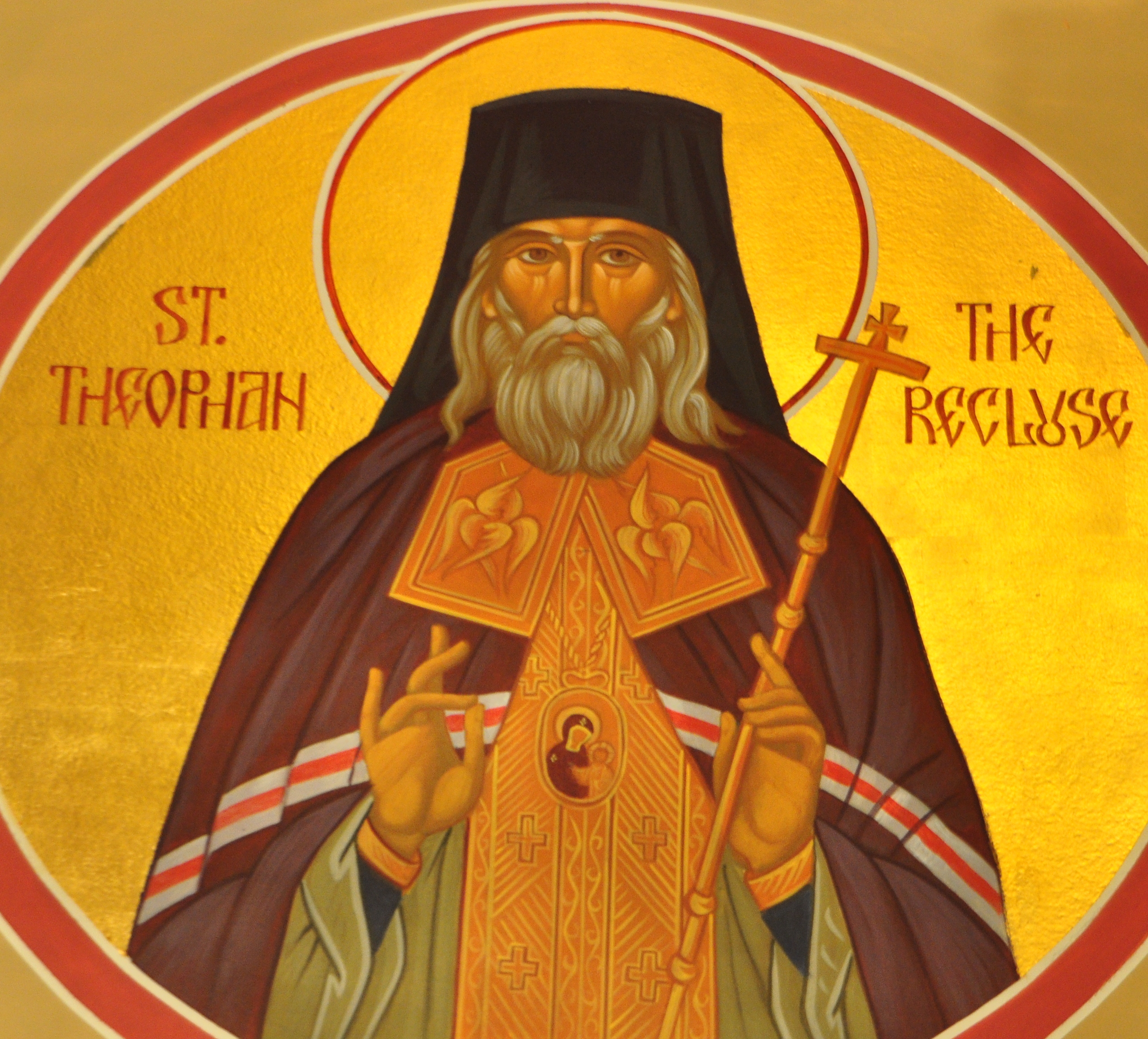
Icon of Theophan

Theophan was canonized by the Local Council of the Russian Orthodox Church of 1988. The act of canonization declared that his "deep theological understanding of the Christian teaching, as well as its performance in practice, and, as a consequence of this, the loftiness and holiness of the life of the sviatitel' allow for his writings to be regarded as a development of the teaching of the Holy Fathers, preserving the same Orthodox purity and Divine enlightenment." His feast day is celebrated January 6 or January 10.

== Quotes ==
- “What you must seek in prayer is to establish in the heart a quiet but warm and constant feeling towards God, not expecting ecstasy or any extraordinary state.”
- “To pray is to descend with the mind into the heart, and there to stand before the face of the Lord, ever-present, all-seeing, within you.”
- "He who believes in God, but does not confess Him as the Father of the Son, does not believe in a god that is the true God, but in some personal invention."
- "Baptism gives us what nothing else on earth can give us: it unites and combines our natural being divine grace... some new element, a supernatural one is added to our composition, and will remain inside us hidden and secretly acting."
- "You ask, will the heterodox be saved... Why do you worry about them? They have a Saviour Who desires the salvation of every human being. He will take care of them. You and I should not be burdened with such a concern. Study yourself and your own sins... I will tell you one thing, however: should you, being Orthodox and possessing the Truth in its fullness, betray Orthodoxy, and enter a different faith, you will lose your soul forever."
- "Where there is no prayer and fasting there are the demons."
- "You must descend from your head into your heart. At present your thoughts of God are in your head.”
- "It is not one's own efforts that lead to the goal, because without grace, efforts produce little. Nor does grace without effort bring what is sought. Grace acts in us and for us in our efforts."

== Books in English translation ==
- Theophan the Recluse (1995). The Spiritual Life and How to Be Attuned To It. St. Herman of Alaska Brotherhood. ISBN 9780938635369.
- Theofan the Recluse. The Path to Salvation: A Manual of Spiritual Transformation. Holy Trinity Orthodox School.
- Turning the Heart to God (Partial translation of The Path to Salvation)
- Theophan the Recluse (1994). Kindling the divine spark : teachings on how to preserve spiritual zeal. St. Xenia Skete Press. ISBN 9780938635444.
- Theophan the Recluse. Four Homilies on Prayer.
- Theophan the Recluse (2014). Psalm 118: A Commentary by Saint Theophan the Recluse. St. John of Kronstadt Press. ISBN 978-1-928920-87-8.
- Theophan the Recluse (1992). Amis, Robin; Williams, Esther (eds.). The Heart of Salvation: The Life and Teachings of Russia's Saint Theophian the Recluse. Praxis Institute. ISBN 978-1872292021.
- Theophan the Recluse (1989). Raising Them Right: A Saint's Advice on Raising Children. Conciliar Press. ISBN 0-9622713-0-6. This book consists of excerpts from his "The Path of Salvation"
- Thoughts for Each Day of the Year according to the Daily Church Readings from the Word of God (St. Herman of Alaska Brotherhood, 2010) ISBN 9781887904223
- Preaching Another Christ: An Orthodox View of Evangelicalism (2024) ISBN 9780977897049
- Now is the Accepted Time: Lenten Sermons of St. Theophan the Recluse (Jordanville: Holy Trinity Publications, 2026) ISBN 9780884655107

== See also ==
- Hermit
- Hesychasm
- Poustinia
- Theophanes the Confessor, a Byzantine saint
