= Nikita =

Nikita may refer to:

- Nikita (given name), people with the given name, including variants
- Nikita, Crimea, a town in Ukraine
- Nikita the Tanner, a character in East Slavic folklore

== Film and television ==
- Little Nikita, a 1988 film
- La Femme Nikita (film), also known as Nikita, a 1990 French-language film starring Anne Parillaud and directed by Luc Besson
  - Point of No Return (film), a 1993 American adaptation of the 1990 film Nikita starring Bridget Fonda and directed by John Badham
  - La Femme Nikita (TV series), a 1997–2001 Canadian television series based on 1990 film by Luc Besson, broadcast as Nikita in Canada, starring Peta Wilson
  - Nikita (TV series), a 2010–2013 American television series on The CW starring Maggie Q

== Music ==
- NikitA, a Ukrainian female band
- "Nikita" (song), by Elton John
