= Sayings of the Desert Fathers =

Stories attributed to early Christian hermits and monks

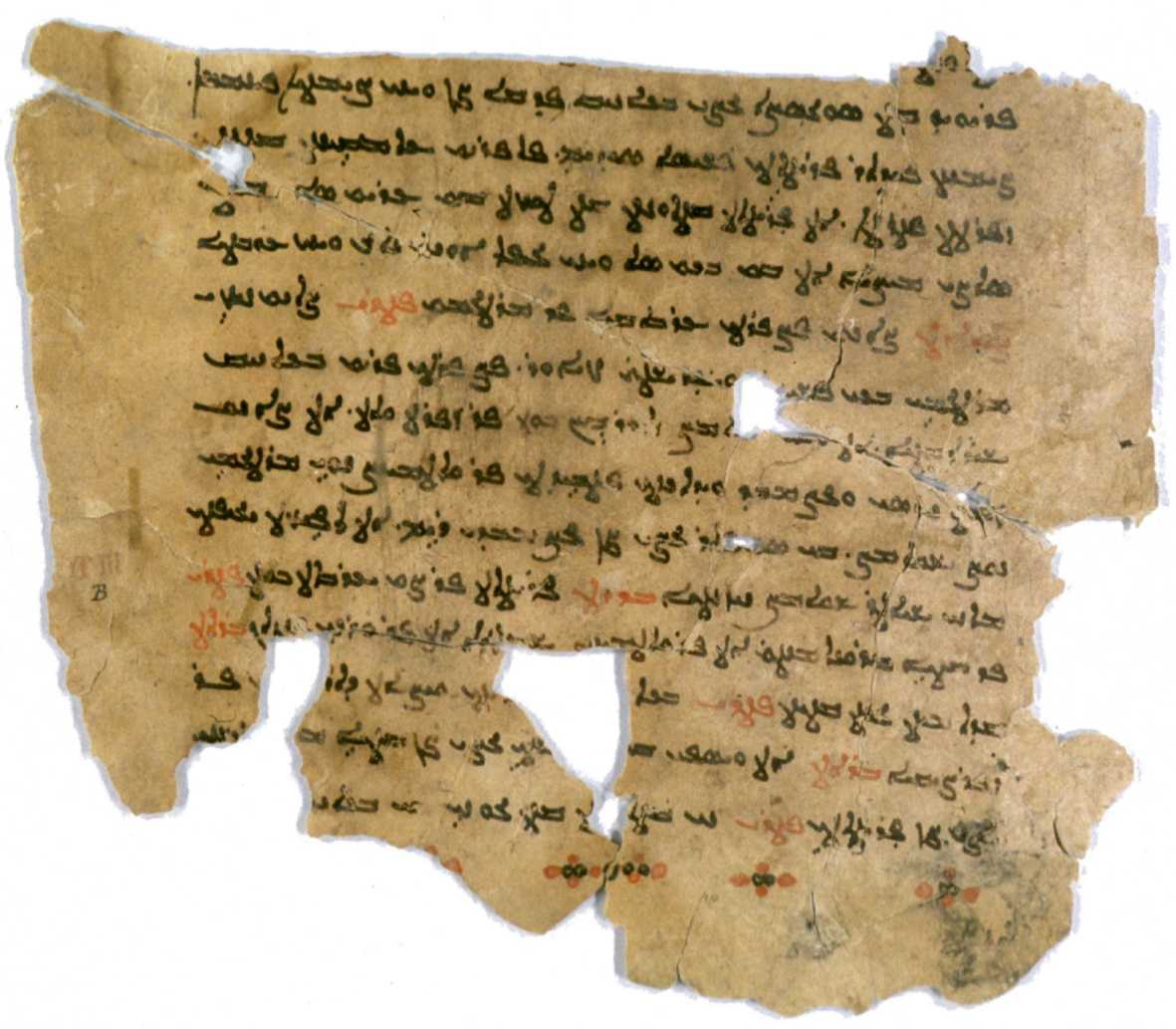
Sogdian Christian copy of the text written in Syriac

The Sayings of the Desert Fathers (Latin: Apophthegmata Patrum Aegyptiorum; Greek: ἀποφθέγματα τῶν πατέρων, romanized: Apophthégmata tōn Patérōn) is the name given to various textual collections consisting of stories and sayings attributed to the Desert Fathers of Egypt from approximately the 5th century AD.

The collections consist of wisdom stories describing the spiritual practices and experiences of early Christian hermits living in the desert of Egypt. They are typically in the form of a conversation between a younger monk and his spiritual father, or as advice given to visitors. Beginning as an oral tradition in the Coptic language, they were only later written down as Greek text. The stories were extremely popular among early Christian monks, and appeared in various forms and collections.

The original sayings were passed down from monk to monk, though in their current version most simply describe the stories in the form of "Abba X said ..." The early Desert Fathers also received many visitors seeking counseling, typically by asking "Give me a word, abba" or "Speak a word, abba, how can I be saved?" Some of the sayings are responses to those seeking guidance.

Many notable Desert Fathers are mentioned in the collections, including Anthony the Great, Abba Arsenius, Abba Poemen, Abba Macarius of Egypt, Abba Pachomius the Great, Abba Amoun the Hermit and Abba Moses the Black. The sayings also include those of three different ammas, most notably Syncletica of Alexandria. Sayings of the Desert Fathers influenced many notable theologians, including Saint Jerome and Saint Augustine.

== History of the text ==
The Desert Fathers of Egypt spoke Coptic, the latest stage of ancient Egyptian. The sayings were originally passed on orally in Coptic, but the original written version was Greek. The earliest written record of the sayings appears to be from the end of the 4th century AD. Two versions from the 5th century, the Collectio Monastica, written in Ethiopic, and the Asceticon of Isaiah of Scetis, written in Greek, show how the oral tradition became the written collections. There are surviving fragments of the Sayings in both the Sahidic and Bohairic dialects of Coptic, but they represent back-translations from Greek. They were collected and published by Marius Chaîne. It is likely that the Sayings were collected in Palestine, a region into which many Egyptian monks emigrated and where parts of the Sayings appear in fundamental texts of the period, such as The Life of Saint Melanie the Younger, Life of Saint Euthymius and the Reflections of Zosimas. Lucien Regnault highlights specifically the role of the monks and writers of the monastery of Seridos, who referenced the Sayings frequently. Dorotheus of Gaza has been also suggested as compiler of at least parts of the Sayings.

The Sayings have been translated in whole or in part several times. Pelagius and John the Deacon made the first translations into Latin. Martin of Braga also translated some of the Sayings into Latin, followed by a more extensive translation by Paschasius of Dumium in approximately 555. That work may contain only one fifth of the original Greek text. In the 17th century, the Dutch Jesuit Heribert Rosweyde compiled and translated all the available sources on the Desert Fathers and published them in Latin as the Vitae patrum.

Two translations in Aramaic were made: the Nestorian monk Ânân Îshô's translation into Classical Syriac from the early 7th century, known as the Paradise of the Fathers; and a Christian Palestinian Aramaic translation known from dispersed fragments for the early transmission (6th to 7th century AD) as well as a fragmentary version for the later period (ca. 10th to 11th century AD), originating from or still housed at the Monastery of Saint Catherine, Mount Sinai There are also Armenian translations of both the Alphabetical and Systematic collections. In the period 867–872, Methodius of Thessaloniki translated the text into Old Church Slavonic, of which the original was lost in the 14th century, but several dozen copies of the Paterik' (Патерікъ) survived. Some of the Sayings are preserved in Arabic and Georgian translations. Through the Asceticon, some of the Sayings made their way into Sogdian.

Helen Waddell translated a selection of elements from the Vitae patrum into English in the early 20th century. The first complete translation of the alphabetical "apophthegmata" into English is that of Benedicta Ward (1975). English translations of the alphabetical, systematic, and anonymous collections were also later published by John Wortley from 2012 to 2014. The most comprehensive critical edition of the alphabetical "apophthegmata" was published by Tim Vivian in two volumes (2021, 2023).

== Examples ==
- One time, the blessed Abba Theophilus the archbishop went to Scetis. But the brothers gathered and said to Abba Pambo: 'Tell the Father one word that he may benefit.' The old man told them: 'If he does not always benefit from our silence, then if we speak he will still not benefit.'
- Abbot Pastor said: 'If a man has done wrong and does not deny it, but says: "I did wrong," do not rebuke him, because you will break the resolution of his soul. And if you tell him: "Do not be sad, brother," but watch it in the future, you stir him up to change his life.'
- A hermit saw someone laughing, and said to him, "We have to render an account of our whole life before heaven and earth, and you can laugh?"
- Abba Longinus said to Abba Acacius: 'A woman knows she has conceived when she no longer loses any blood. So it is with the soul, she knows she has conceived the Holy Spirit when the passions stop coming out of her. But as long as one is held back in the passions, how can one dare to believe one is sinless? Give blood and receive the Spirit.'

== Collections ==
Different Sayings collections include the Alphabetic Sayings, the Systematic Sayings, and the Anonymous Sayings.

=== Anonymous Sayings ===
The sections of the Anonymous Sayings (Wortley 2013) are:

Sayings	English	Greek
1–36	–	–
37–54	Concerning imperial officials	Περὶ τῶν Μαγιστριανῶν
55–131	Concerning the holy habit of monks	Περὶ τοῦ σχήματος τοῦ ἁγίου τῶν μοναχῶν
132	Concerning anchorites	Περὶ ἀναχωρητῶν
133–143	That we should pursue hêsychia and grief for sin	Ὅτι δεῖ τὴν ἡσυχίαν καὶ τὴν κατάνυξιν μεταδιώκειν
144–215	Concerning temperance	Περὶ ἐγκρατείας
216–253	On discretion	Περὶ διακρίσεως
254–255	That one must be on his guard against judging anybody	Ὅτι φυλάττεσθαι χρὴ τὸ μηδένα κρίνει
256–263	That nothing should be done for ostentation and that avarice should be avoided	Περὶ τοῦ μηδὲν εἰς ἐπίδειξιν ποιεῖν, καὶ πλεονεξίαν ἀποστρέφεσθαι
264–280	That one should always be vigilant	Περὶ τοῦ δεῖν πάντοτε νήφειν
281–289	On the necessity of being joyfully compassionate and hospitable	Ὅτι χρὴ ἐλεεῖν καὶ φιλοξενεῖν ἐν ἱλαρότητι
290–297	On obedience	Περὶ ὑπακοῆς
298–334	On humble-mindedness	Περὶ ταπεινοφροσύνης
335–343	Concerning forbearance	Περὶ ἀνεξικακίας
344–358	Concerning charity	Περὶ ἀγάπης
359–453	On those who have the gift of second sight	Περὶ διορατικῶν
454–474	Concerning porneia	Περὶ πορνείας
475–518	On not passing judgement	Περὶ τοῦ μὴ κρίνειν
519–765	Concerning grief for sin [katanyxis, compunctio]	Περὶ κατανύξεως

Wortley's Greek text of the Anonymous Sayings is based on the following manuscripts.

- MS Paris Coislin 126, (10th-11th centuries), contains 676 sayings
- MS Sinai St. Catherine 448 (1004 AD), contains 765 sayings
- MS Vatic. Graec. 1599 (10th century), contains 765 sayings

=== Alphabetical Sayings ===
The Alphabetical Sayings (Ward 1984) list the sayings of 131 Desert Fathers and Desert Mothers. Although some of the Desert Fathers quoted in the collection are well known, other names are obscure and difficult to identify.

- Anthony the Great
- Arsenius
- Agathon
- Ammonas
- Achilles
- Ammoes
- Amoun of Nitria
- Anoub
- Abraham of Scetes
- Ares
- Alonius
- Apphy
- Apollo the Shepherd
- Andrew
- Aio
- Ammonathas
- Basil the Great
- Bessarion of Egypt
- Benjamin
- Biare (or Biares)
- Gregory the Theologian
- Gelasius of Nilopolis
- Gerontius of Petra
- Daniel
- Dioscorus
- Doulas
- Epiphanius of Salamis, Bishop of Cyprus
- Ephrem the Syrian
- Eucharistus the Secular
- Eulogius the Priest
- Euprepius of Egypt
- Helladius
- Evagrius Ponticus
- Eudaemon
- Zeno of Gaza
- Zachariah the Recluse
- Isaiah of Gaza
- Elias the Hermit
- Heraclides
- Theodore of Pherme
- Theodore of Enaton
- Theodore of Scetis
- Theodore of Eleutheropolis
- Theonas
- Theophilus the Archbishop
- Theodora of Alexandria
- John the Dwarf
- John the Cenobite
- Isidore the Priest
- Isidore of Pelusium
- Isaac of the Cells
- Joseph of Panephysis
- James
- Hierax
- John the Eunuch
- John of the Cells
- John of the Thebaid
- John the Persian
- John the Theban
- John, disciple of Abba Paul
- Isaac the Theban
- Joseph of Thebes
- Hilarion
- Ischyrion
- Cassian
- Cronius of Nitria
- Carion the Egyptian
- Copres
- Cyrus
- Lucius
- Lot
- Longinus
- Macarius the Great
- Moses the Black
- Matoes
- Mark, disciple of Abba Silvanus
- Milesius (or Miles)
- Motius
- Megethius
- Mius of Belos
- Mark the Egyptian
- Macarius of Alexandria
- Nilus
- Nisterus
- Nisterus the Cenobite
- Nicon
- Netras
- Nicetas
- Xoius
- Xanthias
- Olympius
- Orsisius
- Poemen (called the Shepherd)
- Pambo
- Pistus
- Pior
- Pityrion
- Pistamon
- Peter the Pionite
- Paphnutius the Ascetic
- Paul
- Paul the Barber
- Paul the Great
- Paul the Simple
- Peter of Dios
- an Abba of Rome (most likely Arsenius)
- Rufus
- Romanus
- Sisoes the Great
- Silvanus
- Simon
- Sopatrus
- Sarmatas
- Serapion of Nitria
- Serinus
- Spyridon
- Saius
- Sarah of the Desert
- Syncletica
- Tithoes
- Timothy
- Hyperechios
- Phocas
- Felix
- Philagrius
- Phortas
- Chomas
- Chaeremon
- Psenthaisius
- Or

=== Systematic Sayings ===
The 20 chapters of the Systematic Sayings (Wortley 2012) are:

Chapter	Title
Prologue	Prologue to The Book of the Elders Called Paradise
1	An Exhortation of Holy Fathers on Advancing toward Perfection
2	Every Effort Should Be Made to Pursue Hesychia
3	Sorrow for Sin [Katanyxis, "Compunction"]
4	Self-Control [Egkrateia] Should Be Achieved Not Only in the Case of Food but Also in Other Movements of the Soul
5	Various Narratives for Security in the Wars Arising against Us from Porneia
6	Poverty [Aktemosyne] and That It Is Necessary to Guard against Covetousness
7	Various Narratives Preparing Us for Patience and Courage
8	One Should Do Nothing for Show
9	One Should Guard against Judging Anybody
10	Discretion [Diakrisis]
11	One Should Ever Be on Watch
12	One Should Pray without Ceasing
13	One Must Joyfully Practice Hospitality and Show Compassion
14	Obedience
15	Humility
16	Forbearance [Anexikakia]
17	Love [Agape]
18	Those Who Have Second Sight [Dioratikoi]
19	Wonder-Working Elders
20	Virtuous Living

==== Versions ====
There are four major versions of the Systematic Collection, in Greek, Latin, Syriac, and Armenian. The earliest Greek manuscript of the Systematic Sayings is MS Athos Lavra B 37 (copied in 970 AD). The contents of each are:

The Greek Systematic Collection
Book	Chapter Titles	No. of Sayings
Book I	Exhortation of the holy fathers concerning progress toward perfection	37
Book II	Concerning peace (hesychia) to be pursued with all eagerness	35
Book III	Concerning compunction	56
Book IV	Concerning temperance in food and concerning the mastery of all	104
Book V	Various stories to keep on guard against assaults of luxury	54
Book VI	Concerning poverty and the necessity of keeping oneself from avarice	28
Book VII	Various stories training us to patience and courage	62
Book VIII	That nothing be done for show	32
Book IX	To be on watch to not judge anyone	26
Book X	Concerning discernment	194
Book XI	Concerning the necessity of constant vigilance	127
Book XII	Concerning unceasing prayer	28
Book XIII	Concerning hospitality and almsgiving done with joy	19
Book XIV	Concerning obedience	32
Book XV	Concerning humility	136
Book XVI	Concerning long-suffering	30
Book XVII	Concerning charity	35
Book XVIII	Concerning great visionaries	53
Book XIX	Concerning those who work miracles	21
Book XX	Concerning virtuous behavior	24
Book XXI	Sayings of those who endure in asceticism, showing their eminent virtue	66
Total		1199

Verba Seniorum of Pelagius and John (Latin)
Book	Chapter Titles	No. of Sayings
Book I	Concerning the perfecting of the fathers	23
Book II	Concerning quiet	16
Book III	Concerning compunction	27
Book IV	Concerning continence	70
Book V	Concerning fornication	41
Book VI	Concerning [the idea] that a monk should possess nothing	22
Book VII	Concerning patience, or fortitude	47
Book VIII	Concerning [the idea] that nothing should be done for show	24
Book IX	Concerning that we should judge no man	12
Book X	Concerning discernment	113
Book XI	Concerning [the idea] that it is right to live soberly	54
Book XII	Concerning [the idea] that we ought to pray unceasingly and soberly	15
Book XIII	Concerning [the idea] that it is best to be hospitable and show mercy with cheerfulness	14
Book XIV	Concerning obedience	19
Book XV	Concerning humility	89
Book XVI	Concerning patience	19
Book XVII	Concerning charity	25
Book XVIII	Concerning foresight or contemplation	36
Book XIX	Concerning the holy old men who used to work signs	17
Book XX	Concerning the best sayings of various saints	18
Book XXI	The 7 chapters that Abba Moses sent to Abba Poemen [and other miscellaneous sayings]	24
Total		725

The Syriac Paradise of the Fathers by Ânân Îshô
Book	Chapter Titles	No. of Sayings
Book I, Chapter 1	Palladius on flight from men and silent contemplation	Sayings 1–62
Book I, Chapter 2	Concerning fasting and abstinence	Sayings 63–104
Book I, Chapter 3	Concerning the reading of the scriptures, night vigils, the service of the Psalms, and constant prayer	Sayings 105–135
Book I, Chapter 4	Concerning the weeping and mourning for sins	Sayings 136–157
Book I, Chapter 5	Concerning voluntary poverty	Sayings 158–182
Book I, Chapter 6	Concerning patient endurance	Sayings 183–237
Book I, Chapter 7	Concerning obedience to God and man	Sayings 238–247
Book I, Chapter 8	Concerning watchfulness in thought, word, and deed	Sayings 248–392
Book I, Chapter 9	Concerning love, charity, and hospitality	Sayings 393–443
Book I, Chapter 10	Concerning humility	Sayings 444–558
Book I, Chapter 11	Concerning fornication	Sayings 559–597
Book I, Chapter 12	Concerning the acceptance of repentance	Sayings 598–613
Book I, Chapter 13	Concerning the fathers who wrought wonderful works	Sayings 614–630
Book I, Chapter 14	Concerning the greatness of the solitary life	Sayings 631–635
Book II, Chapters 1–15	Questions and answers on the ascetic rule	Sayings 1–539
Book II, Chapters 16–17	Questions and answers by the fathers and monks	Sayings 540–576
Book II, Chapter 18	Questions and answers on the vision of the mind	Sayings 577–602
Appendix		Sayings 603–705

The Armenian Paterica
Book	Chapter Titles	No. of Sayings
Book I	Concerning perfect virtue	46 + 116R
Book II	Concerning quiet	28 + 37R
Book III	Concerning compunction and tears	50 + 36R
Book IV	Concerning abstinence	58 + 63R
Book V	Concerning fornication	81 + 47R
Book VI	Concerning destitution	20 + 23R
Book VII	Concerning strength and forbearance	45 + 49R
Book VIII	Concerning doing nothing for show	18 + 15R
Book IX	Concerning discernment	27 + 19R
Book X	Concerning divine and right judgment	79 + 114R
Book XI	Concerning vigilance and sobriety	34 + 51R
Book XII	Concerning prayer	11 + 14R
Book XIII	Concerning being hospitable and merciful	17 + 19R
Book XIV	Concerning obedience	17 + 19R
Book XV	Concerning humility	71 + 100R
Book XVI	Concerning forgetfulness of injuries	9 + 18R
Book XVII	Concerning loving God and neighbor	26 + 35R
Book XVIII	Concerning spirit-seeing and wonder-working of the fathers	93 + 39R
Book XIX	Concerning the conversation of the fathers	28 + 26R
Total		1598

== See also ==
- Asceticon
- Ethiopic Collectio Monastica
- Ethics of the Fathers
- Gospel of Thomas
- Kōan
- Lausiac History
- Patericon
- Vitae Patrum
- Wisdom literature

== Bibliography ==
=== Translations ===
- Williams, Rowan (2004-11-19). Silence and Honey Cakes: The Wisdom of the Desert. Lion Publishing plc. ISBN 0-7459-5170-8.
- Ward, Benedicta (2003-07-29). The Desert Fathers: Sayings of the Early Christian Monks (Revised ed.). Penguin Classics. ISBN 0-14-044731-8. (Systematic collection)
- Sourozh, Metropolitan Anthony of; Benedicta Ward (June 1987). The Sayings of the Desert Fathers (Revised ed.). Cistercian Publications. ISBN 0-87907-959-2.
- Merton, Thomas (2004-11-16). The Wisdom of the Desert: Sayings from the Desert Fathers of the Fourth Century (Gift ed.). Shambhala. ISBN 1-59030-039-4.
- Wortley, John, ed. (2013). The Anonymous Sayings of the Desert Fathers: A Select Edition and Complete English Translation (in Greek and English). Cambridge University Press. ISBN 978-0-521-50988-6.
- Wortley, John (2014). Give Me a Word: The Alphabetical Sayings of the Desert Fathers. Popular Patristics Series. Vol. 52. Yonkers, New York: Saint Vladimir's Seminary Press. ISBN 978-0-88141-497-4.
- Wortley, John, ed. (2019). More sayings of the Desert Fathers: an English translation and notes. Cambridge: Cambridge University Press. ISBN 978-1-108-47108-4.
- The Teachings of the Desert Fathers. Translated by Richard Goodrich. New York / Mahwan: The Newman Press. 2020. ISBN 978-0809106455.
- Vivian, Tim, ed. (2021). The sayings and stories of the Desert Fathers and Mothers: A–H (Ȇta). Vol. 1. Collegeville, Minnesota: Cistercian Publications. ISBN 978-0-87907-109-7.
- Vivian, Tim, ed. (2023). The sayings and stories of the Desert Fathers and Mothers: Th–Ō (Thêta–Ōméga). Vol. 2. Collegeville, Minnesota: Cistercian Publications. ISBN 978-0-87907-292-6.
- Nomura, Yushi. Desert Wisdom: Sayings from the Desert Fathers. Maryknoll, N.Y.: Orbis Books, 2001.
- Regnault, Lucien. Les chemins de Dieu au désert: collection systematique des Apophtegmes des Pères. Solesmes: Éditions de Solesmes, 1992. (complete French translation of the Greek Systematic Collection)
- Dion, J. and G. Oury. Les Sentences des Pères du Désert: recueil de Pélage et Jean. Solesmes: Abbaye Saint-Pierre, 1966. (complete French translation of the Latin Systematic Collection (Verba Seniorum of Pelagius and John))
- Chaîne M. (ed). Le manuscrit de la version copte en dialect sahidique des "Apophthegmata Patrum". Bibliothèque d'études coptes 6. Cairo: Institut Français d'Archéologie Orientale, 1960. (Sahidic Coptic text)
- Regnault, Lucien. Les Sentences des Pères du Désert: troisième recueil et tables. Sablé-sur-Sarthe: Solesmes, 1976. (French translation of the Bohairic Coptic version in pp. 139–194, and of the Armenian version in pp. 253–275)
- Budge, E. A. Wallis. The Sayings and Stories of the Christian Fathers of Egypt: The Syrian Version of the "Apophthegmata Patrum" (2 vol.). Reprint of 1934 ed. London: Kegan Paul Limited, 2002. (English translation of the Syriac Collection)
- Palladius of Galatia (1907). The Paradise or Garden of the Holy Fathers, Volume 2: Sayings of the Desert Fathers . Translated by Ernest Alfred Wallis Budge. Chatto & Windus.
- Leloir, Louis (ed). Paterica armeniaca a P. P. Mechitaristis edita (1855) nunc latine reddita. CSCO 353, 361, 371, 379. Louvain: Secrétariat du Corpus SCO, 1974–1976. (Armenian text)

=== Further reading ===
- Chryssavgis, John (2019-01-04). "The Desert Fathers and Mothers". In Parry, Ken (ed.). The Wiley Blackwell Companion to Patristics. John Wiley & Sons. pp. 326–337. ISBN 978-1-119-51773-3.
