= Desert Fathers =

3rd-century Christian hermits, ascetics, and monks

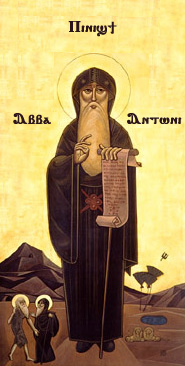
Coptic icon of Anthony the Great

The Desert Fathers were early Christian hermits and ascetics, who lived primarily in the Wadi El Natrun, then known as Skete, in Roman Egypt, beginning around the third century. The Sayings of the Desert Fathers is a collection of sayings and other texts attributed to desert monks and nuns from this era.

The first Desert Father was Paul of Thebes. The most well-known was Anthony the Great, who moved to the desert in 270–271 and became known as both the father and founder of desert monasticism. By the time Anthony had died in 356, thousands of monks and nuns had been drawn to live in the desert following Anthony's example, leading his biographer, Athanasius of Alexandria, to write that "the desert had become a city." The Desert Fathers significantly influenced the development of Christianity.

The desert monastic communities that grew out of the informal gathering of hermit monks became the model for Christian monasticism, first influencing the Coptic communities these monks were a part of and preached to. Some were monophysites or believed in a similar idea.

The eastern monastic tradition at Mount Athos and the western Rule of Saint Benedict were both strongly influenced by the traditions that began in the desert. All of the monastic revivals of the Middle Ages looked to the desert for inspiration and guidance. Much of Eastern Christian spirituality, including the Hesychast movement, has its roots in the practices of the Desert Fathers. Even religious renewals such as the German evangelicals and Pietists in Pennsylvania, the Devotio Moderna movement, and the Methodist Revival in England are seen by modern scholars as being influenced by the Desert Fathers.

== Early history ==
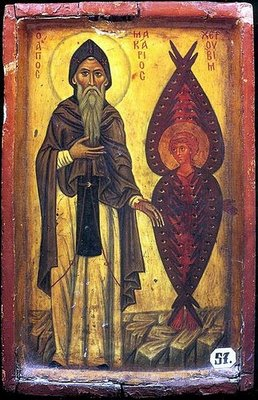
"Saint Macarius and a Cherub" from Saint Catherine's Monastery, Sinai, Egypt

Paul of Thebes is often credited with being the first hermit monk to go to the desert, but it was Anthony the Great who launched the movement that became the Desert Fathers. Sometime around 270, Anthony heard a Sunday sermon stating that perfection could be achieved by selling all of one's possessions, giving the proceeds to the poor, and following Jesus. He followed the advice and made the further step of moving deep into the desert to seek complete solitude.

Anthony lived in a time of transition for Christianity: the Diocletianic Persecution in 303 was the last great formal persecution of Christians in the Roman Empire. Only ten years later, Christianity was made legal in Egypt by Diocletian's successor, Constantine the Great. Those who left for the desert formed an alternate Christian society when becoming a Christian was no longer risky. Anthony saw the desert's solitude, austerity, and sacrifice as an alternative to martyrdom, which many Christians formerly saw as the highest form of sacrifice. Anthony quickly gained followers eager to live their lives with solidarity and separation from material goods. From these prohibitions, Athanasius recorded that Anthony received special privileges from God, such as the ability to heal the sick, inspire others to have faith in healing through God, and even occasionally converse with God.

Around this time, desert monasticism appeared nearly simultaneously in several areas, including Egypt and Roman Syria, and some of the Desert Fathers's Coptic traditions also spread to Nubia.

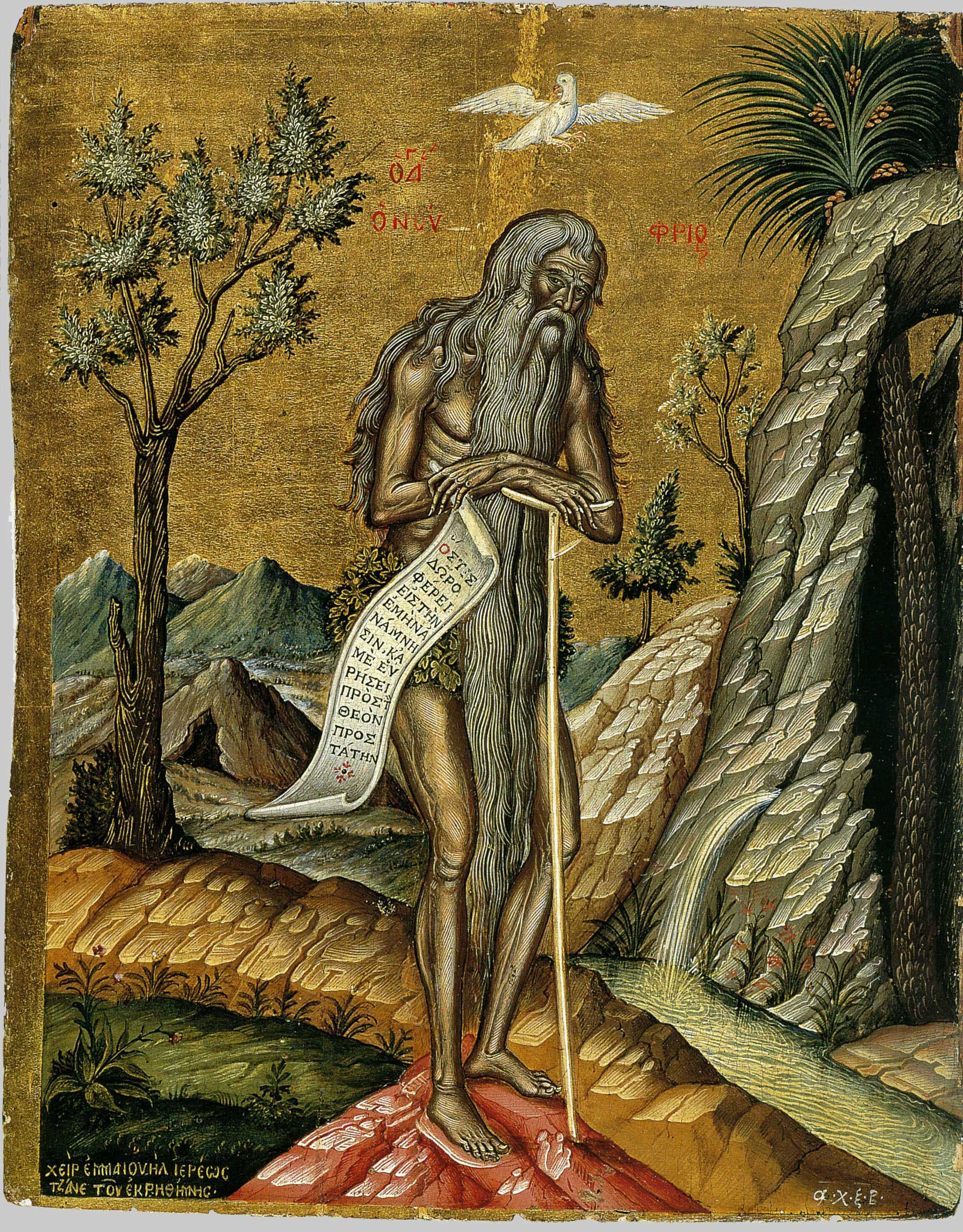
Fourth-century Desert Father from Ethiopia, Saint Onuphrius, lived in seclusion in the desert of Upper Egypt

Over time, the model of Anthony and other hermits attracted many followers, who lived alone in the desert or small groups. They chose a life of extreme asceticism, renouncing all the pleasures of the senses, rich food, baths, rest, and anything that made them comfortable. They instead focused on praying, singing psalms, fasting, giving alms to the needy, and preserving love and harmony with one another while keeping their thoughts and desires for God alone. Thousands joined them in the desert, mostly men but also a handful of women. Religious seekers also began going to the desert seeking advice and counsel from the early Desert Fathers. By the time of Anthony's death, there were so many men and women living in the desert that it was described as "a city" by Anthony's biographer.

The Desert Fathers advocated three main approaches to monasticism. One was the austere life of the hermit, as practiced by Anthony and his followers in lower Egypt. Another was the cenobitic life, communities of monks and nuns in Upper Egypt formed by Pachomius the Great. The third was begun by Saint Amun as a semi-hermitic lifestyle seen primarily in Nitria, Kellia, and Scetis west of the Nile. The latter were small groups (two to six) of monks and nuns with a common spiritual elder—these separate groups would join in larger gatherings to worship on Saturdays and Sundays. This third form of monasticism was responsible for most of the sayings that were compiled as the Sayings of the Desert Fathers.

== Development of monastic communities ==
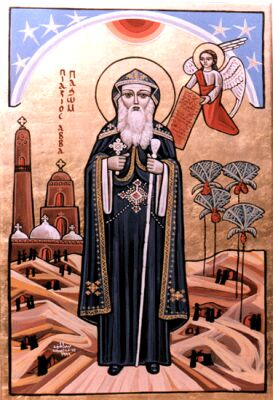
Icon of Pachomius

The small communities founded by the Desert Fathers were the beginning of Christian monasticism. Initially Anthony and others lived as hermits, sometimes forming groups of two or three. Small informal communities began developing, until the monk Pachomius, seeing the need for a more formal structure, established a monastery with rules and organization. His regulations included discipline, obedience, manual labour, silence, fasting, and long periods of prayer—some historians view the rules as being inspired by Pachomius' experiences as a Roman soldier.

The first fully organized monastery with Pachomius included men and women living in separate quarters, up to three in a room. They supported themselves by weaving cloth and baskets, along with other tasks. Each new monk or nun had a three-year probationary period, concluding with admittance in full standing to the monastery. All property was held communally, meals were eaten together and in silence, twice a week they fasted, and they wore simple peasant clothing with a hood. Several times a day they came together for prayer and readings, and each person was expected to spend time alone meditating on the scriptures. Programs were created for educating those who came to the monastery unable to read.

Pachomius also formalized the establishment of an abba (father) or amma (mother) in charge of the spiritual welfare of their monks and nuns, with the implication that those joining the monastery were also joining a new family. Members also formed smaller groups, with different tasks in the community and the responsibility of looking after each other's welfare. The new approach grew to the point that there were tens of thousands of monks and nuns in these organized communities within decades of Pachomius' death. One of the early pilgrims to the desert was Basil of Caesarea, who took the Rule of Pachomius into the Eastern Church. Basil expanded the idea of community by integrating the monks and nuns into the wider public community, with the monks and nuns under the authority of a bishop and serving the poor and needy.

As more pilgrims began visiting the monks in the desert, influence from the monastic communities began spreading. Latin versions of the original Greek stories and sayings of the Desert Fathers, along with the earliest monastic rules coming out of the desert, guided the early monastic development in the Byzantine world and eventually in the Western Christian world and beyond its existing boundaries. John Cassian played an important role in mediating the influence of the Desert Fathers to the West. This can be seen, for example, in the Rule of Saint Benedict, in which Benedict of Nursia urged his monks to read the writings of John Cassian on the Desert Fathers. The Sayings of the Desert Fathers was also widely read in the early Benedictine monasteries.

== Notable Desert Fathers and Mothers ==
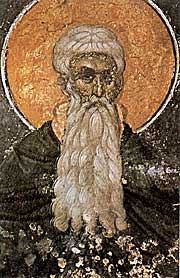
Icon of Arsenius the Great, notable Desert Father

Many of the monks and nuns developed a reputation for holiness and wisdom, with the small communities following a particularly holy or wise elder, who was their spiritual father (abba) or mother (amma). The individual Desert Fathers and Desert Mothers are mostly known through The Sayings of the Desert Fathers, which included 1,202 sayings attributed to twenty-seven abbas and three ammas. The largest number of sayings are attributed to Abba Poemen, Greek for "shepherd". Because of the wide disparity of dates for the sayings attributed to Abba Poemen, some scholars believe that "Poemen" was a generic name for a combination of different unnamed abbas. Others conclude that the sayings attributed to Abba Poemen are accurate, based on a notable and historical Abba Poemen. Among the notable Desert Fathers and Mothers with sayings in the book, in addition to Anthony the Great, were Arsenius the Great, Poemen, Macarius of Egypt, Moses the Black, and Syncletica of Alexandria.

Other notable Desert Fathers include Pachomius, Or of Nitria, and Shenoute. Many individuals spent part of their lives in the Egyptian desert, including Athanasius of Alexandria, Evagrius Ponticus, and Hilarion (later lived as a hermit in the area of Gaza). John Cassian's works brought the wisdom of the Desert Fathers into a wider arena.

== Practices ==
=== Withdrawal from society ===
The legalization of Christianity by the Roman Empire in 313 gave Anthony a greater resolve to go out into the desert. Nostalgic for the tradition of martyrdom, he saw withdrawal and asceticism as an alternative. He insisted on selling all his material possessions—he left his younger sister a small amount of money to live her life in a convent, and donated the rest to the poor. When members of the church began finding ways to work with the Roman state, the Desert Fathers saw that as a compromise between "the things of God and the things of Caesar." The monastic communities were essentially an alternate Christian society. The hermits doubted that religion and politics could ever produce a truly Christian society. For them, the only Christian society was spiritual and not mundane.

=== Hesychasm ===
Hesychasm (from the Greek for "stillness, rest, quiet, silence") is a mystical tradition and movement that originated with the Desert Fathers and was central to their practice of prayer. Hesychasm for the Desert Fathers was primarily the practice of "interior silence and continual prayer." It did not become a formal movement of specific practices until the fourteenth century Byzantine meditative prayer techniques, when it was more closely identified with the Prayer of the Heart, or "Jesus Prayer". The prayer's origin is also traced back to the Desert Fathers—the Prayer of the Heart was found inscribed in the ruins of a cell from that period in the Egyptian desert. The earliest written reference to the practice of the Prayer of the Heart may be in a discourse collected in the Philokalia on Abba Philimon, a Desert Father. Hesychast prayer was a meditative practice that was traditionally done in silence and with eyes closed—"empty of mental pictures" and visual concepts, but with the intense consciousness of God's presence.

The words hesychast and hesychia were frequently used in 4th and 5th century writings of Desert Fathers such as Macarius of Egypt, Evagrius Ponticus, and Gregory of Nyssa. The title hesychast was used in early times synonymously with hermit, as compared to a cenobite who lived in community. Hesychasm can refer to inner or outer stillness, though in The Sayings of the Desert Fathers it referred to inner tranquility.

=== Charity and forgiveness ===
The Desert Fathers gave a great deal of emphasis to living and practicing the teachings of Jesus, much more than theoretical knowledge. Their efforts to live the commandments were not seen as being easy—many of the stories from that time recount the struggle to overcome negative emotions such as anger and judgment of others. Helping a brother monk who was ill or struggling was seen as taking priority over any other consideration. Hermits were frequently seen to break a long fast when hosting visitors, as hospitality and kindness were more important than keeping the ascetic practices that were so dominant in the Desert Fathers' lives.

=== Recitation of scripture ===
The lives of the Desert Fathers that were organized into communities included frequent recitation of the scriptures—during the week they chanted psalms while performing manual labour and during the weekends they held liturgies and group services. The monk's experience in the cell occurred in a variety of ways, including meditation on scripture. Group practices were more prominent in the organized communities formed by Pachomius. The purpose of these practices were explained by John Cassian, a Desert Father, who described the goal of psalmody (the outward recitation of scripture) and asceticism as the ascent to deep mystical prayer and mystical contemplation.

== Selected excerpts from The Sayings of the Desert Fathers ==
- "A hermit said, 'Take care to be silent. Empty your mind. Attend to your meditation in the fear of God, whether you are resting or at work. If you do this, you will not fear the attacks of the demons.'"
- Abba Moses, "Sit in thy cell and thy cell will teach thee all."
- "Somebody asked Anthony, 'What shall I do in order to please God?' He replied, 'Do what I tell you, which is this: wherever you go, keep God in mind; whatever you do, follow the example of Holy Scripture; wherever you are, stay there and do not move away in a hurry. If you keep to these guide-lines, you will be saved.'"
- "He (Evagrius) also said, 'A monk was told that his father had died. He said to the messenger, 'Do not blaspheme. My Father cannot die.'"
- Abbot Pastor, "If someone does evil to you, you should do good to him, so that by your good work you may drive out his malice."
- An Elder, "A man who keeps death before his eyes will at all times overcome his cowardliness."
- Blessed Macarius said, "This is the truth, if a monk regards contempt as praise, poverty as riches, and hunger as a feast, he will never die."
- "It happened that as Abba Arsenius was sitting in his cell that he was harassed by demons. His servants, on their return, stood outside his cell and heard him praying to God in these words, 'O God, do not leave me. I have done nothing good in your sight, but according to your goodness, let me now make a beginning of good.'"
- When one desert father told another of his plans to "shut himself into his cell and refuse the face of men, that he might perfect himself," the second monk replied, "Unless thou first amend thy life going to and fro amongst men, thou shall not avail to amend it dwelling alone."
- "Abba Anthony said, 'Whoever hammers a lump of iron, first decides what he is going to make of it, a scythe, a sword, or an axe. Even so we ought to make up our minds what kind of virtue we want to forge or we labour in vain.'"
- He also said, "Obedience with abstinence gives men power over wild beasts."
- "It was said of Abba John the Dwarf, that one day he said to his elder brother, 'I should like to be free of all care, like the angels, who do not work, but ceaselessly offer worship to God.' So he took off his cloak and went away into the desert. After a week he came back to his brother. When he knocked on the door, he heard his brother say, before he opened it 'Who are you?' He said, 'I am John, your brother.' But he replied, 'John has become an angel, and henceforth he is no longer among men.' Then the other begged him saying, 'It is I.' However, his brother did not let him in, but left him there in distress until morning. Then, opening the door, he said to him, 'You are a man and you must once again work in order to eat.' Then John made a prostration before him, saying, 'Forgive me.'"

== Essential texts ==
There are many different collections of sayings of the Desert Fathers. The earliest writings were simply ordered by the initial letter of the Abba's name in the order of the Greek alphabet, resulting in the editors starting with Anthony the Great, Arsenius and Agathon, and concluding with Cheremon, Psenthaisius and Or. These editors were the first to use the word apophthegms (meaning: saying, maxim or aphorism), resulting in this collection being known as Apophthegmata Patrum Alphabetica (The Sayings of the Desert Fathers: The Alphabetical Collection). This collection contains about a thousand items.

The same editors also recognised a number of anonymous sayings and tales of the Desert Fathers and Mothers that were popularly circulated. This material was gathered into a collection now known as the Anonymous Patrum Apophthegmata (Anonymous Sayings of the Desert Fathers). These sayings were loosely ordered by subject (for instance: humility, charity etc.).

The collection now known as the Systematic Collection began to emerge a century later (c. 500 AD) and features sayings from the Alphabetic Collection and the Anonymous Sayings, combined and systematically ordered under twenty-one chapters. This collection contains about 1200 items and therefore does not completely combine the two older collections.

The various collections of sayings often overlap.

=== Partial list of traditional texts ===
- Sayings of the Desert Fathers (Apophthegmata Patrum)
  - The Anonymous Sayings of the Desert Fathers (Anonymous Apophthegmata)
  - The Alphabetical Sayings of the Desert Fathers
  - The Systematic Sayings of the Desert Fathers (also known as the Systematic Collection, The Book of the Elders or the Gerontikon)
- Ethiopic Collectio Monastica, which includes many sayings of the Desert Fathers not included in the Apophthegmata Patrum
- The Lives of the Desert Fathers (Historia Monachorum in Aegypto)
- The Paradise of the Desert Fathers (also known as Bustan al-Rohbaan or Garden of the Monks)
- The Lausiac History by Palladius of Galatia
- The Vitae Patrum by Jerome
- The Evergetinos by Nicodemus the Hagiorite and Macarius of Corinth
- The Philokalia by Nicodemus the Hagiorite and Macarius of Corinth
- The Conferences and The Institutes by John Cassian
- The Life of Anthony by Serapion of Nitria
- Life of Antony by Athanasius of Alexandria
- The Matericon, collection of sayings of the Desert Mothers
- The Asceticon by Isaiah of Scetis
- A History of the Monks of Syria by Theodoret of Cyrrhus
- The Life of Anthony by Serapion of Thmuis (not to be confused with the Life of Anthony by Athanasius).

== Partial list of modern published texts ==
- Agailby, Elizabeth. The Arabic Life of Antony Attributed to Serapion of Thmuis: Cultural Memory Reinterpreted. ISBN 978-90-04-38327-2.
- Archbishop Chrysostomos of Etna. The Ancient Fathers of the desert: Translated narratives from the Evergetinos on passions and perfection in Christ. ISBN 0-916586-78-2
- Archbishop Chrysostomos of Etna. The Evergetinos: A Complete Text. ISBN 9780911165777.
- Arras, Victor (translator). Collectio monastica. ISBN 9042902787.
- Beasley-Topliffe, Keith, ed. Seeking a Purer Christian Life: Sayings and Stories of the Desert Fathers and Mothers. ISBN 0-8358-0902-1.
- Budge, Sir E. A. Wallis. Paradise of the Desert Fathers: Volumes 1 & 2. ISBN 9780980517149, 9780980517125.
- Cain, Andrew. The Greek Historia Monachorum in Aegypto: Monastic Hagiography in the Late Fourth Century. ISBN 0198758251
- Carrigan, Henry L. Eternal Wisdom from the Desert: Writings from the Desert Fathers. ISBN 1-55725-283-1.
- Chryssavgis, John; Ward, Benedicta. In the Heart of the Desert: The Spirituality of the Desert Fathers and Mothers. ISBN 0-941532-51-8.
- Chryssavgis, John; Penkett, Robert (translators). Abba Isaiah of Scetis: Ascetic Discourses. ISBN 0879077506.
- Cowan, James. Desert Father: In the Desert with Saint Anthony. ISBN 1-59030-145-5.
- Gregg, Robert C. Athanasius: The Life of Antony and the Letter to Marcellinus. ISBN 0809103095.
- Gruen, Anselm. Heaven Begins Within You: Wisdom from the Desert Fathers. ISBN 0-8245-1818-7.
- Keller, David G. R. Oasis Of Wisdom: The Worlds of the Desert Fathers and Mothers.
- Luibheid, Colm (translator). John Cassian: Conferences. ISBN 080912694X.
- Matarazzo, Jon. Vitae Patrum: The Life Of Abba Antony from the Book of the Vitae Patrum. ISBN 0595290191.
- Mayers, Gregory. Listen to the Desert: Secrets of Spiritual Maturity from the Desert Fathers and Mothers. ISBN 0-89243-930-0.
- McGuckin, John Anthony. The Book of Mystical Chapters: Meditations on the Soul's Ascent, from the Desert Fathers and Other Early Christian Contemplatives. ISBN 1-59030-007-6.
- Merton, Thomas. The Wisdom of the Desert: Sayings from the Desert Fathers of the Fourth Century. ISBN 1-59030-039-4, 0-85969-003-2.
- Merton, Thomas. Wisdom of the Desert. ISBN 0-8112-0102-3.
- Merton, Thomas. The Wisdom of the Desert. ISBN 0-87773-976-5, 0-86012-276-X, 0-8112-0313-1.
- Nomura, Yushi (translation and art); Nouwen, Henri J. M. (introduction). Desert Wisdom: Sayings from the Desert Fathers. ISBN 1-57075-371-7.
- Nomura, Yushi. Desert Wisdom: Sayings from the Desert Fathers. ISBN 0-385-18079-9, 0-385-18078-0.
- Palmer, G. E. H; Sherrard, Phillip; Ware, Kallistos (translators). The Philokalia: The Complete Text Compiled by St. Nikodimos of the Holy Mountain & St. Markarios of Corinth: Volumes 1-4. ISBN 0571130135, 0571154662, 0571125492, 057119382X.
- Price, R. M (translator). A History of the Monks of Syria by Theodoret of Cyrrhus. ISBN 0879079886.
- St. Paisius Monastery. Matericon: Instructions of Abba Isaiah to the Honorable Nun Theodora with an Introduction by St. Theophan the Recluse.
- Strohmeier, John, ed. St. Antony of Egypt: The Holy Life and Teachings of the First Desert Father. ISBN 0-9725200-6-6.
- Swan, Laura. The Forgotten Desert Mothers: Sayings, Lives, and Stories of Early Christian Women. ISBN 0-8091-4016-0.
- Waddell, Helen. The Desert Fathers. ISBN 0-375-70019-6.
- Ward, Benedicta (translator). The Desert Fathers: Sayings of the Early Christian Monks. ISBN 0-14-044731-8.
- Ward, Benedicta. Discernment in the Desert Fathers: Diakrisis in the Life and Thought of Early Egyptian Monasticism. ISBN 978-1-55635-339-0.
- Ward, Benedicta (translator). The Sayings of the Desert Fathers. ISBN 0-87907-959-2.
- Ward, Benedicta. The Wisdom of the Desert Fathers: The Apophthegmata Patrum. ISBN 0-7283-0034-6.
- Ward, Benedicta. The Wisdom of the Desert Fathers. ISBN 0-7459-3975-9.
- Ward, Benedicta; Russell, Norman. Lives of the Desert Fathers: The Historia Monachorum in Aegypto. ISBN 0-87907-934-7.
- Ward, Benedicta; Bloom, Anthony. The Wisdom of the Desert Fathers. ISBN 0-7283-0109-1.
- Wisdom of the Desert Fathers (1979). Eastern Orthodox Books. ISBN 0-89981-108-6.
- Wortley, John (translator). The Book of the Elders: Sayings of the Desert Fathers: The Systematic Collection. ISBN 0879072016.
- Wortley, John (translator). The Anonymous Sayings of the Desert Fathers: A Select Edition and Complete English Translation. ISBN 0521509882.
- Wortley, John (translator). The Lausiac History. ISBN 9780879072520.

== Partial list of Desert Fathers ==
A partial list of Desert Fathers:

- Abraham of Scetis
- Achilles
- Agathon of Scetis
- Aio
- Alonius
- Amoun of Nitria
- Ammonas of Egypt
- Ammonathas
- Andrew
- Anoub
- Anthony the Great
- Apollo the Shepherd
- Appby
- Ares
- Arsenius the Great
- Basil the Great
- Bessarion of Egypt
- Benjamin
- Biare
- Carion the Egyptian
- Chaeremon of Nitria
- Cronius of Nitria
- Cyrus
- Daniel of Scetis
- Dioscorus
- Doulas
- Elias the Hermit
- Ephrem the Syrian
- Epiphanius of Salamis
- Eucharistus the Secular
- Eudaimon
- Eulogius the Priest
- Euprepius of Egypt
- Euthymius the Great
- Evagrius Ponticus
- Gelasius of Nilopolis
- Gerontias
- Gregory the Theologian
- Heraclides
- Hierax
- Hilarion
- Hyperechios
- Isaac of Nineveh
- Isaac of the Cells
- Isaac the Theban
- Isaiah of Gaza
- Ischyrion
- Isidore of Pelusium
- Isidore of Scetes
- James
- John Cassian
- John of Egypt
- John the Cenobite
- John the Dwarf
- John the Theban
- John the Eunuch
- Joseph of Panephysis
- Joseph the Theban
- Longinus
- Lot of Egypt
- Lucius the Ascetic
- Macarius of Alexandria
- Macarius the Great
- Moses the Black
- Nilus of Sinai
- Nonnus
- Onuphrius
- Or of Nitria
- Orsisius
- Pachomius the Great
- Pambo
- Paphnutius of Thebes
- Paphnutius the Ascetic
- Paul the Great
- Paul the Simple
- Pior
- Pishoy
- Pitirim of Porphyry
- Philemon of Egypt
- Poemen
- Serapion of Thmuis
- Serapion the Sindonite
- Silvanus of Gaza
- Sisoes the Great
- Spyridon
- Theodore of Eleutheropolis
- Theodore of Enaton
- Theodore of Pherme
- Theodore of Scetis
- Theodorus of Tabennese
- Theonas
- Theophilus the Archbishop
- Zachariah the Recluse
- Zeno of Gaza

== In arts ==
Painting (with Sassetta, Paolo Uccello in The Tebaid, Hieronymus Bosch in the Triptych of the Temptation of St. Anthony, and Mathis Grünewald in the Isenheim Altarpiece, to mention only the most famous), literature (with Gustave Flaubert, Anatole France in Le Jongleur de Notre Dame, and Luca Desiato), music (with Paul Hindemith and Ottorino Respighi) have been inspired by their lives, sometimes capturing only the picturesque or folkloristic aspects: the temptations, the little devils, the little monsters that populate the paintings of apothegms.

== See also ==
- Anchorite
- Cappadocian Fathers
- Christian monasticism before 451
- Christian contemplation § Theoria
- Church Fathers
- Coptic monasticism
- Chronology of early Christian monasticism
- Desert Mothers
- Early Christianity
- Eastern Christian monasticism
- Fools for Christ
- Isaac the Syrian: The Ascetical Homilies of Isaac the Syrian
- Lavra, form of desert monasticism from Judaean Desert
- Pachomian monasteries
- Sinaites in Serbia
- Therapeutae, monastic sect near Alexandria
