= Historia monachorum in Aegypto =

Anonymous Ancient Greek saints' lives

The Historia monachorum in Aegypto, also called the Lives of the Desert Fathers, is a combination travelogue and hagiography from the late 4th century AD. It recounts the travels of a band of seven Palestinian monks on a pilgrimage through Egypt between September 394 and January 395. They travelled from south to north, stopping in monasteries and meeting hermits and holy men. The Historia is in essence a collection of stories about these men and their miracles.

The Historia is anonymous. It was originally written in Greek. Its original title is Ἡ κατ’ Αἴγυπτον τῶν μοναχῶν ἱστορία, which translates "Inquiry about the Monks of Egypt". It was translated into Latin at an early date by Rufinus of Aquileia, who also added material of his own. It is best known by the Latin title of Rufinus' edition, which is often misleadingly translated "History of the Monks of Egypt", but the work is not historiography. It was one of the most popular hagiographical texts throughout the Middle Ages. Four distinct translations into Syriac are known, as are translations into Georgian, Slavonic, Armenian and Arabic. A Coptic translation is known only from fragments. There are critical editions of both the Greek and Latin texts.

The Greek Historia has a prologue, epilogue and 26 chapters:

1. John of Lycopolis
2. Or of Nitria
3. Ammon
4. Bes
5. Oxyrhynchus
6. Theon
7. Elias
8. Apollo of Hermopolis
9. Ammonas of Egypt
10. Copres and Patermuthius
11. Sourous
12. Helle
13. Apelles and John
14. Paphnutius
15. Pitirim of Porphyry
16. Eulogius
17. Isidore
18. Sarapion of Egypt
19. Apollonius
20. Dioscorus and the monks of Nitria
21. Macarius of Egypt
22. Amun
23. Macarius of Alexandria
24. Paul the Simple
25. Piammonas
26. John

== Bibliography ==
- Cain, Andrew (2016). The Greek Historia monachorum in Aegypto: Monastic Hagiography in the Late Fourth Century. Oxford: Oxford University Press.
- Cain, Andrew, ed. (2019). Rufinus of Aquileia. Inquiry About the Monks in Egypt. The Fathers of the Church: A New Translation, Vol. 139. Washington, DC: The Catholic University of America Press.
- Festugière, André-Jean, ed. (1971). Historia monachorum in Aegypto: Édition critique du texte grec et traduction annotée. Brussels.
- Guillaumont, Antoine (1991). "Historia Monachorum in Aegypto". In Aziz Suryal Atiya (ed.). The Coptic Encyclopedia. Vol. 7. New York: Macmillan Publishers. cols. 1237b–1238b.
- Harmless, J. William (2018). "Historia Monachorum in Aegypto (History of the Monks in Egypt)". In Nicholson, Oliver (ed.). The Oxford Dictionary of Late Antiquity, Volume 1: A–I. Oxford: Oxford University Press. p. 728. ISBN 978-0-19-881624-9.
- Russell, Norman, ed. (1981). The Lives of the Desert Fathers: The Historia Monachorum in Aegypto. Kalamazoo: Cistercian Publications.
- Schulz-Flügel, Eva, ed. (1990). Tyrannius Rufinus. Historia monachorum sive De vita sanctorum patrum. Berlin: DeGruyter. doi:10.1515/9783110886313. ISBN 978-3-11-012040-0.
- Ward, Benedicta (1981). "Introduction". The Lives of the Desert Fathers: The Historia Monachorum in Aegypto. Kalamazoo: Cistercian Publications.
