= Vitae Patrum =

Any collection of desert father stories

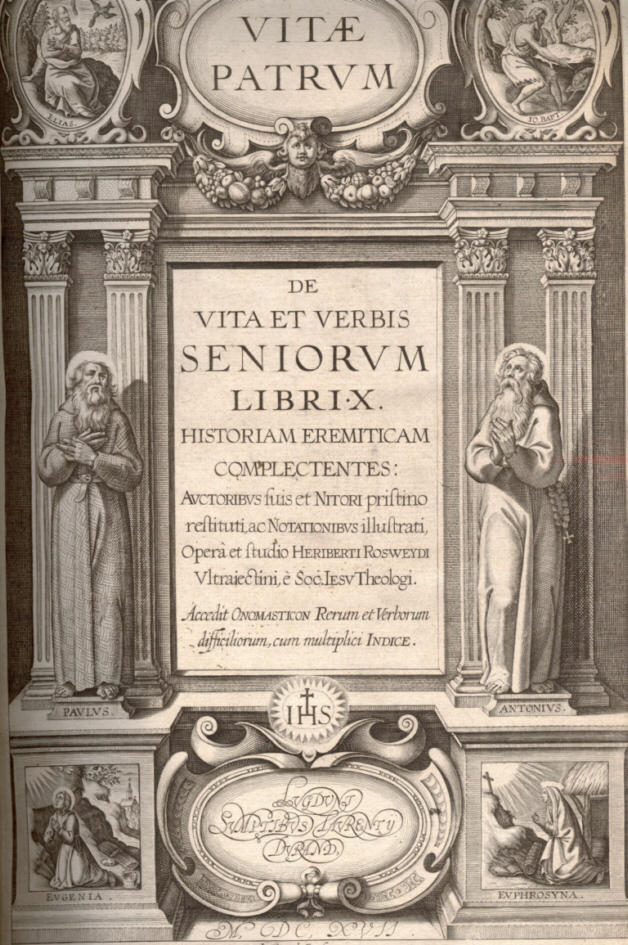
Cover of the 1615 first edition of the Vitae Patrum by Heribert Rosweyde

The Vitae Patrum or Vitas Patrum (literally Lives of the Fathers) is a collection of hagiographical writings on the Desert Fathers and Desert Mothers of early Christianity.

== Latin tradition ==
The earliest works that came to be part of the Vitae Patrum were composed in the 4th century, mostly in Greek. Between the 4th and 7th centuries, they were translated into Latin and the collections came to be known as Vitae Patrum. Which works were included under this title varied considerably, and Monika Studer refers to the Vitae as "a variable corpus of narratives".

The original collection was just a group of the three biographies of desert monks by Jerome. The biographies of Paul of Thebes, Hilarion and Malchus of Syria were originally composed in Latin between 370 and 390.

Jerome's biographies belong to the legends or vitae proper, one of three types of work found in the collection. The other types are:

- The 4th-century Greek travelogues known as the Historia monachorum in Aegypto and the Lausiac History by Palladius of Galatia. The former was translated into Latin in the late 4th century by Rufinus of Aquileia and the latter was translated in the 6th century.
- The Sayings of the Desert Fathers, translated into Latin in the 6th and 7th centuries and usually known under the title Verba seniorum.

== Vernacular editions ==
Das Väterbuch is partially a German translation from around 1280.

An Italian vernacular translation was made by Dominican friar Domenico Cavalca from Pisa at the beginning of the fourteenth century.

== Rosweyde's edition ==
A printed edition, edited by the Jesuit Heribert Rosweyde, was printed by Balthazar Moret in 1615. The book is a significant part of the much broader work, Acta Sanctorum.

The Vitae Patrum is based on extensive research by Rosweyde into all the available literature he could find on the early desert monastics. Hippolyte Delehaye described the work as "the epic of the origins of monasticism in Egypt and Syria, an epic unsurpassed in interest and grandeur." In the thirteenth century, a version of Vitae Patrum had been translated into Latin. It was such a popular book that numerous versions and editions were published, with extensive changes and variations in the stories. Rosweyde based his book on twenty-three different versions of those earlier books, studying, dating, and classifying all the different versions and changes.

Rosweyde's Vitae Patrum consists of ten books. Book I has the lives of sixteen saints under the title Vitae virorum and eleven saints under the title Vitae mulierum, beginning with St. Paul the Hermit and St. Anthony of the Desert, and including women saints such as Saint Mary the Harlot. Books II, Historia monachorum, and III, Verba seniorum (Sayings of the Elders), are attributed to Rufinus, who was later found to be only their translator. Book IV is a compilation of writings by Sulpicius Severus and John Cassian. Book V is another collection of Verba seniorum from Latin and Greek by Pelagius.

Book VI and Book VII are further collections of Verba Seniorum (Sayings of the Elders) by unknown Greek authors translated by John the subdeacon, possibly Pope John III, and by Paschasius of Dumium. Book VIII is a text that was previously known as The Paradise of Heraclides, but which Rosweyde attributed to its real author, Palladius, and titled the Lausiac History. Book IX is De Vitis Patrum by Theodoret. Book X is The Spiritual Meadow of Moschus. Rosweyde wrote an introduction to each book.

== See also ==
- Asceticon
- Collectio Monastica
