= Joseph of Panephysis =

Egyptian Christian monk

Saint Joseph of Panephysis

Desert Father Venerable, Anchorite
- Born: Thmuis, Egypt
- Residence: Scetes
- Died: Egypt
- Venerated in: Eastern Orthodox Church; Coptic Orthodox Church
- Feast: 17 June

Joseph of Panephysis, Joseph of Panepho, or Joseph the Anchorite was an Egyptian Christian monk who lived around the 4th and 5th centuries in the desert of Lower Egypt. He was one of the Desert Fathers and was a contemporary for Abbas Poemen and Lot, who sometimes consulted him.

== Biography ==
Joseph was born in Thmuis, Egypt and lived as an anchorite in Panephysis in eastern Egypt. There, he was visited by John Cassian, who mentioned him in the Conferences.

== Veneration ==
He is venerated as a saint in the Eastern Orthodox Church and in Coptic Orthodox tradition. His feast day is on 17 June.
