= Isaiah the Solitary =

Christian monk and abbot

Saint Isaiah the Solitary

Abba
- Born: c. 4th century AD
- Died: 11 August 491 AD; Gaza
- Venerated in: Eastern Orthodox Church; Oriental Orthodox Church; Roman Catholic Church
- Feast: 3 July
- Tradition or genre: Desert Fathers

Isaiah the Solitary (born c. 4th century AD – died 11 August 491), also known as Isaiah of Gaza, Isaias the Solitary, Abba Isaiah, or possibly also Isaiah of Scetis, was a Christian ascetic and monastic writer known from the Sayings of the Desert Fathers and various Palestinian Miaphysite sources. He is canonized as a saint by the Coptic Orthodox Church, with his feast day on the 11th day of the month Abib (Epip) in the Coptic calendar.

His work "On Guarding the Intellect" can be found in the Philokalia.

== Life ==
Although he was active in Gaza (as he was quoted by Barsanuphius of Gaza), Isaiah was a product of the Egyptian monasticism which had developed in the 4th century in the Kellia (Cells) of the desert of Scetes, where he was first a monk during the early 400s. There, he lived on a mountain and moved then to Palestine. Isaiah was influential in the development of Christianity in Palestine. He was also in contact with intellectuals of the city of Gaza such as Aeneas of Gaza, one of the members of the Rhetorical School of Gaza, who consulted him in regard to the philosophical writings of Plato, Aristotle and Plontius. He also became a close friend of Peter the Iberian and the two would meet periodically. He died as a hermit in a monastery near Gaza on 11 August 491.

== Writings ==
Many of Isaiah's works have been lost. The Asceticon, a collection of about 30 discourses on Christian asceticism, was especially popular in the Eastern Orthodox monastic tradition, and has survived in many translations in Syriac (6th century), Coptic (6th century), Ethiopic (8th century, translation from Coptic), Armenian (8th century), Arabic, and Georgian (of which only logoi 3, 7, 23, and 27 have survived). The Syriac version of his Asceticon, which is only a partial translation of the original Greek text, has been translated into French.

Excerpts of his writings are also included in the Philokalia. His work the 'Book on Religious Exercises and Quiet' is also available in English.

== Isaiah of Scetis ==
Some scholars suggest that Isaiah of Gaza and Isaiah of Scetis were in fact two different people, with the Asceticon first written by Isaiah of Scetis (d. early 5th century) and later edited by Isaiah of Gaza (d. 491).
