= Asceticon =

Christian monastic text

The Asceticon ("ascetic discourses") by Abba Isaiah of Scetis is a diverse anthology of essays by an Egyptian Christian monk who left Scetis around 450 AD.

== Contents ==
Originally composed in Greek, the Asceticon consists of 30 essays ("logos" in singular, "logoi" in plural) on subjects including: advice for novice monks; precepts for those who have renounced the world; sayings and stories by Abba Isaiah; various letters, sermons, and sayings. Logos 30 includes several sayings that were also included in the Apophthegmata Patrum (Sayings of the Desert Fathers), but in a different form, giving scholars some evidence on how those sayings evolved into their final form in the Apophthegmata Patrum. Abba Isaiah was also influential in bringing Christianity to Palestine.

The 29 discourses in John Chryssavgis's translation of the Asceticon are:

1. Rules for the brothers who live with him
2. On the natural state of the intellect
3. On the condition of beginners and anchorites
4. On the conscience of those who stay in their cells
5. Faithful commandments for the edification of those who wish to live peacefully together
6. On those who desire to lead a life of good silence
7. On virtues
8. Sayings
9. Commands for those who have renounced (the world)
10. Another discourse
11. On the grain of mustard seed
12. On wine
13. On those who have struggled and reached perfection
14. Acts of mourning
15. On detachment
16. On the joy that comes to the soul that desires to serve God
17. On thoughts about renunciation and exile
18. On forgiveness
19. On passions
20. On humility
21. On repentance
22. On the conduct of the new person
23. On perfection
24. On tranquillity
25. To Abba Peter, his disciple
26. Recorded by Isaiah's disciple, Abba Peter, who had heard it spoken by his master
27. In which he says, "attend diligently"
28. The branches of malice
29. Lamentations

== Sogdian fragments ==
The Asceticon was read and translated by the Nestorians of Central Asia. A Sogdian fragment of the 4th discourse, translated from Syriac, was found in MC C2, along with part of a commentary on the 15th discourse by Dadisho Qatraya.

== See also ==
- Apophthegmata Patrum
- Ethiopic Collectio Monastica
- Vitae Patrum

== Bibliography ==
- Chryssavgis, John and Pachomios (Robert) Penkett (eds). Abba Isaiah of Scetis: Ascetic Discourses. Kalamazoo, MI: Cistercian Publications, 2003. (English translation)
- de Broc, H. Isaïe de Scété: recueil ascétique, 2nd ed. Bégrolles-en-Mauges: Abbaye de Bellefontaine, 1985. (French translation)
- Draguet, René. Les cinq recensions de l'Ascéticon syriaque d'Abba Isaïe. Louvain: Secrétariat du Corpus SCO, 1968. [Pages 289–290 (Syriac text), 293–294 (Greek and Latin texts and French translation)]
