= Basilides and Potamiana =

Christian saints

Saints Saints Basilides and Potamiana

Martyrs
- Born: 2nd century Egypt
- Died: c. 205; Alexandria, Egypt
- Venerated in: Coptic Orthodox Church; Eastern Orthodox Churches; Oriental Orthodox Churches; Roman Catholic Church
- Attributes: Basilides is depicted as a soldier
- Patronage: rape victims (Potamiana); Polizia Penitenziaria (Basilides)

Basilides and Potamiaena (also Potamiana) were Christian martyrs now venerated as saints. Both died in Alexandria during the persecutions under Septimius Severus.

== Potamiana ==
Potamiana (died c. 205 AD), is venerated as a Christian saint and martyr. According to her legend, she, along with her mother Marcella, were arrested in Alexandria, Egypt, and Potamiaena was threatened with being handed over to gladiators to be abused, if she refused to renounce her Christianity. The judge regarded her response as impious and ordered their immediate death by fire. Boiling pitch was subsequently dripped over her body.

== Basilides ==
After Potamiana had been sentenced to death, Basilides, an officer of the court, led her to execution; on the way, he protected her against the insults of the mob. In return for his kindness Potamiana promised him not to forget him with her Lord when she reached her destination. Soon after Potamiana's death Basilides was asked by his fellow-soldiers to take a certain oath; on answering that he could not do it, as he was a Christian, at first they thought he was jesting, but seeing he was in earnest they denounced him and he was condemned to be beheaded.

While waiting in jail for his sentence to be carried out some Christians (Origen being possibly one of them) visited Basilides and asked him how he happened to be converted; he answered that three days after her death, Potamiana had appeared to him by night and placed a crown on his head as a pledge that the Lord would soon receive him into his glory. Basilides was then baptized and the next day he was beheaded.

== Account by Eusebius ==
Potamiana appeared to many other persons at that time, calling them to faith and martyrdom (Eusebius, Church History VI, iii-v). To these conversions, Origen, an eyewitness, testifies in his Contra Celsum (I, 46; P. G., XI, 746). The description of the episode of intercession of Potamiana on behalf of Basilides, narrated in Eusebius’ text, constitutes one of the first documents that concerns the intercession of saints.

Six Christians, students of Origen, were martyred at the same time. Eusebius describes the martyrdom of this group:

The first of these was Plutarch, who was mentioned just above. As he was led to death, the man of whom we are speaking being with him at the end of his life, came near being slain by his fellow citizens, as if he were the cause of his death. But the providence of God preserved him at this time also. After Plutarch, the second martyr among the pupils of Origen was Serenus, who gave through fire a proof of the faith which he had received. The third martyr from the same school was Heraclides, and after him the fourth was Hero. The former of these was as yet a catechumen, and the latter had but recently been baptized. Both of them were beheaded. After them, the fifth from the same school proclaimed as an athlete of piety was another Serenus, who, it is reported, was beheaded, after a long endurance of tortures. And of women, Herais died while yet a catechumen, receiving baptism by fire, as Origen himself somewhere says....Basilides may be counted the seventh of these. He led to martyrdom the celebrated Potamiæna, who is still famous among the people of the country for the many things which she endured for the preservation of her chastity and virginity. For she was blooming in the perfection of her mind and her physical graces. Having suffered much for the faith of Christ, finally after tortures dreadful and terrible to speak of, she with her mother, Marcella, was put to death by fire.

— Eusebius of Caesarea, Church History

== Veneration ==
The martyrdoms of Basilides, Potamiana, Marcella and six disciples of Origen are commemorated in the Martyrologium Hieronymianum on June 28. The Roman Martyrology commemorates them on June 28, but Basilides on June 30.

In Italy, on September 2, 1948, Basilides was declared patron saint of the Corpo degli Agenti di Custodia, today the Polizia Penitenziaria, the Prison Guards.

== See also ==
- Plutarch and companions
