= Hyperechios =

5th-century Christian monk and writer

Abba Hyperechios Hyperechius
- Residence: Egypt or Palestine
- Feast: August 7
- Tradition or genre: Desert Fathers
- Major works: Exhortation to the Monks (Παραίνεσις Ασκητών)

Hyperechios or Hyperechius (Greek: Ὑπερέχιος) was a Christian ascetic and monastic writer who was active during the late 4th century or early 5th century A.D. He most likely lived in Egypt or Roman Palestine. He is known from the Sayings of the Desert Fathers, as well as a collection of 160 sayings known as the Exhortation to the Monks (Greek: Παραίνεσις Ασκητών, romanized: Paraínesis Askētȏn).

== Name ==
The name Hyperéchios is derived from the Greek hyperéchein [hyperéchō], meaning, ‘to be above,’ ‘to rise over,’ or ‘to transcend.’

== Life ==
Very little is known about Hyperechios. Based on his writings, Vivian (2024) deduces that he was from an upper-middle class Greek-speaking family and lived close to an urban setting. He likely lived in a coastal city, which could have been Alexandria, Ashkelon, or even Tyre. Hyperechios would have lived sometime between the late 300s and the Council of Chalcedon in 451 A.D.

== Writings ==
The Exhortation to the Monks (Greek: Παραίνεσις Ασκητών, romanized: Paraínesis Askētȏn) is an alphabetically organized compilation of 160 maxims from Hyperechios. The Greek text of the Exhortation is can be found in the Patrologia Graeca (volume 79, pp. 1472-1489). An English translation was published by Tim Vivian in 2024.

Tirot (1991: 51–52) contains 18 more alphabetically organized sayings from MS Vatican grec 440 (12th century) and MS Cambridge, Trinity College, O.9.17 (11th–12th century).
