= Serapion of Thmuis =

Egyptian Christian monastic and saint

Saint Serapion of Thmuis
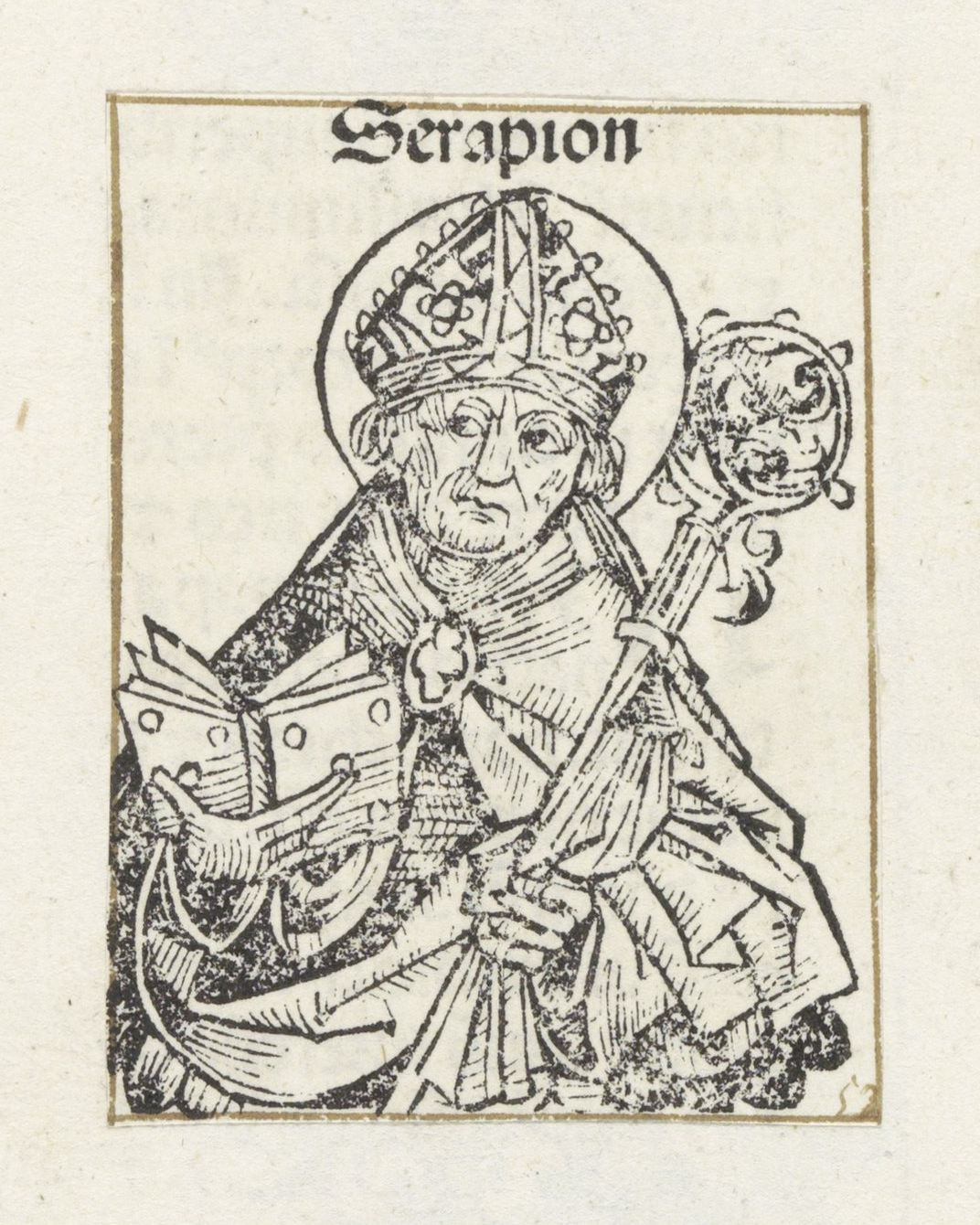
- Born: 300; Egypt (region)
- Hometown: Thmuis, modern day Tell el-Timai
- Residence: Nitria
- Died: c. 360; Nitria, Egypt
- Honored in: Eastern Orthodox Church; Coptic Church; Roman Catholic Church; Church of the East
- Feast: June 21 (Church of the East); March 7 (Coptic); March 21 (Eastern); March 21 (Roman Catholic)
- Attributes: Bishop of Thmuis, quoted in the Sayings of the Desert Fathers
- Influences: Anthony the Great
- Major works: Sacramentary of Serapion of Thmuis

Serapion or Sarapion (Greek: Σεραπίων, romanized: Serapíon; Russian: Серапион; fl. early 4th century), known as Serapion of Nitria, Serapion of Thmuis or Serapion the Scholastic, was an early Christian monk and bishop of Thmuis in Lower Egypt. He is notable for fighting alongside Athanasius of Alexandria against Arianism.

== Life ==
Serapion is quoted in four sections of the Sayings of the Desert Fathers, where he is called Abba Serapion. He was given the title "The Angel of the Church of Thmuis" by Evagrius Ponticus in Gnostikos.

=== Monasticism ===
Before becoming a monk, Serapion was educated in Alexandria. He then became the abbot of the Monastery of Arsina (Latin: Arseonita), which at one point held as many as eleven-thousand monks. He was given the title "the Great" by the early Christian historians Sozomen and Palladius.

As a monk, Serapion resided in Nitria (monastic site), Lower Egypt.

As a monk, he was a companion and disciple of Anthony the Great, who at his deathbed bequeathed to him one of his two sheepskin cloaks (the other went to Athanasius).

=== Episcopate ===
In his later life c. 339, he was made the bishop of Thmuis (near Diospolis) where he served until his death c. 358. Jerome in his work On Illustrous Men noted that Serapion was given the appellation "Scholasticus" (the Scholastic) because of his meticulous scholarship. During his episcopate, he helped Athanasius fight against Arianism in Alexandria, and at his request, Athanasius wrote to him a series of three dogmatic letters on the theology of the Holy Spirit. These letters, which were written c. 339–359, are considered to be among the earliest Christian texts dedicated exclusively to the Holy Spirit. Serapion was one of the most trusted companions of Athanasius and even took care of his episcopal see during one of his exiles. In AD 353, Athanasius placed Serapion at the head of a delegation to Emperor Constantius II to plead guilty against the charges of the Arians. In 343, Serapion attended the Council of Serdica. Serapion was exiled by the Arians in AD 350, and died c. 360.

=== Story from the Sayings of the Desert Fathers ===
Serapion is said to have paid a prostitute, but instead of engaging in relations with her, prayed all night in front of her and eventually converted her to Christianity. She later became a nun at a monastery, practicing extreme ascetic labors. The same story also exists in a poetic Hymn of Praise in The Prologue of Ohrid.

=== Extant Works ===
Only a few of Serapion's works have come down to us. The Sacramentary ascribed to him was not authored originally by him, but rather seems to be Serapion preserving the liturgical tradition of Thmuis. Fitschen discusses fragments of various writings in addition to the complete extant works listed below. Fitschen had concluded that Serapion did not author the Letter to the Monks but Herbel offers a correction on this front, arguing for Serapion's authorship. Both Herbel and Fitschen agree that Serapion did not author the Letter Concerning the Father and the Son, which is appended to the Sacramentary, and may date to the beginning of the Arian controversy. An Arabic Life of Anthony has also been attributed to Serapion but it is a much later redaction. It is possible that Serapion is the author of part or all of the LIfe of Anthony, credited to Athanasius, but Serapion's role as redactor and/or author warrants further exploration.

== List of Extant works ==
- Sacramentary of Serapion of Thmuis (a prayer book which includes the earliest written Sanctus).
- Treatise against the Manichees.
- A Letter to the Disciples of Anthony (written after Anthony's death in 356. First published in the 1950s, exists only in Syriac and Armenian).
- A Letter to Bishop Eudoxius.
- A Letter to the Monks.

== Selected quotes ==
- "Do not think that sickness is difficult; only sin is difficult. Sickness follows the sinners only in life, but sin follows the sinner into the grave." (Sayings of the Desert Fathers). This is found in his Letter to Bishop Eudoxius.
- "When the soldiers of the emperor are standing at attention, they cannot look to the right or left; it is the same for the man who stands before God and looks towards Him in fear at all time; he cannot then fear anything from the enemy." (Sayings of the Desert Fathers).
- "As soon as this earth's great elder, the blessed Antony, who prayed for the whole world, departed, everything has been torn apart and is in anguish, and the wrath devastates Egypt. While he was truly on earth, he extended his hands and prayed and spoke with God all day long. He did not let the wrath descend on us. Lifting up his thoughts, he kept it from coming down. But now that those hands are closed, no one else can be found who might halt the violence." (A Letter to the Disciples of Anthony).

== See also ==
- Desert Fathers
- Athanasius of Alexandria
- Anthony the Great
- Thmuis
- Sayings of the Desert Fathers
