= Serapion the Sindonite =

Egyptian Christian Monk

Saint Serapion the Sindonite
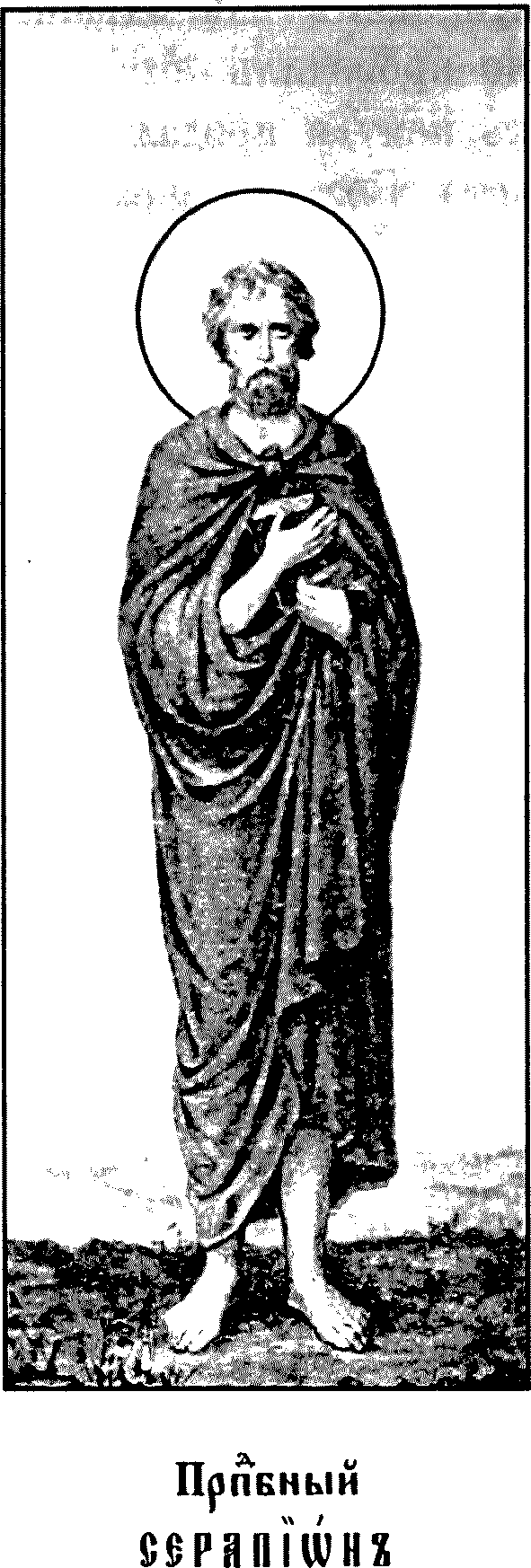

Desert Father, Venerable
- Born: c. 3rd century AD; Egypt
- Died: 356 AD; Egypt
- Honored in: Eastern Orthodox Church; Oriental Orthodox Church; Roman Catholic Church
- Feast: 7 April (Orthodox Church); 21 March (Catholic Church)

Serapion the Sindonite (c. 3rd century AD – 356 AD) was a Christian monk from Egypt who is considered a saint by the Eastern Orthodox Church, Oriental Orthodox Church, and the Roman Catholic Church. His feast day is on 7 April in the Orthodox Church. He is inscribed on the Roman Martyrology for 21 March.

== Life ==
Serapion was an Egyptian monk who was noted for his severely ascetic practices. He lived at a time when monasticism was starting to flourish in the Egyptian wilderness.

According to Alban Butler,

He was called the Sindonite, from a single garment of coarse linen which he always wore. He was a native of Egypt. Exceeding great was the austerity of his penitential life. Though he travelled into several countries, he always lived in the same poverty, mortification, and recollection.

In a certain town, commiserating the spiritual blindness of an idolater, who was also a comedian, he sold himself to him for twenty pieces of money. His only sustenance in this servitude was bread and water. He acquitted himself at the same time of every duty belonging to his condition with the utmost diligence and fidelity, joining with his labour assiduous prayer and meditation. Having converted his master and the whole family to the faith, and induced him to quit the stage, he was made free by him, but could not be prevailed upon to keep for his own use, or even to distribute to the poor, the twenty pieces of coin he had received as the price of his liberty.

Soon after this he sold himself a second time, to relieve a distressed widow. Having spent some time with his new master, in recompense of signal spiritual services, besides his liberty, he also received a cloak, a tunic, or under-garment, and a book of the gospels. He had scarcely gone out of doors, when, meeting a poor man, he bestowed on him his cloak; and shortly after to another starving with cold, he gave his tunic; and was thus reduced again to his single linen garment. Being asked by a stranger who it was that had stripped him and left him in that naked condition, showing his book of the gospels, he said: “This it is that hath stripped me.” Not long after, he sold the book itself for the relief of a person in extreme distress. Being met by an old acquaintance, and asked what was become of it, he said: “Could you believe it? this gospel seemed continually to cry to me: Go, sell all thou hast, and give to the poor. Wherefore I have also sold it, and given the price to the indigent members of Christ.”

Having nothing now left but his own person, he disposed of that again on several other occasions, where the corporal or spiritual necessities of his neighbour called for relief: once to a certain Manichee at Lacedæmon, whom he served for two years, and before they were expired, brought both him and his whole family over to the true faith. St. John the Almoner having read the particulars of this history, called for his steward, and said to him, weeping: “Can we flatter ourselves that we do any great matters because we give our estates to the poor? Here is a man who could find means to give himself to them, and so many times over.

St. Serapion went from Lacedæmon to Rome, there to study the most perfect models of virtue, and, returning afterwards into Egypt, died in the desert, being sixty years old, some time before Palladius visited Egypt in 388. Henschenius, in his Notes on the Life of St. Auxentius, 1 and Bollandus 2 take notice that in certain Menæa he is honoured on the 21st of March; yet they have not given his acts on that day. Baronius confounds him with St. Serapion, the Sidonian martyr.

== Sources ==
- Butler, Alban (1798), The Lives of the Primitive Fathers, Martyrs, and Other Principal Saints, vol. III, J. Moir
- "St. Serapion the Sindonite", Catholic online
