= Apollo the Shepherd =

4th-century Egyptian Christian monk

- Born: Egypt
- Died: Egypt
- Venerated in: Coptic Orthodox Church
- Feast: 5 Amshir

Apollo the Shepherd was an Egyptian Christian monk who lived around the 4th century AD in the desert of Lower Egypt. He was one of the Desert Fathers.

== Legend ==
Apollo was initially a shepherd. He is said to have killed his pregnant wife and unborn child when he was curious to see what the unborn fetus would have looked like. When they died, he repented and became a monk. According to the Ethiopian Synaxarion, he lived deep in the interior of the desert for 14 years. After the 14 years were over, an angel took him to meet one of the Desert Fathers, who told him that his sins had been forgiven. The father gave the Eucharist to Apollo, who then died in the father's arms and ascended to heaven.

== Feast day ==
Apollo is venerated as a saint by the Coptic Orthodox Church. In the Coptic calendar, his feast day is the 5th day of Meshir (or Amshir in Arabic), which is the same feast day as that of Saint Apollo of Bawit.
