= Hierax (ascetic) =

Hierax (Ancient Greek: Ἱέραξ), or Hieracas, was a learned ascetic who flourished about the end of the 3rd century AD at Leontopolis in Egypt, where he lived to the age of ninety, supporting himself by calligraphy and devoting his leisure to scientific and literary pursuits, especially to the study of the Bible.

He was the author of Biblical commentaries both in Greek and Coptic, and is said to have composed many hymns. He became leader of the so-called sect of the Hieracites, an ascetic society from which married persons were excluded, and of which one of the leading tenets was that only the celibate could enter the kingdom of heaven. He asserted that the suppression of the sexual impulse was emphatically the new revelation brought by the Logos, and appealed to 1 Cor. vii., Heb. xii. 14, and Matt. xix. 12, xxv. 21.

Hierax may be called the connecting link between Origen and the Coptic monks. A man of deep learning and prodigious memory, he seems to have developed Origen's Christology in the direction of Athanasius. He held that the Son was a torch lighted at the torch of the Father, that Father and Son are a bipartite light. He repudiated the ideas of a bodily resurrection and a material paradise, and on the ground of 2 Tim. ii. 5 questioned the salvation of even baptized infants, "for without knowledge no conflict, without conflict no reward."

In his insistence on virginity as the specifically Christian virtue he set up the great theme of the church of the 4th and 5th centuries.

== Quotes ==
Quotes attributed to Hierax from the Sayings of the Desert Fathers:

A brother questioned Abba Hierax saying, "Give me a word. How can I be saved?"
The old man said to him, "Sit in your cell, and if you are hungry, eat, if you are thirsty, drink; only do not speak evil of anyone, and you will be saved."

— Saying 1, Page 104

[Abba Hierax] also said, "I have never uttered, or wished to hear, a worldly remark."

— Saying 2, Page 105
