= Gelasius of Nilopolis =

Eastern Orthodox Christian saint

Saint Gelasius of Nilopolis

Desert Father, Venerable
- Born: Egypt
- Residence: Nilopolis
- Died: c. 5th century AD; Egypt
- Venerated in: Eastern Orthodox Church
- Feast: 31 December

Gelasius of Nilopolis (died c. 5th century AD) was an Egyptian Christian abbot who lived during the 5th century. His feast day is on 31 December. He was one of the Desert Fathers and served as an abbot in Nilopolis during the mid-5th century.

Gelasius was a strong supporter of Juvenal of Jerusalem and adhered to the Council of Chalcedon.

Gelasius of Nilopolis is venerated as a saint in the Eastern Orthodox Church.
