= Collectio Monastica =

5th-century Ethiopic Christian text

The Collectio Monastica ("Monastic Collection") is an Ethiopic book that includes some original sayings of the Desert Fathers and which is textually independent of the better-known Apophthegmata Patrum (Sayings of the Desert Fathers). It was first published by Victor Arras in 1963, based on two separate manuscripts that were likely based on Greek language or Coptic sources.

The collection consists of sixty-eight chapters of widely different lengths. Included in the book are collections of Desert Father sayings, most of which have no parallel in the Apophthegmata Patrum. The original work appears to have been written by a fifth-century monk who either lived with the Desert Fathers at Scetis, or knew the monks who lived there. He also appears to have known Abba Poemen, because of several unique stories and sayings attributed to him.

== Translations ==
English translation:

- Victor Arras, ed., Collectio monastica, CSCO 238 [with the Ethiopic text] and CSCO 239 [with a Latin translation] (Louvain: Secrétariat du Corpus SCO, 1963).

French translations:

- Lucien Regnault, Les Sentences des Pères du Désert, nouveau recueil: apophtegmes inédits ou inconnus (Sablésur-Sarthe: Solesmes, 1970), 287–331. [another partial French translation in p. 332–338]
- Victor Arras, ed., Patericon aethiopice, CSCO 277 [Ethiopic text] and CSCO 278 [Latin translation] (Louvain: Secrétariat du Corpus SCO, 1967).

== See also ==
- Apophthegmata Patrum
- Asceticon
- Vitae Patrum
