= Daniel of Scetis =

4th-century Egyptian Christian monk

Daniel
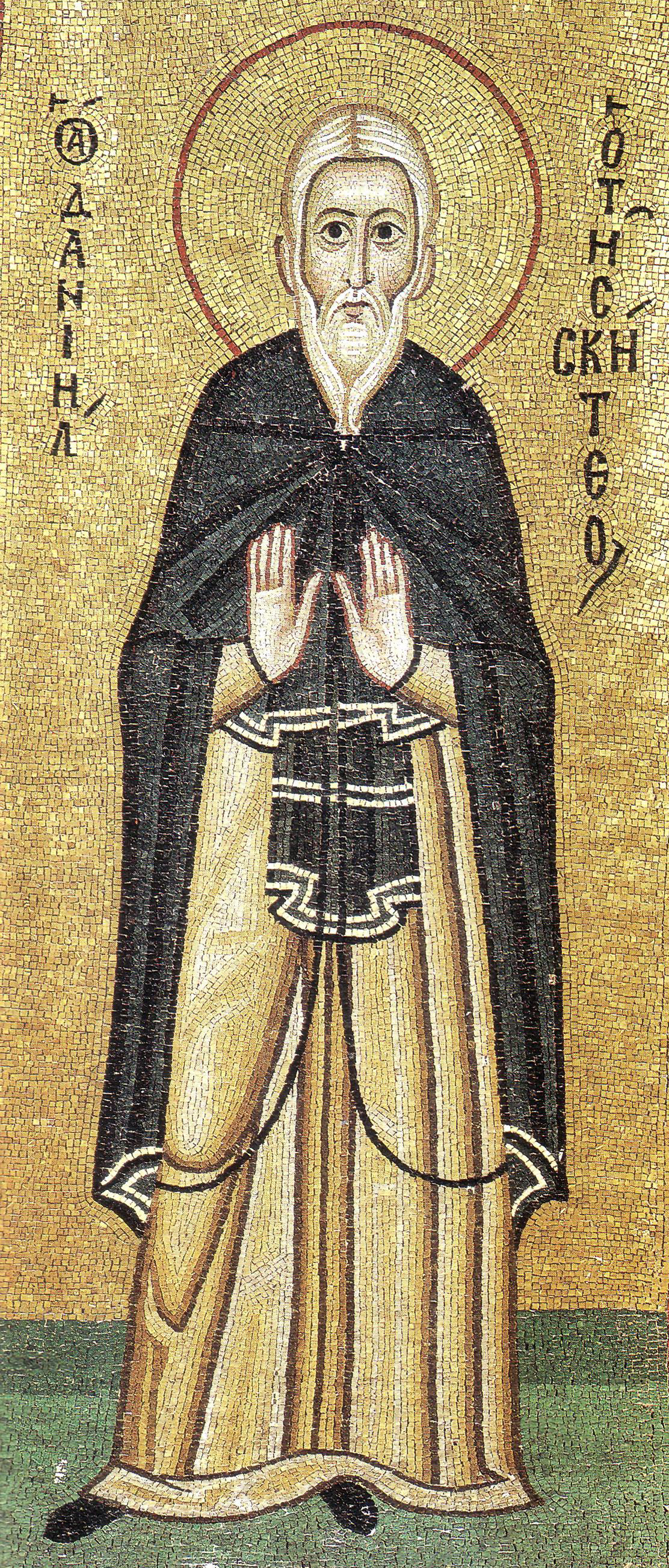
- Mosaic from Hosios Loukas
- Born: Egypt
- Residence: Scetes
- Died: Egypt
- Venerated in: Eastern Orthodox Church; Oriental Orthodox Church; Roman Catholic Church; Church of the East
- Canonized: Pre-Congregation

Daniel was an Egyptian Christian monk who lived around the 4th century in the desert of Lower Egypt. He is considered a Desert Father.

He was a disciple and biographer of Arsenius the Great. Daniel was a disciple of Arsenius up to his death in 449 A.D.

== Accounts ==
Daniel was born in Egypt sometime during the 4th century AD. As a monk, he spent 40 years in a cenobium before practicing asceticism alone. Some sources about his life vary on details, others give varying accounts of different events in his life. One story tells of how he was continuously kidnapped by bandits, managing to escape each time, until the last occasion when he knocked his kidnapper out with a rock and fled. Going to Alexandria later to repent, a certain Archbishop Timothy rebuked him for taking matters into his own hands and not trusting God, who had saved him the first times. Nonetheless, he let him go, stating that he did not commit murder but rather "killed a wild beast." He went to Rome, Constantinople, Ephesus, Jerusalem, and Antioch, and all the bishops told him the same. He returned to Alexandria and, overwhelmed by guilt, confessed this act to the magistrate's court, for which he was jailed for 30 days until the court delivered his confession to the magistrate. After his release, he was interviewed by the magistrate, who let him go, telling him, "Go, pray for me, abba. If only you had 'murdered' seven more of them!" Overwhelmed with joy, Abba Daniel took an oath to care for a leper for the rest of his life, in gratitude to God for pardoning his sin of murder. He dedicated himself to the manual effort of tirelessly caring for the leper, whose disease was so advanced that Daniel had to knead the food for him and manually feed him.

Another account in Syriac relates a story that Abba Daniel had told his disciples. A man in Alexandria left his sister to pursue a monastic life in the desert. Soon after, the sister turned to a life of prostitution to get by. The monks of the man's monastery pressured him to go after his sister and put an end to her ordeal, to which he replied, "How can I rebuke those who are better than me? For I do not know of anyone at all whose sins are as many as mine." Still, the monks insisted that he go to his sister, lest her sin be upon him, prompting him to fearfully make his way back to Alexandria.

Before reaching the city, an acquaintance saw him approaching and ran to tell his sister. The sister, already with a man at that point and dressed in loose clothing, felt extreme shame and fear, and left immediately to meet her brother at the city gates. The brother asked her why she was doing that, to which she replied that she had no other means to get by and felt greatly hopeless, her sins perceived as too great to be forgiven by God. The brother then quoted scripture to her, with Jesus saying, "I did not come to call the holy, but the sinners to repentance." At that, the sister pledged to dedicate the rest of her life to God in prayer, worship, and meditation.

She immediately got dressed and made her way to the monastery in the desert, not minding the rough road lacerating her bare feet. Seeing some people coming in their direction, the brother ordered his sister to distance herself, lest they think a monk was with a strange woman. So she disappeared, and once the people had moved on, she was nowhere to be found. The brother followed the trail of blood to find her lifeless corpse. He mourned her greatly, especially at how he was unable to save her soul. He started to dig a grave but fell asleep, and had a vision of various men attempting to take his sister for themselves. An angel suddenly appeared and rebuked the men, saying, "Do not touch her until her repentance comes too." Soon after, another angel showed up with a box holding her tears and repentance, placing it on a scale against her sins. The box of repentance outweighed the sins, and all the men left in shame.

The brother then woke up and joyfully buried his sister, knowing her repentance had saved her soul. He hurried back to the monastery and told Abba Daniel these things, and all the monks of the monastery rejoiced at this story, giving glory to God "who does not spurn those who repent, but glorifies those who glorify Him."
