= Zachariah the Recluse =

- Born: c. 4th century Egypt
- Residence: Scetes
- Died: c. 4th century Egypt
- Venerated in: Roman Catholic Church, Eastern Orthodox Church
- Feast: March 24

Venerable Zachariah the Recluse of Egypt was an Egyptian Christian monk who lived during the 4th century in Scetis, Lower Egypt. He is the patron saint of society's outcasts. He served the homeless and poor, and is remembered as a monastic father.

His father, Carion the Egyptian, left his wife and two children to become a monk in Scetis. Zacharias was later sent to Scetis to become a monk with his father during a famine.

Venerable Zachariah the Recluse is commemorated 24 March in the Eastern Orthodox Church.

== See also ==
- Hermit
- Poustinia
- Desert Fathers
- Coptic Orthodox Church
