= Pior =

Saint Pior Hermit
- Born: 3rd century Egypt
- Died: 4th century Egypt
- Feast: 17 June

Saint Pior (or Prior; 4th century) was an Egyptian monk and hermit in the desert of Scetis, one of the Desert Fathers, and a disciple of Anthony the Great. He lived to a great age. His feast day is 17 June.

== Monks of Ramsgate account ==
The Monks of Ramsgate wrote in their Book of Saints (1921),

Pior (St.) Hermit. (June 17)
(4th cent.) A disciple of Saint Antony in Egypt, and one of the Fathers of the Desert venerated in the East.

Prior (St.) Hermit. (June 17)
(4th cent.) An Egyptian, one of the first disciples of Saint Antony. He died at the end of the fourth century, being then nearly one hundred years old.

== Butler's account ==
The hagiographer Alban Butler (1710–1773) wrote in his Lives of the Fathers, Martyrs, and Other Principal Saints under June 17,

On this day the Greeks honour St Prior, Hermit, who was a native of Egypt, and one of the first disciples of St. Antony. He died towards the end of the fourth century, and was about one hundred years of age. See the Bollandists.

== Baring-Gould's account ==
Sabine Baring-Gould (1834–1924) in his Lives Of The Saints wrote under June 17,

S. PIOR, H.
(end of 4th cent.)
[Greek Menæa. Authority :—Palladius, in his Lives of the Fathers of the Desert, and S. Ammonius (d. circ. 365), in a letter on his visit to SS. Pachomius and Theodore.]

S. Pior was a disciple of the great abbot Anthony. He was once sent by the abbot to his sister, who was very anxious to see him. He went to her house, knocked at her door, and she received him with great joy and affection. But he kept his eyes shut, and said, "Take thy fill of looking at me," and then he hied back to his cell in the desert. This he did that solitaries might learn not to allow themselves to be entangled with the world through visits to or from their relatives.

Once at a conference he came in with a sack of sand on his back, and a little sand in a basket before him. "We are too fond of flinging our own faults behind our backs, that we may fix all our attention on the foibles and failings of others," said he.

== Sozomen's account ==
Henry Ruffner (1790–1861) in his The Fathers of the Desert draws on Sozomen (c. 400–450 AD) and writes,

Pior resolved in early youth to engage in the monastic life. When for this purpose he quitted his father's house, he promised God that he would never afterwards see any of his family. Fifty years afterwards, his sister heard that he was alive. The unexpected news filled her with exceeding joy, and she could not rest until she should see her brother. The bishop of that region, when he saw her lamenting and supplicating on this account in her old age, wrote to the governors of the monks in the desert of Scetis, to send Pior to visit his sister. Being ordered to go, he could not refuse : for the Egyptian monks—and all others, I believe—cannot lawfully disobey a command of their superiors. Therefore he took with him a companion and departed for his own country. When he came to the door of his old family mansion, he stopped and sent in word of his arrival. When he heard the sound of the door opening, he shut his eyes, called his sister by name, and said, I am Pior, your brother : look at me now as much as you please. She was delighted and gave thanks to God. But he, after making a prayer before the door, returned to his place of abode.

He had dug a well here and found only bitter water; but he continued to use it during the remainder of his life. His excessive self-denial in this matter was manifested after his death; for, though many attempted to philosophize at the same place, none of them could bear the water. I am persuaded, however, that he could easily have changed the bitter into sweet water, if he had not chosen to philosophize in this way, seeing that he once made a fountain spout forth where none had existed before : for the monks who were with the monk Moses, relate that they were digging a well once; and having failed to get water at the utmost depth that they could dig, they were giving up in despair, when Pior came upon them and reproved them for their despondency. He then descended into the well; and after he had uttered a prayer, he struck the spade thrice into the ground : whereupon a fountain is said to have gushed up and filled the well. When asked by Moses's monks to stay and dine with them, he said, no, that was not what he had come for : he had finished the business which had brought him thither.

Pior usually walked when he took his food. When asked why he ate in that way, he said, because I am not willing to eat as if I made a business of eating; but I choose to do it as a thing by the way. To another who asked him the same question, he answered, I do it that the mind may not take any pleasure in such a corporeal act as eating.—(Note.— This last paragraph is from Socrates.)

== Palladius' Account ==
Palladius of Galatia (d. 420) writes,

And there was an Egyptian youth whose name was Pîôr, and he was a holy man; and when he departed from the house of his parents he made a covenant with God with the zeal of excellence that he would never see again any of his kinsfolk. And after fifty years had passed, the sister of this blessed man, who was very old and grey, heard that he was alive, and she greatly desired to see him; now she was unable to come to him to the desert, and she besought the Bishop, who was in that country, to write to the fathers who lived in the desert [telling] them to urge him, and to send him to see his sister. Then when the blessed man saw the pressure which came from them to make him go, he took with him certain of the brethren, and set out to go on the journey, and [having arrived] he sent and informed his sister’s household, saying, “Behold, Pîôr thy brother hath come, and he standeth outside.” Now when his sister heard his voice, she went forth in great haste, and when Pîôr heard the sound of the door, and knew that the aged woman his sister was coming forth to see him, he shut his eyes tightly, and said, “So and so, I am thy brother; look at me as far as thou canst do so”; and having seen him she was relieved (or gratified) in her mind, and gave thanks unto God, but she was unable to persuade him to enter into her house. And he made a prayer by the side of the door with his eyes closed tightly, and departed to the desert.

And he also wrought the following wonderful thing: In the place where he lived he dug a hole in the ground, and found water which was bitter [in taste], but until the day wherein he died he endured the bitter taste of the water, in order that he might make known that which he suffered patiently for the sake of God. Now after his death many of the monks wished to abide in that place, but they were not able to do so, even for one year, chiefly because of the terrible nature of the country and the barrenness thereof.

== Sources ==
- Baring-Gould, S. (1897), The Lives Of The Saints: Volume 06, June, London: J. C. Nimmo This article incorporates text from this source, which is in the public domain.
- Butler, Alban (1799), The Lives of the Primitive Fathers, Martyrs, and Other Principal Saints, vol. VI, Edinburgh: J. Moir This article incorporates text from this source, which is in the public domain.
- Ruffner, Henry (1850), The Fathers of the Desert: Or, An Account of the Origin and Practice of Monkery Among Heathen Nations; Its Passage Into the Church; and Some Wonderful Stories of the Fathers Concerning the Primitive Monks and Hermits, vol. 2, Baker and Scribner This article incorporates text from this source, which is in the public domain.
- St. Augustine's Abbey, Ramsgate (1921). The Book of saints : a dictionary of servants of God canonized by the Catholic Church. London: A. & C. Black, ltd. OCLC 671676136. This article incorporates text from this source, which is in the public domain.
