= Carion the Egyptian =

Egyptian Christian monk

- Born: Egypt
- Residence: Scetes
- Died: Egypt

Carion the Egyptian was an Egyptian Christian monk who lived during the 4th century in Scetis, Lower Egypt. He was one of the Desert Fathers.

Carion left his wife and two children to become a monk in Scetis. His son was Zacharias the Recluse (also known as Zacharias of Scetis), who was sent to Scetis to become a monk with his father during a famine.
