= Chaeremon of Nitria =

Egyptian Christian monk

Chaeremon
- Born: c. 282 AD; Egypt
- Residence: Nitrian Desert
- Died: 392 AD (at the age of approx. 110); Egypt
- Venerated in: Roman Catholic Church, Eastern Orthodox Church
- Feast: 16 August

Chaeremon or Cherimon (born c. 282 – died after 392) was an Egyptian Christian monk who lived around the 3rd and 4th centuries AD in the Nitrian Desert of Lower Egypt. He was one of the Desert Fathers.

Chaeremon was an ascetic who lived in a cave. His cell was 40 stadia from the main church in Nitria and 12 stadia away from the main water supply.

He is canonized as a saint in the Eastern Orthodox tradition.
