= Poemen =

5th-century Christian mystic and saint

Saint Poemen the Great
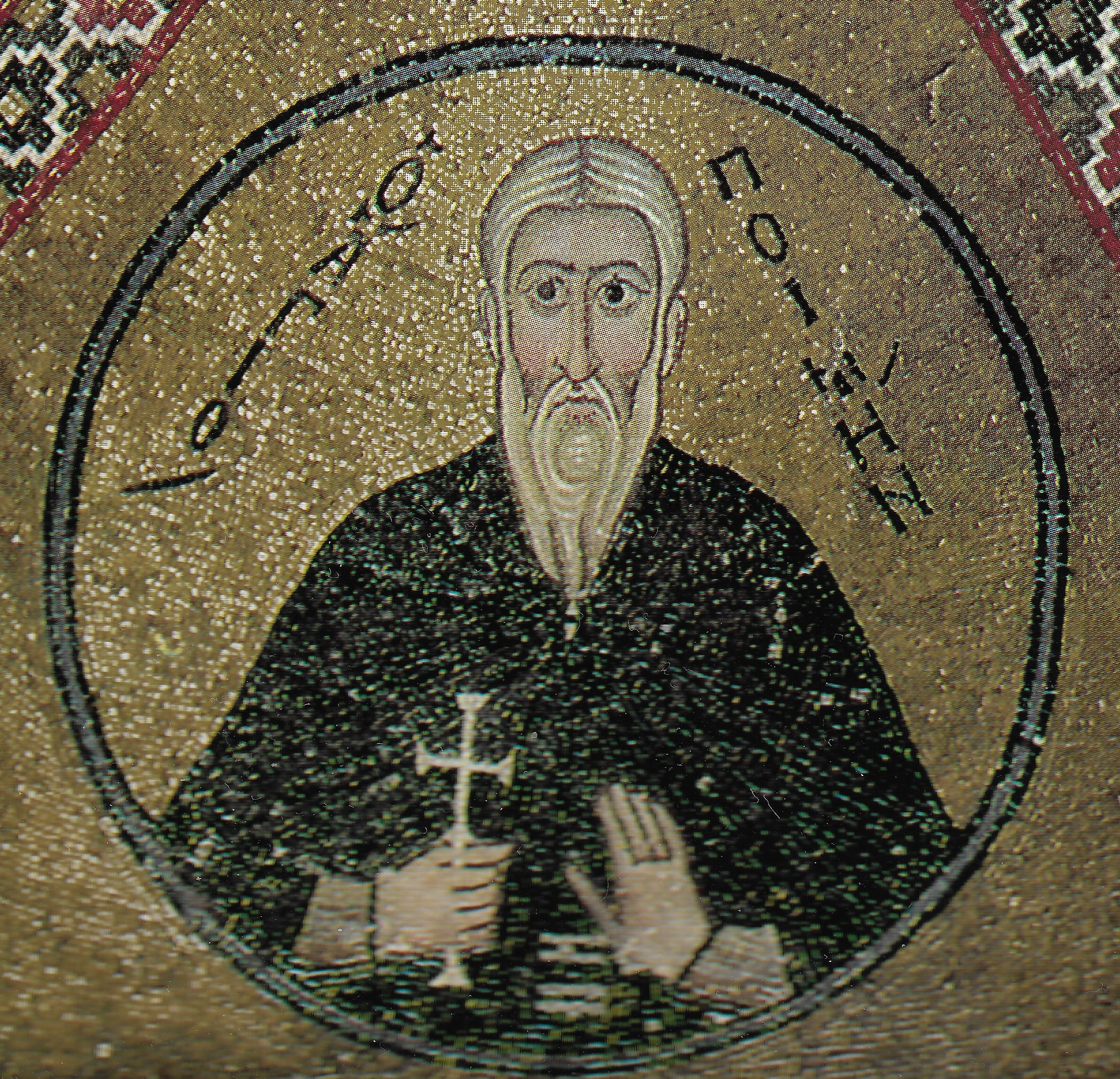
- Mosaic of Saint Poimen from Hosios Loukas, 11th Century

Venerable
- Born: c. 340; Province of Egypt, Roman Empire
- Died: c. 450; Wadi El Natrun, Province of Egypt, Roman Empire
- Venerated in: Eastern Orthodox Church; Oriental Orthodox Churches; Roman Catholic Church
- Feast: 27 August
- Attributes: hermit, ascetic

Poemen the Great (UK: also US: /ˈpiːmən/) (Greek: Ὁ Ἅγιος Ποιμήν; ποιμήν means "shepherd") (c. 340–450) was a Christian monk and early Desert Father who is the most quoted Abba (Father) in the Apophthegmata Patrum (Sayings of the Desert Fathers). Poemen was quoted most often for his gift as a spiritual guide, reflected in the name "Poemen" ("Shepherd"), rather than for his asceticism. He is considered a saint in Eastern Christianity. His feast day is August 27 in the Julian calendar (September 9 in the Gregorian calendar).

== Biography ==
Poemen lived at a monastery in Scetis, one of the first centers of early Christian monasticism. In 407 AD the monastery was overrun by raiders, scattering the monks. Poemen and Anoub, along with a handful of monks, fled to Terenuthis, on the river Nile. After leaving Scetis, Poemen and his group first lived in an abandoned pagan temple. The various raids on Scetis were a turning point in desert monasticism. The ensuing diaspora resulted in Poemen and his group keeping alive the collective wisdom of the monks of Scetis by creating the bulk of the Apophthegmata Patrum (Sayings of the Desert Fathers).

Poemen's personality was described as that of a wise shepherd more than a desert ascetic. He was known for his tolerance of the weakness of others. One apocryphal story recounts that some of the older monks approached Poemen for his advice on how to treat monks who fell asleep during their prayers. They were inclined to wake the sleeping monk, while Poemen took a more compassionate approach, advising, "For my part, when I have seen a brother who is dozing, I put his head on my knees and let him rest." Poemen was typically opposed to giving harsh penances to those who slipped spiritually—when a monk came to him who had committed a "great sin", Poemen reduced his penance from three years to three days.

Another story, though also used in support of Poemen's tendency to "refrain from judgement" tells of a brother monk with a wife (Harmless cites a source claiming her to be a "mistress," but the Systematic Collection uses the Greek word for "woman"/"wife") who had a child —perhaps unclear who the father was. Poemen sent him a bottle of wine as a gift, to celebrate, and the brother was so "conscious stricken...[that he] later dismissed the woman".

Poemen was also described as a charismatic speaker who still taught more by example than by lecturing others. When a visiting monk asked him if he should assume a role of authority over the brothers he was living with, Poemen responded by saying, "No, be their example, not their legislator." Judgment of others was also foreign to his nature. He once stated that, "A man may seem to be silent, but if his heart is condemning others, he is babbling incessantly." Modern writers credit Poemen's gift of memory for keeping alive many of the stories from the Apophthegmata Patrum. Many of those stories are recollections of Poemen from his time with the monks in Scetis. A later Coptic writer, Zacharias of Sakha, believed that Poemen was also a writer, leading to speculation that he might have been one of the authors of the Apophthegmata Patrum.

Some scholars consider the Poemen of the Apophthegmata Patrum to be merely a generic desert Abba, while others credit Poemen and his group with collecting the many sayings that became the Apophthegmata Patrum. Wilhelm Bousset and William Harmless both treat Poemen as a historical figure.

== Selected sayings of Poemen ==
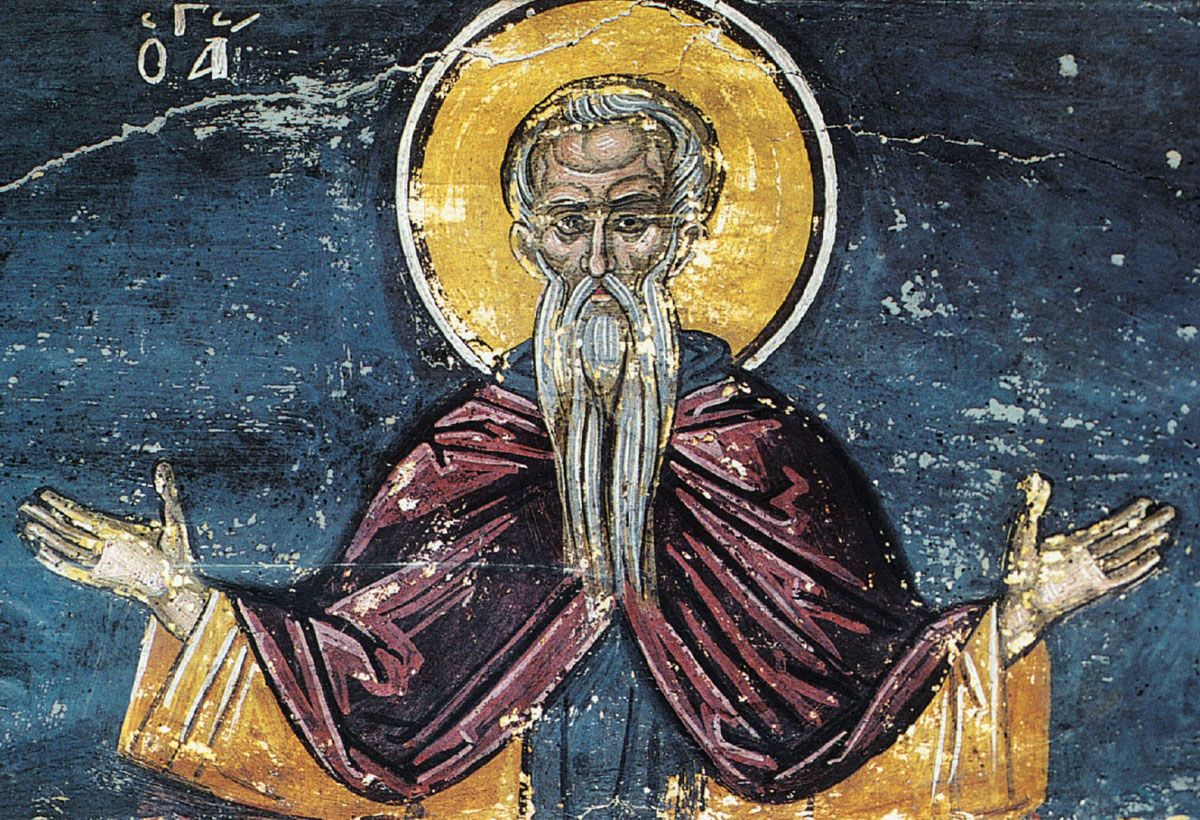
Fresco of Saint Poimen, Dionysiou Monastery, Mount Athos, 1547

Poemen is the most often quoted Abba in the Apophthegmata Patrum—nearly a quarter of the sayings are by or about Poemen—which led some scholars to think that sayings from different Abbas were collected under the generic name "Abba Shepherd." Abba Poemen is also featured prominently in another collection of Desert Father sayings, the Ethiopic Collectio Monastica. He was notable for his kindness and compassion toward his fellow monks, including those who had fallen from the high ideals of the Desert Fathers. He was frequently sought out by his brothers for his wise and compassionate guidance.

- "Many of our Fathers have become very courageous in asceticism, but in fineness of perception there are very few."
- In response to a brother monk who chided Poemen for washing his feet, he said, "We have not been taught to kill our bodies, but to kill our passions."
- Many of Poemen's sayings included sets of three, such as a list of three "instruments for the work of the soul": "to throw yourself before God, not to measure your progress, to leave behind all self-will."
