= John Chryssavgis =

American Orthodox Christian theologian (born 1958)

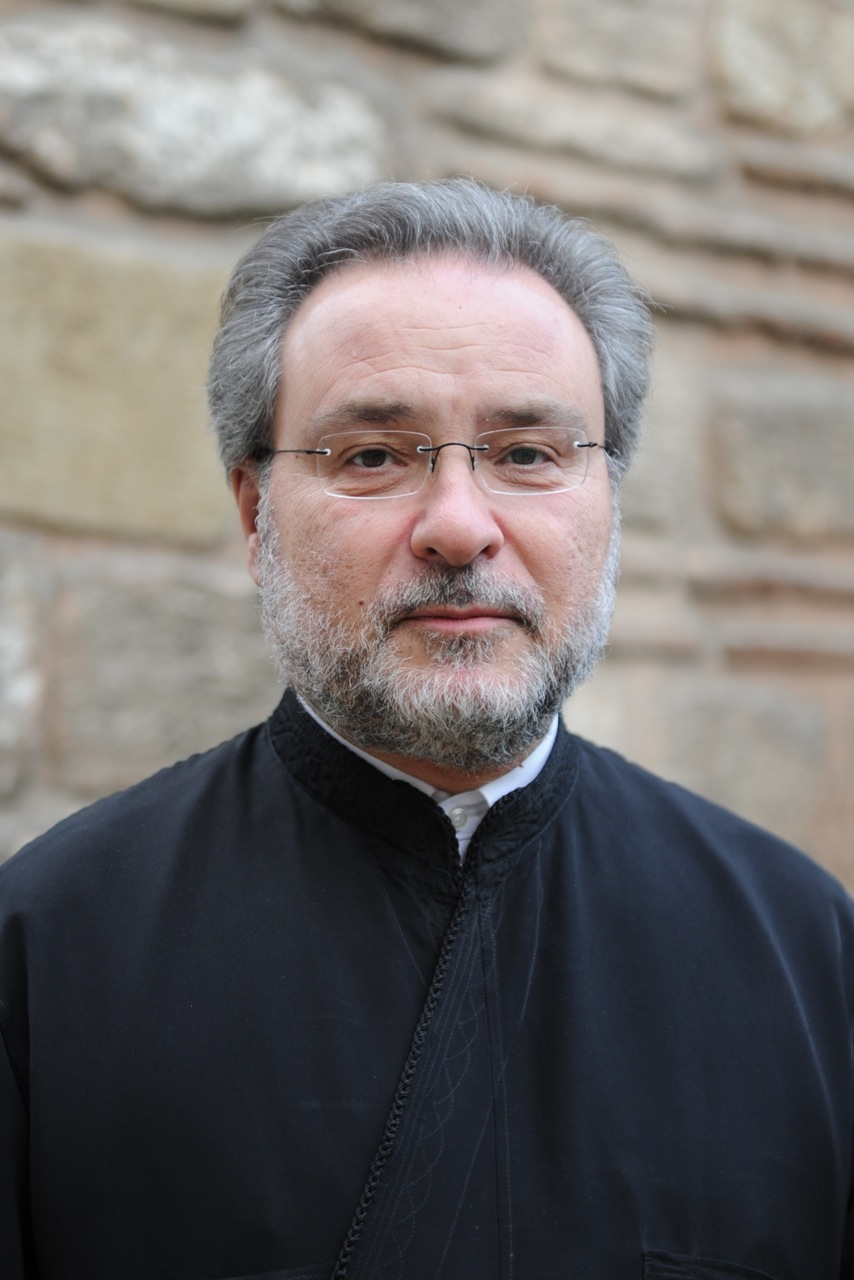
John Chryssavgis in 2014

John Chryssavgis (born 1 April 1958) is an Orthodox Christian theologian who serves as advisor to the Ecumenical Patriarch on environmental issues. He is a clergyman of the Greek Orthodox Archdiocese of America. In January 2012, he received the title of Archdeacon of the Ecumenical Throne by His All-Holiness Ecumenical Patriarch Bartholomew. In 2016, he was awarded an honorary doctorate by Saint Vladimir's Orthodox Theological Seminary. In 2020, he was elected Honorary Professor of Theology in the Sydney College of Divinity.

== Early life and education ==
John Chryssavgis was born in Australia in 1958. He matriculated from the Scots College in Sydney in 1975 and received his degree in theology from the University of Athens in 1980. He received a diploma in Byzantine Music from the Greek Conservatory of Music in 1979 and was awarded a research scholarship to St. Vladimir's Theological Seminary in 1982. He completed his doctoral studies in Patristics at the University of Oxford in 1983. Chryssavgis read patristic theology at Oxford.

== Career ==
His work and writing have focused on medieval theology, as well as on the history of the Eastern Church. He holds degrees in theology and sacred music. His teaching has covered wide-ranging topics, such as theological, political, and social developments, themes and personalities of the Middle Ages, including cultural and religious relations and tensions between East and West. His interests have embraced the areas of spirituality, ecology, and liturgy. His research is in the ascetic thought and practice of the early Church, especially from the desert tradition of Egypt (4th century) through the regions of Palestine (5th–6th centuries) and Sinai (7th century). After several months in silent retreat on Mount Athos, he worked with the Greek Orthodox Primate in Australia (1984–1994) and was co-founder of St Andrew's Theological College in Sydney, where he was Sub-Dean and taught Patristics and Church History (1986–1995). He was also Lecturer in the Divinity School (1986–1990) and the School of Studies in Religion (1990–1995) at the University of Sydney.

In 1995, he moved to Boston, where he was appointed Professor of Theology at Holy Cross School of Theology and directed the Religious Studies Program at Hellenic College until 2002. He established the Environment Office at the same school in 2001. He has also taught as professor of Patristics at the University of Balamand in Lebanon. Chryssavgis is a frequent contributor to the journal Public Orthodoxy published by the Orthodox Christian Studies Center of Fordham University.

Chryssavgis was appointed a Member of the Order of Australia in the 2026 King's Birthday Honours in recognition of his "significant service to the Orthodox Christian Church, to education, and to advancing ecological awareness".

He lives in Maine.

== Bibliography ==
- Persons and Events: Historical Moments in the Development of Orthodox Christianity, Archdiocese of Australia, Sydney, 1985.
- Fire and Light: Aspects of the Eastern Orthodox Tradition (Light and Life Publications, Minneapolis MN, 1987).
- Ascent to Heaven: The Theology of the Human Person According to Saint John of the Ladder (Holy Cross Press, Boston MA, 1989).
- The World My Church (with Sophie Chryssavgis), David Lovell Publishing, Melbourne, 1990. Reprinted with changes by Holy Cross Press, Boston MA, 1998. ISBN 9780917651809
- The Desert is Alive: Dimensions of Australian Spirituality, Joint Board of Christian Education, Melbourne, 1990. Second Printing 1993.
- Repentance and Confession, Holy Cross Press, Boston MA, 1990. Second Printing 1996. Third printing 1998. ISBN 9780917651564
- Love, Sexuality, and Marriage, Holy Cross Press, Boston MA, 1996. Second printing 1998.
- The Way of the Fathers: Exploring the Mind of the Church Fathers, Analecta Vlatadon, Thessalonika, 1998.
- Beyond the Shattered Image: Insights into an Orthodox Ecological World View, Light and Life Books, Minneapolis MN, 1999. ISBN 9781880971420
- Soul Mending: The Art of Spiritual Direction, Holy Cross Press, Boston MA, 2000. ISBN 9781885652478
- In the Footsteps of Christ: the ascetic teaching of Abba Isaiah of Scetis, SLG Press, Oxford UK, 2001. [With P.R.Penkett]
- The Body of Christ: A Place of Welcome for People with Disabilities, Light and Life, Minneapolis MN, 2002. Subsequently published by the Greek Orthodox Archdiocese of America: New York NY, 2017.
- Abba Isaiah of Scetis: The Ascetic Discourses, Cistercian Publications, Kalamazoo MI, 2002. [With P.R.Penkett] ISBN 9780879077501
- In the Heart of the Desert: The Spirituality of the Desert Fathers and Mothers, World Wisdom Books, Bloomington IN, 2003. 2nd revised edition 2008. Also translated into Italian: Bose Publications, Italy 2004. Also translated into Romanian: Sophia Editions, Bucharest, 2004.
- Cosmic Grace, Humble Prayer: Ecological Vision of Ecumenical Patriarch Bartholomew, Eerdmans Books, Grand Rapids MI, 2003. Revised and updated, 2009. ISBN 9780802821690
- Letters from the Desert: A Selection of the Spiritual Correspondence of Barsanuphius and John, St. Vladimir's Seminary Press, New York NY, 2003.
- The Way of Tears: A Spirituality of Imperfection, In Greek: Akritas Publications, Athens, 2003.
- The Way of the Fathers: Exploring the Mind of the Church Fathers, Light and Life Books, Minneapolis MN, 2003
- Light through Darkness: Insights into Orthodox Spirituality, Orbis Press: Maryknoll; and Darton Longman and Todd: London, 2004 ISBN 9781570755484
- John Climacus: From the Egyptian Desert to the Sinaite Mountain, Ashgate, London, 2004. ISBN 9781138580817
- The Reflections of Abba Zosimas: Monk of the Palestinian Desert, SLG Press: Oxford, 2004. Reprinted 2006.
- The Ecumenical Patriarchate: a historical guide, Ecumenical Patriarchate Publications, Constantinople, 2005. 2nd revised edition, 2007.
- The Correspondence of Barsanuphius and John, with translation, introduction, notes and complete indices (scriptural, patristic, subject and names). For Catholic University Press, Washington DC, 2 volumes, 2006 and 2007.
- In the World, Yet Not of the World: Social and Global Initiatives of Ecumenical Patriarch Bartholomew, Fordham University Press, New York, 2009. ISBN 9780823231713
- Speaking the Truth in Love: Theological and Spiritual Exhortations of Ecumenical Patriarch Bartholomew, Fordham University Press, New York, 2010. ISBN 9780823233373
- In the Footsteps of St. Paul: An Academic Symposium, Holy Cross Press, Boston MA, 2011. [With Archbishop Demetrios Trakatellis of America]
- On Earth as in Heaven: Ecological Vision and Initiatives of Ecumenical Patriarch Bartholomew, Fordham University Press, New York, 2012. ISBN 9780823238859
- Remembering and Reclaiming Diakonia: The Diaconate Yesterday and Today (Brookline, MA: Holy Cross Orthodox Press, 2009) ISBN 9781935317036
- The Patriarch of Solidarity: Ecological and Global Concerns of Ecumenical Patriarch Bartholomew, In Greek and English: Istos Books, Istanbul, 2013.
- Toward an Ecology of Transfiguration: Orthodox Christian Perspectives on Environment, Nature, and Creation, Fordham University Press, New York, 2013. [With Bruce Foltz]
- Dialogue of Love: Breaking the Silence of Centuries, Fordham University Press, 2014. ISBN 9780823264001
- The Ecumenical Patriarchate Today: Sacred Greek Orthodox Sites of Istanbul, London Editions: Istanbul, 2014.
- Translation of The Fathers of the Church: Barsanuphius and John, Letters, Volume 2, The Catholic University of America Press, Washington, D.C., 2014.
- Three Perspectives on the Sacred: The Augustana Distinguished Lectures, Chester Ronning Center, Camrose Alberta, 2015.
- Saint Anthony the Great, with Marilyn Rouvelas [Illustrated by Isabelle Brent], Wisdom Tales, Bloomington IN, 2015.
- Primacy in the Church: The Office of Primacy and the Authority of Councils, St. Vladimir's Press, Yonkers NY, 2016 [2 volumes].
- Toward the Holy and Great Council: Retrieving a Culture of Conciliarity and Communion, Faith Matters Series, no. 1: Greek Orthodox Archdiocese of America, New York NY, 2016.
- (translation) Anastasios Yannoulatos, In Africa: Orthodox Witness and Service, Holy Cross Orthodox Press, Brookline MA, 2015.
- Translation of The Fathers of the Church: Barsanuphius and John, Letters, Volume 1, The Catholic University of America Press, Washington, D.C., 2015.
- Bartholomew: Apostle and Visionary, HarperCollins, New York NY, 2016. ISBN 9780718086893
  - Greek translation: Athens Books, Athens, 2017.
  - French Bartholomée apôtre et visionnaire Cerf, Paris, 2017. ISBN 9782204114899
  - Ukrainian and Russian translation: Ethos Biblioteka, Kyiv, 2021
- (translation) Anastasios Yannoulatos, In Albania: Cross and Resurrection, St. Vladimir's Seminary Press, Yonkers NY, 2016. ISBN 9780881415308
- Theology as Doxology and Dialogue: The Essential Writings of Nikos Nissiotis, with Nikolaos Asproulis (eds), Fortress Academic, Lanham MD, 2019. ISBN 9781978703421
- Creation as Sacrament: Reflections on Ecology and Spirituality, Bloomsbury/T&T Clark, London, 2019. ISBN 9780567680709
- Coedited (with Nikolaos Asproulis), Priests of Creation: John Zizioulas on Discerning an Ecological Crisis, T&T Clark, London, 2021. ISBN 9780567699091
- (with Brandon Gallaher), The Living Christ: The Theological Legacy of Georges Florovsky, T&T Clark, London, 2021. ISBN 9780567701855
- (with Peter Chamberas), The Recognition of Saints in the Orthodox Church Past and Present, Newfound Publishing, Hebron NH, 2021.
- Coedited two volumes on The Holy and Great Council of the Orthodox Church: Orthodox Theology in the Twenty-First Century, University of Thessaloniki, Thessaloniki, 2021 [Greek and English].
- The Letters of Barsanuphius and John: Desert Wisdom for Everyday Life, Foreword by Kallistos Ware, 2021, T&T Clark, London, 2022. ISBN 9780567704856
- (translation), Archbishop Anastasios Yannoulatos of Albania, Coexistence: Peace, Nature, Poverty, Terrorism, and Values Geneva: World Council of Churches, Geneva, 2022. ISBN 9782825417522
- Theology, Ecology, and Ecumenism: Reflections of an Innocent Sojourner (Fairfax, VA: Washington Theological Consortium, 2023). Introduction by Paul McPartlan. ISBN 9781940219691
