= Plutarch and companions =

Christian martyrs

Saints Plutarch and companions
- Died: c. 202; Alexandria, Egypt
- Canonized: Pre-congregation
- Feast: 28 June

Saints Plutarch, Serenus, Heraclides, Heron, Serenus, Rhais, Potamiœna and Marcella (died between 202–205 AD) were Christian martyrs in Egypt under the persecution of the Roman emperor Septimius Severus. Their feast day is 28 June.

== Roman Martyrology ==
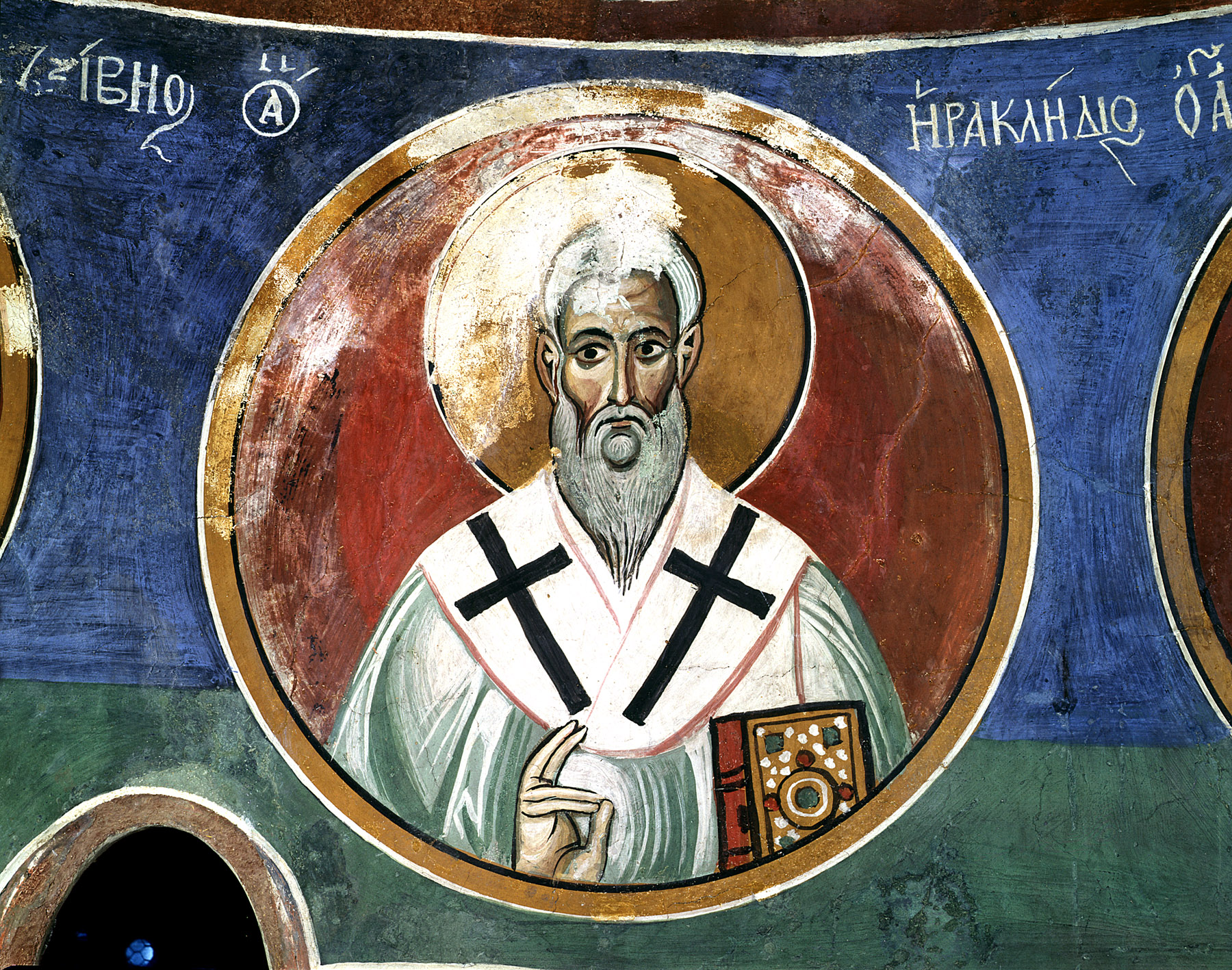
St. Heracleides

The Roman Martyrology as of 1916 for the twenty-eighth day of June says,

At Alexandria, in the same persecution of Severus, the holy martyrs Plutarch, Serenus, Heraclides, catechumen, Heron, neophyte, another Serenus, Rhais, catechumen, Potamiœna and Marcella, her mother. Among them, the virgin Potamiœna is particularly distinguished. She first endured many most painful trials for the preservation of her virginity, and then cruel and unheard-of torments for the faith, after which she and her mother were consumed with fire.

== Monks of Ramsgate account ==
The monks of St Augustine's Abbey, Ramsgate wrote in their Book of Saints (1921),

Plutarchus, Serenus, Heraclides, Heron, Serenus, Rhais, Potamiœna and Marcella (SS.) MM. (June 28) (3rd cent.) Martyrs of Alexandria in Egypt In the persecution under Septimius Severus (A.D. 202). Eusebius describes them as being disciples of Origen, then at the beginning of his career. They were variously tortured before execution, and most of them burned alive. Among those who thus perished the best known Is St. Potamiœna, a maiden who was tied to the same stake and died in the same fire with her mother St. Marcella.

== Butler's account ==
The hagiographer Alban Butler (1710–1773) wrote in his Lives of the Fathers, Martyrs, and Other Principal Saints under June 28,

St. Plutarch, &c. MM. The school of Origen at Alexandria was a school of virtue and martyrdom; for the master, notwithstanding his extraordinary reputation in the sciences, made it the first part of his care to train up all his scholars in the most heroic maxims of Christian perfection. Hence it is not to be wondered that out of it came many illustrious martyrs in the persecution of Severus, which raged with great fury from 202, the year before Origen was made catechist, to the death of that emperor in 211.

The first of these heroes of virtue was St. Plutarch, brother of St. Heraclas, afterwards bishop of Alexandria. These two eminent brothers were converted to the faith at the same time by hearing certain lectures read by Origen. Plutarch prepared himself for martyrdom by a holy life, and being a person of distinction was soon apprehended. Origen visited and encouraged him in prison, and accompanied him to the place of execution, where he narrowly escaped death himself, from the resentment of Plutarch’s Pagan friends, who looked upon him as the cause of their losing him. Serenus, another scholar of Origen, was burnt alive for the faith; Heraclides, a third, yet a catechumen, and Hero, who had been lately baptized, were beheaded: another Serenus, after undergoing many torments, had his head also cut off. Herais, a damsel, being but a catechumen, was burnt, and according to the expression of Origen, baptized by fire; for Origen had among his disciples several illustrious ladies. See Eusebius, l. 6, c. 3, 4.

SS. Potamiana or Potamiena, and Basilides, MM. These two also owed their instruction in virtue to the same master with the former, as Henry Valesius proves from Eusebius’s history, and as Rufinus assures us. Potamiana was by condition a slave, but had the happiness to be educated in the faith by a pious mother, whose name was Marcella, and seeking the ablest master of piety, applied herself to Origen. She was young, and of amazing beauty, and her heathen master conceived a brutish desire to abuse her; but finding her resolution and virtue invincible, and all his artifices, threats, and promises in vain, he delivered her to the prefect Aquila, entreating him not to hurt her if she could be prevailed upon to consent to his passion, and on that condition promising him a considerable sum of money. The prefect not being able to persuade her, made her undergo several torments, and at length caused a caldron of boiling pitch to be prepared, and then said to her: “Go, obey your master, or you shall be thrown into this caldron.” She answered, “I conjure you by the life of the emperor whom you respect, that you do not let me appear uncovered; command me rather to be let down by degrees into the caldron with my clothes on, that you may see the patience with which Jesus Christ, of whom you are ignorant, endues those who trust in him.”

The prefect granted this request, and delivered her to Basilides, one of her guards, to carry her to execution. Basilides treated her with mildness and civility, and kept off the people, who pressed on to insult her modesty, with lewd and opprobrious speeches, all the way she went. The martyr, by way of requital, bade him be of good courage; and promised, that “after her death she would obtain of God his salvation,” as Eusebius expresses it. When she had spoken thus, the executioners put her feet into the boiling pitch, and dipped her in by degrees to the very top of her head; and thus she finished her martyrdom. Her mother, Marcella, was burnt at the same time.

Tertullian and Origen testify that many were then called to the faith by visions and apparitions. By such a favour was the conversion of the soldier Basilides wrought through the prayers of St. Potamiana, who whilst alive had promised he should feel the effects of her gratitude when she should be gone to Christ. A little after her martyrdom, the soldiers who were his comrades, being about to make him swear by their false gods, he declared that he was a Christian, and could by no means do it. They at first thought he jested; but finding him to persist in his resolution, they carried him to the prefect, who caused him to be put in prison. The Christians who came to visit him there, asked him the cause of his sudden change. He answered them, that Potamiana had appeared to him on the night after the third day from her martyrdom, and had placed a crown on his head, saying, that she had besought the Lord to give him the grace of salvation, and had obtained her request; and that he should shortly be called by Him to glory. After this, having received from the brethren the seal of the Lord (that is, baptism), he made the next day, a second time, a glorious confession of the faith before the tribunal of the prefect, and sentence of death being passed upon him, his head was cut off with an axe. St. Potamiana appeared to several others in dreams, and they were converted to the faith. See Eusebius, Hist. l. 6. c. 5. and Palladius, Lausiac, c. 3.

== Sources ==
- Butler, Alban (1799), The Lives of the Primitive Fathers, Martyrs, and Other Principal Saints, Edinburgh: J. Moir This article incorporates text from this source, which is in the public domain.
- Gibbons, James, ed. (1916), The Roman martyrology, Baltimore: John Murphy This article incorporates text from this source, which is in the public domain.
- St. Augustine's Abbey, Ramsgate (1921), The Book of saints : a dictionary of servants of God canonized by the Catholic Church, London: A. & C. Black, ltd. This article incorporates text from this source, which is in the public domain.
