= Paul the Simple =

Egyptian saint

Saint Paul the Simple
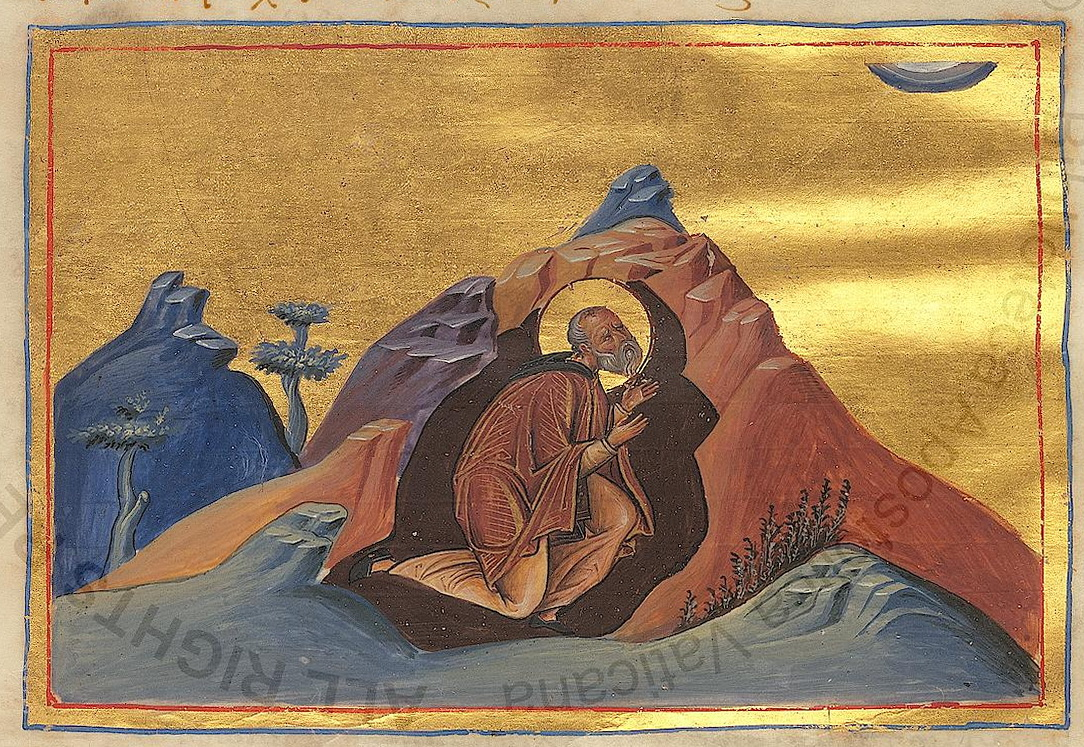
- Miniature from the Menologion of Basil II

Hermit
- Born: 225 AD; Egypt
- Died: 339 AD; Egypt
- Venerated in: Catholic Church; Eastern Orthodox Churches; Oriental Orthodox Churches; Anglican Communion
- Feast: March 7 (Roman Catholic Church); March 7 (Orthodox Church)

Paul the Simple of Egypt (225 – 339) was a hermit and disciple of Anthony the Great. John, the Abbot of Sinai wrote "Paul the Simple was a clear example for us, for he was the rule and type of blessed simplicity." Though contemporaries, he is not to be confused with Paul of Thebes, regarded as the First Hermit. The account of his life is found in Palladius of Helenopolis De Vitis Patrum 8,28 and Tyrannius Rufinus Historia Eremitica 31.

== Life ==
Paul was a farmer who, at the age of sixty, discovered that his beautiful wife was having an affair and so left her to become a hermit. Approaching Anthony, Paul indicated his desire to become a monk. Anthony responded by saying it would be quite impossible for a man of sixty years to adopt such a radical life style. He instead encouraged Paul to be content with the life of being a thankful and pious labourer. Paul was unsatisfied with this answer and responded by pleading his will to learn. Anthony said that if he wished to be a monk he should go to a cenobium. With this Anthony shut the door, and Paul remained outside. On the fourth day Anthony, fearing lest he should die, took him in. He set him to work weaving a rope out of palm leaves, made him undo what he had done, and do it again.

That night at dinner, Anthony took a crust of bread and gave three to Paul. When each had eaten one crust, Anthony told Paul to eat another. "If you have another one, I will," said Paul, "but not if you won't." "I've had quite sufficient for one who is a monk," said Anthony. Paul replied, "Then one is enough for me, for I want to be a monk."

Anthony continued to test Paul's endurance and humility through hard work, severe fasting, with nightly vigils, constant singing of Psalms and prostrations. Anthony, who was impressed by Paul's dedication, permitted Paul a separate cell some miles from his own.

Eventually, it is said, Paul the Simple was able to cast out demons. Anthony, it is recorded, had passed a possessed youth saying, "I cannot help the boy, for I have not received power over the Prince of the demons. Paul the Simple, however, does have this gift."

== See also ==
- Desert Fathers
- Christian monasticism
- Saint Paul the Simple, patron saint archive
