= Orsisius =

Egyptian monk and author

Orsisius (in Greek Arsisios, local name Oresiesis-Heru-sa Ast) was an Egyptian monk and author in the fourth century. His memorial is June 15.

== Biography ==
Orsisius was a disciple of Pachomius on the Island Tabenna in the Nile. When Pacomius died (348), Orsisius was chosen as his successor; but he resigned in favour of Theodore. It was not till Theodore's death (c. 380) that Orsisius, advised by St. Athanasius, accepted the abbatial office of hegumen.

== Writings ==
Theodore and Orsisius are said to have helped Pachomius in the composition of his rule; Gennadius mentions another work:

"Oresiesis the monk, a colleague of Pachomius and Theodore, perfectly learned in the Scriptures, composed a Divinely savoured book containing instruction for all monastic discipline, in which nearly the whole Old and New Testaments are explained in short dissertations in as far as they affect monks; and shortly before his death he gave this book to his brethren as his testament."

This is supposed to be the work "Doctrina de institutione monachorum" translated by St. Jerome into Latin. Migne prints after it another work attributed to the same author: "De sex cogitationibus sanctorum libellus", which, however, is probably by a later Oresius.

== Sources ==
- Herbermann, Charles, ed. (1913). "Orsisius". Catholic Encyclopedia. New York: Robert Appleton Company.
