= Elias the Hermit =

Saint Elias the Hermit
- Born: c. 261 AD; Roman Egypt
- Died: c. 371 AD (aged 110); Antinoöpolis, Roman Egypt
- Honored in: Eastern Orthodox Church Byzantine Catholic Church
- Feast: 8 January

Venerable Elias the Hermit (also known as Elias of Egypt, died 371 AD) was a desert dwelling monk of the fourth century AD. He led the ascetic life for seventy-five years in a mountain cave of Egypt. He is recorded to have lived 110 years.

Venerable Elias the Hermit, of Egypt is commemorated 8 January by the Orthodox and Byzantine Catholic Churches.

== See also ==
- Desert Fathers
- Stylites
