= John of Egypt =

Egyptian hermit

Saint John of Lycopolis
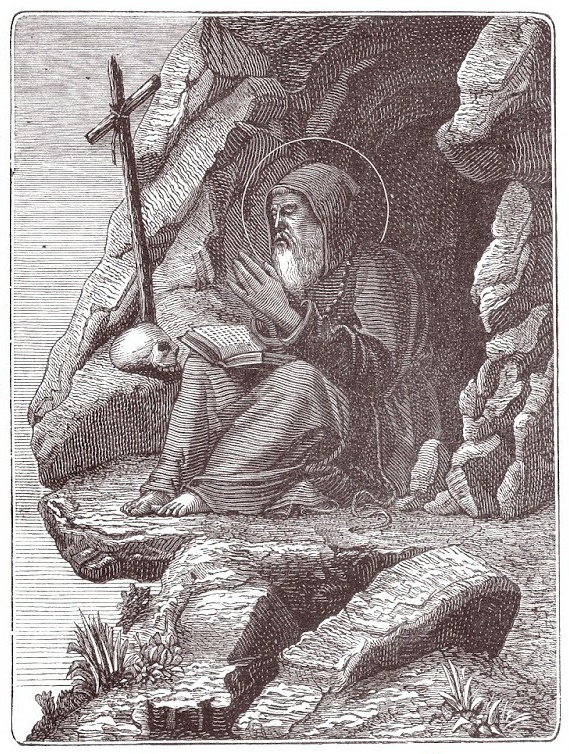

Anchorite, Hermit
- Born: c. 305 AD; Thebaid, Egypt
- Died: c. 394 AD (aged 89); Lycopolis, Thebaid, Egypt
- Venerated in: Catholic Church, Coptic Orthodox Church
- Feast: 17 October (Coptic Orthodox Church), 27 March (Roman Catholic Church, Orthodox Church)

Saint John of Egypt, (c. 305 – 394), also known as John the Hermit, John the Anchorite, or John of Lycopolis, was one of the hermits and grazers of the Nitrian Desert. He began as a carpenter but at the age of twenty-five began to live a life of solitude.

== Early life ==
John of Egypt was born in Lycopolis. His parents were poor and he trained as a carpenter. At the age of 25, he became a monk under the guidance of an elderly hermit.

He spent a decade with the hermit, taking direction from him and learning from him. John Cassian recounts a tale that the hermit directed John to water a dry stick every day for a year. After this test of obedience his superior threw the stick away. When the hermit died, John spent the next five years travelling and visiting monasteries.

== Life as a hermit ==
According to hagiographer Alban Butler, John was noted for performing seemingly absurd acts such as rolling rocks from place to place and cultivating dead trees. Finally, he withdrew to the top of a cliff near Lycopolis, Egypt, where he could avoid all human contact. There he carved three small cells out of rock; one for sleeping, one for work and the last for praying. Then he walled them up with himself inside, leaving only a small window. He communicated through the window to people who brought him food and water twice a week. Crowds would gather on those two days to hear him preach.

John never ate until sunset and lived on a diet of dried fruit and vegetables for fifty years. He refused bread and never ate anything cooked. He lived this way well into his nineties.

He was believed to possess the spiritual gift of prophecy and often predicting the future and knowing the details of persons he had never met. He predicted future victories to the Emperor Theodosius the Great.

He avoided seeing women, in particular, to avoid temptation, but he avoided all people for the last fifty years of his life. Saint Augustine wrote that John was tempted by devils and performed miraculous cures. He cured a woman, according to Augustine, of blindness and then appeared to her in a vision to avoid seeing her in person.

According to Butler, John prayed incessantly, and he spent the last three days of his life without food or drink or any interactions but prayer. He was discovered in his cell, with his body in a position of prayer.

His feast day is March 27 in the Western churches and June 12 in Eastern Orthodoxy.
