= January 5 (Eastern Orthodox liturgics) =

Day in the Eastern Orthodox liturgical calendar

Eastern Orthodox liturgical calendar
January 4	January 5	January 6
January 5 O.S. ≍ January 18 N.S. January 5 N.S ≍ December 23 O.S.

An Eastern Orthodox cross

January 5 in Eastern Orthodox liturgical calendars is a feast day and a day of commemoration of saints and martyrs. Although some Orthodox churches use the Revised Julian Calendar and others use the traditional Julian calendar, the fixed commemorations for their respective January 5 are broadly the same, no matter which calendar is used. (Note: Despite the dates being the same, the days to which they refer typically differ by 13 days. The notation Old Style or O.S. is sometimes used to indicate a date in the traditional Julian Calendar (the "Old Calendar"). The notation New Style or N.S, indicates a date in the Revised Julian calendar (the "New Calendar").)

== Feasts ==
- Eve of the Theophany of Our Lord and Saviour Jesus Christ.

== Saints ==
- Prophet Micah (9th century BC) (see also: August 14)
- Hieromartyr Theopemptus, Bishop of Nicomedia, and Martyr Theonas, former sorcerer (303)
- Martyr Sais.
- Martyr Theoeidos.
- Venerable Syncletica (Synkletika, Syncletike), Nun of Alexandria (c. 350 or c. 460)
- Righteous Domnina (Domna).
- Righteous Tatiana, Nun.
- Saint Talida, Abbess at Antinoë, and her disciple Taora (5th century)
- Saint Apollinaria, Virgin of Egypt (c. 470) (see also: January 4)
- Venerable Phosterius the Hermit (6th-7th century)
- Venerable Menas of Sinai (6th century)
- Venerable Gregory of Crete, Monk (c. 820)
- Venerable Dorotheos the Younger, restorer of the ancient Monastery of the Holy Trinity at Chiliokomon in Amaseia, Pontus. (Note: "A homily, which is written in the form of a Vita by John Mauropous, metropolitan of Euchaita, on St. Dorotheos the Younger, gives the information that the monastery of Chryse Petra was not very far from Chiliokomon (the plain with a thousand towns, today Sulu-ova = the plain of the waters) where St. Dorotheos had restored the ancient monastery of Holy Trinity and had received the typikon of the monastery of Chryse Petra: ...καί της χρυσής καλούμενης πέτρας (ούδ' εκείνη δε πόρρω). This short reference reveals that the monastery of Chryse Petra was near Chiliokomon, and in a wider sense, near the Iris river.")

== Pre-Schism Western saints ==
- Hieromartyr Telesphorus, a Greek who was Pope of Rome for ten years (c. 136) (Note: "At Rome, in the time of Antoninus Pius, St. Telesphorus, pope, who, after many sufferings for the confession of Christ, underwent a glorious martyrdom.") (see also February 22, Eastern Orthodox)
- Saint Emiliana, a Roman lady and the paternal aunt of Saint Gregory the Great (6th century) (Note: "At Rome, the holy virgin Emiliana, aunt of pope St. Gregory. Being called to God by her sister Tharsilla, who had preceded her, she departed for heaven on this day.")
- Saint Kiara (Chier), a spiritual daughter of Saint Fintan Munnu; she lived in Ireland near Nenagh in Co. Tipperary, at a place now called Kilkeary after her (c. 680)
- Venerable Cera of Ireland (Ciar, Cyra, Cior, Ceara), Abbess (7th century) (Note: "Born in Tipperary in Ireland, she was abbess of two convents, one at Kilkeary and the other at Tech Telle, now Tehelly.")
- Venerable Conwoïon (Convoyon), a Breton saint and Abbot (868) (Note: "Born in Brittany, he became a monk and founded the Monastery of St Saviour near Redon (Redon Abbey). He was driven out of his monastery by the Vikings and reposed in exile.")
- Saint Gaudentius of Gnesen (Radim Gaudentius), first Archbishop of Gnesen in Poland (1004) (Note: "Younger brother of St. Adalbert of Prague and also a monk at the monastery of Sant' Alessio on the Aventine in Rome. He escaped the massacre in which his brother was martyred by the pagan Prussians and in 1000 became first Archbishop of Gnesen in Poland.")

== Post-Schism Orthodox saints ==
- Venerable Symeon of the Pskov-Caves Monastery, Hieroschemamonk (1960)
- Venerable Theophan (Medvedev), Schema-Archimandrite of the Rykhlovsk Monastery (ru), in the Nizhyn diocese, Ukraine (1977) (see also: August 11 - Uncovering of Relics)

=== New martyrs and confessors ===
- New Venerable Martyr Romanus of Karpenisi (Carpenision) and Kapsokalyvia, at Constantinople (1694) (see also February 16)
- New Hieromartyr Andrei (Andrew) Zimin, Archpriest, his wife Lydia, his mother-in-law Domnica, his two or three daughters, and his servant Maria, of Ussurisk, Siberia (1920) (Note: See: (in Russian) Андрей (Зимин). Википедии. (Russian Wikipedia).)
- New Hieromartyr Joseph Bespalov, and with him 37 Martyrs (1921)
- New Hieromartyr Stephen Ponomarev, Protopresbyter, at Alma-Ata (1933)
- New Virgin Martyr Eugenia Domozhirova, at Alma-Ata (1933)
- New Hieromartyr Sergius Lavrov, Priest (1934)
- New Martyr Matthew Gusev (1938)

== Other commemorations ==
- Translation of the relics (981) of Saint Rumon of Tavistock, Bishop (6th century), to Tavistock Abbey.
- Repose of Monk Alexander of Valaam Monastery (1810)

== Icon gallery ==
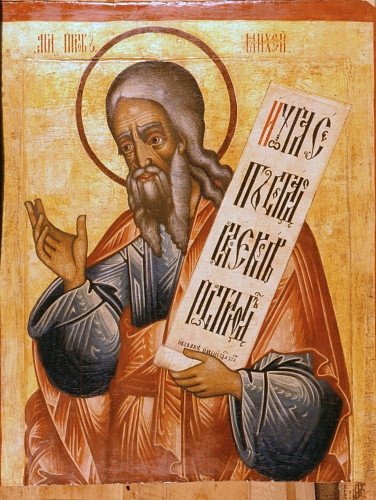
Prophet Micah (18th-century icon).

Prophet Micah.
(Menologion of Basil II, 10th century).

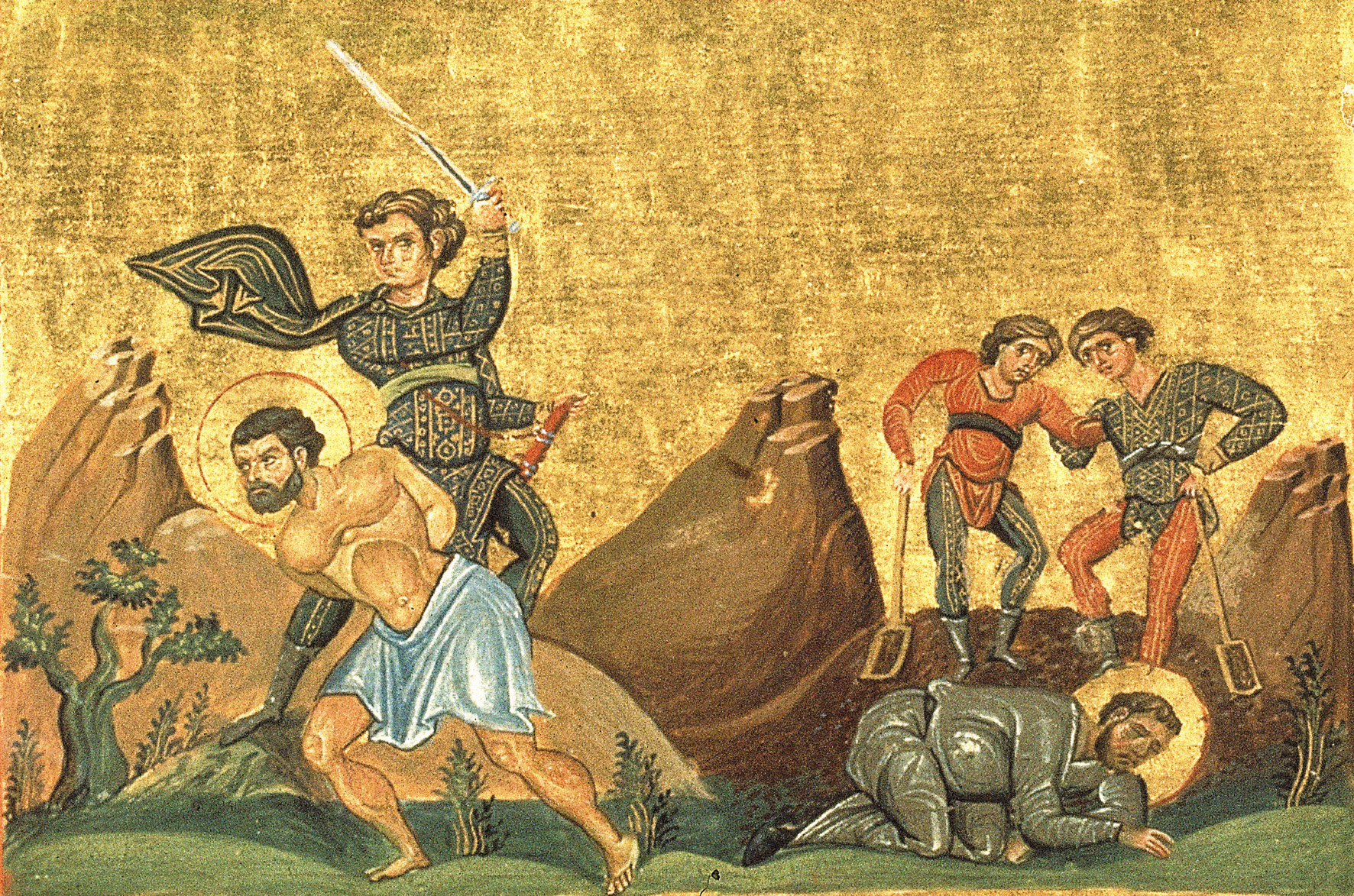
Martyrdom of Theopemptus, Bishop of Nicomedia and Theonas, former sorcerer.
(Menologion of Basil II, 10th century).

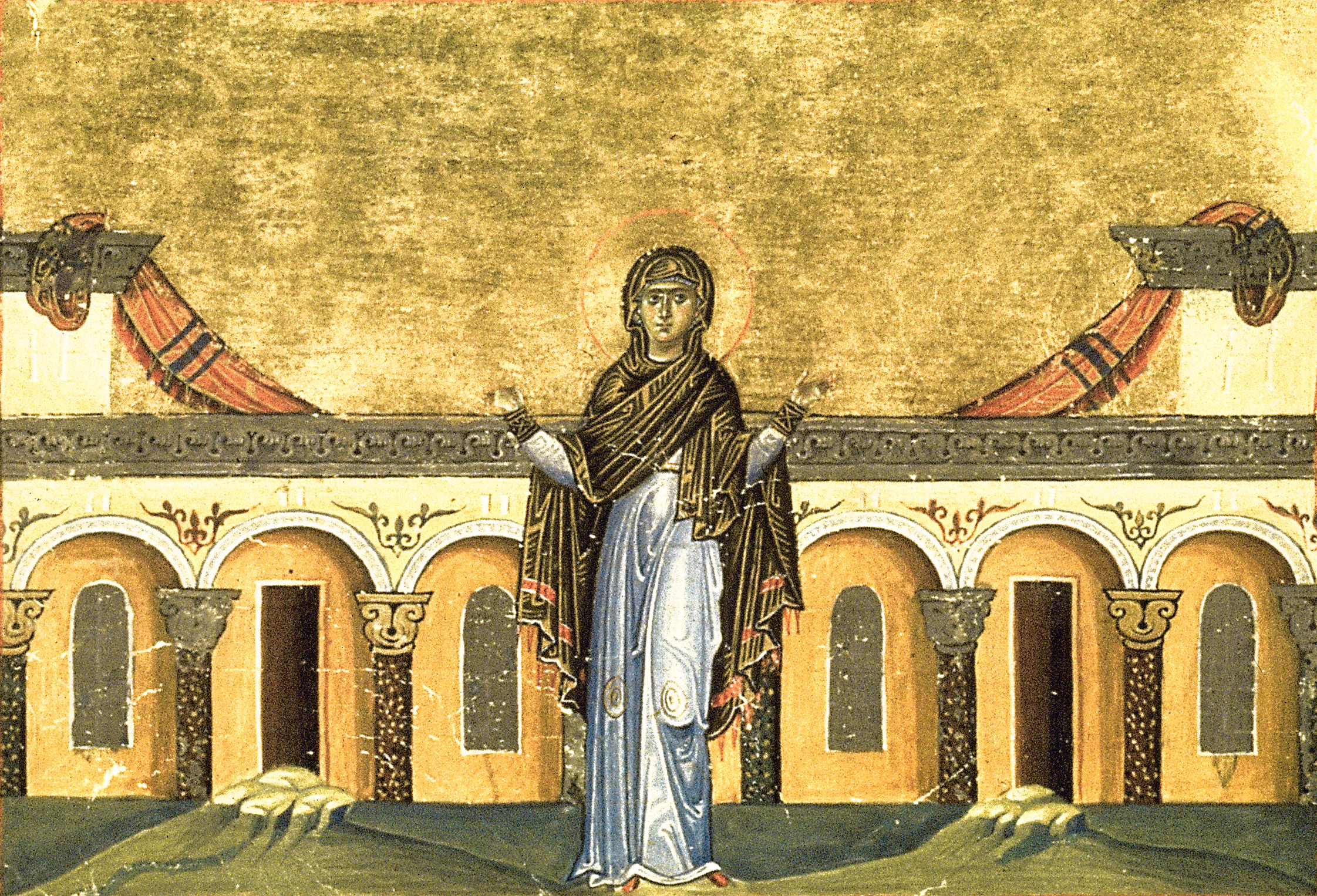
Saint Syncletica of Alexandria.
(Menologion of Basil II, 10th century).

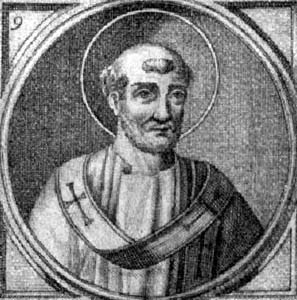
Hieromartyr Saint Telesphorus, Pope of Rome.

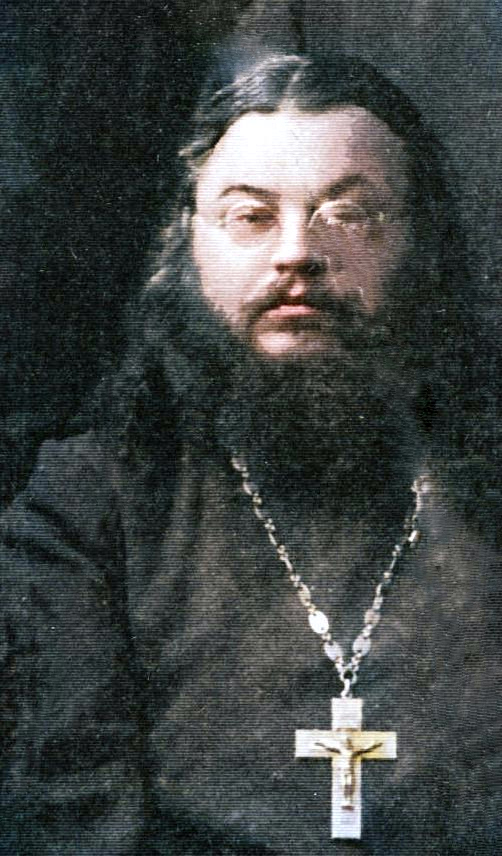
New Hieromartyr Andrew Zimin, Archpriest.

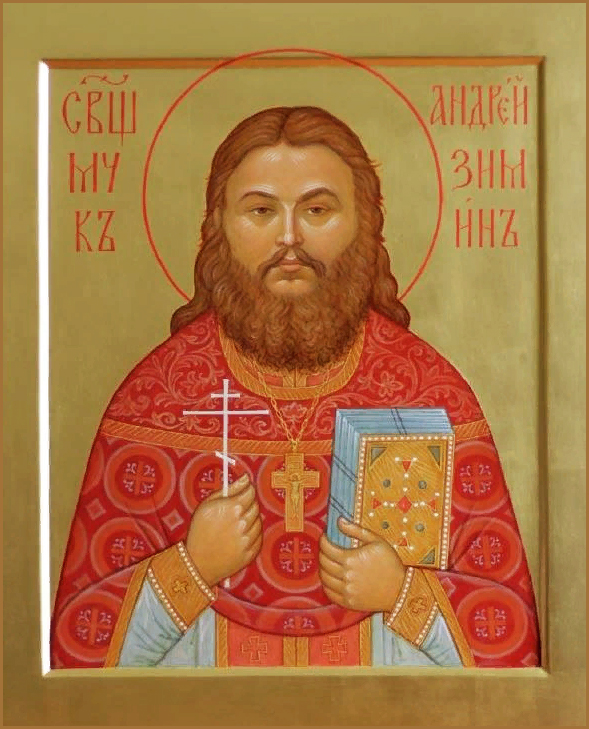
New Hieromartyr Andrew Zimin, Archpriest.

== Sources ==
- January 5/January 18. Orthodox Calendar (PRAVOSLAVIE.RU).
- January 18 / January 5. HOLY TRINITY RUSSIAN ORTHODOX CHURCH (A parish of the Patriarchate of Moscow).
- January 5. OCA - The Lives of the Saints.
- The Autonomous Orthodox Metropolia of Western Europe and the Americas (ROCOR). St. Hilarion Calendar of Saints for the year of our Lord 2004. St. Hilarion Press (Austin, TX). p. 5.
- January 5. Latin Saints of the Orthodox Patriarchate of Rome.
- The Roman Martyrology. Transl. by the Archbishop of Baltimore. Last Edition, According to the Copy Printed at Rome in 1914. Revised Edition, with the Imprimatur of His Eminence Cardinal Gibbons. Baltimore: John Murphy Company, 1916. p. 6.

Greek Sources

- Great Synaxaristes: (in Greek) 5 ΙΑΝΟΥΑΡΙΟΥ. ΜΕΓΑΣ ΣΥΝΑΞΑΡΙΣΤΗΣ.
- (in Greek) Συναξαριστής. 5 Ιανουαρίου. ECCLESIA.GR. (H ΕΚΚΛΗΣΙΑ ΤΗΣ ΕΛΛΑΔΟΣ).

Russian Sources

- (in Russian) 18 января (5 января). Православная Энциклопедия под редакцией Патриарха Московского и всея Руси Кирилла (электронная версия). (Orthodox Encyclopedia - Pravenc.ru).
- (in Russian) 5 января (ст.ст.) 18 января 2013 (нов. ст.). Русская Православная Церковь Отдел внешних церковных связей. (DECR).
