= List of people known as the Hermit =

The epithet "the Hermit" may be applied to:

- Anthony the Hermit (c. 468–c. 520), Christian saint
- Bluebeard the Hermit (died 1450), a leader of the English uprising generally known as Jack Cade's Rebellion
- Elias the Hermit, 4th century ascetic saint and monk
- Eusebius the Hermit, 4th century Eastern Orthodox saint and monk
- Felix the Hermit, 9th century Roman Catholic saint, fisherman and hermit
- Saint Giles (c. 650–c. 710), Greek saint
- Gustav the Hermit (c. 810–890), Swedish Catholic saint
- Harry Hallowes (c. 1936–2016), Irishman famous for living on Hampstead Heath, London
- John of Egypt, 4th century hermit and Eastern Orthodox and Eastern Catholic saint
- Juan de Ortega (hermit) (1080–1163), better known as John the Hermit, Spanish Roman Catholic priest hermit and saint
- John of Tufara (1084–1170), Italian hermit and saint
- Marcus Eremita, 5th century Christian theologian and ascetic writer
- Matthew the Hermit, 4th century Oriental Orthodox saint
- Palladius of Antioch (died 390), saint in the Roman Empire
- Paphnutius the Ascetic, 4th century saint and Egyptian anchorite
- Pardus the Hermit (died 6th century), Eastern Orthodox saint
- Peter the Hermit (died 1115), priest and key figure in the First Crusade
- Phosterius the Hermit, 7th century Byzantine saint
- Thomas the Hermit, early Egyptian Coptic Orthodox saint
- Venerius the Hermit (c. 560–630), monk, hermit and Catholic saint
- Zeno the Hermit, 5th century saint
- Zosimus the Hermit, 3rd century saint and ascetic

== See also ==
- Paul of Thebes (died c. 341), saint regarded as the first Christian hermit
- Peter the Hermit of Galatia, 5th century saint
- Theodore of the Jordan, called the Hermit of the Jordan, 6th century hermit and Eastern Orthodox saint
- Christopher Thomas Knight, called the Hermit of the North Pond, 21st century hermit
