= January 4 (Eastern Orthodox liturgics) =

Day in the Eastern Orthodox liturgical calendar

Eastern Orthodox liturgical calendar
January 3	January 4	January 5
January 4 O.S. ≍ January 17 N.S. January 4 N.S ≍ December 22 O.S.

An Eastern Orthodox cross

January 4 in Eastern Orthodox liturgical calendars is a feast day and a day of commemoration of saints and martyrs. Although some Orthodox churches use the Revised Julian Calendar and others use the traditional Julian calendar, the fixed commemorations for their respective January 4 are broadly the same, no matter which calendar is used. (Note: Despite the dates being the same, the days to which they refer typically differ by 13 days. The notation Old Style or O.S. is sometimes used to indicate a date in the traditional Julian Calendar (the "Old Calendar"). The notation New Style or N.S, indicates a date in the Revised Julian calendar (the "New Calendar").)

== Feasts ==
- Forefeast of the Theophany (Note: The third day of the Forefeast of Theophany falls on January 4. The hymns compare the Feast of the Nativity with the coming Feast. "There shepherds saw the Child and were amazed; here the voice of the Father proclaims the only-begotten Son.")

== Saints ==
- Synaxis of the Seventy Apostles (Note: A widely accepted canon for the Seventy Apostles in the Orthodox Church is given in "The Great Collection of the Lives of the Saints, Volume 5: January", compiled by St. Demetrius of Rostov (†1709), who consulted the Holy Scripture, the traditions passed down by the Church Fathers, and the accounts of trustworthy historians in attempting to correct the mistakes and uncertainties in the traditional lists of St. Dorotheus of Tyre (†362), and St. Hippolytus of Rome (†235): James the Brother of the Lord; Mark the Evangelist; Luke the Evangelist; Cleopas the Brother of Righteous Joseph the Betrothed; Symeon the son of Cleopas; Barnabas; Justus; Thaddeus; Ananias; Stephen the Archdeacon, and Philip, Prochorus, Nicanor, Timon, and Parmenas of the seven deacons; Timothy; Titus; Philemon; Onesimus; Epaphras (Epaphroditus); Archippus; Silas; Silvanus; Crescens; Crispus; Epenetus; Andronicus; Stachys; Amplias; Urban; Narcissus, Apelles; Aristobulus; Herodion; Agabus; Rufus; Asyncritus; Phlegon; Hermes; Patrobus; Hermas; Linus; Gaius; Philologus; Luke (Lucius); Jason; Sosipater; Olympas; Tertius; Erastus; Quartus; Euodias; Onesiphorus; Clement; Sosthenes; Apollos; Tychicus; Epaphroditus; Carpus; Quadratus; Mark called John; Zenas; Aristarchus; Pudens; Trophimus; Mark; Artemas; Aquila; Fortunatus; Achaicus. Also: Dionysius the Areopagite, and Simeon Niger, who are numbered with the Seventy, bringing the total to seventy-two, the number mentioned in the variant reading of the Gospel, according to which "the Lord appeared unto the other seventy-two".)
- Martyr Djan Darada, the Ethiopian eunuch of Queen Candace (1st century) (see also: June 17, August 27)
- Martyrs Chrysanthus and Euphemia (Euthymia) in Constantinople.
- Martyrs Zosimas the Hermit and Athanasius the Commentarisius (prison warden), anchorites of Cilicia (3rd–4th century)
- Venerable Theoprobus of Karpasia, Bishop of Karpasia in Cyprus (4th century)
- Venerable Apollinaria of Egypt (5th century) (see also: January 5)
- Venerable Evagrius (fellow-ascetic of Saint Shio of Mgvime), with Saint Elias the Deacon, and other Disciples of the Thirteen Assyrian Fathers, of the Shio-Mgvime Monastery in Georgia (6th century)
- The Holy Six Martyrs. (Note: Although the Synaxaristes call them "Martyrs", they reposed peacefully.) (see also: January 15)
- Saint Euthymius the Younger, Monk of Thessalonica.
- Venerable Theoctistus, Abbot of Cucomo Monastery, in Sicily, who died in peace (800) (Note: "It has been suggested that this unknown monastery may be identified as that of St. Nicolas near Caccane" (i.e. "Abbazia di San Nicola De' Nemori", now reduced to a ruin, located in the open countryside at the foot of Mount San Calogero). "However, since St. Theoctistus is unknown in Sicily, there is possibly a confusion here with St. Theoctistus, the companion in ascesis of St. Euthymius the Great (3 Sept.), commemorated today in some ancient synaxaria.") (Note: Apolytikion in the Third Tone: "You have become God's, royal founder, carrying out your calling, with an orderly life, pleasing to God, in works of righteousness; wherefore Christ the lover of mankind, showed you to be a leader of monks, and He accepted your struggles. Do therefore intercede on behalf of those who cry: Rejoice divinely-minded Theoktistos." Kontakion in the Fourth Tone: "You rose out of the West, mystically illuminating the Church of Christ like a bright sun with the resplendent and sacred rays of your ascetical labors, all-blessed Father, Venerable Theoktistos.") (Note: See: (in Italian) Teotista. Wikipedia. (Italian Wikipedia).)
- Venerable Timothy the Stylite of Kakhshata (Kakhushta) (872)
- Hieromartyr Alexander, Bishop.
- Martyr Uvelicius.
- Martyr Amma.

== Pre-Schism Western saints ==
- Saint Linus, the first Pope of Rome (c. 76) (Note: A disciple of the Apostle Paul, he was one of the Seventy and is mentioned in 2 Timothy 4,21. He was Pope for twelve years (67–79) and is venerated as a martyr.) (see also: November 4, November 5)
- Saint Clement I, one of the Seventy Apostles, he was the third Pope of Rome (c. 101) (see also: September 10, November 25, April 22)
- Saint Mavilus (Majulus), a martyr in Hadrumetum in North Africa, thrown to wild beasts at the time of Caracalla (212) (Note: "At Adrumetum, in Africa, in the persecution of Severus, the commemoration of St. Mavilus, martyr, who, being condemned by the most cruel president Scapula to be devoured by wild beasts, received the crown of martyrdom.")
- Martyrs Priscus, Priscillian and Benedicta, in Rome (c. 361 – 363) (Note: "At Rome, in the reign of the impious Julian, the holy martyrs Priscus, priest, Priscillian, cleric, and Benedicta, a religious woman, who ended their martyrdom by the sword.")
- Martyr Dafrosa (Affrosa), the mother of Saint Bibiana, was martyred in Rome under Julian the Apostate (c. 361 – 363) (Note: "At Rome, under Julian the Apostate, blessed Dafrosa, wife of the martyr St. Flavian. After her husband had been killed, she was first banished, and then beheaded.")
- Martyrs Aquilinus, Geminus, Eugene, Marcian, Quintus, Theodotus and Tryphon, in North Africa under the Arian Hunneric, King of the Vandals (c. 484) (Note: The names Aquilinus and Geminus are also listed on February 4 as martyrs of central Italy.)
- Saint Gregory, Bishop of Langres in Gaul, renowned for miracles (539–540) (Note: A governor of Autun in France. Later in life he lost his wife, was ordained priest and became Bishop of Langres, gaining a reputation for gentleness and understanding. He was the father of St. Tetricus and the great-uncle of St. Gregory of Tours.)
- Saint Ferreolus of Uzès, Bishop of Uzès (581) (Note: Born in Narbonne in France, he became Bishop of Uzès. He devoted himself in particular to converting Jews and was exiled by King Childebert on that account. He also founded a monastery.)
- Saint Pharäildis (Vareide, Verylde, Veerle), one of the patron-saints of Ghent (c. 740)
- Saint Rigobert, Archbishop of Rheims and Confessor (c. 745) (Note: Monk and Abbot of Orbais in France, in 721 he became Archbishop of Rheims but some years later was banished by the Frank Charles Martel. He returned to Orbais and resumed monastic life. On being recalled to Rheims, he came to terms with the intruded bishop and himself became a hermit.)
- Saint Libentius (Liäwizo I), born in Swabia in Germany, he became Archbishop of Hamburg in 988 (1013)

== Post-Schism Orthodox saints ==
- Saint Jevstatije I (Eustathius I, Eustace I), Archbishop of Serbia (1286)
- Saint Aquila (Aquilae, Achillios), Deacon of the Kiev Caves (14th century) (Note: See: (in Russian) Ахила Печерский. Википедии. (Russian Wikipedia).)
- Venerable Symeon, Metropolitan of Smolensk (1699) (Note: See: (in Russian) Симеон (Молюков). Википедии. (Russian Wikipedia).)
- Venerable Nikephoros the Leper (1964) (Note: In March 2020 it was reported by Archimandrite Ananias Koustenis in Athens, that a pious man told him that Venerable Nikephoros the Leper had appeared to him, asking him to tell everyone not to fear the Coronavirus. But rather to pray for his intercessions and God would heal and protect them through his prayers. At the end of March 2020, Venerable Nikephoros was also reported as appearing in Bulgaria over a period of three consecutive nights, asking all Christians to pray for his intercessions to God and to read the services. An intercessory canon to St. Nikephoros has been published in Greek.) (Note: See: (in Greek) Όσιος Νικηφόρος ο Λεπρός. Βικιπαίδεια. (Greek Wikipedia).)

=== New martyrs and confessors ===
- New Venerable Hieromartyr Euthymius, Abbot, and twelve monk-martyrs of Vatopedi Monastery, Mount Athos, who suffered martyrdom for denouncing the Latinizing rulers Michael VIII Palaiologos and John XI Bekkos of Constantinople as heretics (1285)
- New Venerable Martyr Onuphrius Manassias of Gabrovo and Hilandar Monastery, Mount Athos, on Chios (1818)
- New Hieromartyrs Alexander Skalsky, Stephan Ponomarev, and Philip Grigoriev, Archpriests of Alma-Ata, Kazakhstan (1933)
- New Hieromartyr Mark Novoselov, Bishop of Sergievsk (1938)
- New Hieromartyr Nicholas Maslov, Priest of Alma-Ata, Kazakhstan (1939)
- New Hieromartyr Paul Felitsyn, Priest (1941)

== Other commemorations ==
- Finding of the holy relics (January 4, 1974) of New Martyr John the ex-Muslim of Konitsa (John of Ioannina) (September 23, 1814), in the Holy Monastery of Prousou in Evrytania, Greece.

== Icon gallery ==
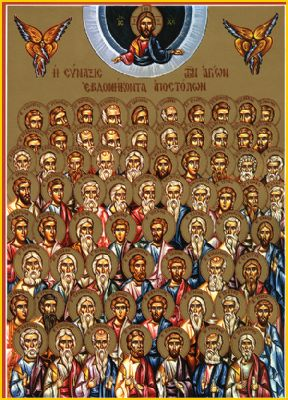
Icon of the Seventy Apostles.

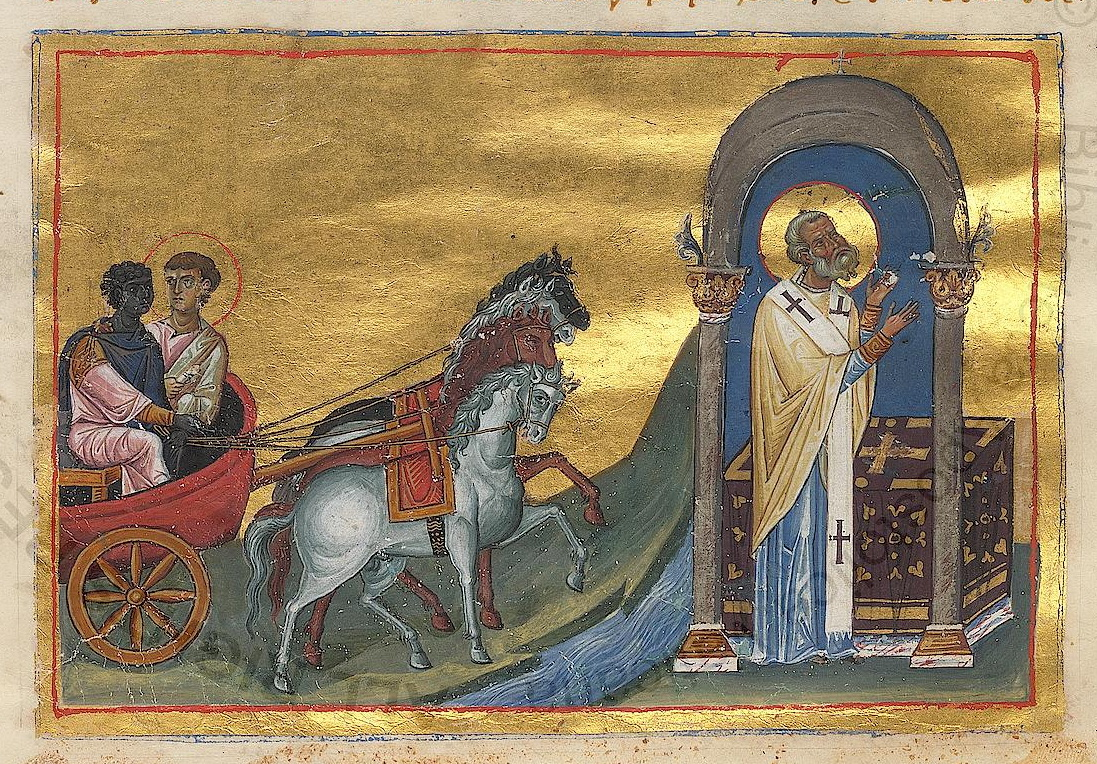
The Ethiopian eunuch with St. Philip the Deacon.
(Menologion of Basil II, 10th century).

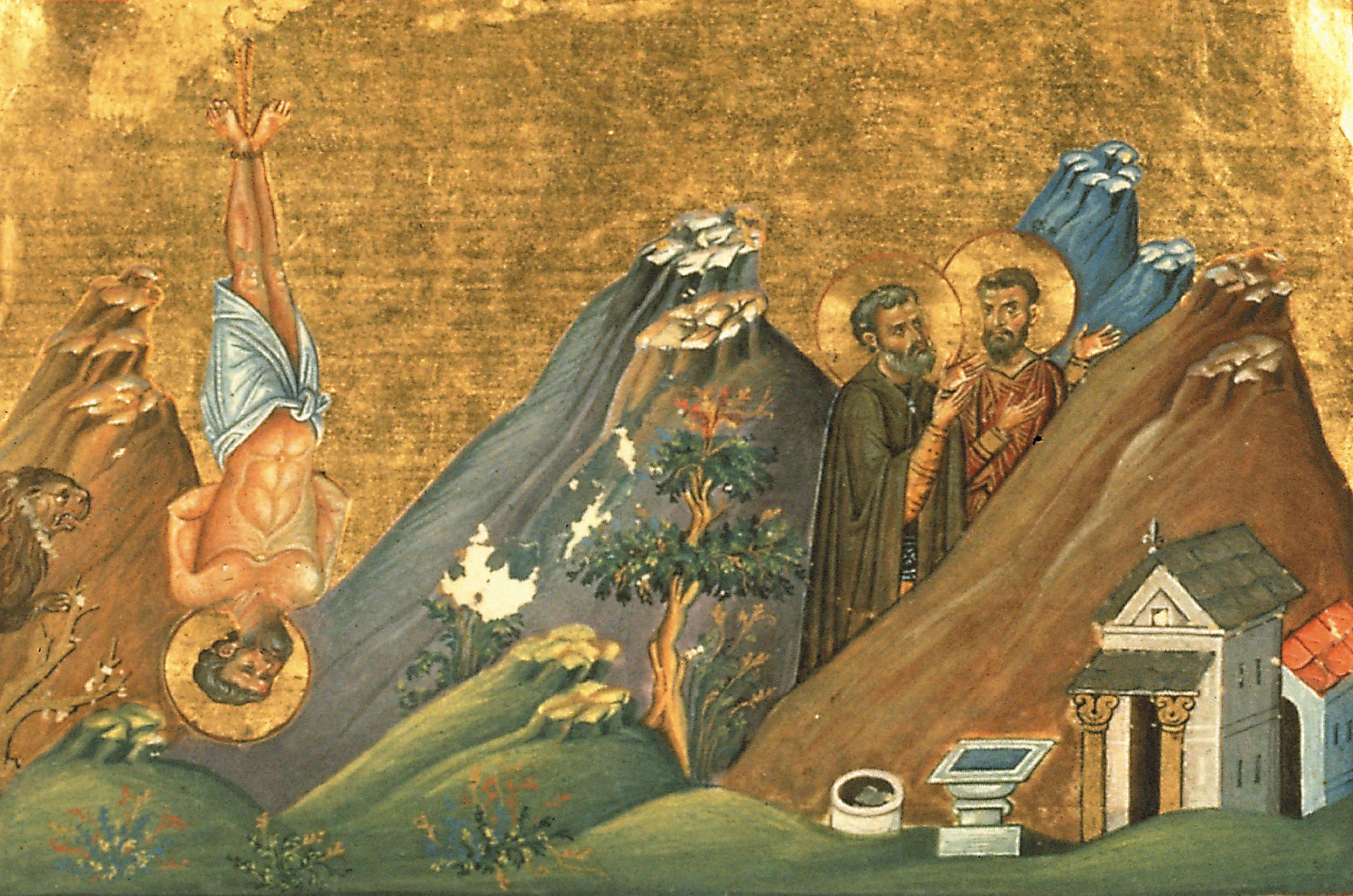
St. Zosimas the Hermit and Athanasius the Notary, anchorites of Cilicia.
(Menologion of Basil II, 10th century).

Venerable Theoctistus, Abbot of Cucomo Monastery, in Sicily.

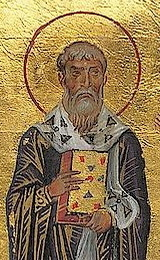
St. Linus, the first Pope of Rome.
(Menologion of Basil II, 10th century).

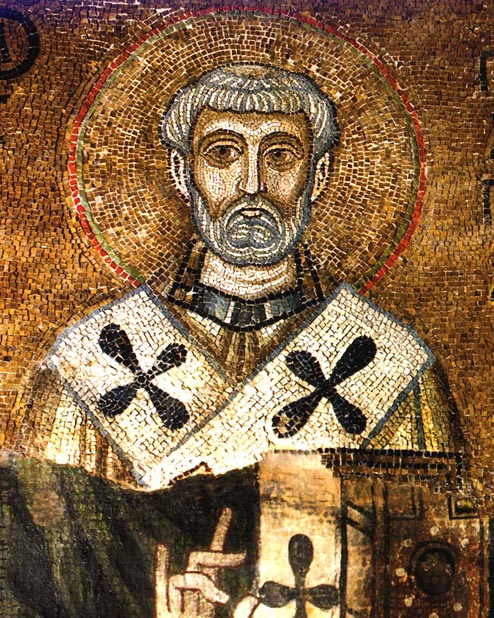
St. Clement I, one of the Seventy Apostles, and the third Pope of Rome.

St. Gregory, Bishop of Langres in Gaul.

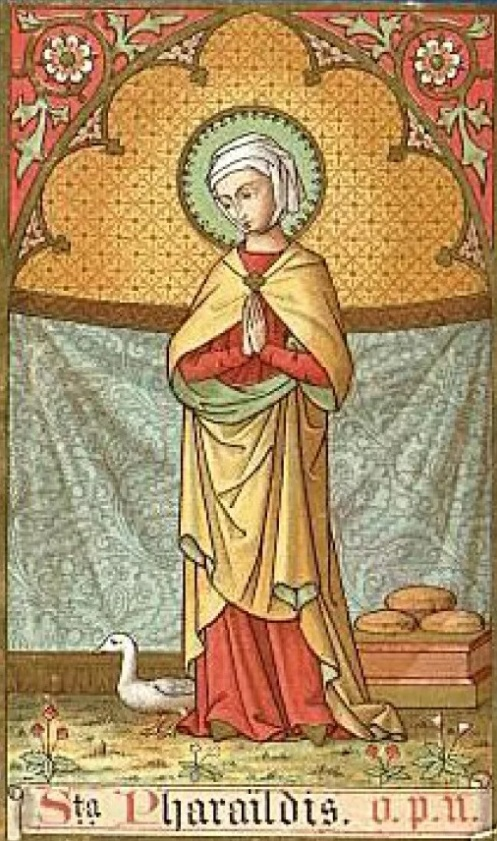
St. Pharäildis.

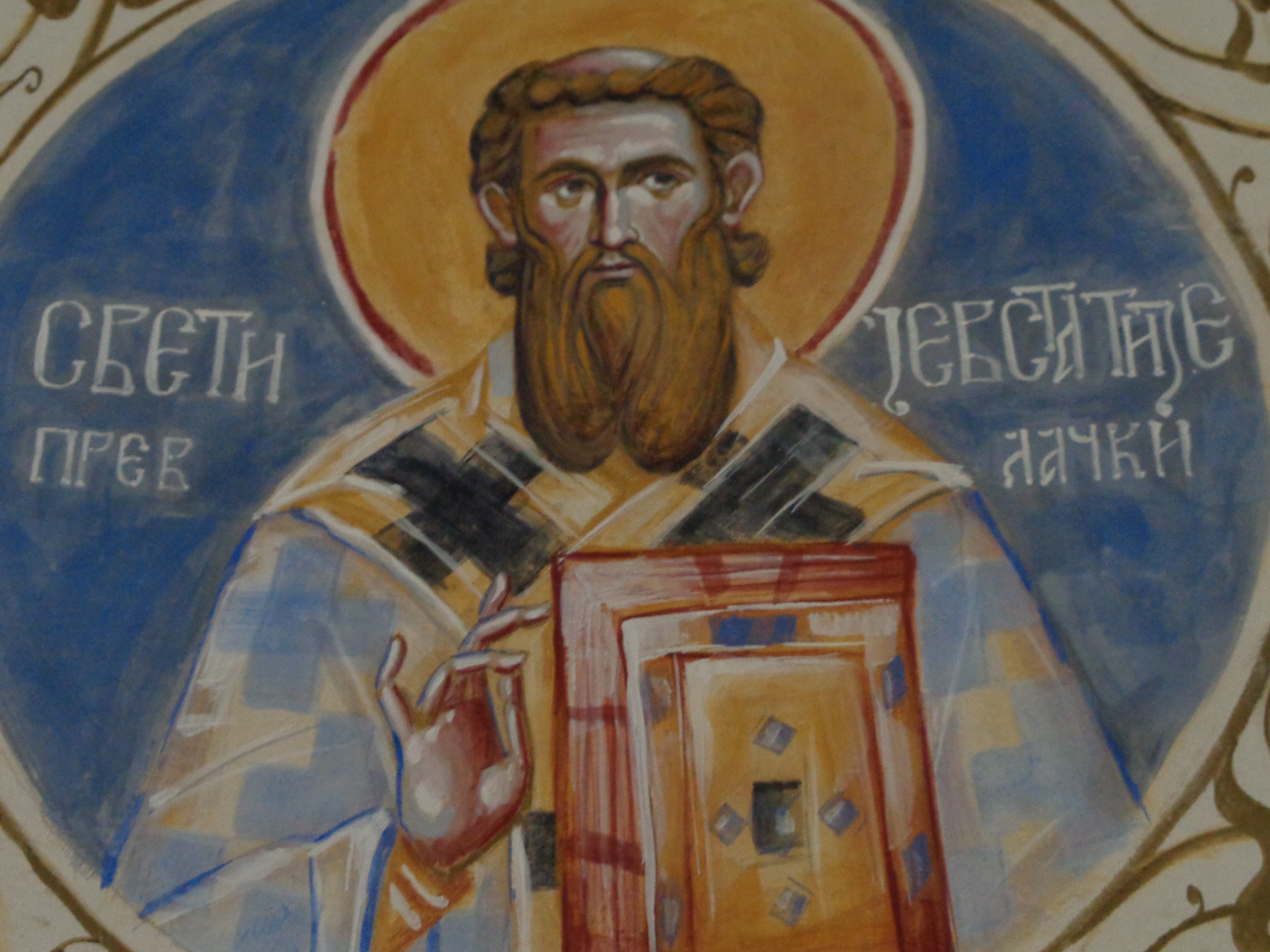
St. Jevstatije I (Eustathius I, Eustace I), Archbishop of Serbia.

St. Aquila (Aquilae, Achillios), Deacon of the Kiev Caves.

== Sources ==
- January 4/January 17. Orthodox Calendar (PRAVOSLAVIE.RU).
- January 17 / January 4. HOLY TRINITY RUSSIAN ORTHODOX CHURCH (A parish of the Patriarchate of Moscow).
- January 4. OCA - The Lives of the Saints.
- The Autonomous Orthodox Metropolia of Western Europe and the Americas (ROCOR). St. Hilarion Calendar of Saints for the year of our Lord 2004. St. Hilarion Press (Austin, TX). p. 5.
- January 4. Latin Saints of the Orthodox Patriarchate of Rome.
- The Roman Martyrology. Transl. by the Archbishop of Baltimore. Last Edition, According to the Copy Printed at Rome in 1914. Revised Edition, with the Imprimatur of His Eminence Cardinal Gibbons. Baltimore: John Murphy Company, 1916. pp. 5–6.

Greek Sources

- Great Synaxaristes: (in Greek) 4 ΙΑΝΟΥΑΡΙΟΥ. ΜΕΓΑΣ ΣΥΝΑΞΑΡΙΣΤΗΣ.
- (in Greek) Συναξαριστής. 4 Ιανουαρίου. ECCLESIA.GR. (H ΕΚΚΛΗΣΙΑ ΤΗΣ ΕΛΛΑΔΟΣ).

Russian Sources

- (in Russian) 17 января (4 января). Православная Энциклопедия под редакцией Патриарха Московского и всея Руси Кирилла (электронная версия). (Orthodox Encyclopedia - Pravenc.ru).
- (in Russian) 4 января (ст.ст.) 17 января 2013 (нов. ст.). Русская Православная Церковь Отдел внешних церковных связей. (DECR).
