= Desert Mothers =

Early Christian ascetics, 3rd–5th centuries AD

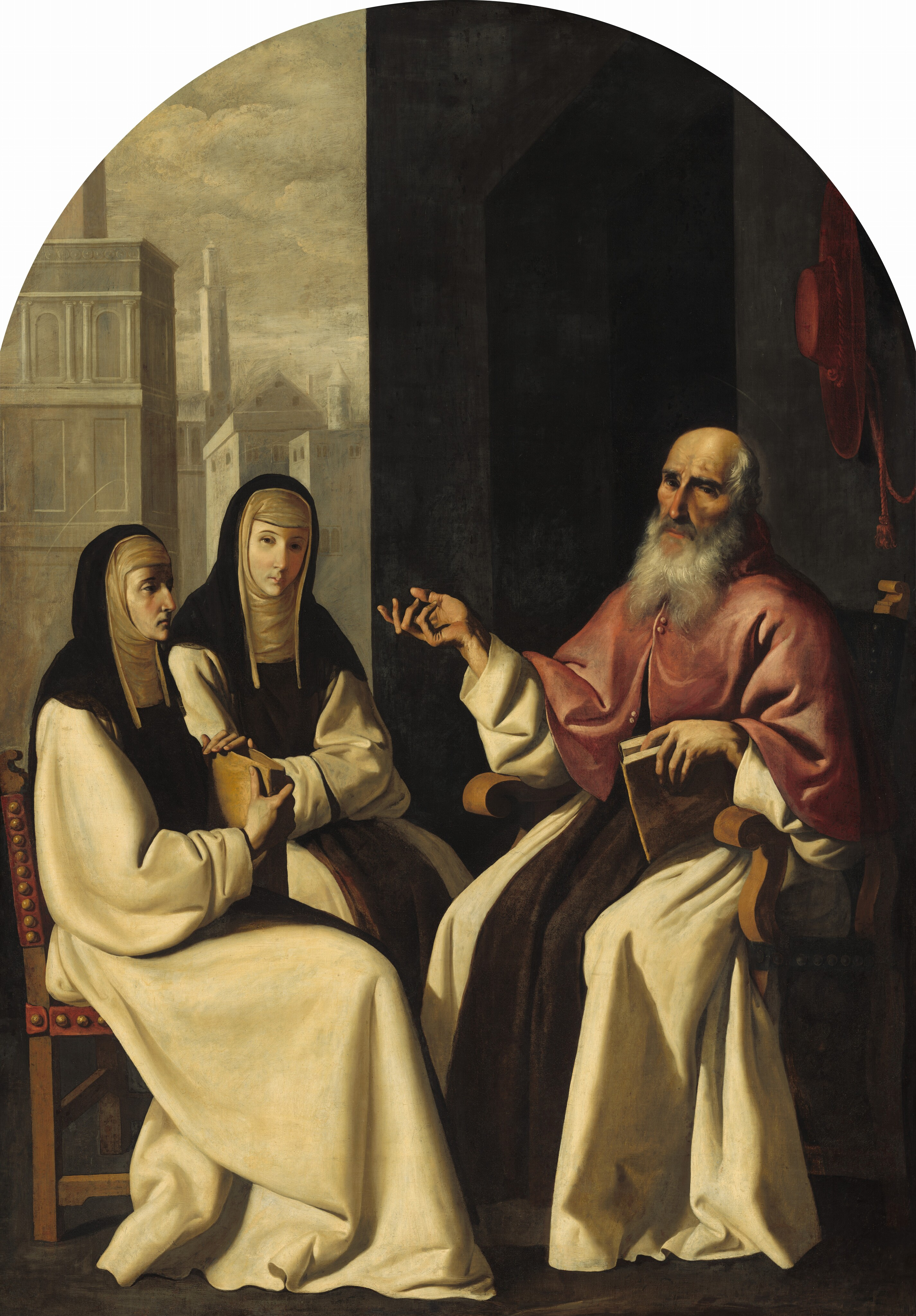
Desert Mothers Saint Paula and her daughter Eustochium with their spiritual advisor Saint Jerome—painting by Francisco de Zurbarán

Desert Mothers is a term analogous to Desert Fathers. The Desert Mothers were known as the ammas or female Christian ascetics living in the desert of Egypt, Palestine, and Syria in the 4th and 5th centuries AD. They typically lived in the monastic communities that began forming during that time, though sometimes they lived as hermits. Monastic communities acted collectively with limited outside relations with lay people. Some ascetics chose to venture into isolated locations to restrict relations with others, deepen spiritual connection, and other ascetic purposes. Other women from that era who influenced the early ascetic or monastic tradition while living outside the desert are also described as Desert Mothers.

The Desert Fathers are much more well known because most of the early lives of the saints "were written by men for a male monastic audience"—the occasional stories about the Desert Mothers come from the early Desert Fathers and their biographers. Due to the absence of male leadership mentioned in documental texts, it is suggested that desert women acted separately, with autonomy from their male counterparts. Many desert women had leadership roles within the Christian community. The Apophthegmata Patrum, or Sayings of the Desert Fathers, includes forty-seven sayings that are actually attributed to the Desert Mothers. There are several chapters dedicated to the Desert Mothers in the Lausiac History by Palladius, who mentions 2,975 women living in the desert. Other sources include the various stories told over the years about the lives of saints of that era, traditionally called vitae ("life"). The lives of twelve female desert saints are described in Book I of Vitae Patrum (Lives of the Fathers).

== Christian asceticism ==
Christian asceticism involved the self-discipline and deprivation of bodily "worldly" desires. Ascetics practiced abstinence and honored virginity, as sexual behavior and lust were "worldly desires." Ascetics also practiced fasting and the deprivation of water and sleep to ensure focus on discipline and chasteness. Values of asceticism encouraged the relinquishing of items of "worldly" value; including, but not limited to, money, property, hygiene, water, food, and rest. Female ascetics were socially known and referred to as "virgins" due to the intentionality of a chaste body and mind. Varied types of female asceticism existed as women could enter into domestic, monastic, or anchoretic lifestyles.

== Notable examples ==
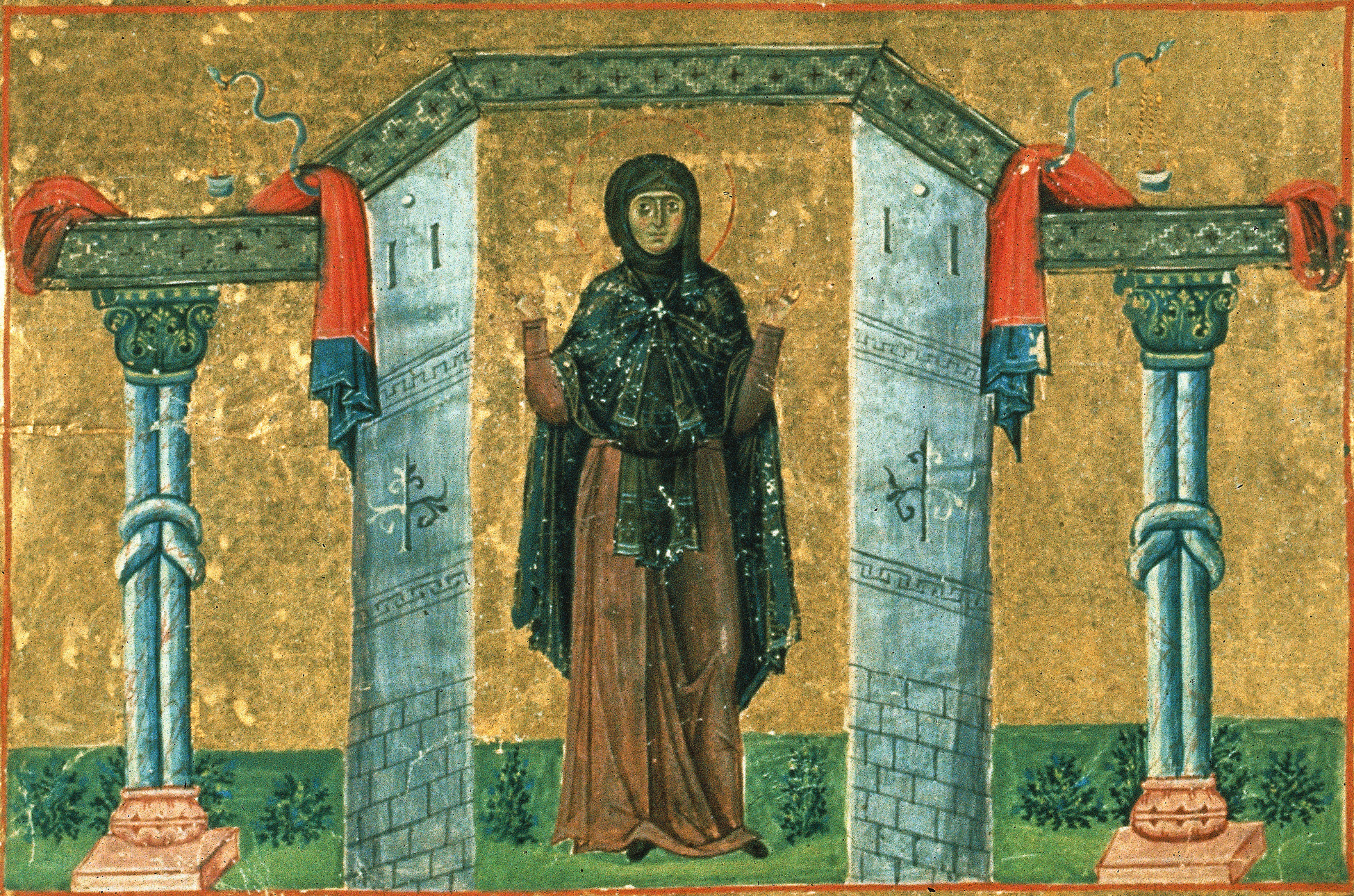
Melania the Younger, from the Menologion of Basil II

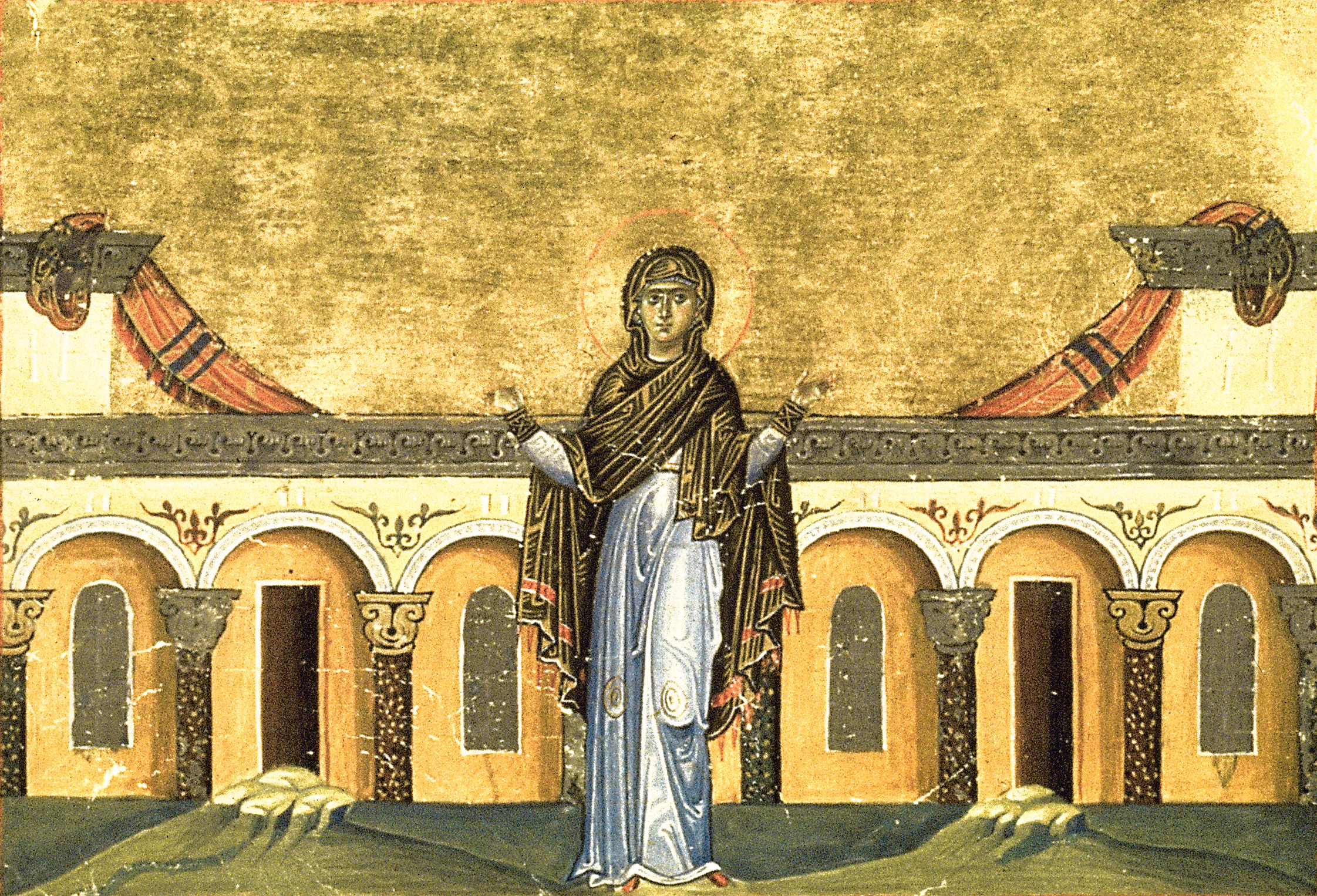
Syncletica of Alexandria from the Menologion of Basil II

The Desert Mothers were known as ammas ("spiritual mothers"), comparable to the Desert Fathers (abbas), due to the respect they earned as spiritual teachers and directors. One of the most well known Desert Mothers was Amma Syncletica of Alexandria, who had twenty-seven sayings attributed to her in the Sayings of the Desert Fathers. Two other ammas, Amma Theodora and Amma Sarah of the Desert, also had sayings in that book. Desert Mothers described in the Lausiac History include Melania the Elder, Melania the Younger, Olympias, Saint Paula and her daughter Eustochium, and several women whom the author does not name.

According to written accounts, Amma Syncletica might have been born around AD 270, since she is said to have lived to her eighties in about AD 350, to wealthy parents in Alexandria and was well educated, including an early study of the writings of Desert Father Evagrius Ponticus. After the death of her parents, she sold everything she had and gave the money to the poor. The giving up of property, money, and items of value was a pinnacle of asceticism, due to the worldly value placed on such items. Moving outside the city with her blind sister, she lived as a hermit among the tombs outside of Alexandria. Gradually a community of women ascetics grew up around her, who she served as their spiritual mother. Even though she was an ascetic and hermit, Syncletica taught moderation, and that asceticism was not an end in itself.

Amma Theodora was the amma of a monastic community of women. It can't be the same Theodora as Theodora of Alexandria, who had fled to the desert disguised as a man and joined a community of monks, and could not have founded a woman's monastery, since she spend all her ascetic life as a monk. Amma Theodora was sought out by many of the Desert Fathers for advice—reportedly Bishop Theophilus of Alexandria came to her for counsel.

Sarah of the Desert's sayings indicate that she was a hermit living by a river for sixty years. Her sharp replies to some of the old men who challenged her show a distinctly strong personality. According to one story, two male anchorites visited her in the desert and decided, "Let's humiliate this old woman." They said to her, "Be careful not to become conceited thinking to yourself: 'Look how anchorites are coming to see me, a mere woman.'" She replied, "According to nature I am a woman, but not according to my thoughts."

Melania the Elder, the daughter of a Roman official, became widowed at a young age and moved to Alexandria, and then to the Nitrian Desert. She met several of the Desert Fathers, following them in their travels and ministering to them using her own money. At one point she was thrown into prison for supporting them, after several of the Fathers had been banished by the officials in Palestine. She eventually founded a convent in Jerusalem which had about fifty nuns. Melania the Elder is an example of female power and leadership within Christian asceticism due to the influence she held in the region with the founding of monasteries and convents. Melania the Elder was also educated and held the ability to read and write, separating her from other ascetic leaders and women. Her granddaughter, Melania the Younger, was married at the age of thirteen and had two sons, both of whom died at a young age. When she was twenty, she and her husband Pinianus renounced the world, both founding convents and monasteries.

According to Averil Cameron, women were quite prominent in the desert tradition, even though early accounts often leave women nameless. In Cameron’s opinion there is no distinction between the men’s wise sayings and that of Amma Sarah and Amma Syncletia. One text refers to Theodora, who had monks listening to her counsel and asking questions. Some women converted their houses into religious establishments and there were sex-mixed social/religious groups. Women could not obtain ordination as a deacon or a priest.

Desert Mothers are honored with a Lesser Feast on the liturgical calendar of the Episcopal Church in the United States of America on January 5.

== Sayings ==
- Amma Sarah said, "If I prayed God that all people should approve of my conduct, I should find myself a penitent at the door of each one, but I shall rather pray that my heart may be pure toward all."
- Amma Syncletica said, "In the beginning there are a great many battles and a good deal of suffering for those who are advancing towards God and afterwards, ineffable joy. It is like those who wish to light a fire; at first they are choked by the smoke and cry, and by this means obtain what they seek ... so we must also kindle the divine fire in ourselves through tears and hard work."
- Amma Syncletica said, "There are many who live in the mountains and behave as if they were in the town; they are wasting their time. It is possible to be a solitary in one's mind while living in a crowd; and it is possible for those who are solitaries to live in the crowd of their own thoughts."
- Amma Theodora said that neither asceticism, nor vigils, nor any kind of suffering are able to save. Only true humility can do that. There was a hermit who was able to banish the demons. And he asked them: "What makes you go away? Is it fasting?" They replied: "We do not eat or drink." "Is it vigils?" They said: "We do not sleep." "Then what power sends you away?" They replied: "Nothing can overcome us except humility alone." Amma Theodora said: "Do you see how humility is victorious over the demons?"

== Origin of the expression 'Desert Mothers' ==
The expression "Desert Mothers" seems to have first been used in the early 1980s. In 1984, Margot H King circulated a Study Paper The Desert Mothers: A survey of the Female Anchoretic Tradition in Western Europe. That Study Paper is based on lectures Margot King had delivered at Madison, Wisconsin in 1980. In 1989, Peregrina Publishing of Toronto, Ontario, Canada published Margot King's book The Desert Mothers.

By 1991, Henri Nouwen's 1981 book The Way of the Heart: Desert Spirituality and Contemporary Ministry (Seabury Press of New York) was being re-badged as The Way of the Heart: The Spirituality of the Desert Fathers and Mothers (Bravo Press).

In her 1984 Study Paper, Margot King says that she began this study in 1980 and, in the third paragraph, she writes My choice of the term "Desert Mothers" had its origin in a mildly flippant attempt to make up for the unwittingly myopic vision of monastic historians who, it would seem, saw the Egyptian desert as being populated only by men and, hence, the whole history of monasticism as being a male phenomenon. If the male desert monastics are called "patres", why not apply its feminine equivalent "matres" to Sara, Syncetica and their followers, she wrote. Margot Kings says that, as she continued her study, she realized that my apparent flippancy had a solid basis in fact.

== See also ==
- Blaesilla
- Catherine of Alexandria
- Christian monasticism
- Demiana
- Domnina of Syria
- Eastern Christian monasticism
- John Chryssavgis
- Macrina the Elder
- Macrina the Younger
- Margaret the Virgin
- Mary of Egypt
- Menodora, Metrodora, and Nymphodora
- Paula of Rome
- Saint Pelagia
- Theoktiste of Lesbos
