= Apollinaris Syncletica =

5th-century saint and hermit

Saint Apollinaris Syncletica
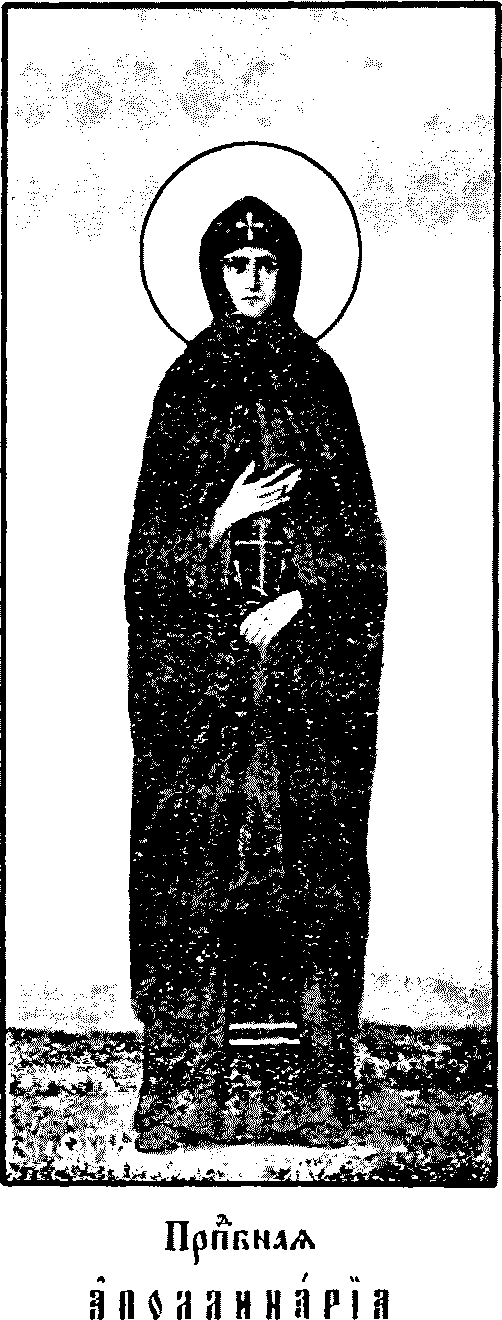

Venerable
- Born: Constantinople (modern-day Istanbul, Turkey)
- Died: 420 or 470; Egypt
- Venerated in: Eastern Orthodox Church; Roman Catholic Church
- Feast: 4 January (Greek Orthodox); 5 January (Roman Catholic and Slavic Orthodox)

Apollinaris Syncletica (Medieval Greek: Απολινάριος Συγκλητική), also known as Apollinaria of Egypt, was a saint and hermit of the 5th century, venerated in the Eastern Orthodox Church and Roman Catholic Church. Her story is most likely apocryphal and "turns on the familiar theme of a girl putting on male attire and living for many years undiscovered".

== Hagiography ==
The legend of Apollinaris Syncletica was likely based on those of Syncletica of Alexandria and Theodora of Alexandria, two of the Desert Mothers. Although Apollinaris Syncletica was listed as a saint in the Roman Martyrology, her story, set in late antiquity, is most likely apocryphal, and has been called "a pious fiction", "so much like a romance", and "a religious romance".

Her namesake Syncletica of Alexandria is the subject of the Vita S. Syncleticæ, a Greek hagiography purportedly by Athanasius of Alexandria (d. 373) but not in fact written before 450. She then appears as amma Syncletica, an anchorite whose sayings are included in the Apophthegmata Patrum, compiled c.480–500. The legend of Theodora of Alexandria, like that of Apollinaris Syncletica, involves a holy woman and ascetic living as a male monk.

The 10th century Byzantine hagiographer Symeon the Metaphrast stated that Apollinaris was the daughter of the emperor Anthemius, but it is more likely that her father was a consular prefect in Constantinople. It is probable that both the hagiographic association with the emperor of the Western Empire and her connection with Macarius of Alexandria (d. 390) were added to her story to enhance her spiritual authority.

== Life ==
=== Early life ===
According to the tale, Apollinaris' parents wanted her to marry a wealthy man at a young age, but she refused and persuaded them into allowing her to remain unmarried. She wanted to "retire completely from the world", like the Egyptian recluses she admired.

=== Religious life ===
Her parents permitted her to take a pilgrimage to Jerusalem, where she freed and dismissed all the slaves that accompanied her, except for an elderly man and a eunuch to prepare her tent, and bribed an old woman to procure a habit for her. On her way back home, while visiting the Egyptian coast, she escaped her companions, "assumed the monastic habit, and cast aside her worldly dress, with all its ornaments". She fled into the desert, but her companions could not find her, even after eliciting the assistance of a local governor. Her parents, when told of what happened, assumed that Apollinaris had entered a community of religious women.

Apollinaris made her way to Wadi El Natrun, a desert valley in the Nitrian Desert west of the Nile Delta, where she joined a large monastery of recluses living in caves and cells, run by Macarius of Alexandria. She was able to disguise herself as a man and assumed the name Dorotheus. Her sister had, in the meantime, become possessed by a demon, so her parents sent her to Macarius, who was famous for healing. Macarius, "moved by some interior impulse", insisted that Dorotheus heal the girl. When the girl was restored, she was returned to her parents, but she became ill again and her parents assumed that she had become pregnant. The girl accused Dorotheus of seducing her, so they demanded that Dorotheus be brought to them so he could answer the charge, and Apollinaris revealed herself to them as their daughter. She spent a few days with them and returned to the desert, where she remained for the rest of her life.

== Death and legacy ==
Apollinaris' gender was not discovered by her fellow hermits until her death in 420 or 470. The hagiographer Alban Butler said, about her story, that "it turns on the familiar theme of a girl putting on male attire and living for many years undiscovered". The Roman Catholic Church celebrates her feast day on 4 January; the Eastern Orthodox Church celebrates it on 5 January. Syncletica's name was removed from the Roman calendar of saints in 2001.

== Works cited ==
- Baring-Gould, Sabine (1877). The Lives of the Saints (3rd ed.). London: J. Hodges. pp. 70–72.
- Veder, William R. (2006). "Saint Syncletica and the Sea: A Text Come To Life". Russian History. 33 (2/4): 153–162. ISSN 0094-288X. JSTOR 24664437.
