= Theoktiste of Lesbos =

Saint of the Eastern Orthodox Church and the Catholic Church

Saint Theoktiste of Lesbos
- Born: c. 820; Methymna, Byzantine Empire
- Died: c. 870; Paros, Byzantine Empire
- Honored in: Eastern Orthodox Church
- Feast: 9 November

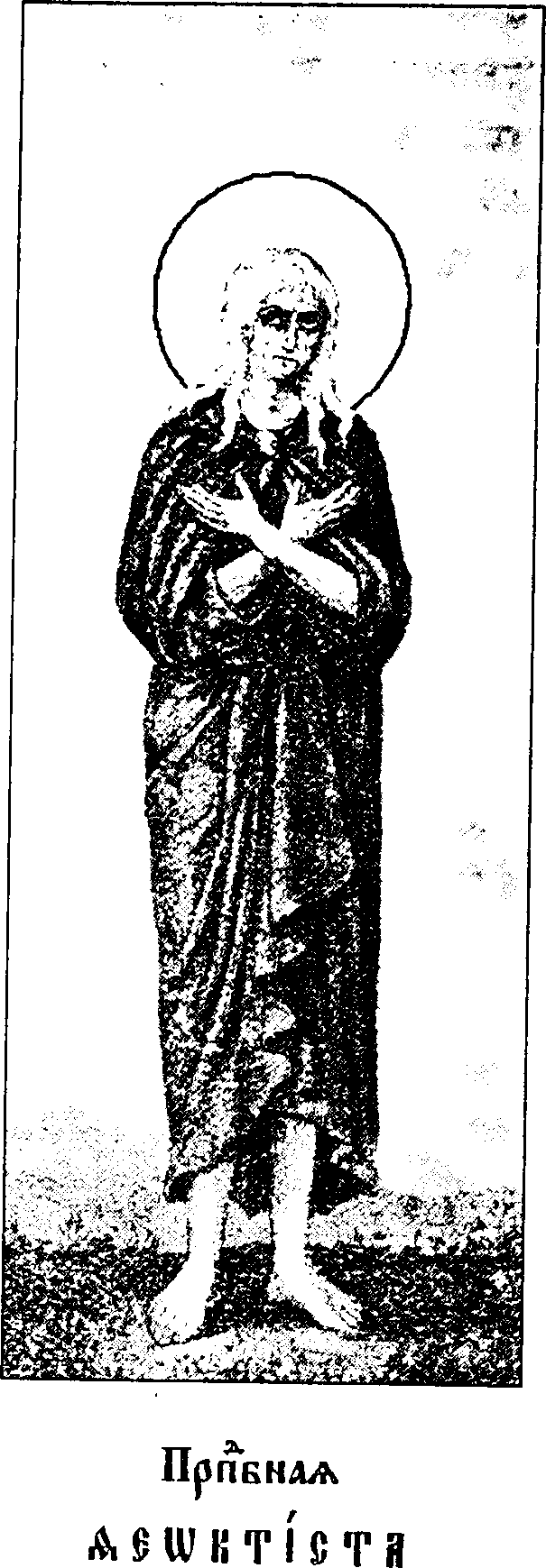

Theoktiste of Lesbos (Ancient Greek: Θεοκτίστη τῆς Λέσβου) is a saint of the Eastern Orthodox Church and the Catholic Church.

== Life ==
According to her hagiography, she was born in Methymna on the island of Lesbos, probably in the first quarter of the 9th century. Orphaned as a child, her relations brought her to a monastery where she was raised. On Easter in her 18th year (perhaps the year 837), she went to visit her sister in her village, but was captured along with her sister and other local villagers by Saracen raiders. At the island of Paros, she was able to escape her captors, and lived in solitude there for 35 years, until she was found by a hunter (sometime in the 870s). Theoktiste died soon after, in early autumn, and the hunter buried her. He also cut off her hand as a relic, but after that strong winds prevented him leaving the island until he returned the hand to the grave, after which the corpse disappeared. The tale of Theoktiste's life was told by the hunter thirty years later to another hermit called Symeon, who in turn retold the story to the author of the hagiography, Niketas Magistros. Her feast day is on 9 November.

== Hagiography and iconography ==
Niketas Magistros composed the Life of Theoktiste ca. 920, modelled on the life of Mary of Egypt, but altered to suit the events and environment of 9th-century Byzantium, particularly the ever-present Saracen pirate menace following the establishment of the Emirate of Crete in the 820s. Due to her association with Mary of Egypt, she is depicted in a similar manner in icons: "a thin woman with white hair, who is barefoot and wears a ragged cloak that covers barely half her body." The Life was later reworked slightly by Symeon Metaphrastes, who put her feast day on 10 November.

== See also ==
- Syncletica of Alexandria
- Sarah of the Desert

== Sources ==
- Kazhdan, Alexander; Ševčenko, Nancy Patterson (1991). "Theoktiste of Lesbos". In Kazhdan, Alexander (ed.). The Oxford Dictionary of Byzantium. Oxford and New York: Oxford University Press. pp. 2055–2056. ISBN 0-19-504652-8.
- Lilie, Ralph-Johannes; Ludwig, Claudia; Pratsch, Thomas; Zielke, Beate (2001). Prosopographie der mittelbyzantinischen Zeit: 1. Abteilung (641–867), Band 4: Platon (# 6266) – Theophylaktos (# 8345) (in German). Berlin and Boston: De Gruyter. ISBN 978-3-11-016674-3.
