= Sarah of the Desert =

Desert mother

Saint Sarah of the Desert

Nun, Desert Mother
- Born: 4th century Egypt
- Died: 5th century Egypt
- Venerated in: Oriental Orthodox Churches; Eastern Orthodox Church; Catholic Church; Episcopal Church
- Feast: 15 Paremhat (Coptic Christianity); 13 July (Chalcedonian); 5 January (Episcopal Church)
- Patronage: Nun

Amma (Mother) Sarah of the Desert (5th century) was one of the early Desert Mothers who is known to us today through the collected Sayings of the Desert Fathers and of the Holy Women Ascetics (the Matericon). She was a hermit and followed a life dedicated to strict asceticism for some sixty years.

== Monasticism ==
Sarah is said to have dwelt in a monastic cell near a large river, likely the Nile, at which she would never look. Her sayings attest that this saint spent her life battling a demon that tempted her to fornication. Records indicate that Sarah lived near Skete in the early to mid-5th century. She lived a life of severe asceticism, refusing wine, laughter, or to leave her cell except to attend church.

She was not completely isolated and received visitors during her time as a hermit. On one occasion, monks of Scetis came to visit her. She gave them a fruit basket and they honored her by eating the bad fruit and leaving her the good fruit to eat.

== Sayings ==
Among her sayings recorded in the Sayings of the Desert Fathers are:

- "I put out my foot to ascend the ladder, and I place death before my eyes before going up it."
- "It is good to give alms for men's sake. Even if it is only done to please men, through it one can begin to seek to please God."

Among her saying recorded in the Mataericon are:

- "I fear three things: when the soul must depart from the body, when I must be presented to God, and when the last decree will be made about me on the day of Judgment. Thinking upon this I am terrified and tremble."
- "Be as though you were dead: do not care about human dishonor; nor about worldly glory; in stillness, retreat into your cell; continually remember only God and death, and you will be saved."

== Veneration ==
Sarah is commemorated on 13 July in the Eastern Orthodox and Roman Catholic Churches.

Sarah is honored (with Theodora and Syncletica) on the liturgical calendar of the Episcopal Church in the United States of America on January 5.

== See also ==
- Amma Syncletica
- Mary of Egypt
- Theoctiste of Lesbos

== Sources ==
- Catholic Online
