= Bluebeard the Hermit =

15th-century English rebel

Thomas Cheyny (died 1450), also known as Bluebeard the Hermit, was a fuller in Kent who posed as a hermit while inciting unrest. He was a leader in Canterbury of the uprising generally known as Jack Cade's Rebellion for which on 9 February 1450 he was captured and shortly afterward hung and quartered.

His capture and execution were unpopular with the people to such a degree that the sheriffs of London requested that the remains be taken (and exhibited) elsewhere. The body was quartered and beheaded, with the head being put on display over the Westgate Towers in Canterbury. When confirming the liberties of the citizens in 1453, Henry VI commended their fidelity in the arrest of the traitor "who called himself Blewberd the hermit".
