= Phosterius the Hermit =

Saint Phosterius the Hermit was a 7th-century Anatolian Christian hermit. He is commemorated on January 5/18, in the Eastern Orthodox and Byzantine Catholic Churches.

Tradition says that he dwelt on a high mountain most likely in the wilderness of modern-day Turkey and was fed by an angel.

Phosterius gained renown amongst his contemporaries during the Iconoclastic Controversy in the seventh century. Due to the testimony to the truth of the Christian faith given by the witness of his holy life many people left the heresy of Iconoclasm. Holweck says "[h]is story, may, however, be fictitious."

== See also ==
- Christian monasticism
- Stylites
