= Theopemptus of Nicomedia =

Saint and Bishop

Saint Theopemptus of Nicomedia
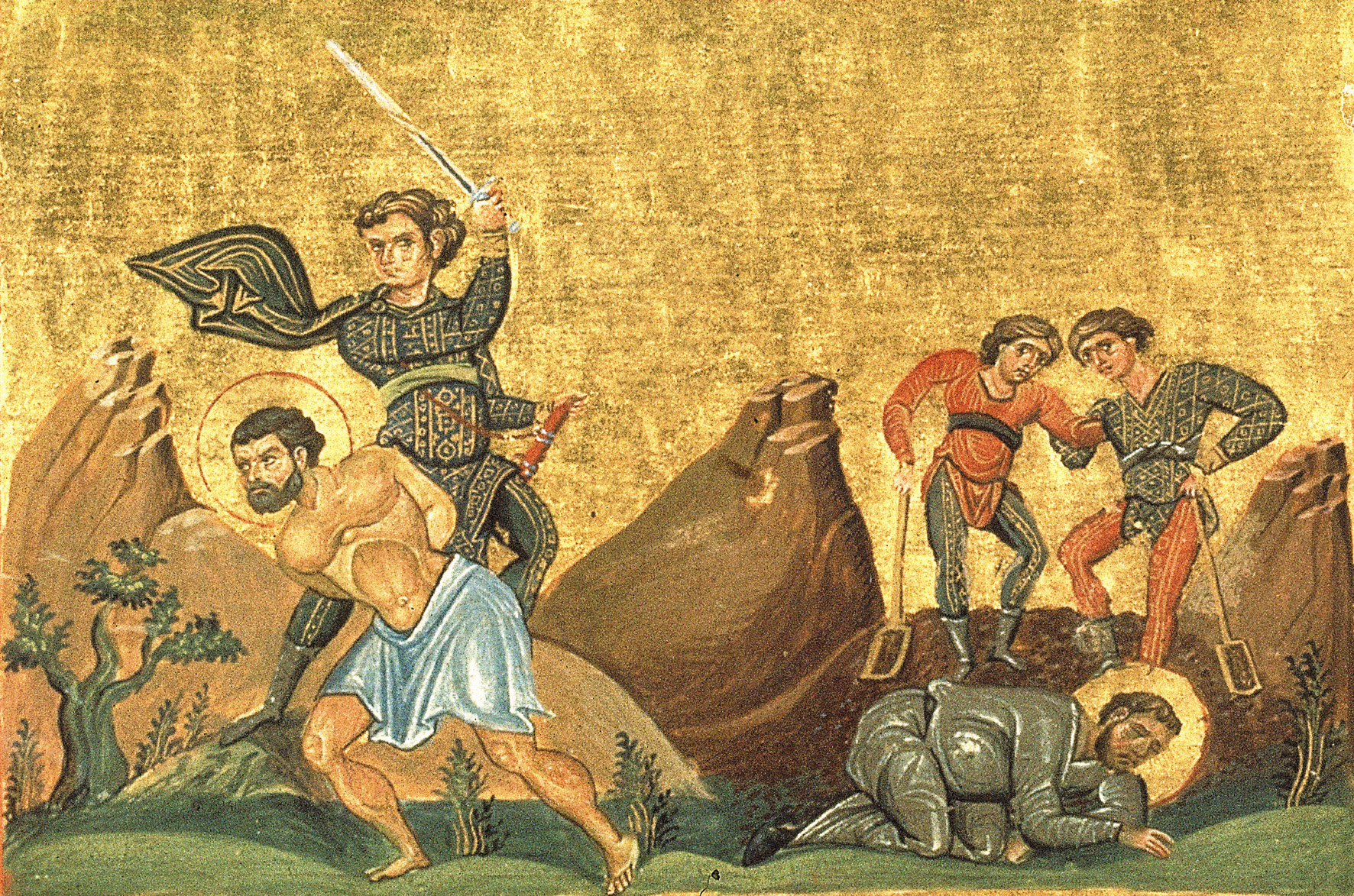
- Painting showing Theopemptus and Theonas, from the Menologion of Basil II (c. 1000 AD)

Bishop and Martyr;
- Died: c. 303; Nicomedia (modern-day İzmit, Kocaeli, Turkey)
- Venerated in: Eastern Christianity, Catholic Church
- Feast: January 5 (Eastern Orthodox Church); January 3 (Catholic Church)

St. Theopemptus was the Bishop of Nicomedia and a Hieromartyr, under the rule of Diocletian. He is known for being one of the first victims of Diocletian's religious persecution. He is said to have refused to obey the emperor's order to worship an idol of Apollo. He was punished by being thrown into a fiery furnace, in a manner similar to the story of Shadrach, Meshach, and Abednego. But, by the power of God, he was kept alive. The emperor came and checked the furnace at night, and he saw Theopemptus alive and praying. Diocletian claimed the miracle was because of magic. He deprived Theopemptus of food and drink for twenty-two days, but, by another miracle of God, he was kept alive and healthy.

The emperor called upon the renowned sorcerer Theonas to overcome Theopemptus's 'mystical powers'. Theonas tried several times to poison Theopemptus, but each time the poison left him unharmed. Upon seeing that Theopemptus was still healthy, Theonas converted to Christianity, and was imprisoned together with Theopemptus, who proceeded to baptize and instruct him in the ways of Christ. Theopemptus changed Theonas's name to Synesios.

Diocletian tried again to convert Theopemptus to paganism. Upon seeing that he would not convert, the emperor tortured and beheaded him. Theonas, likewise, refused to worship idols and was buried alive in a deep ditch.
