= Gregory of Langres =

Gregory of Langres, also called Gregory of Autun, was a Gallo-Roman prelate, born around 446, count of Autun, in Saone-et-Loire then once widowed, towards 500, he becomes bishop of Langres, from 506 to his death in 539. Gregory is a Saint in the Eastern Orthodox Church, which celebrates his feast day on 4 January.

== Life ==
Descendant of a rich family of Senators, he was count and governor of Autun and Autunois. After the death of his uncle Attale, Count of Autun, he took over the county. History retains the memory of a man firm and severe, yet fair. He was ruthless to cowards and bandits, kind and gentle with good people. We know of two sons of his union with Armentaire (Armentaria), daughter of Armentarius, senator of Lyons. One is called Tetricus and will be his successor to the Episcopal See of Langres.

The second son, also named Gregory, will be the grandfather of the famous Gregory of Tours.

After the death of his wife, he joined the Church. The chronicler tells us that he was elected in 506 by the clergy and the faithful of Langres to the episcopal see. It is about this date that he founded the abbey Saint-Bénigne of Dijon and made place the relics of this apostle of Burgundy in the basilica. He sent for religious and gave them for abbot Eustade. He was an exemplary shepherd, indulging in abstinence with great rigor, eating only bread made with barley, using only water diluted with water and spending long hours in prayer. He lived "like an anchorite in the middle of the world", according to Gregory of Tours, his great-grandson.

He generally lived in Dijon, which at that time depended on the diocese of Langres. He lived near the baptistery of Saint Vincent, near the Saint-Etienne church. It was a place with many relics, where he came to pray at night. The legend tells us that one of the clerics watching him one day saw the revered saints coming to sing and glorify God with him. Saint Benigne let him know that he was quite grieved that his cult was neglected. Gregory immediately renewed the shrine of the martyr. He ordered the translation of the relics of Saint Benigne, and built the church and the abbey of Saint-Bénigne of Dijon which serve as their tomb.

It was in his day that Sigo, who would be canonized under the name of St. Seine, came to the Abbey of Reome, under the spiritual direction of Jean of Reome.
