= Syncletica of Alexandria =

4th century Christian saint from Roman Egypt

Saint Syncletica of Alexandria
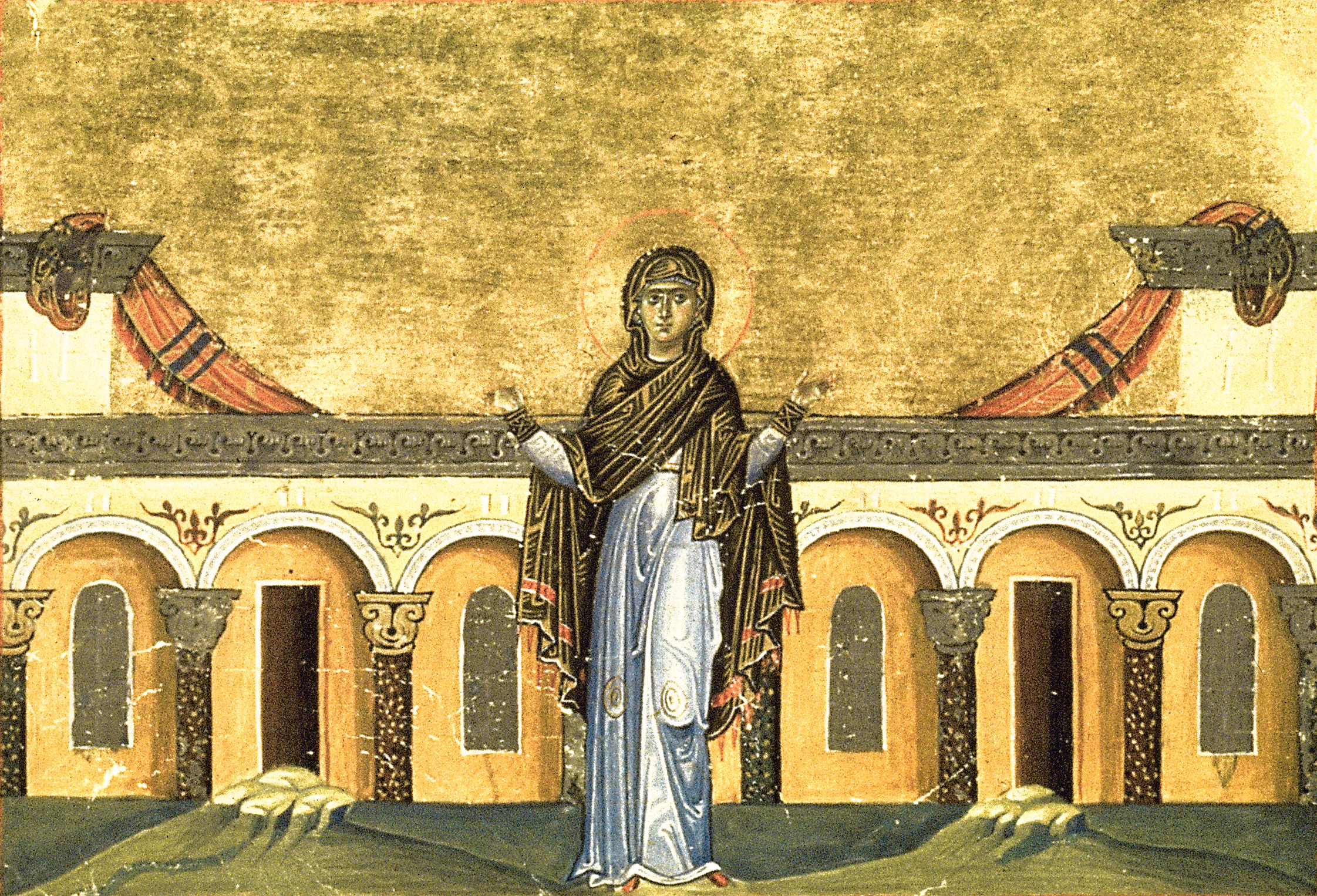
- Miniature depicting Syncletica of Alexandria, from the Menologion of Basil II (c. 1000 AD)

Nun, Desert Mother
- Born: c. 320
- Died: c. 400 (age 80 or 83 or 84); Roman Egypt
- Venerated in: Oriental Orthodox Churches; Eastern Orthodox Church; Catholic Church; Anglicanism
- Feast: 5 January; 6 January

Syncletica of Alexandria (Ancient Greek: Συγκλητική, romanized: Synkletikḗ) was a Christian saint, ascetic, anchorite, and Desert Mother from Roman Egypt in the 4th century AD (c. 320–400). She is the subject of The Life of Syncletica, a Greek hagiography purportedly by Athanasius of Alexandria (d. 373) but not published until 450; and the Alphabetical and Systematic Apophthegmata (probably compiled in the 6th century), which included 28 of her sayings and teachings. She died at the age of 80, after a three-year-long illness from mouth cancer.

Girls and young women, despite Syncletica's resistance, were drawn to her and to her teachings, and chose to live near her in the desert. Her teachings and sayings were full of Biblical quotes, allusions, and metaphors, especially about sailing, the sea, domestic chores, and female tasks. Unlike male ascetics of the time, domesticity for Syncletica was connected with spirituality and "richly capable of expressing the ascetic's spiritual growth". Her teachings "promote spiritual life as a dynamic, embodied reality and they do this in a way that unusually appropriates women's bodies and women's work as useful means by which one might think about and speak of spiritual life".

== Life ==
Syncletica, who lived during the 4th century, was born in Macedonia into a noble and wealthy family that might have been sailors, owners of a sailing business, and part of the Greco-Roman ruling class. She had a sister, who was blind, and two brothers who died early. The family moved to Alexandria and after her parents died, she cut her hair, gave away her fortune to the poor, and lived in a cell outside the city with her sister. She has been called "an upper-class girl who does not care about her body". Syncletica resolved to live openly as an ascetic, despite her parents' objections, cutting her hair as a symbol of her recognition that she was a new person. Sabine Baring-Gould agreed: "Being very beautiful and well-dowered, she was sought in marriage by many suitors; but declined all offers".

Hagiographer Sabine Baring-Gould states that Syncletica secretly gave away her wealth in the hopes she would receive no attention for it, but her reputation as an ascetic drew girls and young women to come to her for instruction. Although she made the choice to dedicate herself to the ascetic life during her childhood, cutting her hair "marked an important break with her mature female life and this elimination of an aspect of herself which had marked her out as an attractive partner who might marry and bear children was deliberate".

Syncletica died on 5 January, at the age of 80, 83 or 84 after a three-year long illness from mouth cancer. She refused treatment, even though the cancer had severely disfigured her face, but she eventually consented to it to prevent infecting her caregivers. There are no miracles attributed to Syncletica, not even posthumous ones. Her feast in the Roman Catholic Church is on 5 January; her feast in the Eastern Orthodox Church is 6 January.

== Legacy and teachings ==
Scholars Tim Vivian and William Veder both compare Syncletica to Anthony the Great, who also left his home, distributed his wealth to the poor, practiced voluntary poverty, and lived as an anchorite in the desert. Also like Anthony, her teachings attracted others, mostly virgins who came to visit her and perhaps lived nearby. Veder states that unlike most anchorites but like Anthony, she was most often called "holy", which made her as important as he was. She was also the only anchorite, other than Anthony, to have a vita, entitled the Life of Syncletica, written about her. Her vita was published sometime after c. 450, when the center of Christian monasticism switched from Egypt to Palestine, where it was probably written, perhaps by Athanasius of Alexandria, although there is speculation that it was written anonymously. The only personal and historical details about her life was in her vita, which does not include the dates of her birth and death and might have been "merely monastic instruction in hagiographic guise". There is also speculation that her name might have been fictitious. Vivian reports that her vita contains "hagiographic tropes of wealth, beauty, and piety"; he also considers the most important part of the vita is its report that she taught virgins who came to visit her and to live near her. Wheeler speculates that Syncletica had a diverse group of followers, from a wide variety of vocations and all stages of life.

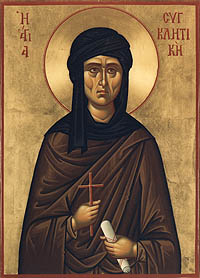
Icon of Syncletica

The legend of Apollinaris Syncletica (d. 450), another desert hermit, was probably based upon Syncletica and Theodora of Alexandria. Apollinaris Syncletica and Syncletica were connected in order to romanticize Syncletica's noble origins and to support her spiritual authority. According to scholar Fabrizio Petorella, she was also connected to Saint Thecla, an early follower of Saint Paul and one of the first Christian martyrs and virgins. Also according to Petorella, Syncletica's sufferings were harder than Thecla's sufferings, which related to the body, because Syncletica's sufferings involved the Late Antiquity's concept of asceticism, which implies daily self-inflicted pains and temptations, an interior martyrdom during a time when martyrdom no longer existed. Scholar Roberto Alciatti states that Syncletica and Thecla were compared to each other not only because they were both women and rejected marriage for the sake of chastity, but also "put up a double resistance, both bodily and spiritual, to the worldly way of life".

Another document about Syncletica exists, the Alphabetical and Systematic Apophthegmata (probably compiled in the 6th century), which included 28 of Syncletica's sayings and the sayings of two other desert mothers, Theodora of Alexandria and Sarah of the Desert. Syncletica's sayings were excerpts from the Life of Syncletica; Veder insists that this is evidence that her vita was written before the Apophthegmata. As Vivian states, her sayings are full of Biblical references: seven direct quotations and 50 allusions. They are also full of metaphors; her most common ones were nautical, a common image in early Christianity that she turns into a "parable for spiritual life". (Note: See Vivian (2019), pp. 6–14, for a description of Syncletica's nautical metaphors in her sayings.) In one case, Syncletica borrows a metaphor used by the apostle Paul in his first letter to the Corinthians, demonstrating her reliance of Scripture, her creative use and exegesis of it, and in this case, her connection of Scripture to nautical metaphors. She used Scripture extensively and also demonstrated her willingness to adapt it to her needs. In her vita, her use of nautical metaphors demonstrate "an intimate acquaintance with seafaring and fishing", occupations traditionally off limits to women. Scholar Rachel Wheeler states, however, that Syncletica's vita "expresses a sophisticated awareness of the importance of integrating physical and spiritual life in pursuit of purity of heart. This awareness manifests itself in Syncletica's use of metaphors drawn from everyday life experience and from specifically female life experience". Wheeler goes on to state that Syncletica's metaphors are drawn from the human body and from domestic chores. Unlike male ascetics of the time, domesticity for Syncletica was connected with spirituality and "richly capable of expressing the ascetic's spiritual growth".

According to Vivian, Syncletica's teachings about asceticism appears in her sayings and was summarized by her in this way: "This is the great ascetic practice: to remain steadfast and to offer up to God hymns of thanksgiving". Vivian states that Syncletica's metaphors also include apotropaic magic, fire, domestic activities such as cooking and washing clothes, fever and thirst, iron and rust, gold, a dilapidated house, the setting sun, athletes, going to jail, and putting on armor. She takes Biblical metaphors and extrapolates from them, drawing her students into her teachings by "offering her readers or listeners—including us—vivid word pictures for their imaginations, and souls". (Note: See Vivian (2019), pp. 18–23, for a description of Syncletica's use of non-nautical metaphors in her sayings and teachings.) Wheeler states that like other ascetic writers of the period, she praises poverty, virginity, fasting, and controlling one's thoughts, but unlike her contemporaries, she does not emphasize "the ascetic feats and radical breaks with convention" of her subjects. Instead, as Wheeler puts it, "Syncletica's teachings promote spiritual life as a dynamic, embodied reality and they do this in a way that unusually appropriates women's bodies and women's work as useful means by which one might think about and speak of spiritual life".

Syncletica also taught that spiritual maturity takes time and using the human body, she shows that spiritual growth occurs organically and at its own rate, much like how other biological processes grow and change. The repetition of women's work, which is necessarily repetitive and never-ending, "gave Syncletica scope for considering the integral relationship between her life's physical and spiritual dimensions". Her metaphors of household work are not related to paid handiwork, but her insistence on voluntary poverty allows her to express the worthlessness of money and the importance of ascetics to rely on God for their needs, and as a consequence, her vita and sayings do not reveal how she might have materially supported herself. For Syncletica, the female body was a useful tool for her expression of the dynamic nature between spiritual practice and life. She depended upon the self-knowledge of her followers, who were women, as the basis for understanding their spiritual growth. In her vita, her decision to cut her hair to identify herself as an ascetic and a virgin "signified the unadorned and pure nature of Syncletica's soul", which alerted her readers early in the text to its "thematic integration of bodily and spiritual matters".

Veder states that in both the vita of Syncletica and the Apophthegmata, the female is first subordinated, then displaced, and finally disappears. Wheeler disagrees, stating that "Syncletica's reality is always rooted in the [female] body". For example, prayer, like other ascetic activities, is embodied for Syncletica. Physical dimensions of prayer found in her vita include standing, crying, speaking, singing, and listening. Wheeler also states that the prevalence of imagery of women's bodies and of domesticity in her vita and sayings is best explained by her gender. The absence of domesticity in the writings and teachings of male ascetics and the emphasis of it in the works of desert mothers like Syncletica is due to "a differing perspective on life that women brought to their material circumstances". Syncletica used her own lived experience of her Christian faith to teaching other women and used domesticity because they were tasks familiar to her audience, something her hagiographer does not modify, which makes her vita unique. As Wheeler states, "Female experience was an appropriate model by which Syncletica and her companions might make sense of the spiritual life and its rigors".

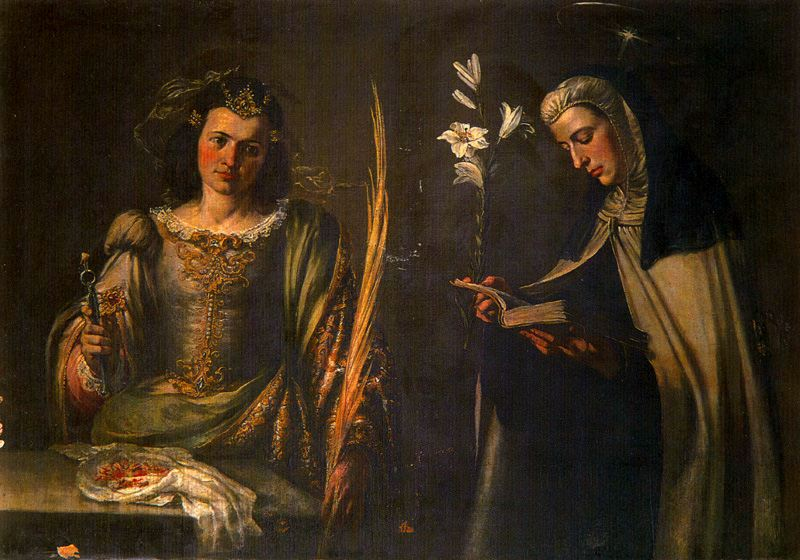
Santa Apolonia y Santa Sincletes (c. 1655) by Juan de Valdés Leal. Depicts Saint Apollonia (2nd century) and Saint Syncletica of Alexandria.

Wheeler states that like Syncletica's images of the human body, her imagery of women's work, which help her demonstrate her ideas about spiritual growth, "is an essential feature of her understanding of embodied spirituality" in her vita. Wheeler insists that no other late antiquity teacher uses imagery of domestic chores as creatively and consistently as Syncletica, who uses the imageries of housecleaning, security against home invasions, building a fire, and doing laundry as a basis for her teachings about spiritual life. One of Syncletica's most important metaphors for spiritual growth is the acting of house-cleaning, which parallel male ascetics' teachings about how house-building is similar to changing and improving the soul in one's body, although for Syncletica, house-cleaning and house-building collide, especially regarding fasting and how her body responded to it. Her vita reports that when she was forced to eat enough for nourishment, her body was weakened, but when she fasted, she was more healthy, upending the normal responses to depriving oneself of food. In the same way, her method of cleaning her soul is presented as different than the ways others did it. In her vita, she teaches her followers to remove everything unnecessary in their lives, including gossip and slander, and to keep their souls clean, as they did when they did house-cleaning or activities of self-care. Wheeler insists that one of Syncletica's most descriptive and memorable metaphors of domestic tasks is the act of doing laundry, which she uses to teach her followers about "the diversity of responses a disciple might have to the practice of poverty, and thus to all ascetic practices".

According to Wheeler, Syncletica's vita compares her suffering during her final illness to the suffering experienced by the Biblical figure Job, although it considers her suffering more severe than Job's because her struggles included both physical and spiritual distress. The vita's description of her illness is "graphically physical". Her lungs and vocal chords were afflicted first, then a single tooth and her gums, and finally her entire jaw, which decayed to the point that it blackened her mouth and caused "such a stench that her disciples could not bear to be near her". Eventually, she died of cancer and "consumption in the lungs" after a three-year long illness. According to Wheeler, the vita portrays Syncletica's illness and death graphically because it demonstrates the importance of "her identification with Christ through bodily pain, suffering, and death". The emphasis also encourages its readers to be more sensitive to how physical distress affects both the person experiencing it and the people around them. Syncletica's illness and death were compared to the events leading up to Christ's crucifixion; she, like Christ, was rejected by her followers. Finally, she agrees to medical treatment only after she sees that it would benefit them, which echoes Christ's submission to God. There is also an implication of Syncletica's role as a spiritual mother; her use of the imagery of feeding is "a theological association of Syncletica's body with Christ's in being 'given' for their disciples". Her wounds, like Christ's, nourished and healed her followers, which Wheeler considers an inversion of the feeding metaphor. Wheeler states that imagery of the female body in the vita centers on "functionally maternal body parts" like breasts and wombs, which are compared to "the nourishing qualities of Scripture and women's words and of creation in which material and spiritual life are jointly experienced". The culmination of the feeding and nourishing metaphor resides in the degradation of Syncletica's holy female body, which turns from something that repels her followers to something that nourishes them.

== Works cited ==
- Baring-Gould, Sabine (1897). The Lives of the Saints. Vol. 1. London: Ballantyne, Hanson, & Co. pp. 68–69.
- Petorella, Fabrizio (2019). "The True Disciple of the Blessed Thecla: Saint Syncletica and the Construction of Female Asceticism". Adamantius. 25: 418–426 – via EBSCO.
- Veder, William R. (2006). "Saint Syncletica and the Sea: A Text Come to Life". Russian History. 33 (2–4): 153–162. doi:10.1163/187633106X00096. JSTOR 24664437.
- Vivian, Tim (2019). "'We Sail by Day': Metaphor and Exegesis in the Sayings of Amma Syncletica of Egypt". Cistercian Studies Quarterly. 54 (1): 3–24 – via EBSCO.
- Vivian, Tim (2020). "Courageous Women: Three Desert Ammas—Theodora, Sarah, and Syncletica". American Benedictine Review. 71 (1): 75–107. ISSN 0002-7650 – via EBSCO.
- Wheeler, Rachel (Summer 2014). "Growing Wings like Eagles: Women's Bodies and Women's Work in the Life of Syncletica". Magistra. 20 (1): 76–96. ISSN 1079-7572 – via EBSCO.
