= Zosimus the Hermit =

Saint Zosimus
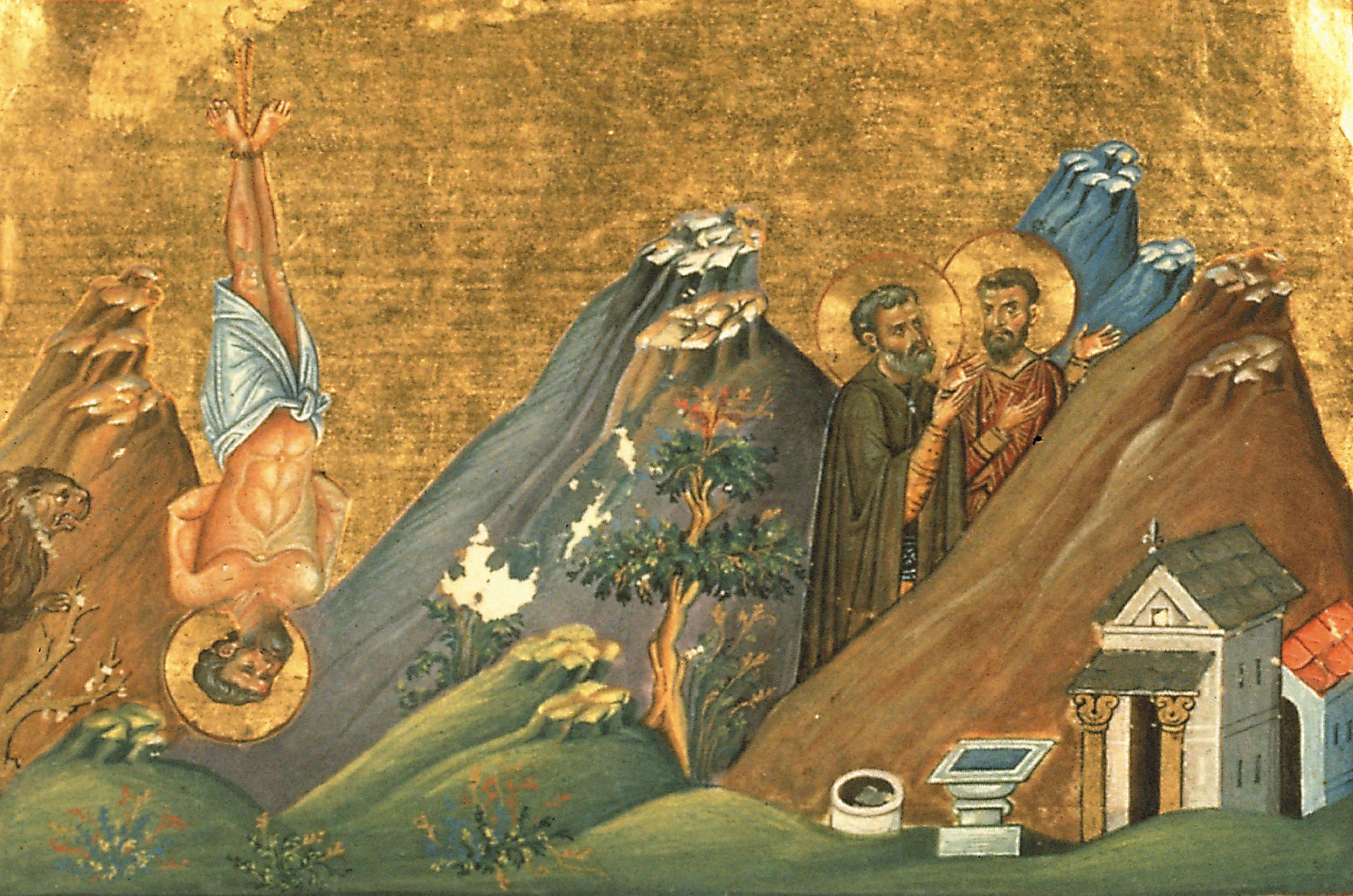

Confessor of the Faith, Hermit
- Venerated in: Catholic Church; Eastern Orthodox Church
- Canonized: Pre-Congregation
- Feast: 3 January (Roman Catholic Church); 4 January (Eastern Orthodox Church, Byzantine Catholic Churches)

Zosimus the Hermit was an ascetic who resided in the wilds of Cilicia and Palestine in the 3rd century AD.

Zosimus was tortured during the Diocletianic Persecution of the Church under Roman emperor Diocletian but persevered in his Christian faith. After being tortured, he was left miraculously unharmed, which led to the conversion of Zosimus' guard Athanasius, who accepted the Christianity and baptism. Eventually, both Zosimus and Athanasius were released.

Legendary accounts relate Zosimus traveled by camel, and later by wind, to a place called the "Abode of the Blessed". The Abode was either a "paradisiacal realm" or a mountain hermitage far from human society. When he arrived, he saw a wall of clouds which he was lifted across by two trees. At the abode, he found a group of Rechabites. Zosimus lived there for forty years. While there, he abstained from wine, bread, and social interactions. Afterwards, he left to spread the Rechabite teachings. In order to stop him, the Devil and several demons tortured him for forty days. However, Zosimus banished the demons and lived on. During Zosimus's life, he would meet a penitent at the Jordan River. It is commonly accepted that much of the story surrounding Zosimus is fantasy.

Saint Zosimus the Hermit and Saint Athanasius his disciple are commemorated on 4 January by the Eastern Orthodox and Byzantine Catholic Churches, while the Catholic Church commemorates them a day earlier on 3 January.

== See also ==
- Story of Zosimus
