= Theodora of Alexandria =

Egyptian Eastern Orthodox saint

Saint Theodora of Alexandria
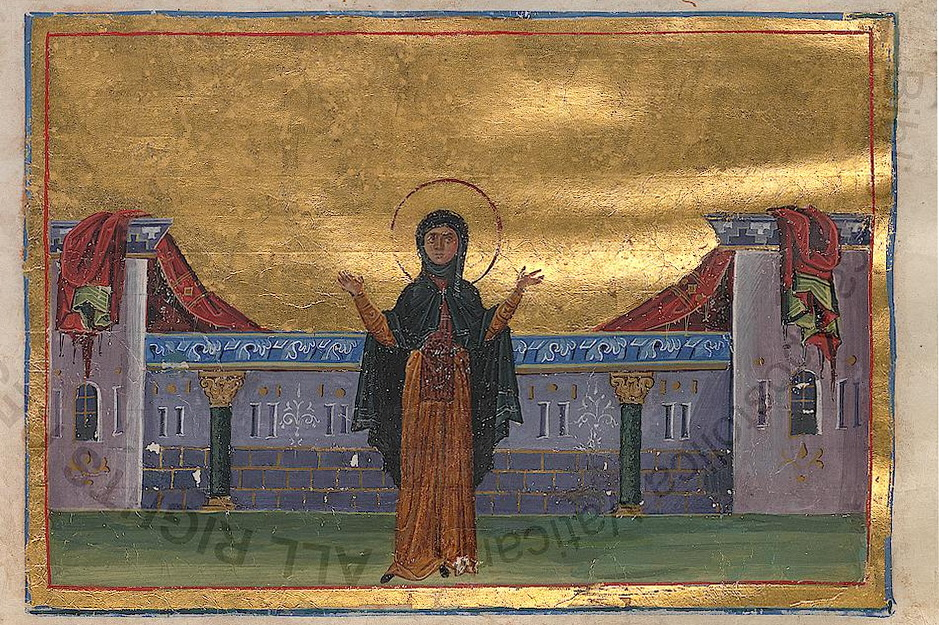
- Miniature of Saint Theodora in the Menologion of Basil II (11c.)

Desert Mother
- Born: c. 5th century AD; Alexandria, Egypt
- Died: c. 490; Thebaid, Egypt
- Venerated in: Roman Catholic Church, Eastern Orthodox Church, Oriental Orthodox Church, Anglican Church
- Feast: 11 September

Theodora of Alexandria (Greek: Θεοδώρα Άλεξανδρείας) an Egyptian saint and martyr who lived during the 5th century in Alexandria, during the reign of Emperor Zeno. Hagiographer Sabine Baring-Gould states that Theodora's story might have been embellished and that her biography was probably pieced together from the lives of other saints, such as Marina the Monk, another 5th-century Byzantine saint who also lived as a male among monks, was accused of the same things as Theodora, and was vindicated after her death.

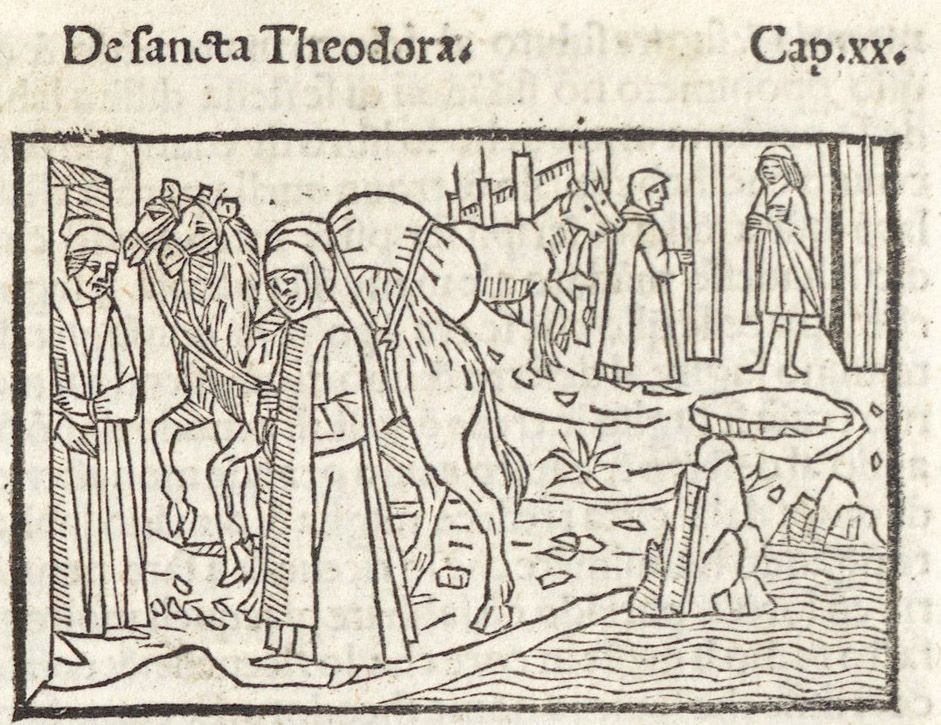
Theodora of Alexandria in the Golden Legend (1497)

== Self-imposed penance for adultery, and disguise as a eunuch ==
According to one source, Theodora was "adorned with physical beauty and was devoted to her pious husband", but made the mistake of betraying him. According to legend, her husband was Gregory (or Paphnutius), prefect of Egypt and "a devout and respectable man", whom she left "out of remorse for the adultery that she committed with another man" and "to do penance for a sin she had committed", so that her husband would not find her. She clothed herself as a male, called herself "Theodore", and disguising herself as a eunuch, lived for the rest of her life as a monk at a monastery in the Thebaid. She practiced ascetism, did menial tasks, and prayed fervently to be forgiven by God and be restored to chastity. According to Baring-Gould, Theodora was "sent with some camels to Alexandria" to Gregory, who recognized her as his wife. She insisted upon returning, though, and lived as a hermit and ascetic for the rest of her life.

== Accused of fathering an illegitimate child ==
After two years, someone accused Theodora of fathering a child with a woman from a nearby village; instead of defending herself and revealing her identity, she accepted being expelled from the monastery for seven years and in "extreme poverty", raised the child as her own. She continued her asceticism and continued to raise the child until she died. Her identity as a woman was not discovered and the slander against was not revealed until after her death. She sent for her husband when she realized that she was dying, but he did not arrive until after her death; her husband attended her funeral, distributed his possessions to the poor, and moved into the monastery.

== Depiction in print ==
A rare image of Theodora in Western art is a print by Bernardino Capitelli, made in 1627 for Theodora Costa dal Pozzo, showing the saint disguised as a monk and caring for the child she was accused of fathering (Vienna: Graphische Sammlung Albertina).

== Feast ==
Theodora isn't honored with a Lesser Feast (with Sarah of the Desert and Syncletica of Alexandria) on the liturgical calendar of the Episcopal Church in the United States of America on 5 January, the Amma Theodora honored this day is a namesake, which retired in the desert to live an ascetic life after the death of her husband.

Theodora is honored on 11 September in the Greek Orthodox Archdiocese of America.

== Source ==
- de Voragine, Jacobus (1275). Ellis, F. S. (ed.). The Golden Legend or Lives of the Saints. Vol. 4. Translated by Caxton, William. Temple Classics.

== Works cited ==
- Baring-Gould, Sabine (1898). The Lives of the Saints. Vol. 10. J. C. Nimmo. pp. 172–173.
