= Hermit =

Person who lives in seclusion from society

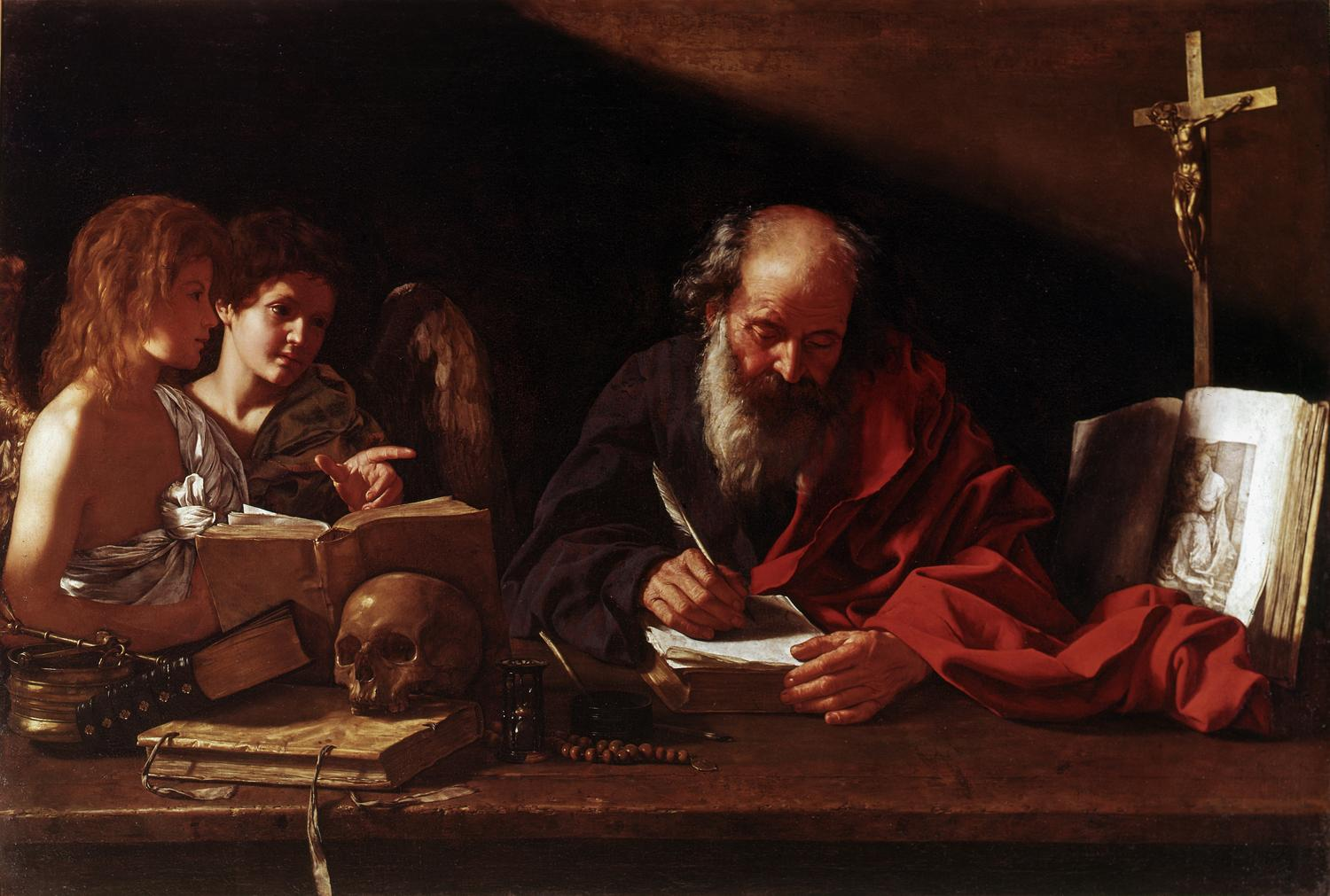
Saint Jerome, who lived as a hermit near Bethlehem, depicted in his study being visited by two angels (by Cavarozzi, early 17th century)

A hermit, also known as an eremite (adjectival form: hermitic or eremitic) or solitary, is a person who lives in seclusion. Eremitism plays a role in a variety of religions.

== Description ==
The term was originally applied to a Christian who lives the eremitic life in solitude, namely Christian Desert Theology (i.e., the 40 days that Jesus Christ fasted in the desert).

In the Christian tradition the eremitic life is an early form of monastic living that preceded the monastic life in the cenobium. In chapter 1, the Rule of St Benedict lists hermits among four kinds of monks. In the Roman Catholic Church, in addition to hermits who are members of religious institutes, the Canon law (canon 603) recognizes also diocesan hermits under the direction of their bishop as members of the consecrated life. The same is true in the Evangelical-Lutheran churches, as well as many parts of the Anglican Communion, including the Episcopal Church in the United States, although in the canon law of the Episcopal Church they are referred to as "solitaries" rather than "hermits". Certain monastic institutes, such as the Sisters of the Holy Spirit at Alsike Convent, allow Christians to commit a certain period of time (such as the summer period) to living as a hermit in a hermitage.

Often, both in religious and secular literature, the term "hermit" is used loosely for any Christian living a secluded prayer-focused life, and sometimes interchangeably with anchorite/anchoress, recluse, and "solitary". Other religions, including Buddhism, Hinduism, Islam (Sufism), and Taoism, afford examples of hermits in the form of adherents living an ascetic way of life.

In modern colloquial usage, "hermit" denotes anyone living apart from the rest of society, or having entirely or in part withdrawn from society, for any reason.

== Etymology ==
The word hermit comes from the Latin ĕrēmīta, the latinisation of the Greek ἐρημίτης (erēmitēs), "of the desert", which in turn comes from ἔρημος (erēmos), signifying "desert", "uninhabited", hence "desert-dweller"; adjective: "eremitic".

== History ==
=== Tradition ===
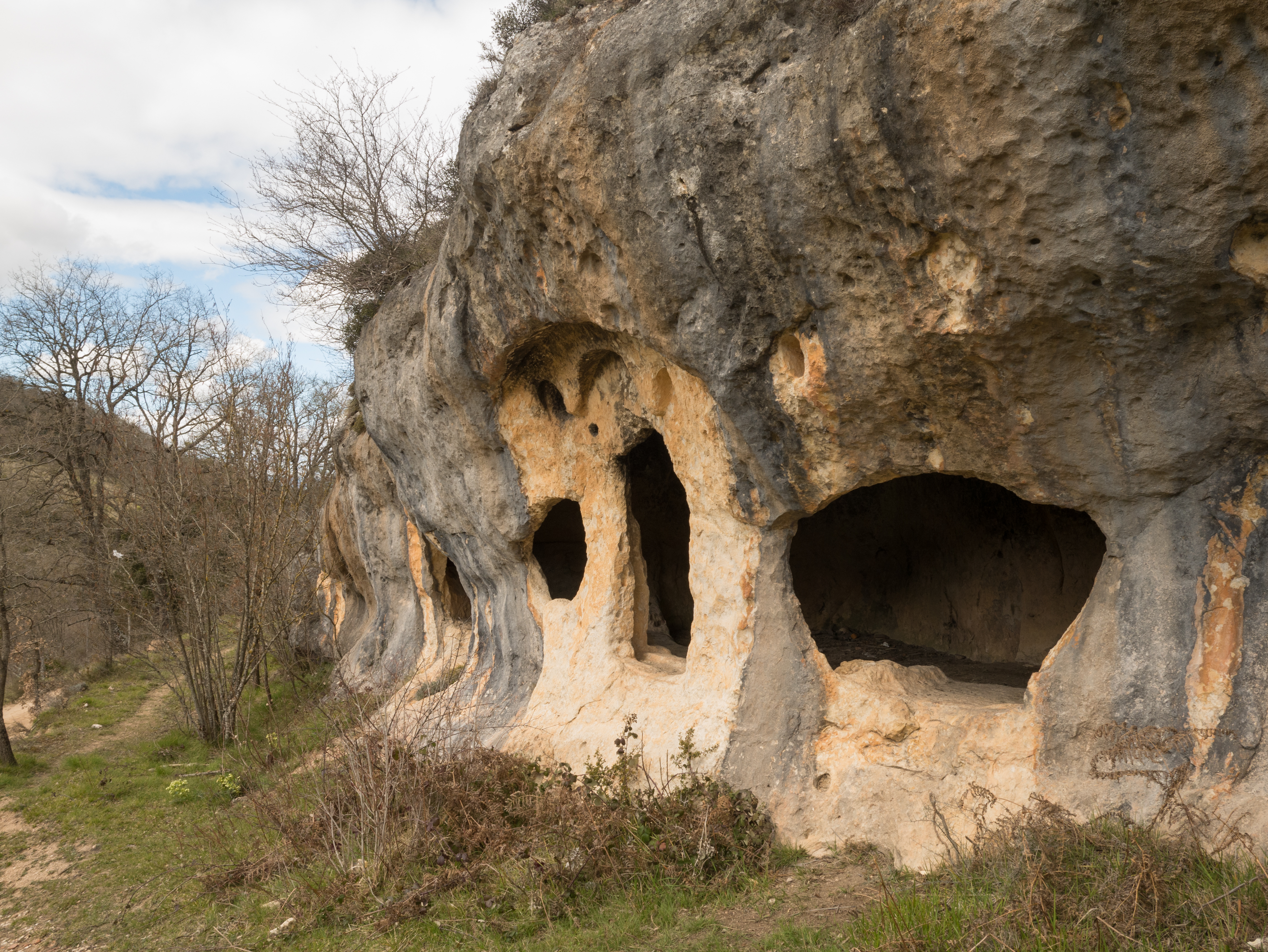
Eremitic cave in Spain

In the common Christian tradition the first known Christian hermit in Egypt was Paul of Thebes (fl. 3rd century), hence also called "St. Paul the first hermit". Antony of Egypt (fl. 4th century), often referred to as "Antony the Great", is perhaps the most renowned of all the early Christian hermits owing to the biography by Athanasius of Alexandria. An antecedent for Egyptian eremiticism may have been the Syrian solitary or "son of the covenant" (Aramaic bar qəyāmā) who undertook special disciplines as a Christian.

Christian hermits in the past have often lived in isolated cells or hermitages, whether a natural cave or a constructed dwelling, situated in the desert or the forest. People sometimes sought them out for spiritual advice and counsel. Some eventually acquired so many disciples that they no longer enjoyed physical solitude. Some early Christian Desert Fathers wove baskets to exchange for bread.

In medieval times, hermits were also found within or near cities where they might earn a living as gate keepers or ferrymen. In the 10th century, a rule for hermits living in a monastic community was written by Grimlaicus. In the 11th century, the life of the hermit gained recognition as a legitimate independent pathway to salvation. Many hermits in that century and the next came to be regarded as saints. From the Middle Ages and down to modern times, eremitic monasticism has also been practiced within the context of religious institutes in the Christian West.

In the Catholic Church, the Carthusians and Camaldolese arrange their monasteries as clusters of hermitages where the monks live most of their day and most of their lives in solitary prayer and work, gathering only briefly for communal prayer and only occasionally for community meals and recreation. The Cistercian, Trappist, and Carmelite orders, which are essentially communal in nature, allow members who feel a calling to the eremitic life, after years living in the cenobium or community of the monastery, to move to a cell suitable as a hermitage on monastery grounds. There have also been many hermits who chose that vocation as an alternative to other forms of monastic life.

=== Anchorites ===
The term "anchorite" (from the Greek ἀναχωρέω anachōreō, signifying "to withdraw", "to depart into the country outside the circumvallate city") is often used as a synonym for hermit, not only in the earliest written sources but throughout the centuries. Yet the anchoritic life, while similar to the eremitic life, can also be distinct from it. Anchorites lived the religious life in the solitude of an "anchorhold" (or "anchorage"), usually a small hut or "cell", typically built against a church. The door of an anchorage tended to be bricked up in a special ceremony conducted by the local bishop after the anchorite had moved in. Medieval churches survive that have a tiny window ("squint") built into the shared wall near the sanctuary to allow the anchorite to participate in the liturgy by listening to the service and to receive Holy Communion. Another window looked out into the street or cemetery, enabling charitable neighbors to deliver food and other necessities. Clients seeking the anchorite's advice might also use this window to consult them.

== Contemporary Christian life ==
=== Catholicism ===
Catholics who wish to live in eremitic monasticism may live that vocation as a hermit:

- in an eremitic order, for example Carthusian or Camaldolese (in the latter one affiliate oblates may also live as hermits)
- as a diocesan hermit under the canonical direction of their bishop (canon 603, see below)

There are also lay people who informally follow an eremitic lifestyle and live mostly as solitaries. Not all the Catholic lay members that feel that it is their vocation to dedicate themselves to God in a prayerful solitary life perceive it as a vocation to some form of consecrated life. An example of this is life as a Poustinik, an Eastern Catholic expression of eremitic living that is finding adherents also in the West.

==== Eremitic members of religious institutes ====
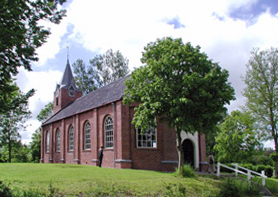
Church of the hermitage Our Lady of the Enclosed Garden in Warfhuizen, Netherlands

In the Catholic Church, the institutes of consecrated life have their own regulations concerning those of their members who feel called by God to move from the life in community to the eremitic life, and have the permission of their religious superior to do so. The Code of Canon Law contains no special provisions for them. They technically remain a member of their institute of consecrated life and thus under obedience to their religious superior.

The Carthusian and Camaldolese orders of monks and nuns preserve their original way of life as essentially eremitic within a cenobitical context, that is, the monasteries of these orders are in fact clusters of individual hermitages where monks and nuns spend their days alone with relatively short periods of prayer in common.

Other orders that are essentially cenobitical, notably the Trappists, maintain a tradition under which individual monks or nuns who have reached a certain level of maturity within the community may pursue a hermit lifestyle on monastery grounds under the supervision of the abbot or abbess. Thomas Merton was among the Trappists who undertook this way of life.

==== Diocesan hermits ====
The earliest form of Christian eremitic or anchoritic living preceded that of being a member of a religious institute, since monastic communities and religious institutes are later developments of the monastic life. Bearing in mind that the meaning of the eremitic vocation is Christian Desert Theology, it may be said that the desert of the urban hermit is that of their heart, purged through kenosis to be the dwelling place of God alone.

So as to provide for men and women who feel a vocation to the eremitic or anchoritic life without being or becoming a member of an institute of consecrated life, but desire its recognition by the Roman Catholic Church as a form of consecrated life nonetheless, the 1983 Code of Canon Law legislates in the Section on Consecrated Life (canon 603) as follows:

§1 Besides institutes of consecrated life the church recognizes the eremitic or anchoritic life by which the Christian faithful devote their life to the praise of God and salvation of the world through a stricter separation from the world, the silence of solitude, and assiduous prayer and penance.
§2 A hermit is recognized by law as one dedicated to God in consecrated life if he or she publicly professes in the hands of the diocesan bishop the three evangelical counsels, confirmed by vow or other sacred bond, and observes a proper program of living under his direction.

Canon 603 §2 lays down the requirements for diocesan hermits.

The Catechism of the Catholic Church of 11 October 1992 (§§918–921), comments on the eremitic life as follows:

From the very beginning of the Church there were men and women who set out to follow Christ with greater liberty, and to imitate him more closely, by practicing the evangelical counsels. They led lives dedicated to God, each in his own way. Many of them, under the inspiration of the Holy Spirit, became hermits or founded religious families. These the Church, by virtue of her authority, gladly accepted and approved.

...

Hermits devote their life to the praise of God and salvation of the world through a stricter separation from the world, the silence of solitude, and assiduous prayer and penance. (Footnote: CIC, can. 603 §1) They manifest to everyone the interior aspect of the mystery of the Church, that is, personal intimacy with Christ. Hidden from the eyes of men, the life of the hermit is a silent preaching of the Lord, to whom he has surrendered his life simply because he is everything to him. Here is a particular call to find in the desert, in the thick of spiritual battle, the glory of the Crucified One.

Catholic Church norms for the consecrated eremitic and anchoritic life do not include corporal works of mercy. Nevertheless, every hermit, like every Christian, is bound by the law of charity and therefore ought to respond generously, as their own circumstances permit, when faced with a specific need for corporal works of mercy. Hermits are also bound by the law of work. If they are not financially independent, they may engage in cottage industries or be employed part-time in jobs that respect the call for them to live in solitude and silence with extremely limited or no contact with other persons. Such outside jobs may not keep them from observing their obligations of the eremitic vocation of stricter separation from the world and the silence of solitude in accordance with canon 603, under which they have made their vow. Although canon 603 makes no provision for associations of hermits, these do exist (for example the Hermits of Bethlehem in Chester, NJ, and the Hermits of Saint Bruno in the United States; see also lavra, skete).

=== Lutheranism ===
The Lutheran churches have had a tradition of hermits. In the United States, the Lutheran hermit Arthur Carl Kreinheder, was lauded for his efforts for ecumenism.

=== Anglicanism ===
Many of the recognised religious communities and orders in the Anglican Communion make provision for certain members to live as hermits, more commonly referred to as solitaries. One Church of England community, the Society of St. John the Evangelist, now has only solitaries in its British congregation. Anglicanism also makes provision for men and women who seek to live a single consecrated life, after taking vows before their local bishop; many who do so live as solitaries. The Handbook of Religious Life, published by the Advisory Council of Relations between Bishops and Religious Communities, contains an appendix governing the selection, consecration, and management of solitaries living outside recognised religious communities.

In the Canon Law of the Episcopal Church (United States), those who make application to their diocesan bishop and who persevere in whatever preparatory program the bishop requires, take vows that include lifelong celibacy. They are referred to as solitaries rather than hermits. Each selects a bishop other than their diocesan as an additional spiritual resource and, if necessary, an intermediary. At the start of the twenty-first century, the Church of England reported a notable increase in the number of applications from people seeking to live the single consecrated life as Anglican hermits or solitaries. A religious community known as the Solitaries of DeKoven, who make Anglican prayer beads and Pater Noster cords to support themselves, are an example of an Anglican hermitage.

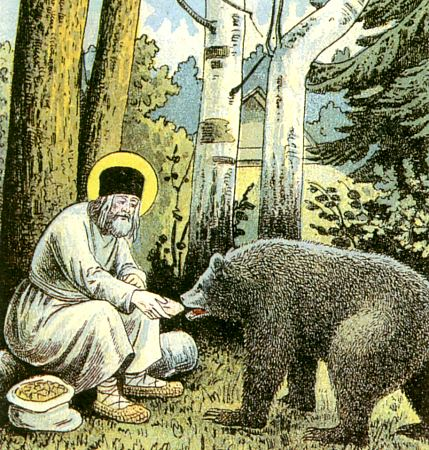
St. Seraphim of Sarov sharing his meal with a bear

=== Eastern Orthodoxy ===
In the Eastern Orthodox Church (as with the Eastern Lutheran churches and Eastern Rite Catholic Churches), hermits live a life of prayer as well as service to their community in the traditional Eastern Christian manner of the poustinik. The poustinik is a hermit available to all in need and at all times. In the Eastern Christian churches, one traditional variation of the Christian eremitic life is the semi-eremitic life in a lavra or skete, exemplified historically in Scetes, a place in the Egyptian desert, and continued in various sketes today, including several regions on Mount Athos.

== Notable Christian hermits ==
=== Early and Medieval Church ===
- Paul of Thebes, 4th century, Egypt, regarded by St. Jerome as the first hermit
- Abba Or of Nitria, 4th century, Egypt.
- Anthony of Egypt, 4th century, Egypt, a Desert Father, regarded as the founder of Christian Monasticism
- Macarius of Egypt, 4th century, founder of the Monastery of Saint Macarius the Great, presumed author of "Spiritual Homilies"
- St. Jerome, 4th century, Mediterranean region, Doctor of the Church, considered the spiritual father of the Hieronymite eremitic order
- Syncletica of Alexandria, 4th century, Egypt, one of the early Desert Mothers, her maxims are included in the sayings of the Desert Fathers
- Gregory the Illuminator, 4th century, brought the Christian faith to Armenia
- Mary of Egypt, 4th/5th century, Egypt and Transjordan, penitent
- Simeon Stylites, 4th/5th century, Syria, pillar saint
- Sarah of the Desert, 5th century, Egypt, one of the Desert Mothers, her maxims are recorded in the sayings of the Desert Fathers
- St Benedict of Nursia, 6th century, Italy, author of the so-called Rule of St Benedict, regarded as the founder of western monasticism
- Kevin of Glendalough, 6th Century, Ireland
- St. Gall, 7th century, Switzerland, namesake of the city and canton of St. Gallen.
- Herbert of Derwentwater, 7th century, England.
- Saint John of Rila, 9th–10th century, first Bulgarian hermit.
- St. Romuald, 10th/11th century, Italy, founder of the Camaldolese order
- Guðríðr Þorbjarnardóttir, 10th/11th century, Iceland.
- Bruno of Cologne, 11th century, France, the founder of the Carthusian order
- Peter the Hermit, 11th century, France, leader of the People's Crusade
- Blessed Eusebius of Esztergom, 13th century, Hungary, the founder of the Order of Saint Paul the First Hermit
- Bl. Gonçalo de Amarante, 13th century, Portugal, Dominican friar
- Richard Rolle de Hampole, 13th century, England, religious writer
- Sergius of Radonezh, 14th century
- Nicholas of Flüe, 15th century, patron saint of Switzerland
- Julian of Norwich, 15th century, England, anchoress
- St. Juan Diego, 1474–1548, Mexico, visionary of the apparition of Our Lady of Guadalupe

=== Modern times ===
Members of religious orders:

- Herman of Alaska, 18th century
- Seraphim of Sarov, 18th/19th century
- Thomas Merton, 20th-century Trappist monk, spiritual writer

Diocesan hermits according to canon 603:

- Sr Scholastica Egan, writer on the eremitic vocation
- Sr Laurel M O'Neal, Er Dio, spiritual director, writer on eremitic life
- Hermits of Bethlehem, Chester, NJ (modern lavra)
- Fr Martin Suhartono, Er Dio, formerly Jesuit

Others:

- Masafumi Nagasaki, Japan's "naked hermit," lived on the island of Sotobanari until he became ill and was forced to leave the island by the government.
- Jeanne Le Ber, 17th/18th-century Canadian Catholic recluse, inspired the founding of the Recluse Sisters
- Wendy Beckett, formerly of the Sisters of Notre Dame de Namur, was also a consecrated virgin, lived in monastic solitude
- Catherine Doherty, poustinik, foundress of the Madonna House Apostolate
- Charles de Foucauld, 19th/20th century, formerly Trappist monk, inspired the founding of the Little Brothers of Jesus
- Jan Tyranowski, spiritual mentor to the young Karol Wojtyla, who would eventually become Pope John Paul II

Communities:

- Order of Watchers, a contemporary French Protestant eremitic fraternity
- Hermits of the Most Blessed Virgin Mary of Mount Carmel
- Monastic Family of Bethlehem, of the Assumption of the Virgin and of Saint Bruno

== Other religions ==
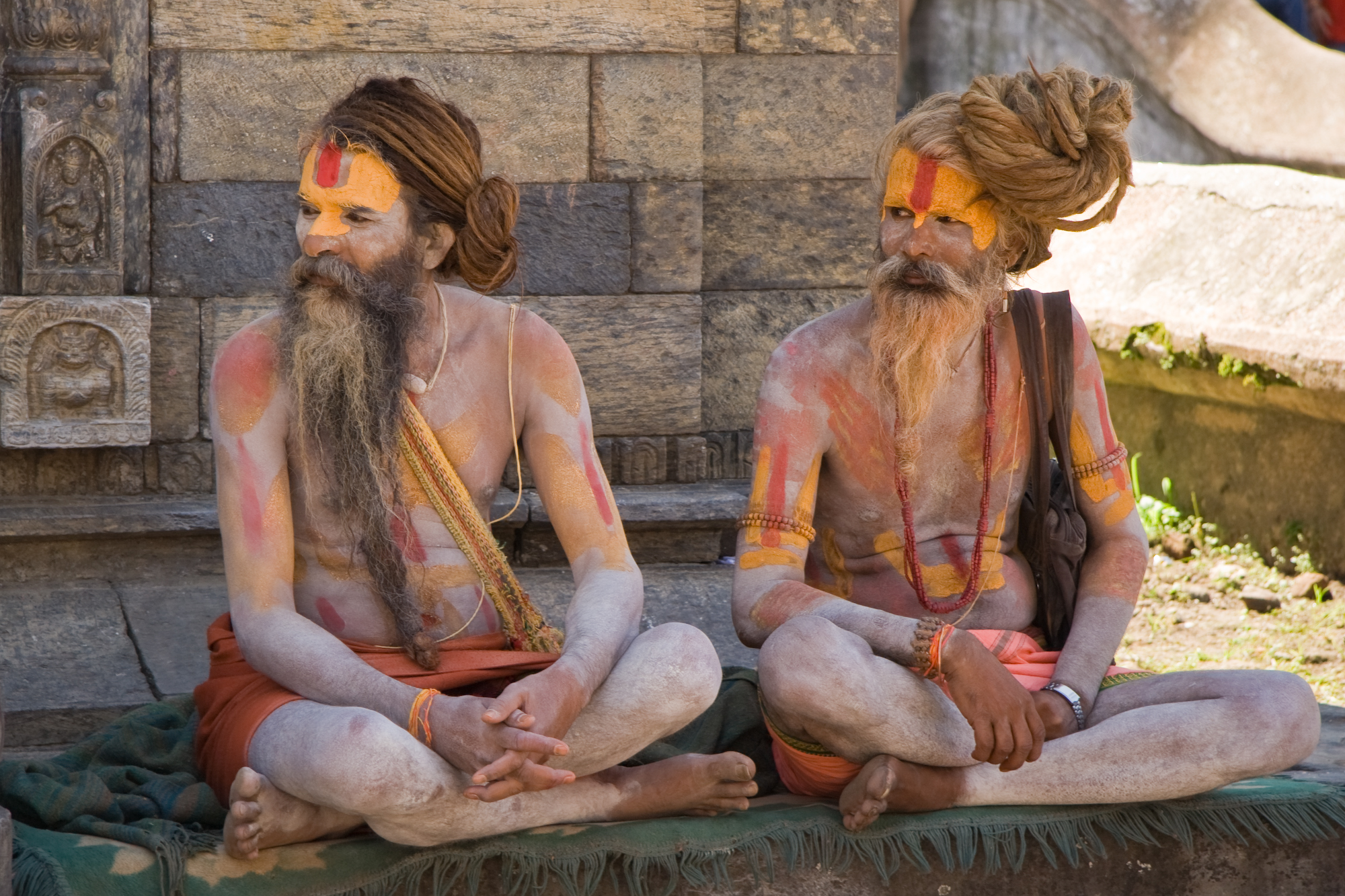
Two Sadhus, Hindu hermits in public

From a religious point of view, the solitary life is a form of asceticism, wherein the hermit renounces worldly concerns and pleasures. This can be done for many reasons, including: to come closer to the deity or deities they worship or revere, to devote one's energies to self-liberation from saṃsāra, etc. This practice appears also in ancient Śramaṇa traditions, Buddhism, Jainism, Hinduism, Kejawèn, and Sufism. Taoism also has a long history of ascetic and eremitic figures. In the ascetic eremitic life, the hermit seeks solitude for meditation, contemplation, prayer, self-awareness, and personal development on physical and mental levels, without the distractions of contact with human society, sex, or the need to maintain socially acceptable standards of cleanliness, dress, or communication. The ascetic discipline can also include a simplified diet and/or manual labor as a means of support.

=== Judaism ===
- The Baal Shem Tov, founder of Hasidism, lived for many years as a hermit in the Carpathian Mountains.
- Rabbi Yosef Yozel Horowitz, known as the "Alter (Elder) of Novardok", succeeded his master Rabbi Yisrael Salanter in disseminating the pietistic teachings of the Lithuanian Mussar Movement. He too spent much time in seclusion, including one year during which he confined himself to a sealed room, attended by a few devoted followers.

=== Buddhism ===
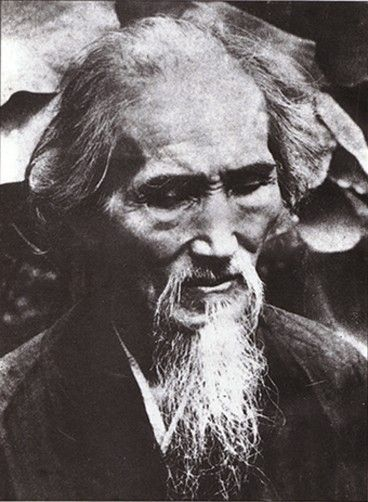
Hsu Yun, a renowned Chan Buddhist hermit

- U Khandi, religious figure in Burma who lived as a hermit and meditated at the Mandalay Thakho hill and Shwe-myin-tin hill.
- Ajahn Mun Bhuridatta Thera, who is credited for establishing the Thai Forest Tradition, spent his monastic life wandering through Thailand, Burma, and Laos, dwelling for the most part in the forest, engaged in the practice of meditation.
- Luang Pu Waen Suciṇṇo, highly respected monk of Thai Forest Tradition, who lived alone, practiced alone in forests, and preferred seclusion.
- Nyanatiloka Mahathera, one of the earliest western Buddhist monks and founder of Island Hermitage.
- Ajahn Jayasāro, notable disciple of Ajahn Chah, living alone in Janamāra Hermitage.
- Yoshida Kenkō, Japanese author and Buddhist monk.
- Hsu Yun, renowned Ch'an Buddhist monk in modern China era.
- Hanshan, Buddhist/Taoist hermit and poet.

=== Taoism ===
- Laozi, the semi-legendary author of the Tao Te Ching and founder of philosophical Taoism, who is known in some traditions as having been a hermit.
- Zhang Daoling, founder of Tianshi Dao, retired and led a reclusive life at Mount Beimang, where he practiced Taoist methods to attain longevity.

=== Other notable hermits ===
- Wang Fu, a Han dynasty recluse left society because of the eunuchs around the Three Kingdoms period in history. He was a Confucian who wrote Qianfu Lun.
- Jiang Ziya supposedly lived in seclusion after King Zhou ignored him. He was a general who butchered cows in the street and fished with unique hooks or none at all. King Wen of Zhou found him, and in some traditions wrote the six secret teachings.
- Yi Yin severed King Jie of the Xia dynasty. He was ignored by society, planted fields, and loved to watch them grow. King Tang came and helped found the Shang dynasty. Some say that he was a cook, which was how he won King Tang over, but Mencius rejected this.
- Lin Bu, a Song dynasty poet who spent much of his later life in solitude, while admiring plum blossoms at a cottage on Gushan Island in West Lake, then outside Hangzhou.
- Ramana Maharshi, the renowned Hindu philosopher and saint who meditated for several years at and around the hillside temple of Thiruvannamalai in Southern India.
- Ta Eisey, the archetype of the hermit in Khmer civilization

== In literature ==
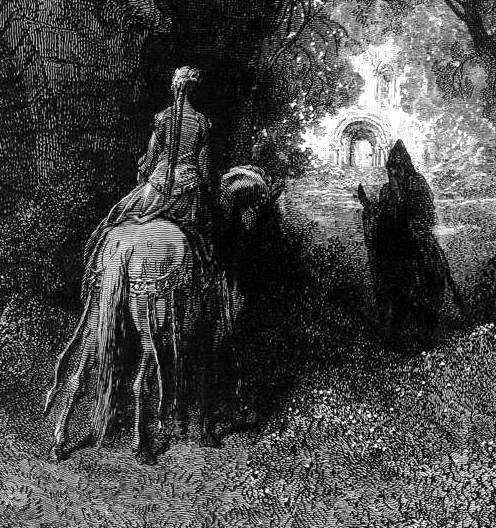
In Orlando Furioso, Angelica meets a hermit

- In medieval romances, the knight-errant frequently encounters hermits on his quest. Such a figure, generally a wise old man, would advise him. Knights searching for the Holy Grail, in particular, learn from a hermit the errors they must repent for, and the significance of their encounters, dreams, and visions. Evil wizards would sometimes pose as hermits, to explain their presence in the wilds, and to lure heroes into a false sense of security. In Edmund Spenser's The Faerie Queene, both occurred: the knight on a quest met a good hermit, and the sorcerer Archimago took on such a pose. These hermits are sometimes also vegetarians for ascetic reasons, as suggested in a passage from Sir Thomas Malory's Le Morte d'Arthur: "Then departed Gawain and Ector as heavy (sad) as they might for their misadventure (mishap), and so rode till that they came to the rough mountain, and there they tied their horses and went on foot to the hermitage. And when they were (had) come up, they saw a poor house, and beside the chapel a little courtelage (courtyard), where Nacien the hermit gathered worts (vegetables), as he had tasted none other meat (food) of a great while." The practice of vegetarianism may have also existed amongst actual medieval hermits outside of literature.
- Hermits appear in a few of the stories of Giovanni Boccaccio's The Decameron. One of the most famous stories, the tenth story of the third day, involves the seduction of a young girl by a hermit in the desert near Gafsa; it was judged to be so obscene that it was not translated into English until the 20th century.
- The Three Hermits is a famous short story by Russian author Leo Tolstoy written in 1885 and first published in 1886, with its shock ending, featured the 3 hermits as the titular characters. The main character of Tolstoy's short story "Father Sergius" is a Russian nobleman who turns to a solitary religious life and becomes a hermit after he learns that his fiancée was a discarded mistress of the czar.
- Friedrich Nietzsche, in his influential work, Thus Spoke Zarathustra, created the character of the hermit Zarathustra (named after the Zoroastrian prophet Zarathushtra), who emerges from seclusion to extol his philosophy to the rest of humanity.

== In media ==
- The 2022 BBC documentary The Hermit of Treig follows Ken Smith, who has been a hermit for 40 years

== See also ==
- Dhutanga
- Enclosed religious orders
- Garden hermit
