= Or of Nitria =

Christian monk and saint from 4th-century Egypt

Saint Or of Nitria

Abba
- Born: Early 4th century The Thebaid, Egypt
- Residence: Nitria
- Died: c. 390, over 90 years old Egypt
- Venerated in: Oriental Orthodox Church; Eastern Orthodox Church; Roman Catholic Church
- Feast: August 7
- Attributes: Love, Generosity, Kindness, Abstinence, Wisdom
- Influenced: Sisoes the Great, Theodore of Enaton, Abba Pistos

Abba Or of Nitria, also called Hor or Horus, was a Christian ascetic in Egypt who lived around the 4th century AD in Dalga, Nitria (Lower Egypt), the Thebaid, and in the deserts around Shaina. He is one of the lesser-known Desert Fathers, but is nevertheless regarded as one of the "chief among monks", being "a man who stood out among many of the fathers". He is associated with Theodore and Sisoes the Great. According to Jerome, at one point during his life, Or was the father of "one thousand [cenobitic] monks" in the Egyptian Desert. Or died c. 390.

== Life ==
=== Desert reclusion ===
Or's early life remains unknown. He was likely born in the late 3rd or early 4th century.

Most of his recorded life comes from Jerome's account of him in the History of the Monks of Egypt. Or was known for his extreme love for mankind, his hospitality, and his humility. He lived for the majority of his life in austere asceticism as a solitary hermit in the deserts of Dalga. The Vitae Patrum says, "He had lived at first in a remote part of the desert, practicing many works of abstinence, before founding a monastery not far from the city." Jerome says, "When formerly the blessed man lived in the desert of Dalga he used to eat roots and herbs, and to drink water when he was able, and he passed the whole time of his life in prayer and praise... he ate only once a week." Nikolaj Velimirović writes, "He especially endeavored never to speak an untruth. He had great temptations from the demons, but overpowered them all, soberly and courageously."

=== Post-reclusion ===
It was said that Or received a vision from an angel in a dream who told him to leave his desert seclusion in old age and to become a teacher of other monks in Nitria. The angel said to him,

"You will be a great nation, and a numerous people will be entrusted to you. Those who will be saved through you will be ten myriads. And you shall be a governor in the new world, and above every one else in the world you shalt have life. For however many people you win in this world, that is the number you will lead in the age to come. Do not hesitate at all. You will never lack anything you need to the end of your life."

Or did as the angel commanded and became the spiritual father of many anchorites in the Egyptian Desert. Jerome said, "And this blessed man had for a very long time lived a life of the utmost austerity at a remote place in the desert, but subsequently he took certain monasteries in the desert which was near Shaina, and gathered together a brotherhood." The Vitae Patrum states that Or was, "the father of many monasteries".

According to tradition Or was unlettered, and yet by a divine miracle, he was able to read and memorized scripture. His disciples attested to his virtue, saying that Or never lied, swore, hurt anyone, or spoke without necessity. "And in his prayer to God he took the same pains and strove that all the needs of the brethren might be supplied ..." A certain Pistos said, "... great was Abba Or's humility."

According to Jerome, the brotherhood's numbers were so great that the resident monks devoted much of their time to making huts to accommodate all of them. The brotherhood allegedly tamed the arid region of Nitria, "... he planted so many wild trees at that spot that they formed a dense wood in the wilderness."

=== Anecdotes ===
Or taught his disciples to always be ready for the Lord to take their souls. It was said of Or and Theodore, that as they were building a cell out of clay, they said to one another, "If God should visit us now, what should we do?" Then, weeping, they left the clay there and each of them went back into his cell.

Jerome also notes that Or practiced exorcism, saying, "And there was added unto him also the gracious gift of being able to cast out devils, and many of them came to him by the constraint [of this gift], against their wills, and would shriek out through his acts." Jerome ends his writing on Or in the History of the Monks of Egypt by saying:

Now the beauty of his life and deeds made him so glorious that he was able to gather together very many monks to him, and one saw the congregation of the monks with him in the church like a band of righteous men who were splendid in their garb, and they glorified God with praises continually.

Or is said to have received the Eucharist daily during his life. He died circa 390, being at least 90 years old.

=== Veneration ===
Or's Troparion is: "'From the earth Or departed to me,' said grace, 'On behalf of Or begotten by you O law.' " He is recognized as a saint in the Catholic Church and Eastern Orthodox Church. Or's feast day is August 7 in the Orthodox Church.

== Legends ==
=== Concerning the nobleman ===
One day, a charitable nobleman by the name Longinos desired to visit Or. Longinos sought out one of Or's spiritual children and asked to be brought to the elder. The monk immediately went to Or, saying that Longinos indeed was a very charitable man. The monk then asked Or to permit the nobleman to come and see him. However, Or discerned the true reason why the monk praised Longinos. If Longinos came to their dwelling, he would surely give money to them, and in doing so incite them to avarice. With this discernment, Or refused the nobleman; would not compromise his God-given grace for financial gain. He said to the monk, "Truly, there is no need for him to cross this valley in order to see me."

=== Concerning the palm branches ===
Jerome relates another story about Or. One time, Paul, Or's disciple, departed to buy some reeds in the market. He knew that others had been before him and had paid for their goods in deposits. However, Or never paid deposits for anything; instead, he paid the full price at one time. Because of this, the disciple of Or went in search of palm-branches elsewhere. Then a farmer said to the disciple, "Someone has given me a deposit, but he has not come. So why don't you take these palm-branches?" He took them and he went back to Or and told him what had happened. The old man clapped his hands together and said (in the third-person), "Or is not going to work this year." Or did not allow the palm-branches to come inside his cell, but waited for them to be returned.

=== Other stories ===
Or once told this story of himself. The Vitae Patrum confirms that the person in the story was in fact Or himself:

I know a certain man in this desert who for three years past has not eaten anything which is of this earth, but an angel comes to him once in three days, and brings him heavenly food and places it in his mouth, and this suffices him instead of meat and drink. And I know that there came to this man in a lying vision devils who were in the forms of horses and chariots of fire and numerous horsemen, as if they had come from a king, and they said unto him, ‘You have become perfect in everything, O man, but now, bow down and worship me, and I will take you up like Elijah.’ Then the monk said in his mind, ‘I worship the King and Redeemer every day, and if this creature were a king he would not ask me to worship him now.’ And when he had said unto him that which was in his mind, ‘I have a King, and I worship Him always, and you are not a king,’ immediately the devil removed himself and was no more found.

Because of his many ascetic struggles which ailed his body, Or was constantly sickly. As Sisoes said, "Abba Or was ill for eighteen years."

Once, Or's disciples reminded him that it was the feast of the Resurrection. He is said to have raised his hands to heaven and prayed for three days without ceasing.

== Sayings of Or ==
Or is known for the spiritual guidance that he gave to his disciples. His teachings are quoted in the Sayings of the Desert Fathers.

=== On humility ===
- "The crown of the monk is humility."
- He gave this counsel, "Whenever you want to subdue your high and proud thoughts, examine your conscience carefully: Have you kept all the commandments? Have you loved your enemies and been kind to them in their misfortunes? Have you counted yourself to be an unprofitable servant and the worst of all sinners? If you find you have done all this, do not therefore think well of yourself as if you had done everything well but realize that even the thought of such things is totally destructive."
- "He who is honoured and praised beyond his merits, will suffer much condemnation, but he who is held as of no account among men will receive glory in heaven."
- When Sisoes asked Abba Or for some guidance on the spiritual life, the old man said, "In my own opinion, I put myself below all men."
- He would often say, "Do not speak in your heart against your brother like this: 'I am a man of more sober and austere life than he is,' but put yourself in subjection to the grace of Christ, in the spirit of poverty and genuine charity, or you will be overcome by the spirit of vainglory and lose all you have gained. For it is written in the Scriptures: 'Let him who stands take heed lest he fall.' (1 Corinthians 10:12) Let your salvation be founded in the Lord."
- Abba Or taught that if you slander your brother, you must say to him, "I have spoken badly of you; let this be my surety that I will not spread this slander any further."

=== Other quotes ===
- "In all temptation, do not complain about anyone else, but say about yourself, ‘These things happen to me because of my sins.’"
- "If you see that I am thinking adversely about someone, know that he is thinking in the same way about me."
- "What shall I say to you? Go, and do what you see is right; God comes to him who reproaches himself and does violence to himself in everything."
- Or said to his disciple Paul, "Be careful never to let an irrelevant word come into this cell."
- He often recited this proverb, "If you are fleeing, flee from men; or the world and the men in it will make you do many foolish things."
- "For the monk, this is the celebration of the Resurrection of Christ: to elevate his mind and unite it with God."
- "Speak the truth, never tell a lie. I know a man who never swore, never lied, never wished evil to another."
- Sisoes asked Or, "Give me, Father, come instruction" to which the abba replied, "Live as you see me live!" Then Abba Sisoes said again, "Tell me more clearly, how should I see you? Does every man hide a secret in himself?" and the abba said, "Behold, I speak to you: Of all God's creations, I consider myself the worst."
- Or taught his disciple Paul thus, "From every sin you will easily flee, if only you flee from evil conversation. For every other sin sprouts from this evil. Evil conversation is death to the soul of man; it smothers every good deed in his heart. I will say one more thing, and let it be enough: Repel all vain thoughts; repel iniquitous desires; distance yourself from material cares, and you will attain the immaterial, my son."

== Other sources ==
=== Lausaic History ===
According to Palladius (Bishop of Helenopolis, born c. 360) in the Lausaic History:

"Now in Mount Nitria (c. 390) there was a certain man whose name was Or, concerning whom men, especially all the brotherhood, testify to many of his triumphs, and also that marvelous and excellent woman Melania, the handmaid of Christ, who went into this mountain before I did. As for me, I never became acquainted with this man. And in his history they say this one thing: "He never told a lie in his life, and he never used oaths; he never uttered a curse, and beyond what was absolutely necessary he never spoke at all."

=== History of the Monks of Egypt ===
Chapter 3 of the History of the Monks of Egypt by Jerome speaks of a visit to Or. Selected excerpts are as follows:

And this blessed man had for a very long time lived a life of the utmost austerity at a remote place in the desert, but subsequently he took certain monasteries in the desert which was near Shaina, and gathered together a brotherhood, and he planted so many wild trees at that spot that they formed a dense wood in the wilderness.

And when the man of God saw us, he rejoiced in us, and saluted us, and straightway he offered up a prayer; and he washed our feet with his own hands, and began to teach us, for he was exceedingly well acquainted with the Scriptures, even as a man who had received the gift from God, and he expounded to us many chapters of the Scriptures, and delivered to us the orthodox faith; moreover, he urged us to prayer, and to partake of the Mysteries.

Now this man was more glorious in his life than very many of the fathers.

=== The Prologue of Ohrid ===
The Prologue of Ohrid (an Eastern Orthodox synaxarium) by Nikolaj Velimirović commemorates Or on August 7 and includes a 26-line "Hymn of Praise".

=== The Vitae Patrum ===
Chapters II and IX of the Vitae Patrum relate Jerome's account of Or.

== Physical appearance ==
- Rufinus who visited Or described him in this way: "...he had an angelic form and was about ninety years of age; his beard flowed down over his breast, and it was white and beautiful, and his countenance was so glorious that those that saw him were reproved by the sight thereof only."
- The Vitae Patrum says, "He was ninety years old [when we saw him], with a very full and splendid silvery beard, a lively face and appearance, reflecting something greater than mere human nature." In Chapter IX it furthermore says, "At the age of ninety he had lost nothing of his physical strength."

== See also ==
- Macarius of Egypt
- Agathon of Scetis
- Euprepius of Egypt
- Anoub
- Lot of Egypt
