= Lot of Egypt =

Egyptian Orthodox Christian monk

Saint Lot of Egypt
- Born: c. fourth or fifth century Egypt
- Died: c. fifth century Egypt
- Venerated in: Orthodox Church
- Feast: October 22
- Attributes: Charity, Humility
- Influences: Abba Peter
- Influenced: St. Joseph of Panephysis

Abba Lot was an Egyptian Orthodox Christian monk and saint who lived around the 4th and 5th centuries in a monastery near Arsinoe (Al-Fayoum), lower Egypt, by a marshy lake. Abba Lot "...directed many brethren on the path to salvation." He was one of the Desert Fathers.

Abba Lot died peacefully in the fifth century. His feast day is October 22 in the Orthodox Church.

== Life ==
Abba Lot was a disciple of St. Joseph of Panephysis and a companion of St. Arsenius the Great and St. Agathon. He was an ascetic who lived near Arsinoe, close to Anthony the Great. His disciple was St. Peter the Pionite (died c. 400). Abba Lot opposed the Origenists.

== Sayings ==
- "Take heart: no sin is beyond God’s mercy. Repentance is always possible."
- Abba Lot once said to his spiritual father, Abba Joseph, "Father, I fast as much as I can, continue in prayer, keep silence and contemplate, and also, through abstinence, guard myself from impure thoughts. What else can I do?" Then Abba Joseph stood up, raised his hands to heaven, and his ten fingers shone like ten flaming candles. He said, "If you desire, you can become all aflame!"
- "Compunction is the absolute master. One cannot protect oneself where there is no compunction."

== Stories ==
An old man once came to Abba Lot and was ill. Abba Lot gave him a cell and took care of him, feeding him. He would direct visitors to this old man. When the old man began to teach the Origen heresy to the visitors, Abba Lot became distressed. He consulted St. Arsenius, who instructed Lot to ask to old man to stop teaching Origenism or to depart. The old man, disliking the desert, decided to leave.

Another time, a monk who had committed the sins of fornication and idol worship came to Abba Lot, tormented by his sins. He told the elder that he could not reveal his sins to the other elders and therefore could not confess. Abba Lot told him that he would bear half the weight of the sins for the man. Thus, the man confessed and was instructed in penance. Immediately, half the weight of the grievous sins lifted off the man's back. He stayed with Abba Lot for the rest of his life under his spiritual guidance.

The following story is from the Sayings of the Desert Fathers:

Abba Lot used to say, "Your key opens my door." The brother said to him, "What does that mean?" The old man said, "When someone comes to see you, you say to him, 'How are you? Where have you come from? How are the brethren? Did they welcome you or not?' Then you have opened the brother’s door and you will hear a great deal that you would rather not have heard." The brother said to him, "That is so. What should a man do, then, when a brother comes to see him?" Abba Lot said, "Compunction is the absolute master. One cannot protect oneself where there is no compunction." The brother said, "When I am in my cell, compunction is with me, but if someone comes to see me or I go out of my cell, I do not have it any more." The old man said, "That means that you do not really have compunction at all yet. It is merely that you practise it sometimes. It is written in the Law: 'When you buy a Hebrew slave, he shall serve six years and in the seventh he shall go free, for nothing. If you give him a wife and he brings forth sons in your house and he does not wish to go because of his wife and children, you shall lead him to the door of the house and you shall pierce his ear with an awl and he shall become your slave for ever'" (cf. Ex. 21:2-6). The brother said, "What does that mean?" The old man said, "If a man works as hard as he can at anything, at the moment when he seeks what needs, he will find it." The brother said, "Please explain this to me." The old man said, "The illegitimate will not remain in anyone’s service; it is the legitimate son who will not leave his father."

== Commemoration ==
Abba Lot is commemorated in The Prologue of Ohrid by St. Nikolaj Velimirović on October 22.

== See also ==
- Desert Fathers
- Arsenius the Great
- Or of Nitria
- Anoub
- Euprepius of Egypt
- Agathon of Scetis
- Nikolaj Velimirović
