= Anoub =

Egyptian Christian Desert Father

Saint Anoub of Scetis the Signbearer
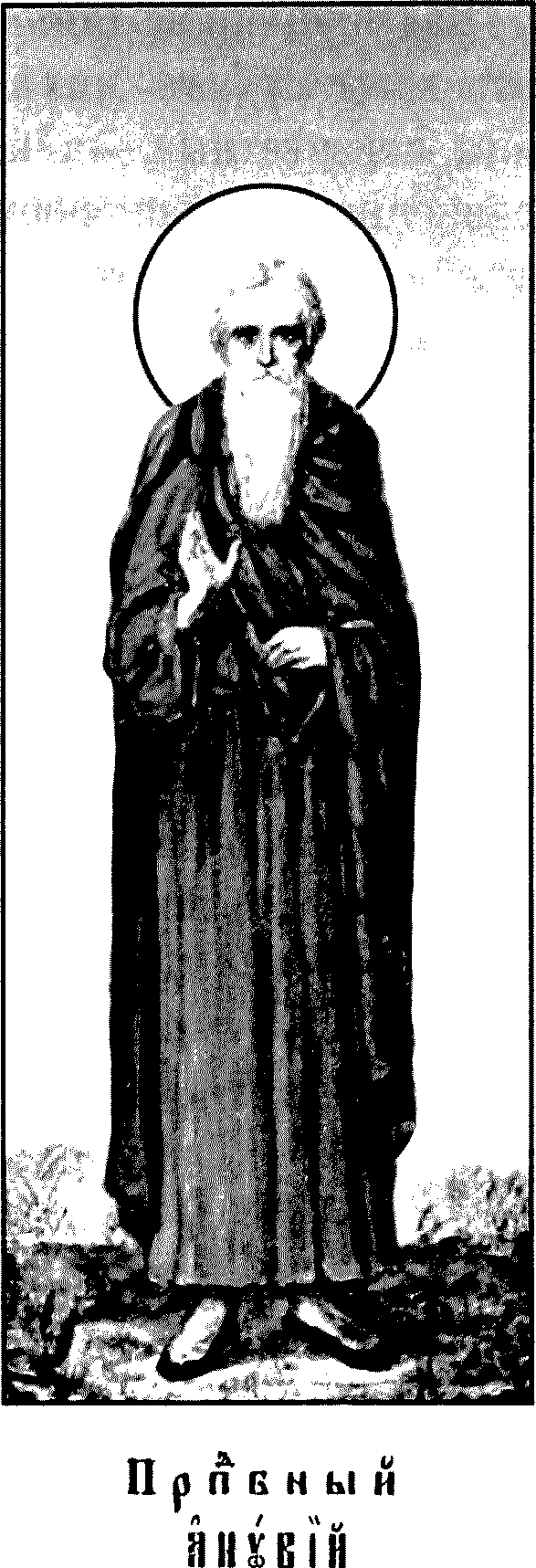

Desert Father, Venerable, Sign-bearer
- Born: Early 4th century Egypt
- Died: Mid-5th century Scetis, Egypt
- Venerated in: Eastern Orthodox Church, Roman Catholic Church
- Feast: June 5 June 6
- Attributes: Anchorite, confessor, sign-bearer, clairvoyant
- Influences: Abba Poemen
- Tradition or genre: Desert Fathers

Abba Anoub, also known as Anoub of Scetis, Anoub the Signbearer or Anoubius, was an Egyptian Christian Desert Father, ascetic and anchorite who lived during the 4th and 5th centuries in Scetis, Lower Egypt (modern day Wadi El Natrun). Abba Anoub is mentioned in the Sayings of the Desert Fathers, also called the Apophthegmata or the Gerontikon. Saint Nikolaj Velimirović, writing in the Prologue of Ohrid, describes him as "one of the great Egyptian monks."

Verse: "Anoub performed signs and died gracefully, as one alive he hitherto shows forth to be living."

== Life ==
Anoub was one of the seven blood-brothers of Poemen, along with Paësius. Poemen was their elder, although Anoub was the eldest by age. It is said that prior to his tonsure as a monk, Anoub was persecuted as a Christian. "He suffered much for the true Faith."

After the first attack of Scetis by the Mazices barbarians from 407 to 408 AD which led to the diaspora of the monks, the seven brothers moved to the ancient city of Terenuthis (modern day Al-Tarrānah in the Western Delta), Lower Egypt, at which point Abba Anoub assumed leadership of the new monastic settlement. They created a cenobitic community in Terenuthis, where they temporarily occupied a former pagan temple. According to Sister Benedicta Ward:

The Devastation of Scetis marks a turning point in the history of early monasticism in Egypt; the monks dispersed, and gradually the centre shifted from Egypt to Palestine. This story of Anoub and his brothers indicates a new reason for the formation of cenobitic communities, that is, protection against invaders.

It was said that Abba Anoub and his brothers kept a strict ascesis in which they devoted all their time to either prayer or manual labor, leaving only four hours a night to sleep. Abba Anoub reposed peacefully in the second half of the fifth century.

== Sayings ==
- Abba Anoub said, "Since the day when the name of Christ was invoked upon me [at baptism], no lie has come out of my mouth."
- Once Abba Anoub desired to remain in silence among his brothers, saying, "For love's sake do this: let each of us live in quietness, each one by himself, without meeting one another the whole week."
- "For if a man attains to the measure of this saying, such that he acquires purity and sees the sins of his brother, he succeeds, by the power of his virtue, in swallowing overlooking them. He who reproaches himself justifies his neighbor, and this righteousness conceals his neighbor’s sins."
- Abba Poemen said of Abba Anoub after his death, "We lived together in complete unity and unbroken peace till death broke up our association."
- Abba Anoub said to another monk, "If a man really affirms this saying, when he sees his brother's faults he sees that his integrity exceeds his faults." The brother said, "What is integrity?" The old man replied, "Always to accuse himself."

== Stories ==
The following story was related about Abba Anoub. When the seven brothers had fled from the invasion of Scetis, they stayed temporarily in an abandoned pagan temple. Every morning, Abba Anoub would throw stones at a statue in the temple, and every evening he would say to the statue, "Forgive me!" When Abba Poemen asked him why he acted in such a way, he said, "I did this for your sake. When you saw me throwing stones at the face of the statue, did it speak, or did it become angry?" Abba Poemen said, "No." Thus Abba Anoub continued, "Or again, when I bent down in penitence, was it moved, and did it say, 'I will not forgive you?'" Again Abba Poemen answered "No." Then the old man resumed, "Now we are seven brethren; if you wish us to live together, let us be like this statue, which is not moved whether one beats it or whether one flatters it. If you do not wish to become like this, there are four doors here in the temple, let each one go where he will." The seven brothers decided to remain together and to follow Abba Anoub's words.

Another time, Abba Anoub's brother, Abba Paësius, said to him, "You know how austerely Abba Poemen talks; come, let us establish a monastery somewhere else, and let the two of us remain there, without cares." Abba Paësius showed him a small chest of gold with which they could start a monastery. Anoub knew that his brother's greed could lead him to destruction, but rather than admonish him harshly, Anoub pretended to agree with him and go with him, offering to hold the chest of gold during their journey. Yet when they crossed the river, Anoub feigned that he had lost his balance and dropped the gold in the river, losing all of it. Then Paësius said to him: "Do not be distressed, Abba; for, since the coins have been lost, we can return to our brother." They returned and lived in peace. Thus, Abba Anoub worked to hide the sins of others and save them.

Before Abba Anoub's death, three aged hermits visited him. He, being a clairvoyant, revealed to them the secrets of their hearts.

== Sources about Anoub ==
- The Sayings of the Desert Fathers contains multiple references from Abba Poemen about Abba Anoub.
- The Prologue of Ohrid by St. Nikolaj Velimirović commemorates Abba Anoub on June 5 and includes a 26-line "Hymn of Praise".

== See also ==
- Desert Fathers
- Poemen
- Agathon (monk)
- Lot (monk)
- Or (monk)
- Euprepius of Egypt
- Eastern Orthodoxy
