= Ćelije Monastery =

Monastery in Serbia

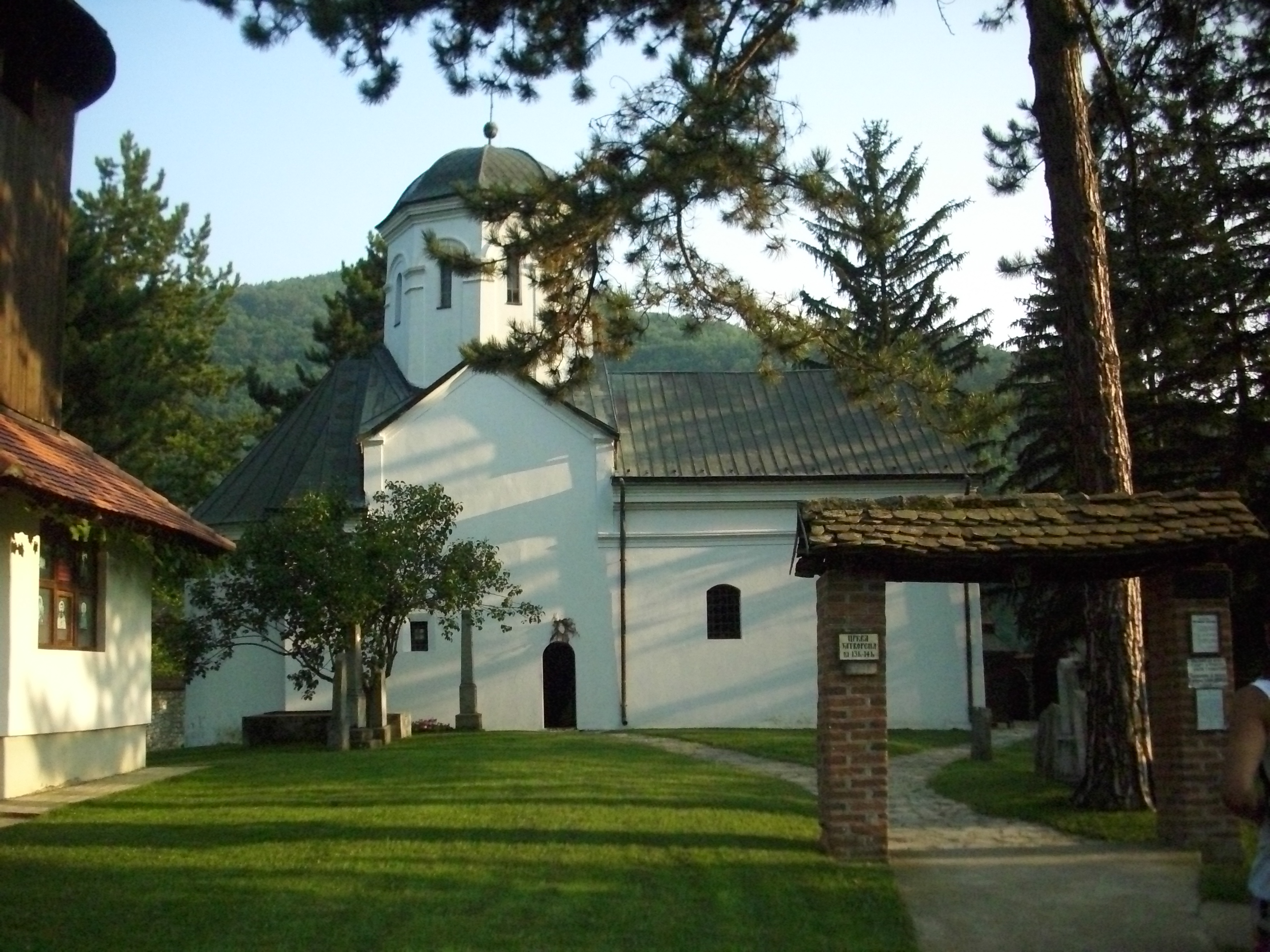
- Interactive map of Ćelije Monastery

Monastery information
- Other names: Monastery of St. Archangels Michael and Gabriel
- Order: Serbian Orthodox
- Established: late 13th century
- Dedication: St. Archangels Michael and Gabriel

People
- Founder: Stephen Dragutin of Serbia
- Important associated figures: Justin Popović

Site
- Location: Lelić, Valjevo, Serbia
- Coordinates: 44°14′7.728″N 19°52′3.9″E
- Public access: Yes

The Ćelije Monastery (Serbian: Манастир Ћелије, romanized: Manastir Ćelije) is a Serbian Orthodox monastery dedicated to St. Archangel Michael. It was founded in the late 13th century. Today, monastery is surrounded with tall trees, so cannot be seen from far.

It is best known by being the monastery of saint Justin Popović, (1894–1979), who was canonized by the Serbian Orthodox Church in 2010.

Ćelije Monastery was declared Monument of Culture of Great Importance in 1979, and it is protected by Republic of Serbia.

== See also ==
- List of Serbian Orthodox monasteries
