= Theodore of Enaton =

4th century Egyptian Christian monk

Theodore of Enaton was an Egyptian Christian monk who lived in the monastery of Enaton in Lower Egypt during the 4th century. He was one of the Desert Fathers. Theodore of Enaton was a disciple of Abba Amoun and was also a companion of Abba Or.

In 308 A.D., Theodore went to live as a monk in Enaton.
