= Euprepius of Egypt =

4th century Christian monk

Desert Father, Venerable
- Born: c. 4th century Egypt
- Died: c. 4th or 5th century Egypt
- Honored in: Eastern Orthodox Church; Coptic Orthodox Church

Euprepius of Egypt (Greek: Ευπρέπειος, romanized: Efprepios) was an Egyptian Orthodox Christian monk, ascetic, and saint who lived around the 4th century. All of his recorded sayings exist in the Sayings of the Desert Fathers (Greek: Ἀποφθέγματα Τῶν Πατέρων, romanized: Apofthégmata Tón Patéron), and little else is known about him.

== Sayings ==
All quotations from the Sayings of the Desert Fathers that are attributed to Euprepius of Egypt:

- "Knowing that God is faithful and mighty, have faith in him and you will share what is his. If you are depressed, you do not believe. We all believe that he is mighty and we believe all is possible to him. As for your own affairs, behave with faith in him about them, too, for he is able to work miracles in you also."
- "Bodily things are compounded of matter. He who loves the world loves occasions of falling. Therefore if we happen to lose something, we must accept this with joy and gratitude, realizing that we have been set free from care."
- A brother questioned Abba Euprepius about his life. And the old man said, "Eat straw, wear straw, sleep on straw: that is to say, despise everything and acquire for yourself a heart of iron."
- A brother asked the same old man, "How does the fear of God dwell in the soul?" The old man said, "If a man is possessed of humility and poverty, and if he does not judge others, the fear of God will come to him."
- "May fear, humility, lack of food and compunction be with you."

== See also ==
- Desert Fathers
- Or of Nitria
- Anoub
- Lot of Egypt
- Agathon of Scetis
