= Justin Popović =

Eastern Orthodox theologian (1894–1979)

Saint Justin of Ćelije Justin of Vranje
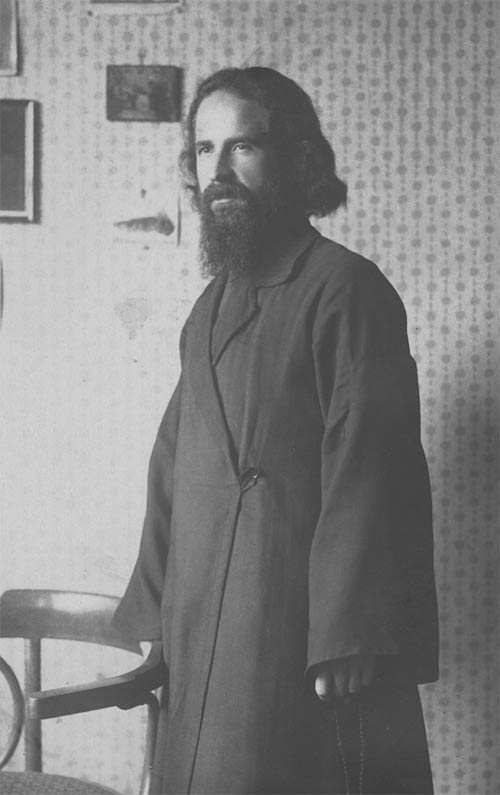
- Saint Justin as a professor in Belgrade

Venerable father
- Born: Blagoje Popović; 6 April 1894; Vranje, Kingdom of Serbia
- Died: 7 April 1979 (aged 85); Ćelije Monastery, SR Serbia, SFR Yugoslavia
- Venerated in: Eastern Orthodox Church
- Canonized: 2 May 2010 by Serbian Orthodox Church
- Major shrine: Ćelije Monastery
- Feast: 14 June (O.S. 1 June)
- Attributes: Shown holding a hagiography book

Justin Popović (Serbian Cyrillic: Јустин Поповић, Serbian pronunciation: [jǔstin pǒpoʋitɕ], secular name Blagoje Popović, Serbian Cyrillic: Благоје Поповић; 6 April 1894 – 7 April 1979) was a Serbian Orthodox theologian, archimandrite of the Ćelije Monastery, Dostoyevsky scholar, writer, anti-communist advocate and critic of the pragmatic church ecclesiastical life.

On 2 May 2010, he was canonized as a saint as Justin of Ćelije, Justin of Vranje or Justin Novi by the Holy Synod of the Serbian Orthodox Church. In English, his name is sometimes spelled "Iustin Popovich".

== Early life ==
Popović was born to Spiridon, a sexton, and Anastasija Popović, in the southern Serbian town of Vranje, on 6 April 1894. At his baptism, he was given the name Blagoje after the Feast of the Annunciation (Blagovest means "Annunciation" or "Good News"). He was born into a priestly family, as seven previous generations (not including his father) of the Popovićs (Pop is Serbian for "priest") were headed by priests.

He completed his nine-year studies at the University of Belgrade's Faculty of Theology in 1914. In the early 20th century, the School of St. Sava in Belgrade was renowned throughout the Orthodox world as a holy place of extreme asceticism as well as of a high quality of scholarship. Some of the well-known professors were the rector, Fr. Domentian; Professor Fr. Dositheus, later a bishop; Athanas Popović; and the ecclesiastical composer, Stevan Mokranjac. Still, one professor stood head and shoulders above the rest: the hieromonk, Nikolaj Velimirović, professor of philosophy and theology.

=== World War I ===
During the early part of World War I, in autumn of 1914, Popović served as a student nurse primarily in Shkodër, Niš and throughout Kosovo. While in this capacity, he contracted typhus during the winter of 1914 and had to spend over a month in a hospital in Niš. On 8 January 1915, he resumed his duties sharing the destiny of the Serbian Army from Peć to Skadar during which 100,000 Serbian soldiers died. On 1 January 1916 he entered the monastic order in the Orthodox cathedral of Shkodër and took the name of Justin after St. Justin the Philosopher.

=== Russia ===
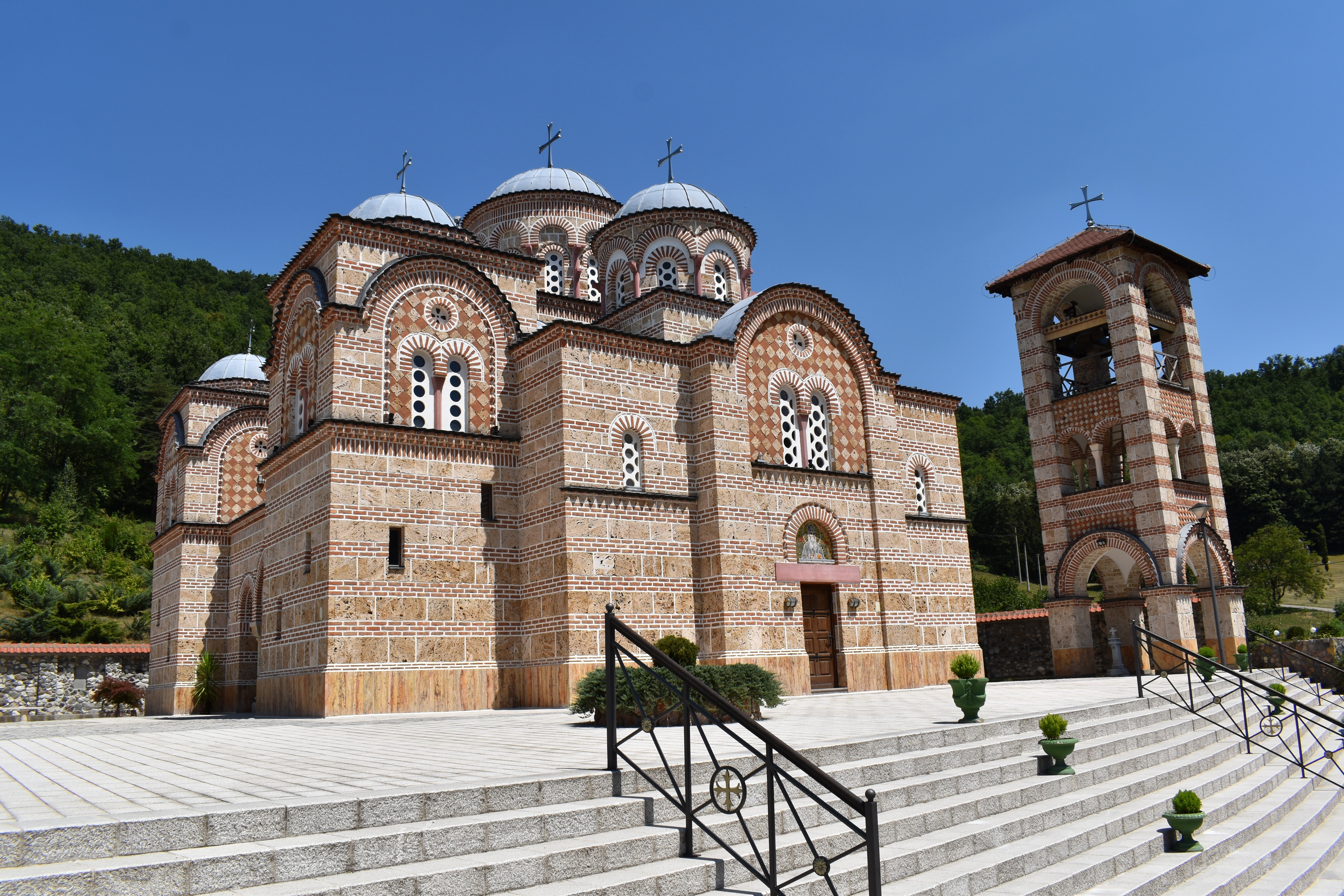
Ćelije Monastery

Shortly after he had become a monk, Popović, along with several other students travelled to Petrograd, Russia, for study in the Orthodox Seminary there. It was there the young Popović first dedicated himself more fully to Orthodoxy and the monastic way of life. He learned of the great Russian ascetics: St. Anthony and Theodosius of the Caves in Kiev, St. Seraphim of Sarov, St. Sergius of Radonezh, St. John of Kronstadt and others.

=== Oxford ===
After his year's study and sojourn in Russia, Popović entered the Theological School in Oxford, England, at the prompting of his spiritual father, Nikolaj. Popović studied theology in London from 1916 to 1926, but his doctoral thesis under the title "Filozofija i religija F. M. Dostojevskog" (The Philosophy and Religion of Fyodor Mikhailovich Dostoevsky) was not accepted because of its radical criticism of Western humanism, rationalism, Roman Catholicism and anthropocentrism. It was subsequently printed in 1923, when Popović became the editor of the Orthodox journal The Christian Life. Together with his colleagues from the Oxford University, he edited the periodical The Christian Life for twenty years.

=== Athens ===
In 1926, Popović was promoted to the title of the Doctor of Theology at the Faculty of Theology, university in Athens, Greece, his dissertation being "Problem ličnosti i saznanja po Sv. Makariju Egipatskom" — The Problem of Personality and Consciousness According to St. Macarius of Egypt. For his course on the Lives of the Saints, he began to translate into Serbian the Lives of the Saints from the Greek, Syriac and Slavonic sources, as well as numerous minor works of the Fathers (homilies of John Chrysostom, Macarius and Isaac the Syrian). He also wrote The Theory of Knowledge According to St. Isaac, which was derived from The Ascetical Homilies of Isaac the Syrian.

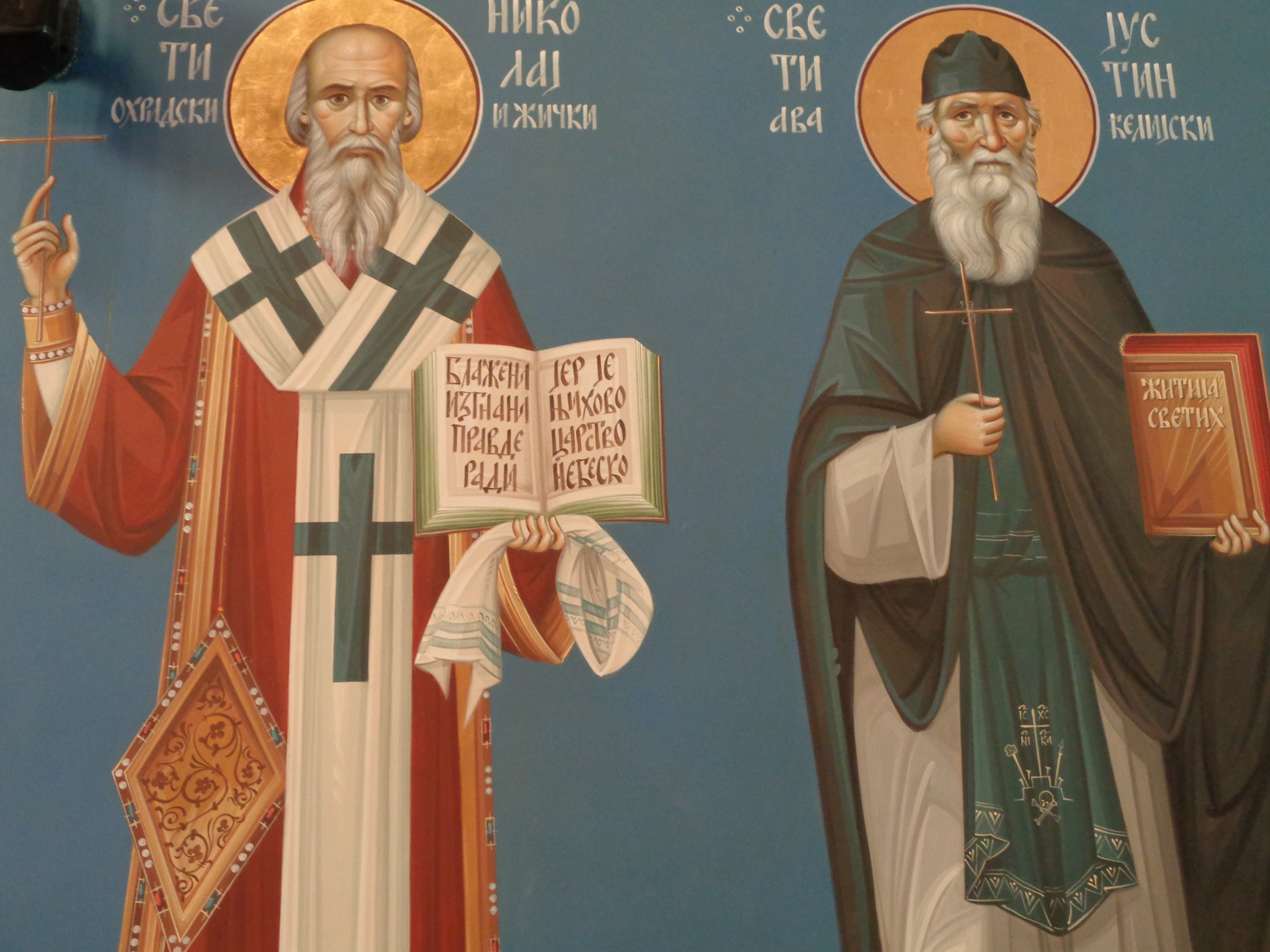
Frescoes of two notable Serbian theologians, Saint Nikolaj Velimirović and Saint Justin Popović

From 1930 to 1932, after a short period as Professor in the Theological Academy of St. Cyril and Methodius in Prizren, Serbia, he was an associate of Bishop Joseph (Cvijovich) of Bitola and the man tasked with reorganising the Church of the Carpatho-Russians in Czechoslovakia. The area had seen an increase in those espousing Uniatism, with previously converted Christians of those regions started their conversion back to Eastern Orthodoxy.

Nikolaj Velimirović, John Maximovich of Shanghai and San Francisco, and Popović crossed paths in Bitola.The young Maximovich (a Russian of Serbian ancestry) was Popović's assistant at the theological seminary there, and Velimirović was the Bishop of Ohrid, Macedonia.

=== Belgrade ===
Popović was chosen in 1934 as professor of dogmatics at the Theological Faculty of St. Sava in Belgrade. As a professor at the University of Belgrade, he was one of the founders in 1938 of the Serbian Philosophical Society along with a number of noted Belgrade intellectuals.

He was also the professor of dogmatics at the Faculty of Orthodox Theology of the University of Belgrade from 1934 until 1945, until World War II. In 1945, with the establishment of the communist state and state atheism, his anti-communism and efforts to convert others to Christianity had little place.

== Communist regime ==
After World War II, Popović was considered ineligible by the communist government to continue as a professor at the seminary. Together with a few fellow professors, he was ousted from the Faculty in 1945. Popović spent 31 years in the Ćelije Monastery under the continuous surveillance of the Communist police. The Communists limited his public appearances within monastic confines. While Bishop Nikolaj Velimirović never returned to Yugoslavia after the World War II, Popović actively participated in the organization of the Serbian Orthodox Church. That was perhaps because unlike Velimirović, Popović was not a bishop but a hieromonk. He was expelled not only from the faculty but also frequently subjected to interrogation and imprisonment, often facing threats to his very life. Finally, in 1948, he found a relatively safe refuge at the Ćelije Monastery, where he devoted himself to translation and to writing *The Lives of the Saints*.

== Death ==
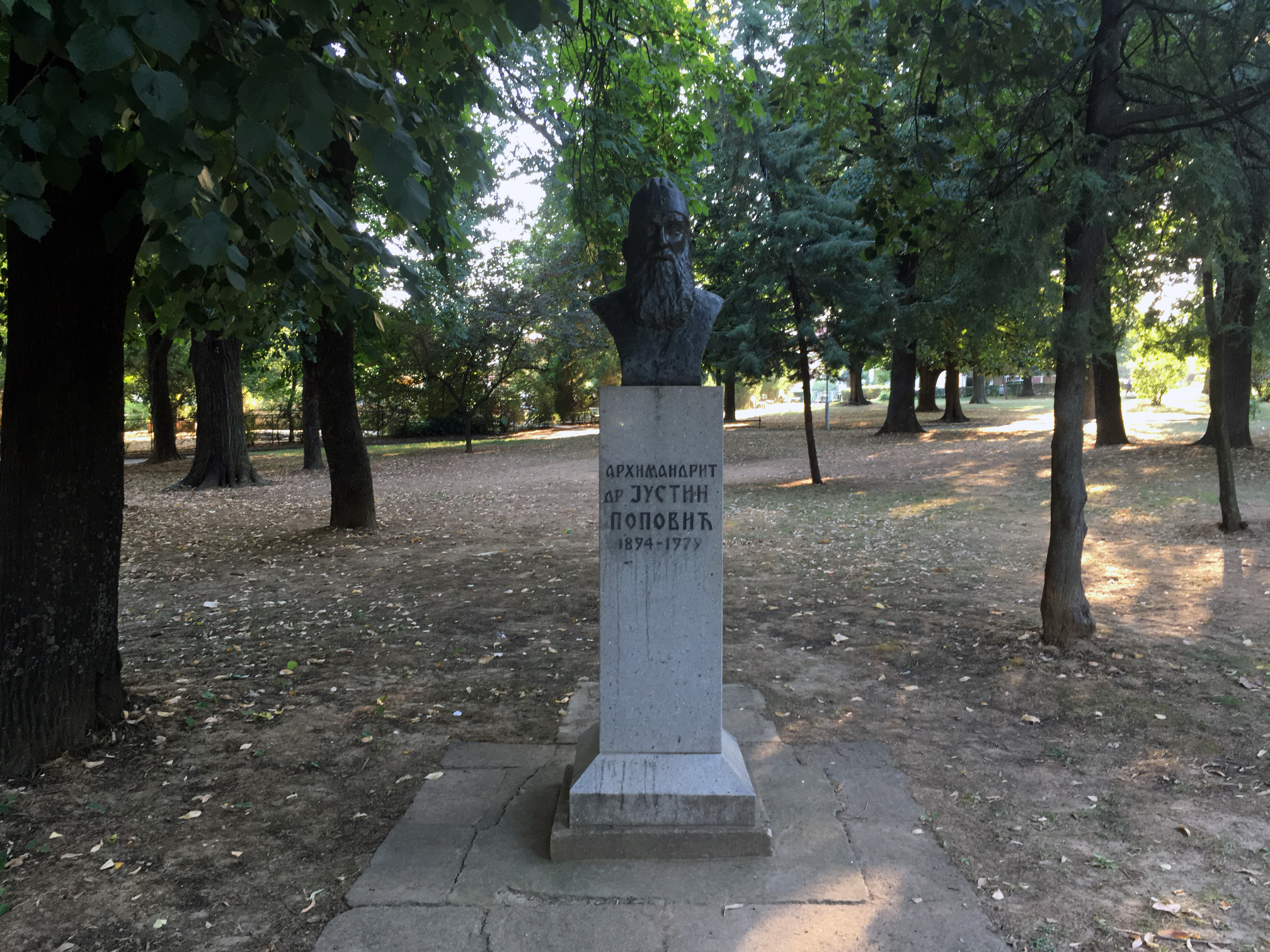
A bust of Popović in Vranje

Popović died the day after his birthday, on the day of the Feast of the Annunciation (25 March by the Julian Calendar).

== Legacy ==
=== Notable theologian ===
Porfirije, Serbian Patriarch, stated that Popović is one of the three most notable Serbian theologians recognised internationally.

John Zizioulas – one of the most influential Orthodox theologians of the 20th and 21st centuries– however said the following about Father Justin:

"I have not met a more profound and intelligent orthodox theologian than him."

=== A fierce opponent of ecumenism, but... ===
A devoted monk and philosopher of the Eastern Orthodox theology, Popović was a great critic of "ecumenism, providing it was inclined towards relativization of God's Truth", according to Professor John Meyendorff and every bit as much a critic of the "Catholic novelties" and — according to Archimandrite Popović — "the Pope's anti-Christianity".

Anti-ecumenical ideas.

Professor Franc Perko, the former Archbishop in Belgrade, wrote: »I can not understand that this man, a thinker, philosopher, theologian, who lived as a Saint, was so unilateral, sometimes, so blind and unjust in his estimation of the occidental Christianity.«

Protiekumenske ideje

Profesor Franc Perko, nekdanji beograjski nadškof, se je »večkrat spraševal, kako je ta mož, mislec, filozof in teolog, ki je živel kot svetnik, mogel biti tako enostranski, včasih tako slep in krivičen pri presoji zahodnega krščanstva«.

Conversely, Zlatko Matić’s article "John Zizioulas in the Letters of Holy Father Justin (Popović)" confirms the notion that, in the view of both Zizioulas and Popović, the Orthodox Church ought to be present in ecumenical dialogue and open to diversity, rather than remaining insular as a confession of faith. Zizioulas demonstrates this through his personal participation in ecumenical dialogue, a stance sincerely supported by Justin, as evidenced by their private correspondence between 1966 and 1971. Despite his outward image—and the fact that opponents of ecumenism also claim him as their own, not without reason—he cannot truly be characterized as such. It is evident that he did not oppose sound, theologically grounded ecumenical dialogue; indeed, he actively supported Zizioulas and, more generally, any "ecumenist" whose position was rooted in patristic tradition.

=== The secret conscience ===
Until the end of his life, however Popović was a dedicated creator, and it is no wonder that his work is considered as "a great contribution to the Orthodox theology" and he himself as "the secret conscience of the Serbian Church and the entire martyr's Orthodox religion", according to John Karmiris, the Greek academician. His example (Popović's) has been invoked by the Church of Greece Synod, in the strict sense, which banned prayers with members of other Christian denominations.

== Works ==
- The Philosophy and Religion of F.M. Dostoevsky (1923),
- Dogmatics of the Orthodox Church, I-III (1932, 1935, 1980)
- The Progress in the Death Mill (1933)
- The Foundations of Theology (1939)
- Dostoevsky on Europe and Slavism (1940)
- Philosophical Abysses (1957)
- The Man and the God-Man (1969 in the Greek language)
- Hagiographies of the Saints, I-XII (1972–1977)
- The Orthodox Church and Ecumenism (1974, in the Greek and Serbian languages, 2001, in English, Lazarica Press UK)
- Praznične besede
- Pashalne besede
- Nedeljne besede
- Svetosavlje kao filozofija života
- Put Bogopoznanja
- Setve i žetve
- Druge besede
- Akatisti
- Tumačenje Svetog Jevanđelja po Mateju
- Tumačenje Svetog Jevanđelja po Jovanu
- Tumačenje poslanica Svetog Jovana Bogoslova
- Tumačenje poslanica prve i druge Korinićanima Svetog apostola Pavla
- Tumačenje poslanice Efescima
- Tumačenje poslanice Filipljanima i Kalošanima Svetog apostola Pavla
- Tumačenje poslanice Galatima I-II
- Tumačenje poslanice Solunjanima Svetog apostola Pavla
