= Agathon of Scetis =

Christian monk and saint (d. 435 AD)

Abba Agathon of Egypt
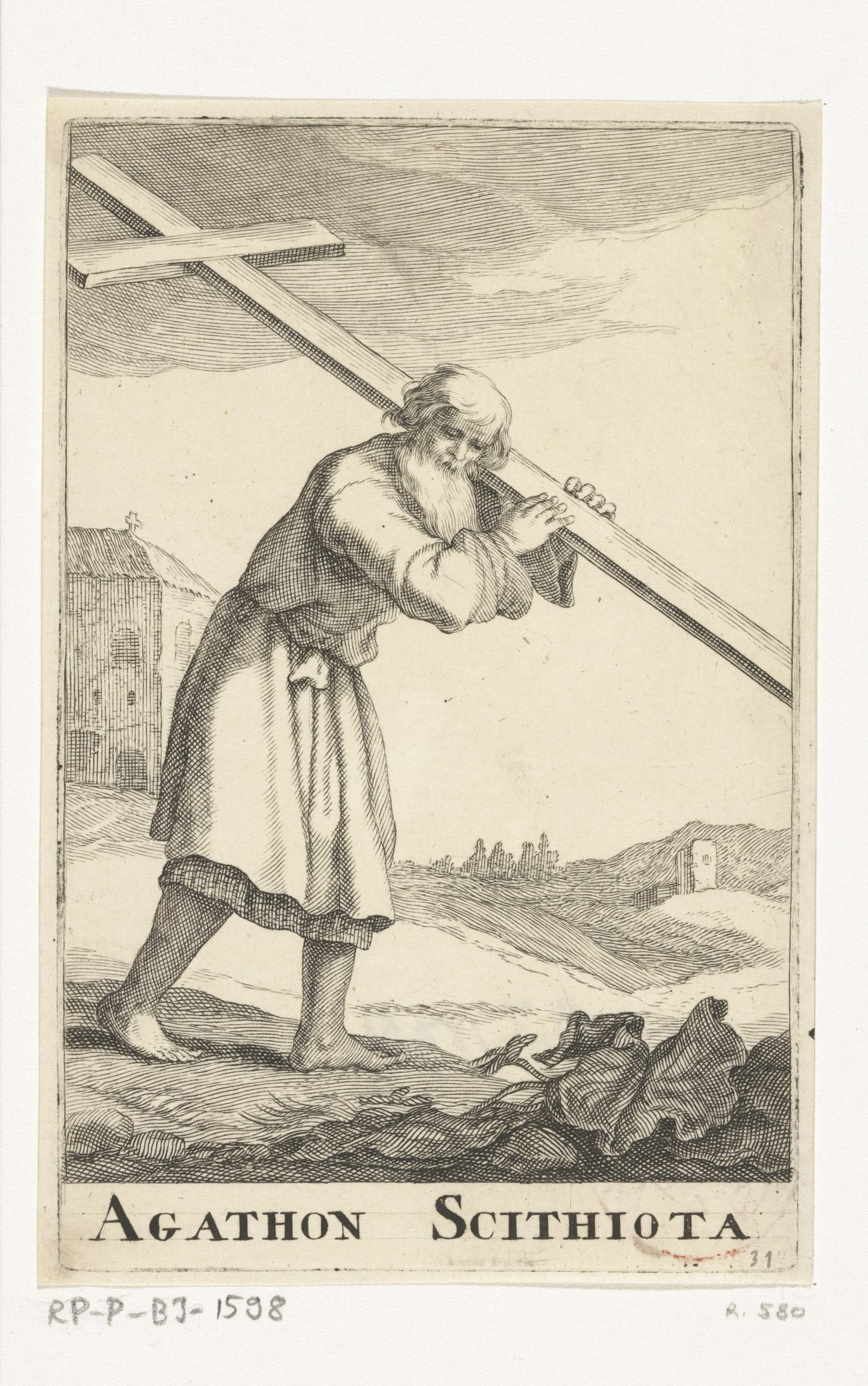
- Agathon carrying the paralytic.
- Born: Abba Agathon c. 4th century Tinnis, Egypt
- Residence: Scetes
- Died: c. 435 AD; Egypt
- Venerated in: Eastern Orthodox Church
- Feast: 2 March; 8 January
- Influences: Poemen

Abba Agathon was an Egyptian Christian monk and saint who lived around the 4th century in Scetis, Lower Egypt, and was known for his meekness and discernment. He was a disciple of Abba Lot and Abba Poemen and a contemporary of notable Desert Fathers Amun, Macarius, Joseph and Peter. He is venerated as a saint in the Eastern Orthodox Church on 2 March. Agathon was one of the Desert Fathers.

== Life ==
Abba Agathon was trained in the Thebaid by Poemen when he was a young man. According to the Sayings of the Desert Fathers, he was highly regarded by Poemen, who called him "Abba" (father) even though Agathon was still young. He was known for his exceptional meekness, accounting himself the most sinful of all men. He was a disciple of Abba Lot.

Abba Agathon lived in Scetis with Alexander and Zoilus, who were later disciples of Arsenius. He moved after the destruction of Scetis and lived near Troe (Τρώη / Τροία) close to the Nile with his disciple Abraham. It was said of Abba Agathon that he often travelled taking nothing but his knife for making wicker-baskets. He, even in old age, provided everything he needed for himself by manual labor. The abba is said to have even lived for three consecutive years with a stone in his mouth to help himself learn silence and abstinence from speech.

At his death, Abba Agathon remained for three days with his eyes open. The brothers asked him where he was, and he replied saying that he was at the Judgement Seat of God. When his disciples asked him if he was afraid, he said, "Until this moment, I have done my utmost to keep the commandments of God; but I am a man; how should I know if my deeds are acceptable to God?" When they questioned him more, he said, "Truly the judgement of God is not that of man." Dorotheus of Gaza twice quotes the final words of Abba Agathon in his exhortations to his monks.

Abba Agathon died around AD 435.

== Notable stories ==
Once certain monks came to Abba Agathon to test him, falsely accusing him of being a fornicator, a speaker of nonsense, a proud man, and a heretic. He accepted all their accusations as true except for their assertion that he was a heretic. Amazed by his humility, they left edified.

Abba Agathon once admonished a brother monk for desiring to take a single discarded green pea on the roadside. He told this monk to never take anything that wasn't his. Likewise, a brother once came to him with a piece of nitre from a tree he found on the road. The abba admonished him also and commanded him to return that which he had taken.

Abba Agathon charged his disciples to sell their good in the market for the first price that the buyer asked for. Similarly, they would buy goods at the first price presented to them rather than negotiating.

Once Abba Agathon encountered a sick man on the road to the market. He took him to a cell and paid for his rent for four months until the sick man was well again.

Another time Abba Agathon saw a paralytic on the roadside. The man asked to be carried to the market, and thus the abba did. Upon request from the man, the abba used all of the proceeds from his sale at the market to buy such and such things for the man. When they had finished, he brought him back to where found him as he had asked. Suddenly, the man spoke to Abba Agathon telling him that he had divine virtues, and disappeared. Alas, it was not a paralytic, but an angel who had come to test him.

In The Prologue of Ohrid the story is related of how a monk complimented Abba Agathon of a small knife that he used to cut brushwood. Upon hearing the compliment, the abba immediately gave the monk the knife as a gift.

== Troparion (Tone 8) ==
A troparion (tone 8) dedicated to Agathon:

By a flood of tears you made the desert fertile,
and your longing for God brought forth fruits in abundance.
By the radiance of miracles you illumined the whole universe!
O our holy father Agathon, pray to Christ our God to save our souls!

== Verse ==
A verse dedicated to Agathon:

With cheerfulness and peace of heart, Agathon in solitude remembered his death.

== See also ==
- Anoub
- Euprepius of Egypt
- Lot of Egypt
- Or of Nitria
