= Dalga =

Dalga دلجا
- Village
- Location in Egypt
- Coordinates: 27°39′N 30°42′E
- Country: Egypt
- Governorate: Minya

Population (2006)
  - Total: 63,751
- Time zone: UTC+2 (EET)
  - Summer (DST): UTC+3 (EEST)

Dalga (Note: Also spelled Delga, Delja, Dilja) (Egyptian Arabic: دلجا; Coptic: ⲧϫⲉⲗⲓ, ⲉⲧⲉⲗⲕⲉ) is a village of about 120,000 people in Minya Governorate in Egypt. It is the largest village in Egypt and the second largest in Africa behind Saaba, Burkina Faso.

In the 4th century, Dalga was the original residence of Abba Or of Nitria, an Egyptian Orthodox Christian ascetic venerated as a saint.

On 3 July 2013, the day Mohamed Morsi was deposed from power by the Egyptian military, Dalga was occupied by Islamists who drove out the police and assumed power. Under Islamist rule the ancient Coptic Christian Monastery of the Virgin Mary and St. Abraam was looted and burned as were the Catholic and Anglican churches; Christians were terrorized. Two attempts by the Egyptian military to take the town during the summer of 2013 failed. Egyptian police retook the town in a pre-dawn attack September 16, 2013.

== Climate ==
Köppen-Geiger climate classification system classifies its climate as hot desert (BWh).

Climate data for Dalga
| Month | Jan | Feb | Mar | Apr | May | Jun | Jul | Aug | Sep | Oct | Nov | Dec | Year |
|---|---|---|---|---|---|---|---|---|---|---|---|---|---|
| Mean daily maximum °C (°F) | 21.1 (70.0) | 23.3 (73.9) | 26.5 (79.7) | 31.5 (88.7) | 34.5 (94.1) | 35.3 (95.5) | 35.4 (95.7) | 34.8 (94.6) | 32.3 (90.1) | 30.9 (87.6) | 26.6 (79.9) | 22.3 (72.1) | 29.5 (85.2) |
| Daily mean °C (°F) | 12 (54) | 14 (57) | 16.9 (62.4) | 21.7 (71.1) | 25.3 (77.5) | 26.7 (80.1) | 27.3 (81.1) | 27.1 (80.8) | 24.9 (76.8) | 22.9 (73.2) | 18.3 (64.9) | 14.2 (57.6) | 20.9 (69.7) |
| Mean daily minimum °C (°F) | 3 (37) | 4.7 (40.5) | 7.3 (45.1) | 11.9 (53.4) | 16.2 (61.2) | 18.2 (64.8) | 19.2 (66.6) | 19.4 (66.9) | 17.6 (63.7) | 14.9 (58.8) | 10.1 (50.2) | 6.1 (43.0) | 12.4 (54.3) |
| Average precipitation mm (inches) | 0 (0) | 1 (0.0) | 1 (0.0) | 0 (0) | 0 (0) | 0 (0) | 0 (0) | 0 (0) | 0 (0) | 0 (0) | 0 (0) | 1 (0.0) | 3 (0) |
Source: Climate-Data.org, altitude: 46m
