= Lelić =

- Village (Selo)
- Location within Serbia
- Coordinates: 44°13′N 19°50′E
- Country: Serbia
- District: Kolubara District
- Municipality: Valjevo

Population (2002)
  - Total: 568
- Time zone: UTC+1 (CET)
  - Summer (DST): UTC+2 (CEST)

Lelić is a village in the municipality of Valjevo, Serbia. According to the 2002 census, the village has a population of 568 people.

There are several hills (vis) around Lelić, such as Brdo, which the village is situated on, Prljuša, Mlađevi, Markovac, Vrana, Strmna Gora, Ječmište, and on the eastern side Bobija, Kaluđersko Brdo and Ćelijske Strane. There are two springs, Ljutenac below Prljuša and Studenac below Mlađevi.

Saint Nikolaj Velimirović of Ohrid and Žiča of the Serbian Orthodox Church is buried there, next to his parents and nephew.

Several historical Orthodox Christian monasteries are located near Lelić.

== Gallery ==
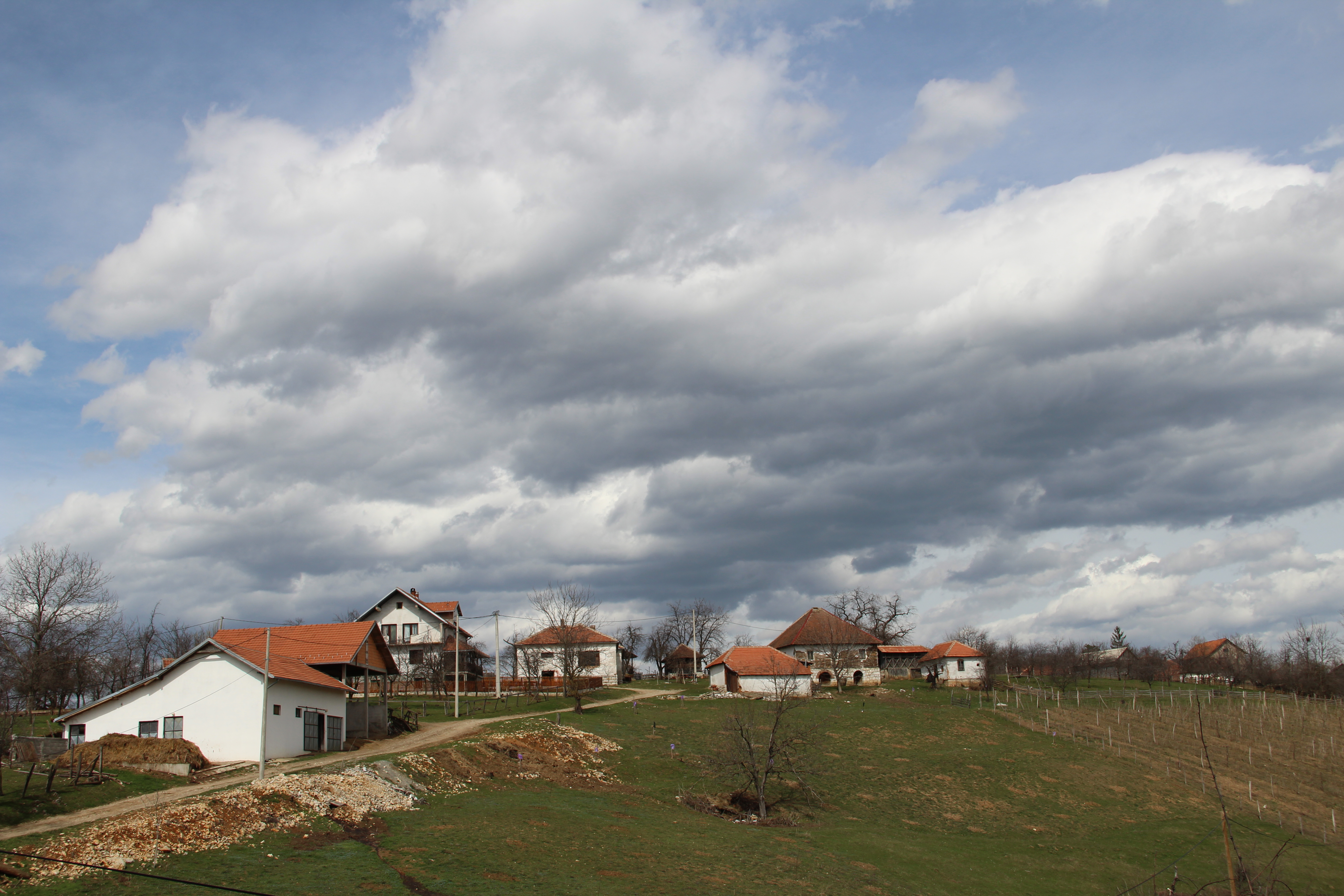
Lelic - Panorama

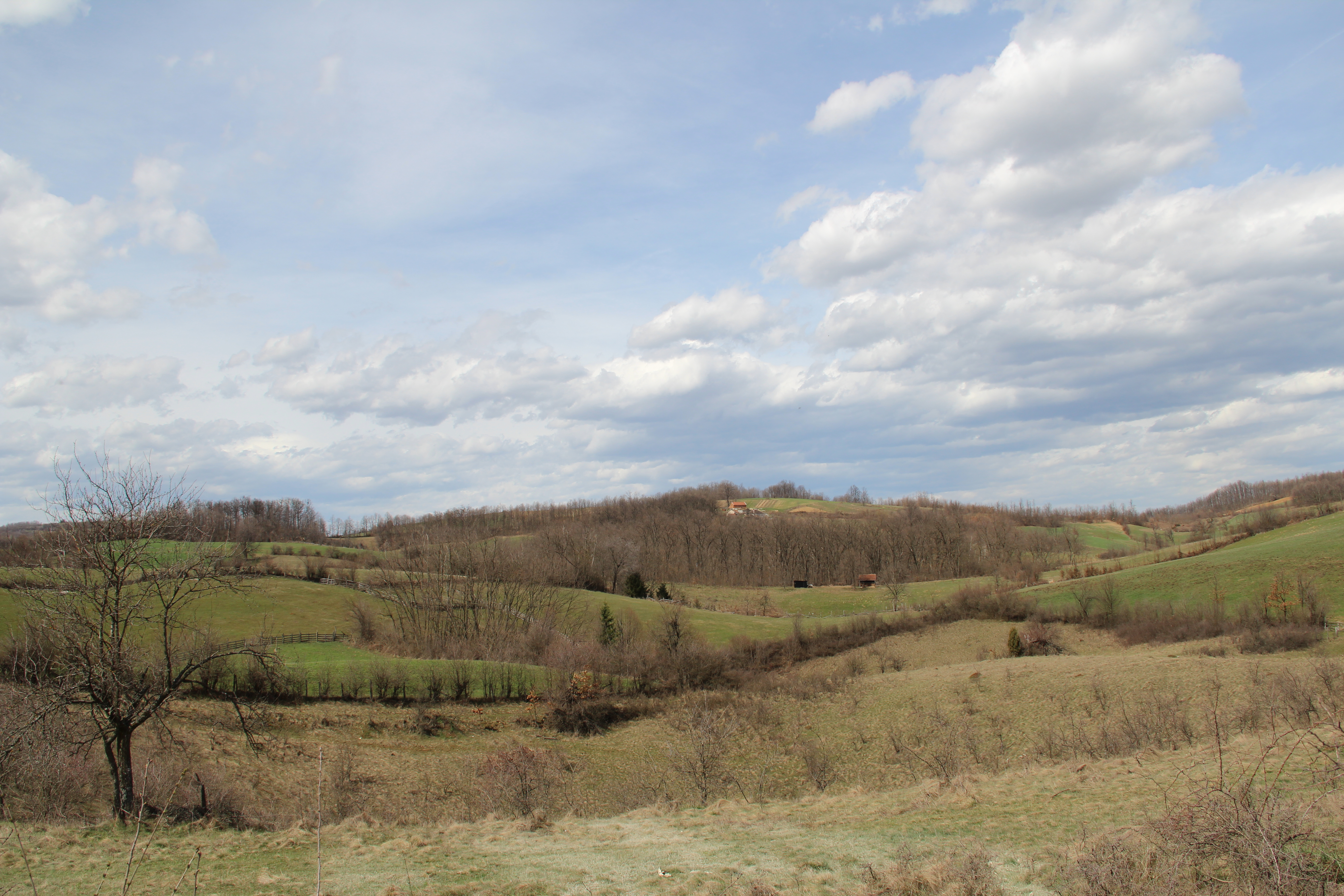
Lelic - Panorama

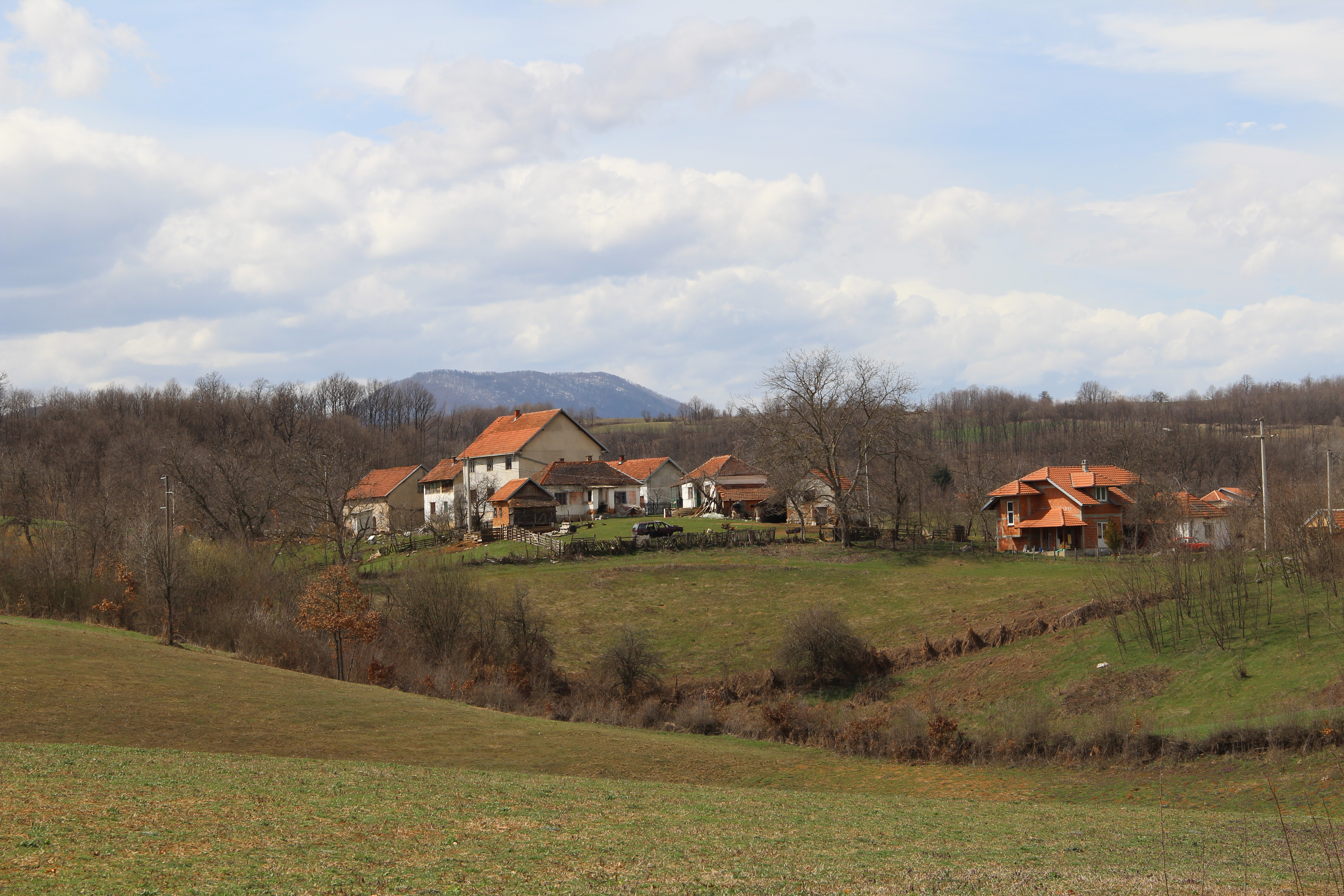
Lelic - Panorama

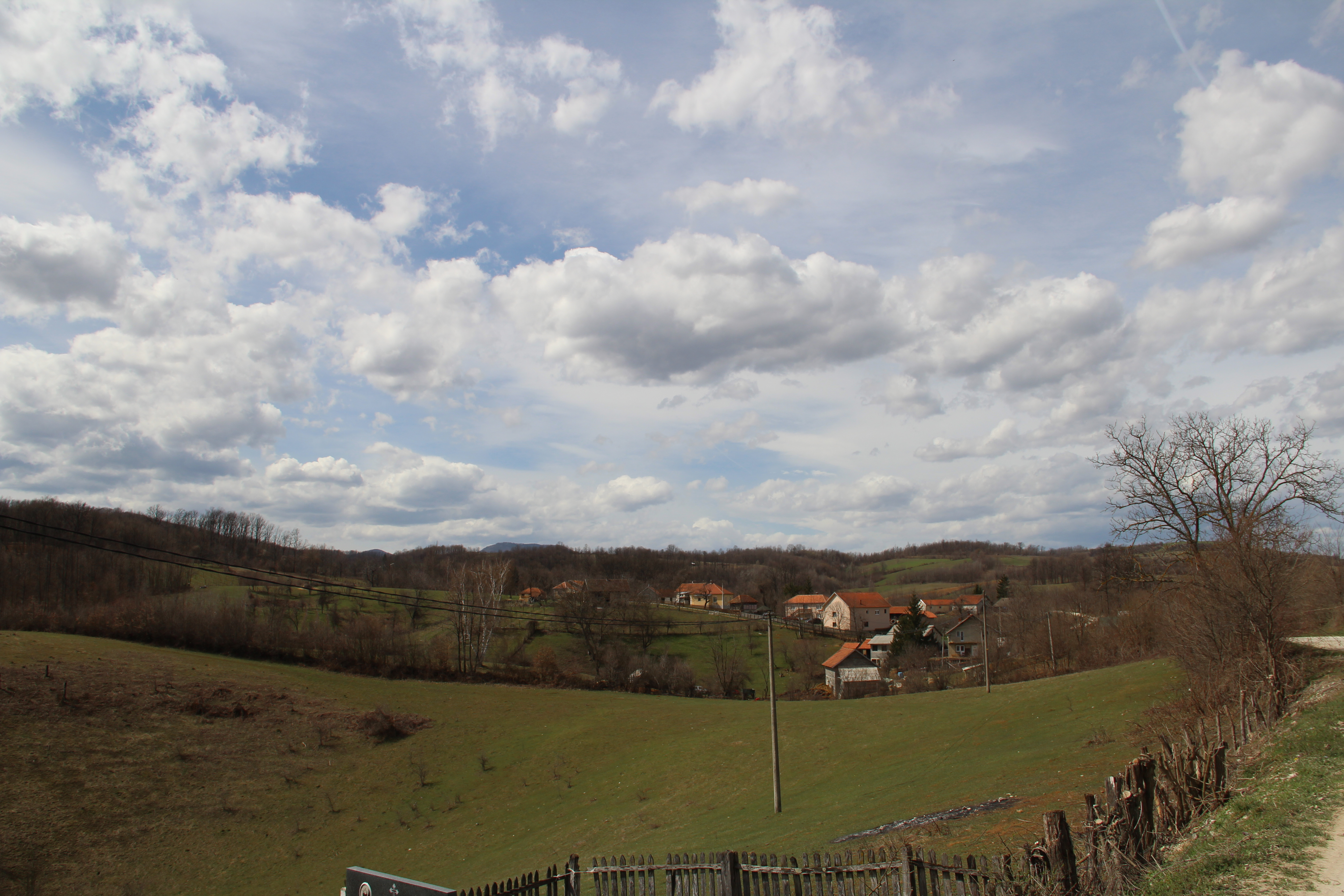
Lelic - Panorama

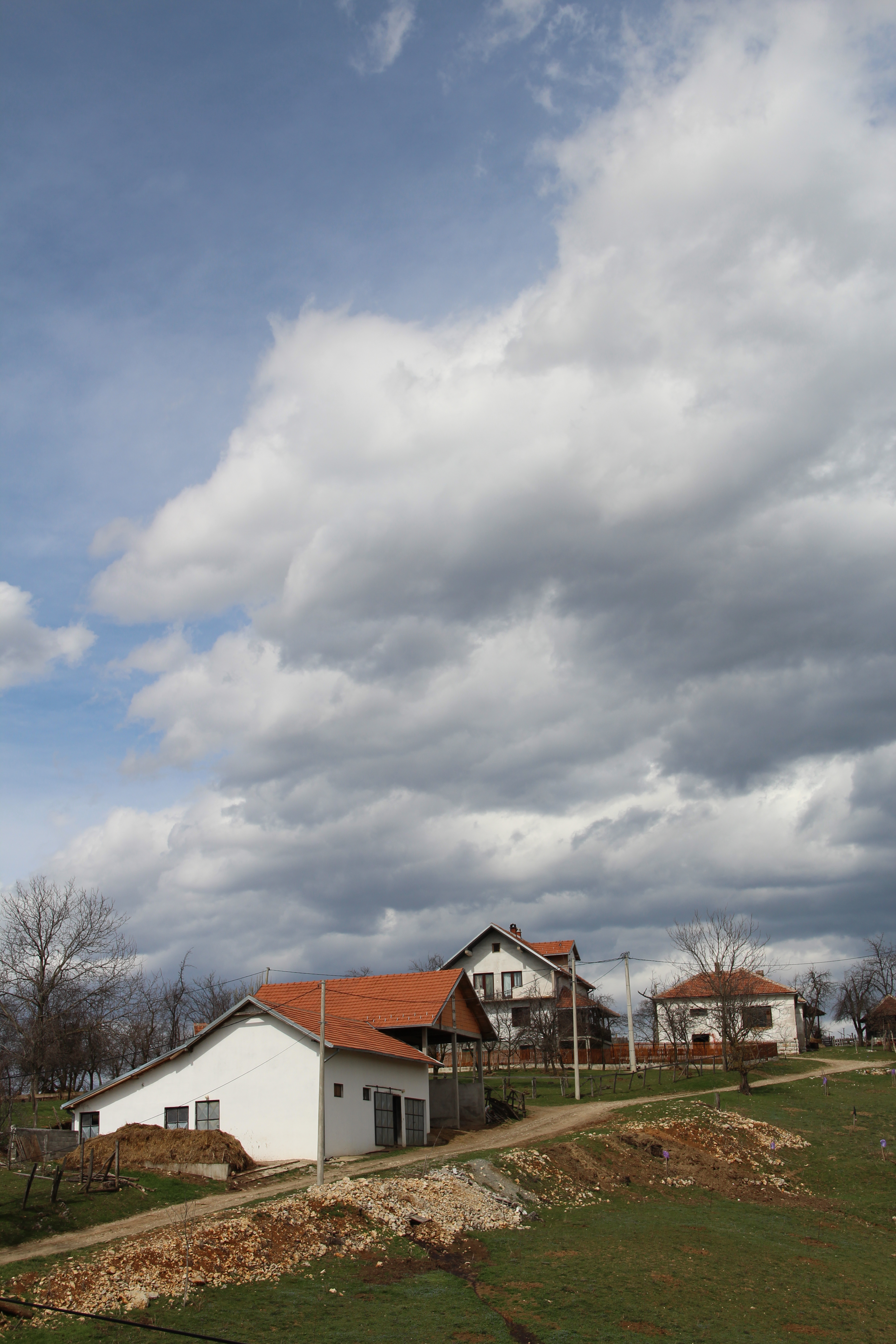
Lelic - Panorama

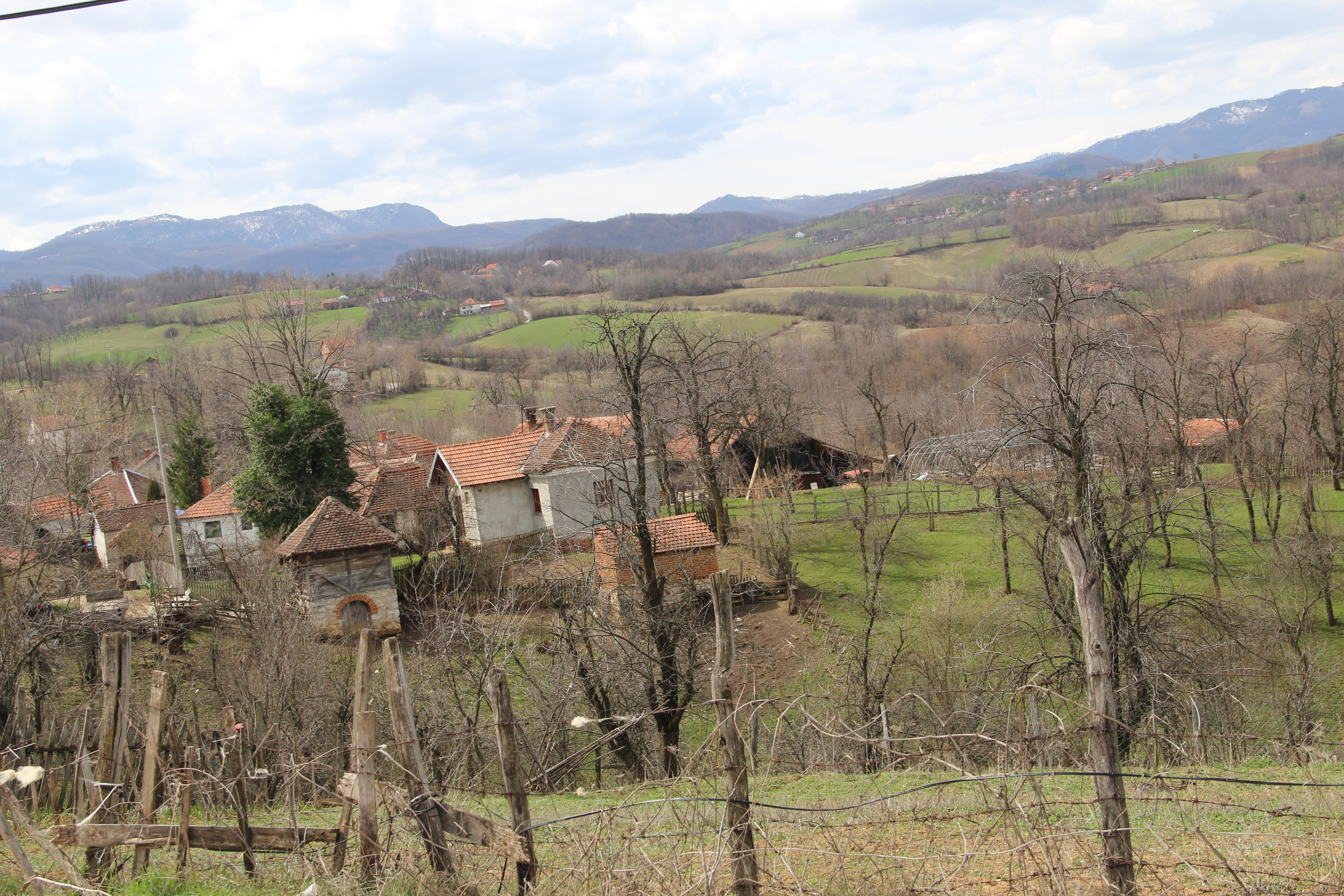
Lelic - Panorama

== Notable people ==
- Nikolaj Velimirović, Serbian Orthodox Bishop
- Artemije Radosavljević, Serbian Orthodox Bishop
- Danial Jahić, Serbian long jumper
