= Nikolaj Velimirović =

Serbian Orthodox bishop and saint (1880–1956)

Saint Nikolaj Velimirović Nikolaj of Ohrid and Žiča
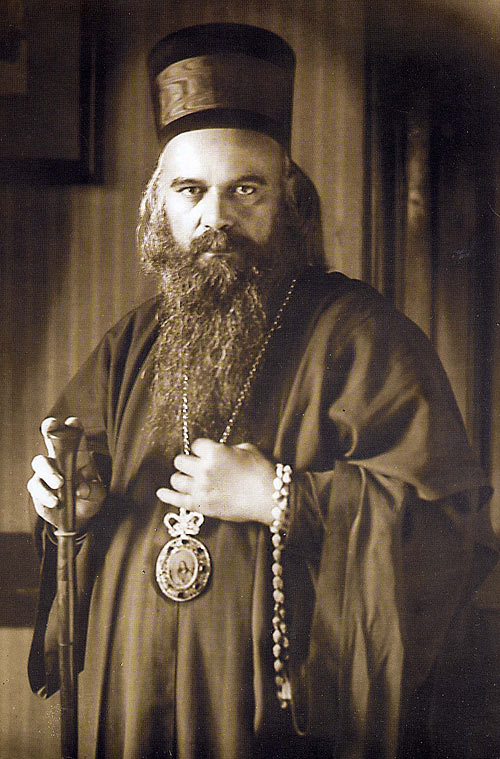

Venerable Bishop of Ohrid and Žiča the new Chrysostom
- Born: Nikola Velimirović; 4 January 1881; Lelić, Serbia
- Died: 18 March 1956 (aged 75); South Canaan, Pennsylvania, U.S.
- Venerated in: Eastern Orthodox Church
- Canonized: 24 May 2003 by Holy Synod of the Serbian Orthodox Church
- Major shrine: Lelić monastery, Serbia
- Feast: 3 May (O.S. 20 April)
- Attributes: Episcopal vestments

Nikolaj Velimirović (Serbian Cyrillic: Николај Велимировић; 4 January 1881 [O.S. 23 December 1880] – 18 March [O.S. 5 March] 1956) was a Serbian Orthodox prelate who served as Bishop of Ohrid and Žiča from 1920 to 1956. An influential theological writer and a gifted orator, he was often referred to as the "new John Chrysostom". According to a number of historians he is one of the most influential bishops of the Serbian Orthodox Church in the twentieth century.

As a young man, he came close to dying of dysentery and decided that he would dedicate his life to God if he survived. He lived and was tonsured as a monk under the name Nikolaj in 1909. He was ordained into the clergy, and quickly became an important leader and spokesman for the Serbian Orthodox Church, especially in its relations with the West. When Nazi Germany occupied Yugoslavia in World War II, Velimirović was imprisoned and eventually taken to Dachau concentration camp. After being released by Germans in December 1944, Velimirović spent time in Slovenia, where he blessed anti-communist volunteers such as Dimitrije Ljotić and other Nazi collaborators. After the war, he moved to the United States in 1946, where he remained until his death in 1956. He strongly supported the unity of all Eastern Orthodox churches and established particularly good relationships with the Anglican and Episcopal Churches.

Nikolaj is held in high regard in the Serbian Orthodox Church and among Serbian right-wing political elite. On 24 May 2003, he was glorified as a saint by the Holy Synod of the Serbian Orthodox Church as Saint Nikolaj of Ohrid and Žiča (Serbian: Свети Николај Охридски и Жички, romanized: Sveti Nikolaj Ohridski i Žički).

== Biography ==
=== Childhood ===
He was born as Nikola Velimirović in the small village of Lelić, Valjevo in the Principality of Serbia, on the day of the feast of Saint Naum of Ohrid, whose monastery would later be his episcopal see. He was the first of nine children born to Dragomir and Katarina Velimirović (née Filipović), pious farmers. Being very weak, he was baptised soon after his birth in the Ćelije monastery. He was given the name Nikola because Saint Nicholas was the family's patron saint. The first lessons about God, Jesus Christ, the lives of the saints and the holy days of the Church year were provided to him by his mother, who also regularly took him to the Ćelije monastery for prayer and Holy Communion.

=== Education ===
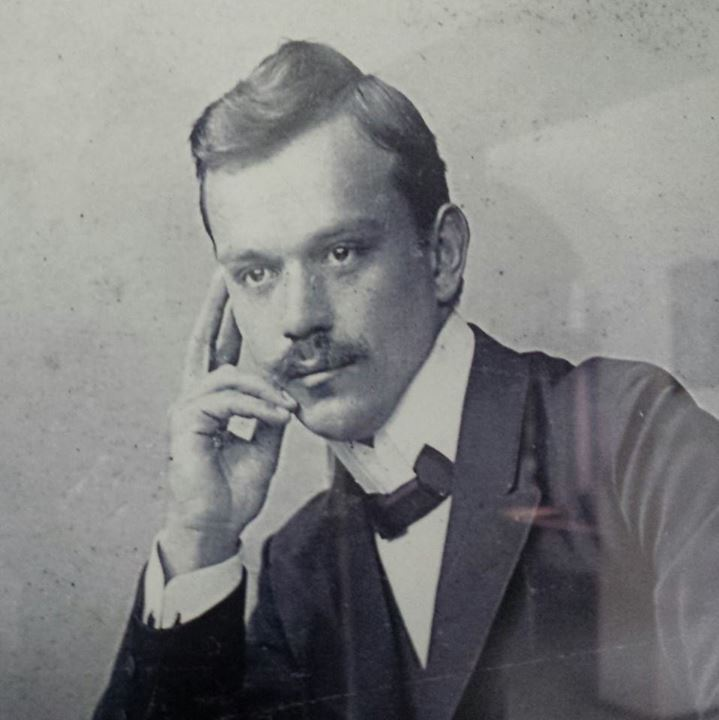
Velimirović as a student

His formal education also began in the Ćelije monastery and continued in Valjevo. He applied for admission into the Military Academy, but was refused because he didn't pass the physical exam. He was admitted to the Seminary of Saint Sava in Belgrade, where, apart from the standard subjects, he explored a significant number of writings of both Eastern and Western authors, such as Shakespeare, Voltaire, Nietzsche, Marx, Pushkin, Tolstoy, Dostoevsky, and others. He graduated in 1905.

Nikola had been chosen to become a professor in the Seminary of Saint Sava, but it was decided that he needed to pursue further Eastern Orthodox studies before becoming a teacher. As an outstanding student, he was chosen to continue his studies in Western Europe. He had a gift for languages and soon possessed a good knowledge of Russian, French and German. He went to Switzerland and obtained his doctorate of divinity from the Old Catholic Theological Faculty at the University of Berne with magna cum laude.

He received his doctorate in theology in 1908, with the dissertation entitled Faith in the Resurrection of Christ as the Foundation of the Dogmas of the Apostolic Church. This original work was written in German and published in Switzerland in 1910, and later translated into Serbian. During the stay in Switzerland, he completed a second thesis, The French-Slavonic Battles in the Bay of Kotor, a historical treatise on the battles between “Slavs” and Napoleon’s army in Boka Kotorska between 1806 and 1814. For this work he was awarded a second doctorate from the University in Bern in 1910.

Upon his return to Serbia, benefactor priest Aleksa Ilić loaned him money to continue studies in Britain, where he researched the philosophy of George Berkeley. Based on church publication reporting at the time, it has been alleged that he was based in Oxford where he was awarded a second doctorate there. This is an impossibility given that the honorary Doctorate of Divinity was awarded exclusively to Anglican clergy, and Oxford University did not award doctorates until 1917. Others claim that his work at Oxford formed the basis for a doctoral thesis which he later defended at the University of Geneva or the University of Halle in Germany, or that he had not been at Oxford at all, but at Cambridge. There is no evidence that Velimirović was ever registered at a British university or that he completed his study on Berkeley. It is most likely that he abandoned this project due to lack of income and returned early to Serbia.

His stay in Britain left an impact on his views and education, which is seen from the fact that he quotes or mentions Charles Dickens, Lord Byron, John Milton, Charles Darwin, Thomas Carlyle, Shakespeare and George Berkeley.

=== Monastic life ===
In the autumn of 1909, Nikolaj returned home and became seriously ill with dysentery. He decided that if he recovered he would become a monk and devote his life to God. At the end of 1909 his health got better and he was tonsured a monk, receiving the name Nikolaj. He was soon ordained a hieromonk and then elevated to the rank of Archimandrite. Shortly after his ordination, Nikolaj once again left Serbia. He was sent to study at the Theological Academy in St. Petersburg. He traveled around Russia, visited monasteries and other holy places and familiarized himself with Russian culture. The philosophical writings of Fyodor Dostoyevsky made a particular impression on him.

=== Missions during World War I ===
Shortly after the outbreak of World War I, in April 1915, he was appointed by the Serbian government to a mission in the United States. As an unknown Serbian monk, he toured and lectured in major U.S. cities, fighting for the union of the Serbs and South Slavic peoples. During Velimirović's US-campaign occurred the great retreat of the Serbian Army through the mountains of Albania. He embarked home in 1916; as his country was now in enemy hands, he went to Britain instead. Not only did he fulfill his mission, but he was also awarded a Doctorate of Divinity honoris causa from the University of Cambridge.

He gave a series of notable lectures at St. Margaret's, Westminster, and preached in St. Paul's Cathedral, making him the first Eastern Orthodox Christian to preach at St Paul's. Professor at the Faculty of Orthodox Theology Bogdan Lubardić has identified three phases in the development of Velimirović's ideas: the pre-Ohrid phase (1902–1919), the Ohrid phase (1920–1936), and the post-Ohrid phase (1936–1956).

=== Bishop ===
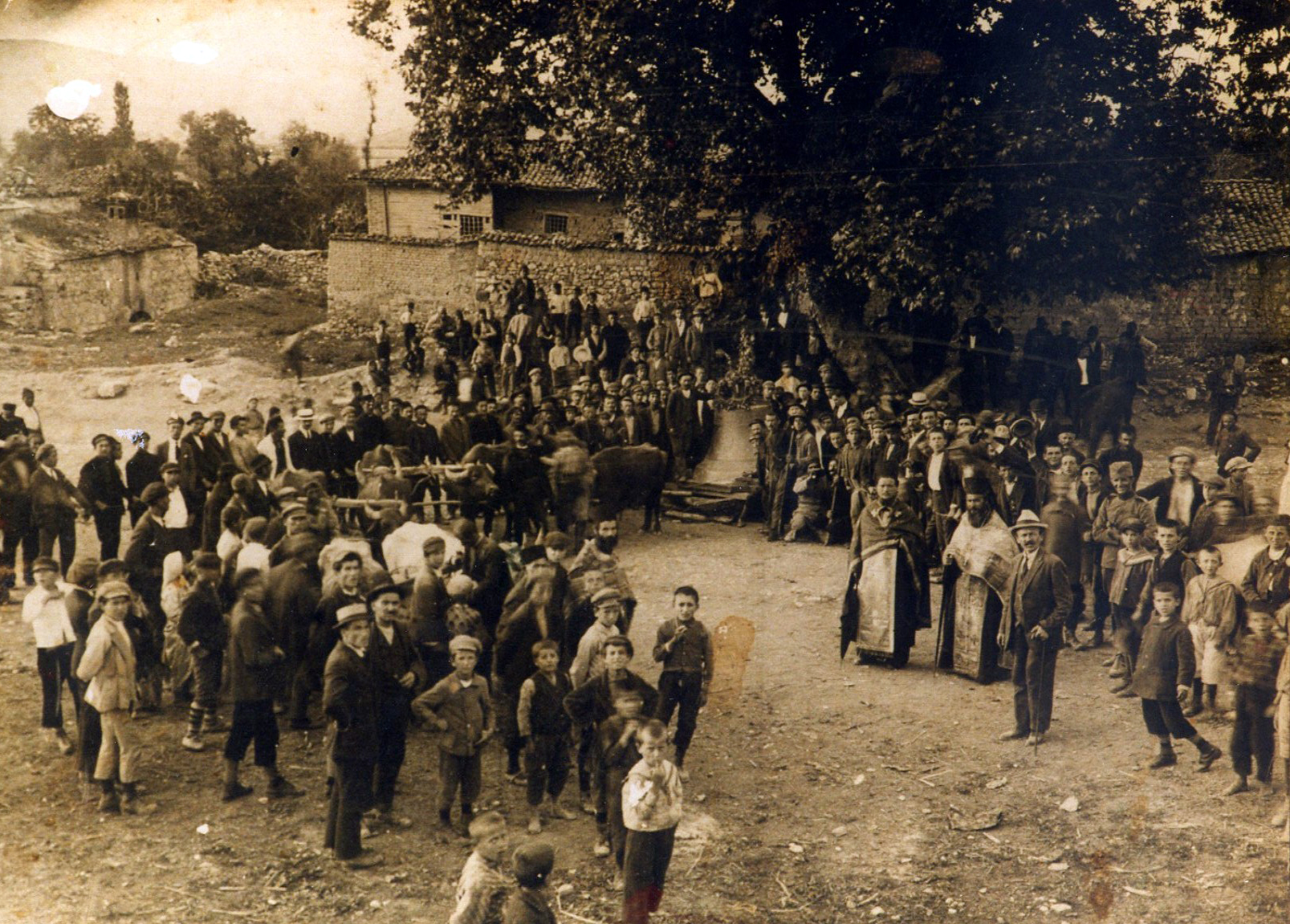
Photo of carrying the bell for the church St. Kliment in Ohrid in 1924, a gift from Mihajlo Pupin

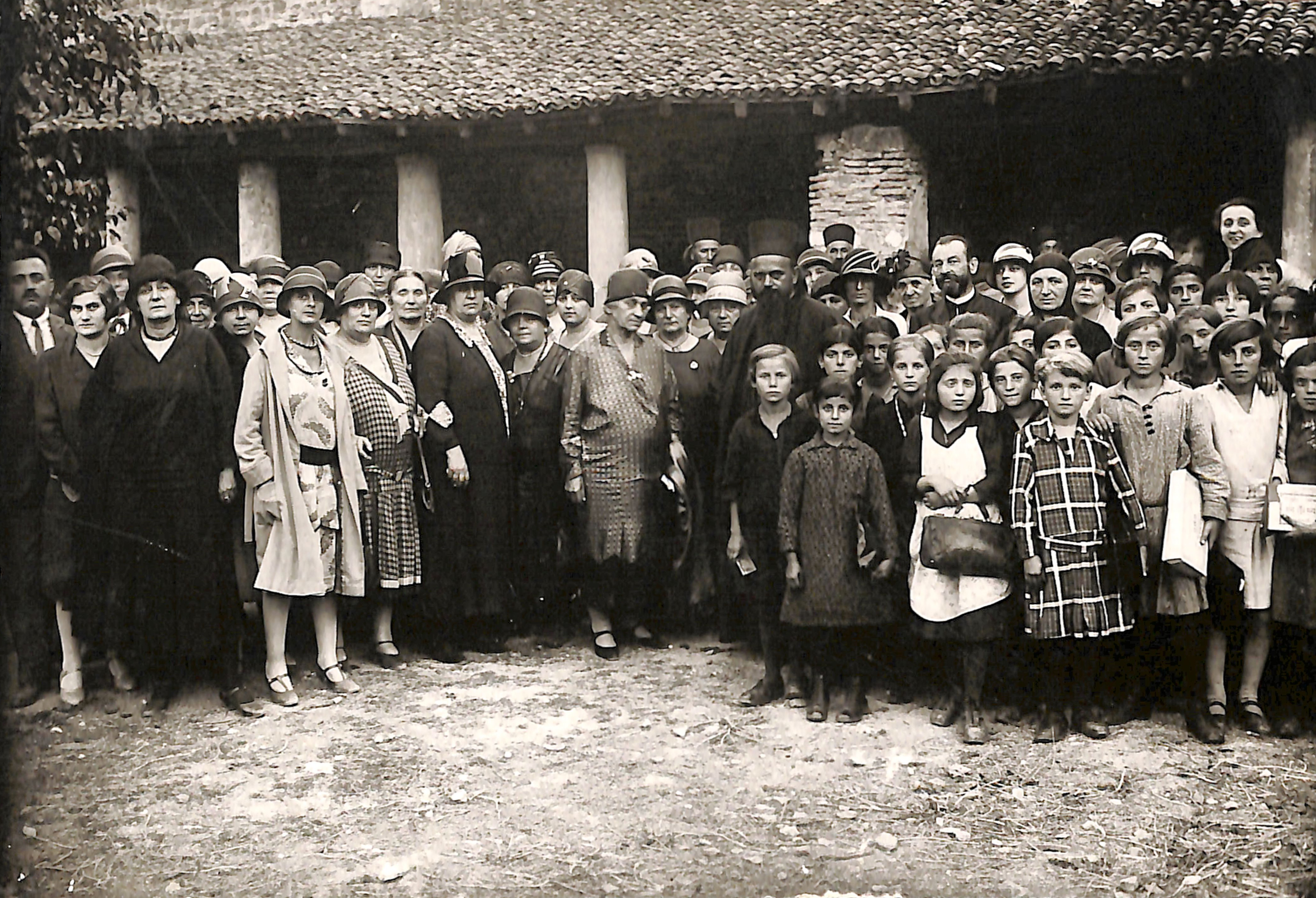
Bishop Nikolaj Velimirović in Ohrid with the company of Princess Ljubica in 1928

In 1919, Archimandrite Nikolaj was consecrated Bishop of Žiča but did not remain long in that diocese, being asked to take over the office of Bishop in the Eparchy of Ohrid (1920–1931) and Eparchy of Ohrid and Bitola (1931–1936) in southern parts of Kingdom of Yugoslavia.

He wrote an article for The Times, presenting the martyrdom of the Serbian clergy in the First World War. He states that according to official data "the Bulgarian authorities have massacred no fewer than 148 priests in Eastern Serbia during the period of their occupation in winter 1914". Among the victims of "Bulgarian savagery" was the Archbishop of Skopje Vićentije Krdžić. Many younger clerics were deported to Bulgaria "to work on the road as manual labourers", and only a few of them survived "the terrible ordeal". The Austrian authorities deported "no fewer than 400 priests to their internment camps in Austria". Many of them "succumbed to cold and hunger", and those who survived and returned home "have fallen victims to tuberculosis and rheumatism". Velimović concludes that "probably no part of the Christian Universal Church has lost so much in lives and goods as the Church of Serbia", because the Serbian clergy was "considered as the incarnation of Yugo-Slav ideal of national liberation" and was "the most vital opposition in the policy of denationalization of Serbs".

In 1920, he journeyed again to the United States for the third time, on a mission to organise the Serbian Orthodox Diocese of North America. He made another trip to the United States in 1927.

German Chancellor Adolf Hitler awarded him with a civil medal in 1935 for his contribution in 1926 to the renovation of the German military cemetery in Bitola. In 1936, he finally resumed his original office of Bishop in the Eparchy of Žiča, returning to the Monastery of Žiča not far from Valjevo and Lelić, where he was born.

During the Concordate Crisis, Velimirović was a leading figure against the adoption of the Concordate by the Yugoslav assembly and one of the organisers of the protest liturgy in 1937. He wrote to the Serb parliamentarians that the Concordate "gives enormous rights and privileges to an international organisation at the expense of our national Saint Sava's Church". In a sermon held on 26 September 1937, he stated:

"Down with all antinational elements: parasites and bloodsuckers, capitalists, godless, and communists! ... Serbian national consciousness is awakened because it resists attacks from all internationalists and those who build bridges for the Pope in Rome and his Church–the oldest international, the oldest fascism, the oldest dictatorship in Europe!

=== Detention and imprisonment in World War II ===
During World War II, in 1941, as soon as the German forces occupied Yugoslavia, Bishop Nikolaj was arrested by the Nazis in the Monastery of Žiča after the suspicion of contributing to the resistance. After which he was confined in the Monastery of Ljubostinja. Later he was transferred to the Monastery of Vojlovica (near Pančevo) in which he was confined together with the Serbian Patriarch Gavrilo V. On 15 September 1944, both Patriarch Gavrilo V (Dožić) and Bishop Nikolaj were sent to Dachau concentration camp, which was at that time the main concentration camp for clerics arrested by the Nazis. Both Velimirović and Dožić were held as special prisoners (Ehrenhäftlinge) imprisoned in the so-called Ehrenbunker (or Prominentenbunker) separated from the work camp area, together with high-ranking Nazi enemy officers and other prominent prisoners whose arrests had been dictated by Hitler directly.

In August 1943 German general Hermann Neubacher became special emissary of the German Foreign Office for Southeastern Europe. From 11 September 1943, he was also made responsible for Albania. In December 1944 as part of a settlement of Neubacher with Milan Nedić and Dimitrije Ljotić Germans were release Velimirović and Dožić who were transferred from Dachau to Slovenia, as the Nazis attempted to make use of Patriarch Gavrilo's and Nikolaj's authority among the Serbs in order to gain allies in the anti-Communist movements. Contrary to claims of torture and abuse at the camp, Patriarch Dožić testified himself that both he and Velimirović were treated normally. During his stay in Slovenia, Velimirović blessed volunteers of Dimitrije Ljotić and other collaborators and war criminals such as Dobroslav Jevđević and Momčilo Đujić.

Later, Velimirović and Patriarch Gavrilo (Dožić) were moved to Austria, and were finally liberated by the US 36th Infantry Division in Tyrol in 1945.

=== Immigration and Last Years ===
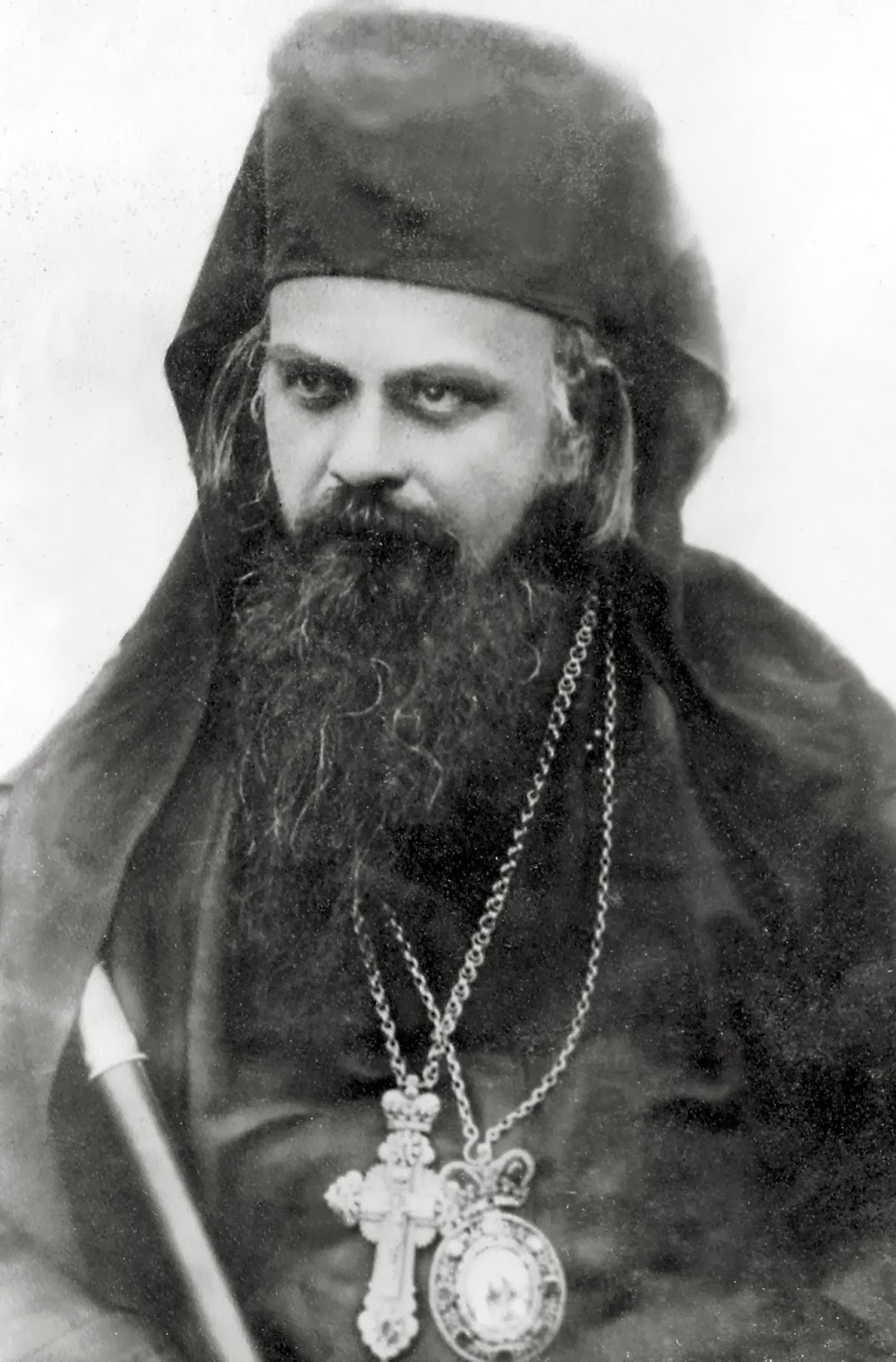
Photo of St. Nikolaj

After the war he never returned to the Socialist Federal Republic of Yugoslavia, but after spending some time in Europe, he finally immigrated as a refugee to the United States in 1946. There, in spite of his health problems, he continued his missionary work, for which he is considered An Apostle and Missionary of the New Continent (quote by Fr. Alexander Schmemann), and has also been enlisted as an American Saint and included on the icons and frescoes All American Saints.

His books were banned by the Yugoslav communist government in 1947.

He taught at several Eastern Orthodox seminaries such as St. Sava's Seminary (Libertyville, Illinois), Saint Tikhon's Orthodox Theological Seminary and Monastery (South Canaan, Pennsylvania), and St. Vladimir's Orthodox Theological Seminary (now in Crestwood, New York).

Velimirović died on 18 March 1956, while in prayer at the foot of his bed before the Liturgy, at St Tikhon's Russian Orthodox Theological Seminary in South Canaan Township, Wayne County, Pennsylvania, where a shrine is established in his room. He was buried near the tomb of poet Jovan Dučić at the Monastery of St. Sava at Libertyville, Illinois.

After the Fall of communism, his remains were re-buried in his home town of Lelić on 12 May 1991, next to his parents and his nephew, Bishop Jovan Velimirović. On 19 May 2003, the Holy Assembly of Bishops of the Serbian Orthodox Church recognized Bishop Nikolaj (Velimirović) of Ohrid and Žiča as a saint and decided to include him into the calendar of saints of Holy Orthodox Church (5 and 18 March).

== Literary criticism ==
Amfilohije Radović points out that part of his success lies in his high education and ability to write well and his understanding of European culture.

Literary critic Milan Bogdanović claims that everything Velimirović wrote after his Ohrid years did nothing more than paraphrase Eastern Orthodox canon and dogma. Bogdanović views him as a conservative who glorified the Church and its ceremonies as an institution. Others say he brought little novelty into Eastern Orthodox thought. This, however, is explained by true Orthodox thought, because, as Saint John of Damascus writes, "It is for that reason that I say (teach) nothing of what is mine. I briefly express the thoughts and words passed down by Godly and wise men."

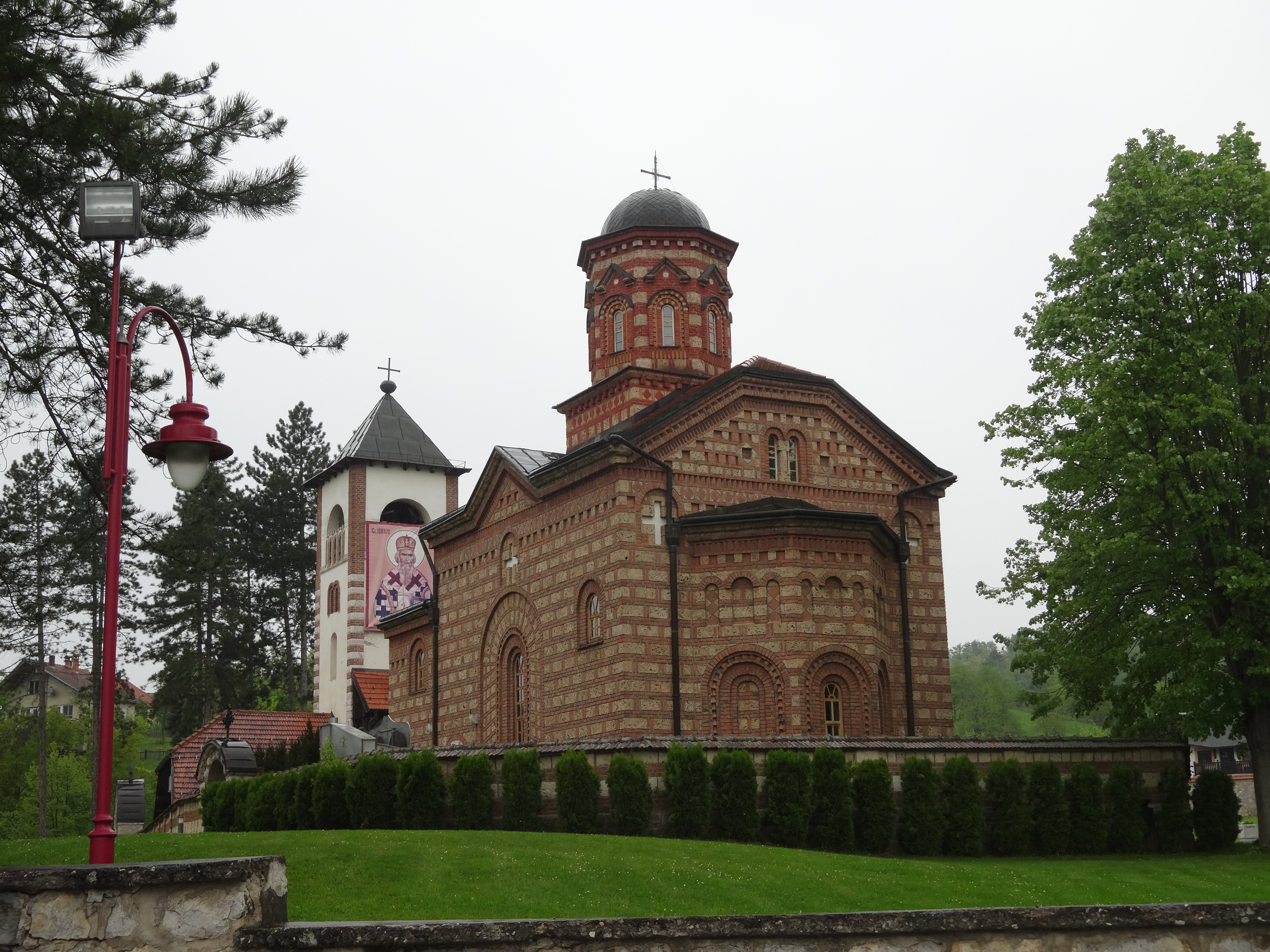
Lelić monastery was founded by Nikolaj

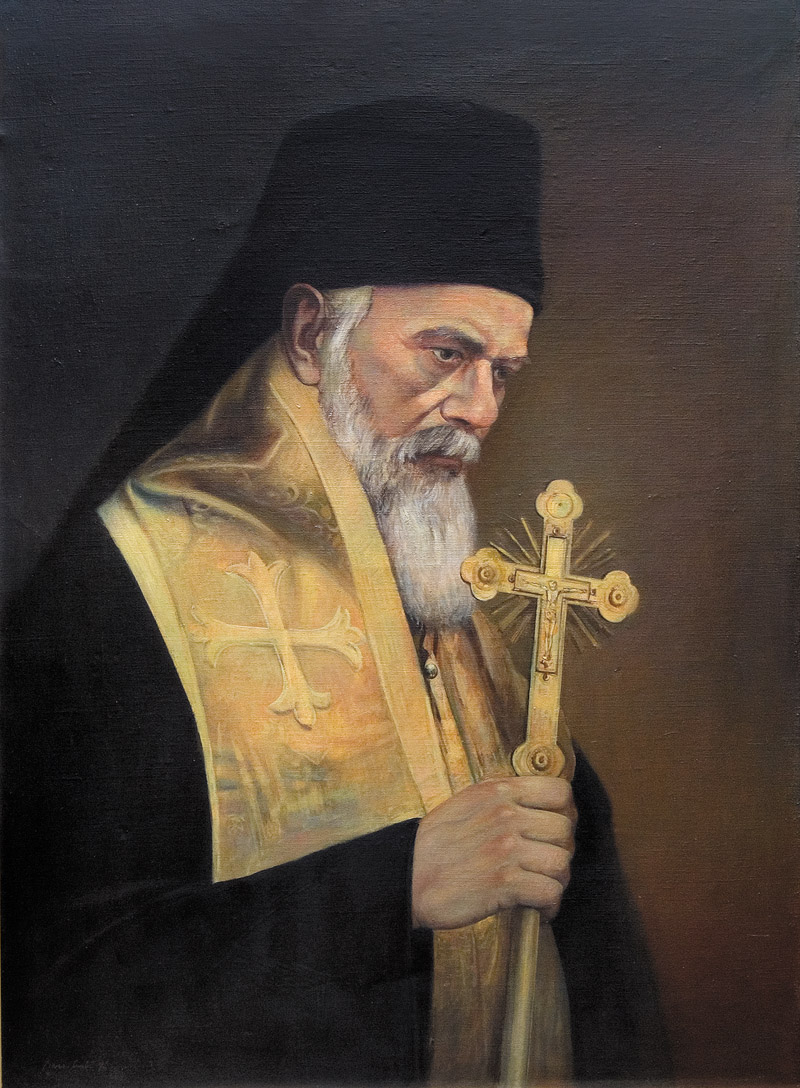
Painting of bishop Nikolaj by Ljubomir Simonović

== Views ==
=== Nationalism of Saint Sava ===
In 1935, Nikolaj held a speech on the "nationalism of Saint Sava", in which he analyzed the writings of Saint Sava. Saint-savian nationalism is a theological and political term that St. Nikolaj uses to describe Serbian Orthodox Christian nationalism. It blended anti-liberalism, anti-materialism, anti-secularism, anti-Catholicism and anti-Islam. According to Velimirović, it includes the national church, where the base of nationalism lies, national dynasty, national state, national education, national culture and national defense.

In his speech, Velimirović theorized that the nationalism of Saint Sava was against racism and hatred, pointing to the welcoming and equal treatment of colonial African and Asian soldiers by Serbs during World War I. He also stated that the three greatest values of the Serbian people are: God, King and Home. Nikolaj constructs the nationalism of Saint Sava as an evangelical platform that should serve as a model for the establishment of the national church. This nationalism, unlike nationalism that originates from the Enlightenment and secular tradition, is based on faith as a basic principle. According to Nikolaj, the nationalism of Saint Sava is firstly, evangelical, because it protects the integrity of the human person and helps its perfection, and secondly, organic, because it protects the individuality of the peoples themselves, preventing them from falling into imperialism and disintegrating into internationalism. By being established on holiness as the highest personal and ecclesiastical ideal, such evangelical nationalism, according to Nikolaj, becomes a barrier to chauvinism and exclusivity toward other nations. According to this Saint-Savian nationalism promoted by Nikolaj, all peoples on earth, regardless of blood, language and religion, are the people of God and brothers among themselves.

In his writings from the mid-1930s, Nikolaj pointed to the political deviations of good nationalism. In his article “Between Left and Right” from 1935, Nikolaj criticizes internationalism and fascism, the two most powerful movements and political orders in Europe at that time. Internationalism for Nikolaj was the negation of nation and national determination, while fascism was idolatry of one's own nation.

=== Views on Mihailović's Chetniks ===
Saint Nikolaj Velimirović and Saint Justin Popović both supported the Chetniks of Mihailović. Velimirović wrote a book called "The land of the dead" in which he expressed support for the Chetnik fight against National Socialist Germany. He held a speech on 18 July 1954 about Draža and his "Saint-savian fight".

=== Allegations of antisemitism ===
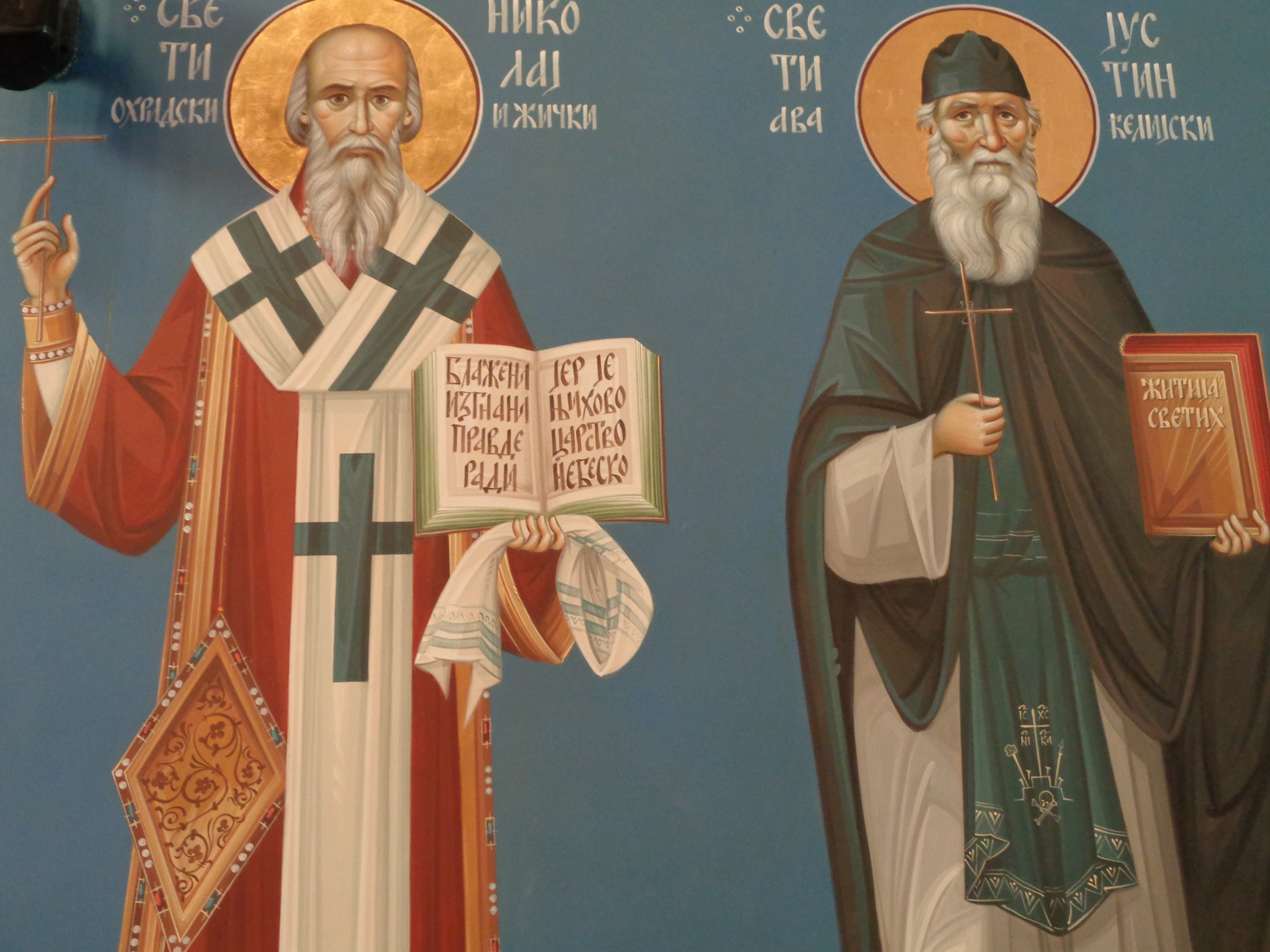
Frescoes of Nikolaj Velimirović and Justin Popović, Vavedenje Monastery

Several of Nikolaj Velimirović's writings and public speeches have been identified by historians as containing antisemitic rhetoric and/or hate speech directed at Jews. Notably, the first written record of Velimirović's antisemitic beliefs comes over a decade before the start of World War II. In fact, the first chronicled case of Velimirović expressing antisemitic beliefs dates back to a 1927 sermon delivered in the United States. From the 1927 sermon titled "A Story about the Wolf and the Lamb," Velimirović's proclamations are summarized by social psychologist Jovan Byford:

In his take on the well known Christian parable about the wolf and the lamb, Velimirović referred to "Jewish leaders in Jerusalem" at the time of the crucifixion as "wolves," whose thirst for blood of the Lamb of God was motivated by their "God-hating nationalism."

Byford's summary of Velimirović's "A Story about the Wolf and the Lamb" is significant for it serves as evidence that Velimirović may have utilized biblical undertones and Christian parable as a means of 'validating' his antisemitic statements to his followers. An interview that Jovan Byford conducted with Mladen Obradović (leader of Serbian far-right political organization Obraz) may suggest that this explanation still persists among some members of Serbian Orthodox society. A contemporary defender of Velimirović's reputation and saint status, Obradović defends the antisemitic writings of Velimimirović by stating that Velimirović's words only echo what had been written in early Christian texts:

You have the very words of the Lord Jesus Christ when he says to the Pharisees that they are a "brood of vipers" or that their father is the Devil; Bishop Nikolaj merely quotes the Gospels.

In a speech delivered in 1936 at the Žiča Monastery, Velimirović spoke out against what he perceived to be a Jewish threat to Christianity in front of a distinguished audience that included Yugoslavian Prime Minister Milan Stojadinović. Velimirović used specific lines of this speech to accuse Jews of leading a secretive, coordinated effort against Christianity and "faith in real God".

Velimirović's writing in Words to the Serbian People Through the Prison Window is generally seen as the strongest evidence of the Bishop holding antisemitic beliefs. Notably, many proponents of Velimirović's ideology suggest that the work is not definitive evidence of the Bishop's true ideology and beliefs about Jews and Judaism because they claim that it was written under duress during his time at Dachau. The excerpts from Velimirović's Words to the Serbian People Through the Prison Window that attract the most attention from scholars studying antisemitism are quoted in Byford as follows:

The Devil teaches them [Jews]; the Devil taught them how to stand against the son of God, Jesus Christ. The Devil taught them through the centuries how to fight against the sons of Christ, against the children of light, against the followers of the Gospel and eternal life [Christians]. [...] Europe knows nothing other than what Jews serve up as knowledge. It believes nothing other than what Jews order it to believe. It knows the value of nothing until Jews impose their own measure of values […] all modern ideas including democracy, and strikes, and socialism, and atheism, and religious tolerance, and pacifism, and global revolution, and capitalism, and communism are the inventions of Jews, or rather their father, the Devil.

Additionally, Byford identifies the antisemitic ideology of Velimirović in the work, Indian Letters in which the figure of a Jewish woman portrays Satan. Notably, this example of Velimirović's antisemitic portrayal is again linked to conspiracy as Velimirović describes the woman as standing for, "all destructive and secret associations plotting against Christianity, religion, and the state."

Despite Velimirović's antisemitic beliefs, it is recorded that Velimirović protected a Jewish family by facilitating their escape from Nazi-occupied Serbia. Ela Trifunović (Ela Nayhaus), wrote to the Serbian Orthodox Church in 2001, claiming that she had spent 18 months hiding in the Ljubostinja monastery to which she was smuggled by Velimirović, guarded and later helped move on with false papers.

=== Views on Germans and Hitler ===
Adolf Hitler decorated Nikolaj Velimirović in 1935 for his contributions to the restoration of a German military cemetery in Bitola in 1926. Some claim that the order was returned in protest at German aggression in 1941. In a treatise on St. Sava's day in 1935, he supported Hitler's treatment of the German national church. St Nikolaj later explained himself in a letter to the American-Canadian bishop Dionysius, where he stated:

"I gave a lecture at Kolarch University on the nationalism of St. Sava, in the year of Saint Sava, which was 1935, and anyone who doesn't know that would think that I mentioned the leader of the [German] people during the war. In this last case, why would the Germans arrest me from the first days - until the last? I glorified St. Sava, not Hitler. I said that St. Sava, as a saint, genius and hero of the Serbian people, created the Serbian national church 700 years ago, and united all the Serbian people in that church. A work that has not been repeated anywhere in the West. Pascal tried in the 16th century to create a national Gallican church for the French, but failed.

St. Nikolaj criticized the secularization of Germany, called the ideology of fascism the “European evil,” and referred to Hitler as the “Viennese painter” and “Satanic evil.”

In spite of accusations of collaboration leveled during Communist times, some of Velimirović's actions and writings were directed against the Germans who got suspicious of him when he supported the coup in April 1941. They suspected him of collaborating with the Chetniks and formally arrested him and kept him first in Ljubostinja Monastery in 1941 and then in 1944 in Dachau concentration camp. In Dachau, he was imprisoned in Ehrenbunker, together with other clergy and high-ranking Nazi enemy officers, and was allowed to wear his own religious clothes, having access to the officer's canteen. It is claimed that he was never tortured and had access to officers' medical services. Contrary to the reports that Velimirović was liberated when the American 36th Infantry Division reached Dachau, both he and Patriarch Dožić were actually released in November 1944, having spent three months in the camp. They travelled to Slovenia, from where Velimirović continued first to Austria then to United States.

=== Views on Ljotić ===
Velimirović had a high opinion of Dimitrije Ljotić, a Serbian fascist politician and German collaborationist. However, he never supported him politically. There were many examples in Velimirović's letters written during the 1950s, in which he wanted to distance himself from the actions of the Ljotić's pro-fascist movement Zbor in the emigration, which he labelled as “national godlessness” in order to differentiate it from the communist godlessness. Velimirović's sympathies for religiosity of Dimitrije Ljotić, the leader of Zbor movement, encouraged Ljotić's adherents to interpret Velimirović's words as the support for Zbor's political goals, not only after World War One, but also in the interwar period. On several occasions, Velimirović himself tried to prevent Ljotić's political adherents to usurp and exploit the publishing house “Svečanik” in Munich founded by Velimirović for their political goals. Therefore, it would not be difficult to imagine that some of them forged Velimirović's writings by interpolating the political agenda of the Zbor movement.

== Legacy ==
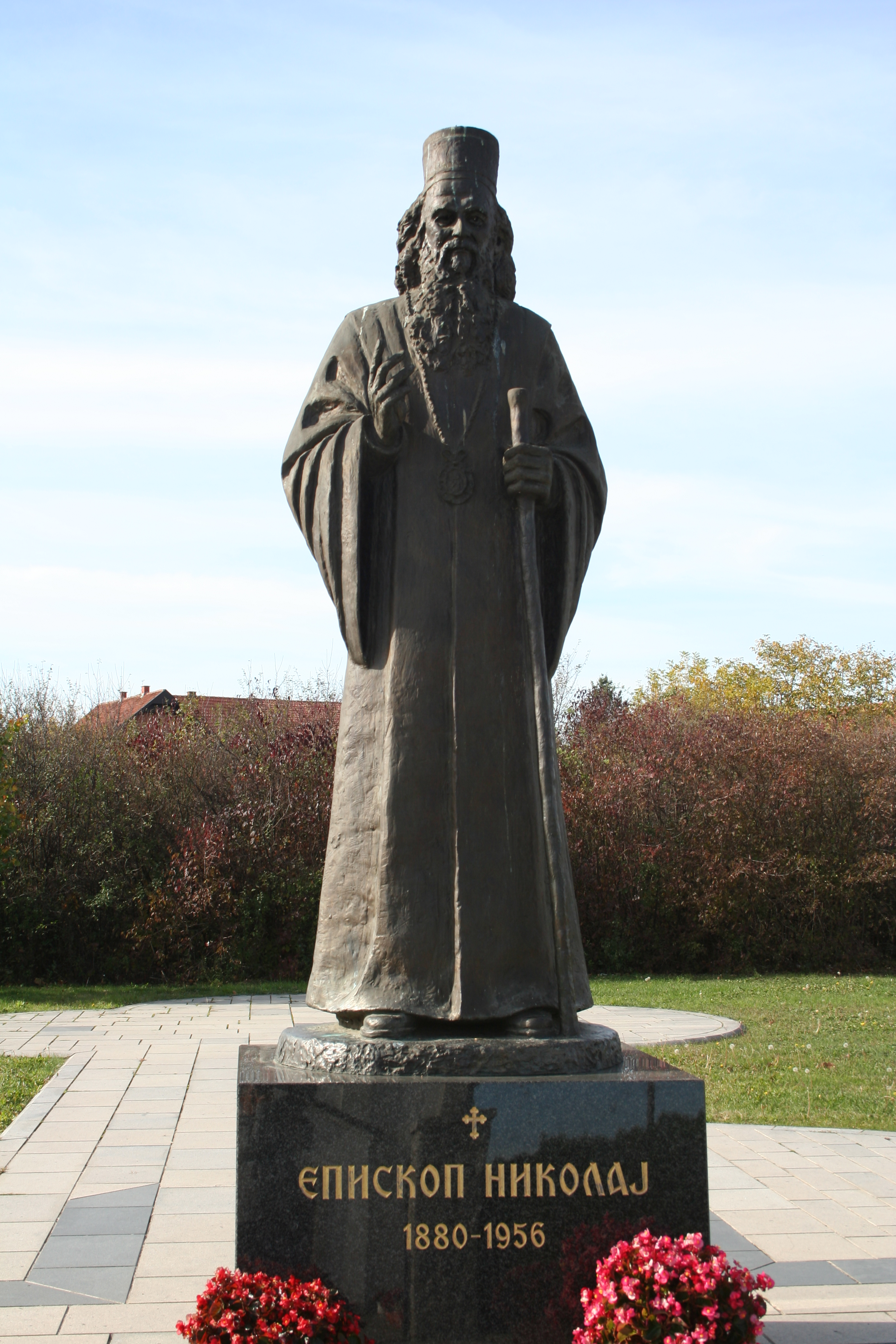
Monument in Valjevo

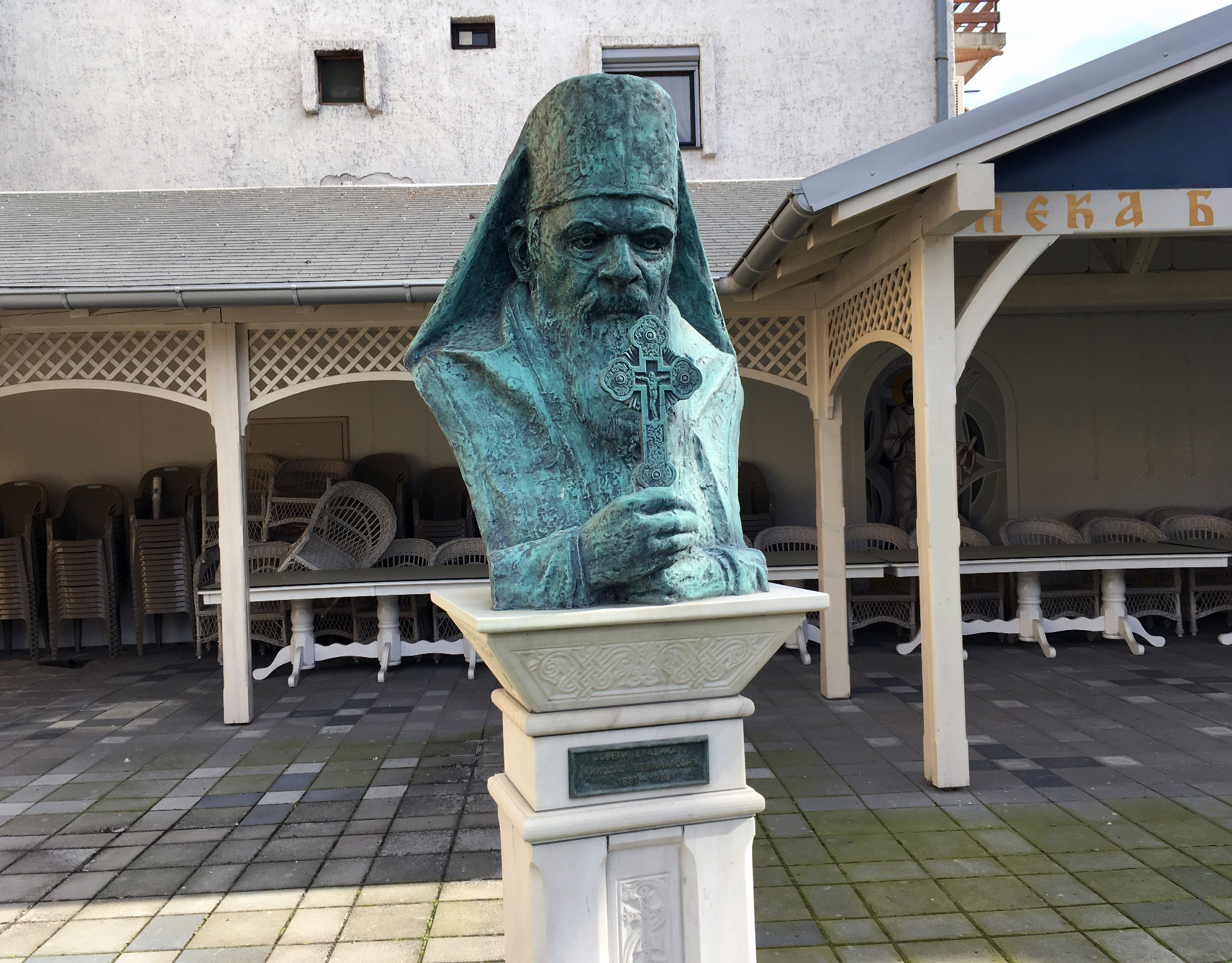
Monument in Šabac

A monastery is named after him in China Township, Michigan called Serbian Orthodox Monastery of Saint Nikolaj Bishop of Žiča

Porfirije, Serbian Patriarch stated that he is one of the three most notable Serb theologians to be recognized internationally. Velimirović is included in the book The 100 most prominent Serbs. In 2023 in Belgrade, on Ascension Day, the city's patronal feast, his relics were carried in front of a procession attended by more than 100,000 people, making it the largest procession in the history of Belgrade.

== Selected works ==
- Моје успомене из Боке (1904) (My memories from Boka)
- Französisch-slavische Kämpfe in der Bocca di Cattaro (1910)
- Beyond Sin and Death (1914)
- Christianity and War: Letters of a Serbian to His English Friend (New York, 1915)
- The New Ideal in Education (1916)
- The Religious Spirit of the Slavs (1916)
- The Spiritual Rebirth of Europe (1917)
- Orations on the Universal Man (1920)
- Молитве на језеру (1922)
- Thoughts on Good and Evil (1923)
- Homilias, volumes I and II (1925)
- Читанка о Светоме краљу Јовану Владимиру
- The Prologue from Ohrid (1926)
- The Faith of Educated People (1928)
- The War and the Bible (1931)
- The Symbols and Signs (1932)
- The Chinese Martyrs by Saint Nikolai Velimirovich (Little Missionary, 1934 — 1938)
- Emmanuel (1937)
- Теодул (1942)
- The Faith of the Saints (1949) (an Eastern Orthodox Catechism in English)
- The Life of Saint Sava (Zivot Sv. Save, 1951 original Serbian language version)
- Cassiana - the Science on Love (1952)
- The Only Love of Mankind (1958) (posthumously)
- The First Gods Law and the Pyramid of Paradise (1959) (posthumously)
- The Religion of Njegos (?)
- Speeches under the Mount (?)
- Vera svetih (?) (Faith of the holy)
- Indijska pisma (?) (Letters from India)
- Iznad istoka i zapada (?) (Above east and west)
- izabrana dela svetog Nikolaja Velimirovića (?) (Selected works of saint Nikolaj Velimirović)
- The Life of St. Sava (St. Vladimir's Seminary Press, 2013) ISBN 9780881410655
- Prayers by the Lake (2018) ISBN 9781718114272

== Sources ==
- Byford, J.T. (2004). Canonisation of Bishop Nikolaj Velimirović and the legitimisation of religious anti-Semitism in contemporary Serbian society. East European Perspectives, 6 (3)
- Byford, J.T. (2004). From ‘Traitor’ to ‘Saint’ in Public Memory: The Case of Serbian Bishop Nikolaj Velimirović. Analysis of Current Trends in Antisemitism series (ACTA), No.22.
- Byford, J.T. "Canonizing the 'Prophet' of antisemitism: the apotheosis of bishop Nikolaj Velimirović and the legitimation of religious anti-semitism in contemporary Serbian society", RFE/RL Report, 18 February 2004, Volume 6, Number 4
- Byford, Jovan (2005). Potiskivanje i poricanje antisemitizma : sećanje na vladiku Nikolaja Velimirovića u savremenoj srpskoj pravoslavnoj kulturi. Belgrade: Helsinški odbor za ljudska prava u Srbiji. ISBN 978-8-67208-117-6.
- Byford, Jovan (2008). Denial and Repression of Antisemitism: Post-communist Remembrance of the Serbian Bishop Nikolaj Velimirović. Central European University Press. ISBN 978-9-63977-615-9.
- Byford, Jovan (2011). "Bishop Nikolaj Velimirović: "lackey of the Germans" or a "Victim of Fascism"?". In Ramet, Sabrina P.; Listhaug, Ola (eds.). Serbia and the Serbs in World War Two. London: Palgrave Macmillan. pp. 128–152. ISBN 978-0-230-27830-1.
- Cohen, Philip J. (1996). Serbia's Secret War: Propaganda and the Deceit of History. College Station, Texas: Texas A&M University Press. ISBN 978-0-89096-760-7.
- Hoare, Marko Atilla (2024). Serbia: A Modern History. Oxford: Oxford University Press. ISBN 9780197790441.
- Velimirovic, Nicholai (6 January 1919). "The Serbian Church". The Times. p. 7.
- Perica, Vjekoslav (2002). Balkan Idols: Religion and Nationalism in Yugoslav States. Oxford: Oxford University Press. ISBN 9780195174298.
- Vuković, Sava (1998). History of the Serbian Orthodox Church in America and Canada 1891–1941. Kragujevac: Kalenić.

Eastern Orthodox Church titles
Preceded by Sava Barać	Bishop of Žiča; 1919–1920; 1936–1956	Succeeded by Jefrem Bojović
Preceded by Jefrem Bojović	Bishop of Žiča; 1919–1920; 1936–1956	Succeeded by German Đorić
Recreated Title last held by Chrysostom Kavourides as Metropolitan of Pelagonia	Bishop of Ohrid; 1920–1931	Succeeded by Platon Jovanović
Recreated Title last held by Chrysostom Kavourides as Metropolitan of Pelagonia	Bishop of Ohrid and Bitola; 1931–1936	Succeeded by Platon Jovanović
