= Art collection in ancient Rome =

Art collection and display in ancient Rome

Art collection in ancient Rome was a common practice amongst the ancient Romans. Goods and artworks had symbolic meanings and were used to convey messages about the collector and the Roman state. Due to the popularity of collectable goods an art market sprouted up. These goods were managed at first by the aediles and censors, and later by the curatores aedium sacrarum et operum locorumque. Lists may also have been used to track goods.

== Public collections ==
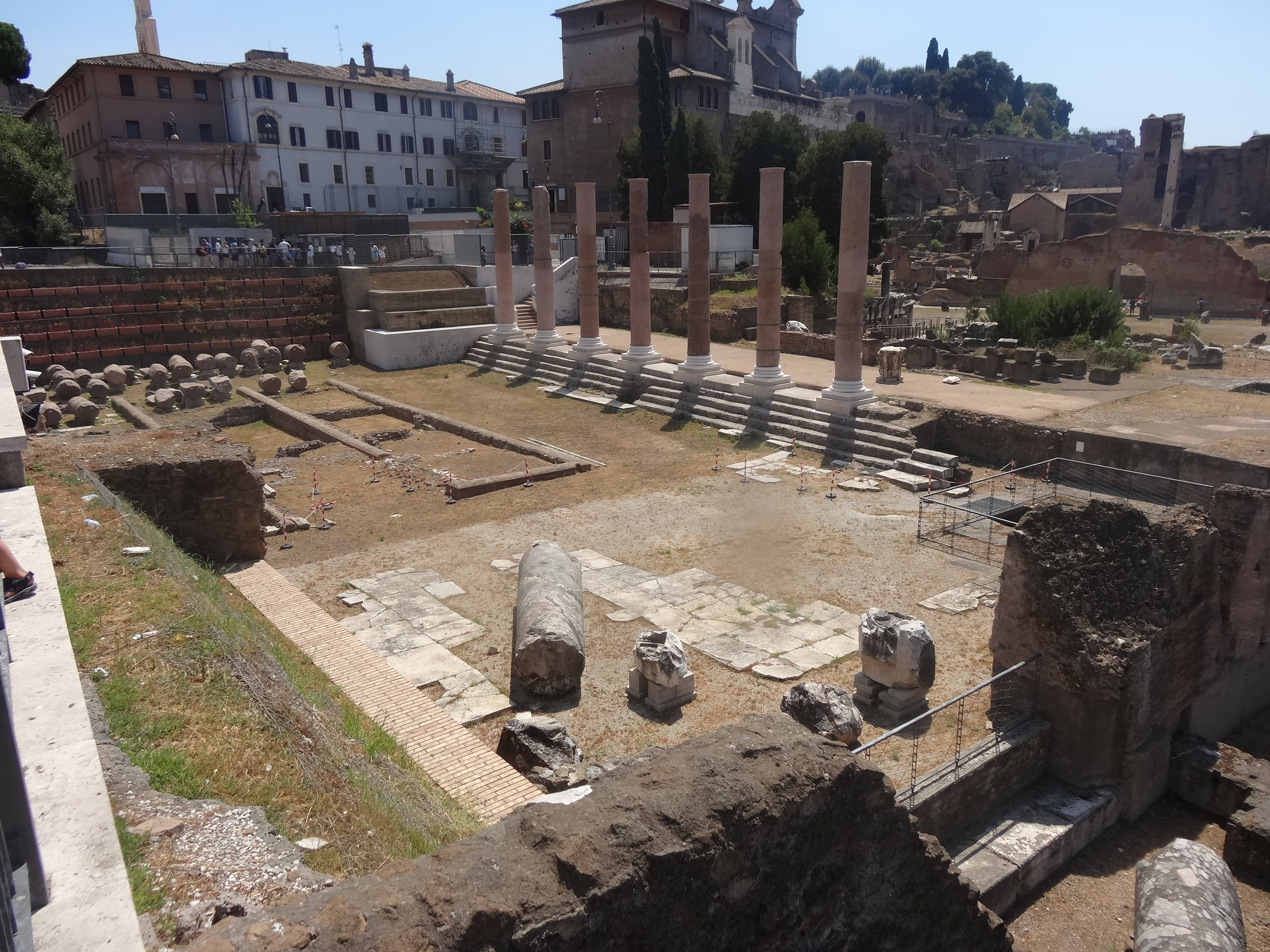
The Temple of Peace, a Roman temple dedicated to the goddess Pax

Ancient Roman temples were ornamented with artworks depicting events from Roman mythology and history. In the Early Roman Empire, Greek statues and sculptures were popular decorations for Roman temples. Macrobius, a 5th-century Roman author, explains that objects in temples can be divided into two categories: decorations and sacred objects. He claims that the difference between these groups is the day in which they are dedicated to the god: decorations were not dedicated on the same day the temple was sanctified, whereas religious objects were sanctified on the same day as the temple. The Lindos Chronicle, a Hellenistic document dated to 99 BCE, catalogues the donations made to the Temple of Athena Lindia prior to the temple's destruction around 392-391 BCE. Cicero, a 1st-century BCE Roman politician, in the series of speeches In Verrem claims that Publius Servilius documented the loot of his conquests in public tablets and registers stored in the treasury.

Decorative items projected the power of the local city and functioned as sources of communal pride. According to the 2nd-century Greek geographer Pausanias, a temple in Chaeronea housed a scepter allegedly held by Agamemnon and forged by Hephaestus. Pausanias claims that this artifact was much venerated by the locals and brought fame to the city. Cicero claims that religious artwork depicting the history of Sicily, which was displayed in a temple of Minerva, was intricately designed and that "there was nothing at Syracuse that was thought more worthy going to see." Objects of religious or cultural significance became highly sought after by collectors; Emperor Caracalla—according to the 3rd-century Roman historian Cassius Dio—collected drinking cups and weapons he believed were once owned by Alexander the Great. The aediles, who were political officials in ancient Rome, established art exhibitions for religious festivals. Cicero describes an aedile named Gnaeus Claudius who utilized a marble statue of Cupid in an art display honoring the Roman deities. During the reign of Augustus, the newly established office of Curatores aedium sacrarum subsumed the responsibility of managing public collections.

Generals publicly showcased loot from their wars, hoping to utilize art displays as political propaganda. Usually, looted objects were displayed in the capital city during a triumph. This was an important religious and political rite; it highlighted the achievements of the triumphing general. Gaius Asinius Pollio reconstructed the Atrium Libertatis, decorating it with loot from his military campaign in Illyria. Emperor Vespasian constructed the Temple of Peace which showcased the loot he gained from his war in Judea. Loot was also displayed in important locations throughout the city of Rome such as the Campus Martius or the Forum. During the 5th century, Lausos—a court eunuch of Theodosius II—organized a public display of various cult statues. These statues depicted figures from traditional Roman paganism; these works were likely acquired from existing Roman temples that were likely abandoned due to the rise of Christianity. In the Theodosian Code, Emperor Constantine decreed that a temple—likely in Edessa—should remain open despite its pagan origins to ensure the residents of the city could continue to view the artwork on display, although Constantine forbid the practice of sacrifice in this temple. During sieges and battles, the Roman military performed a ritual known as evocatio. This practice was designed to divert the opposing's sides patron deities to the Roman side. As part of this practice, religious idols and statues may have been taken from the opposing culture to the Roman cities.

Important historical and cultural sites were also maintained and put on display. The birthplace and house of Romulus were preserved and publicly displayed on the Palatine hill. It may have been located on the Capitoline Hill. However, this structure may have been a copy of the one on the Palatine hill. Emperors and generals commemorated their successes through the construction of monuments such as the Arch of Constantine, which were designed to publicly showcase the notability of a person's achievements. Through these forms of public display artworks gained new meaning. To the Romans, they were representative of the Roman state's triumph over their enemies. Another kind involved the creation of movable paintings. To create this, marble was inserted in niches in the stonework. Frescoes were used to decorate the walls of an oecus or cryptoporticus.

== Private collections ==
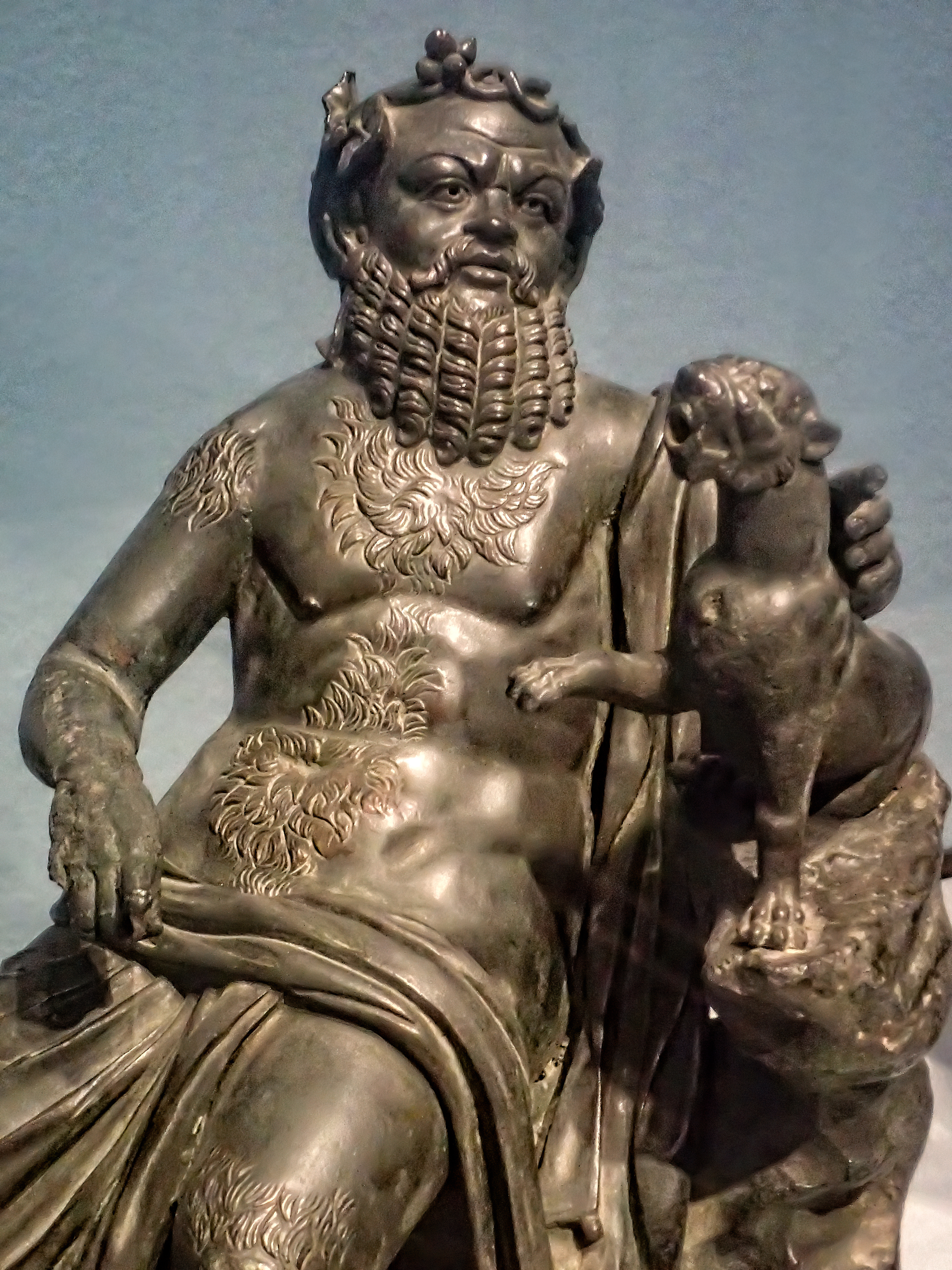
Bronze statue depicting a satyr found in the Villa of the Papyri

Aside from public spaces, the Romans stored art collections within their own houses and villas. The Villa of the Papyri, an ancient villa from Herculaneum, contained 85 statues: 22 of marble and 63 of bronze. It was considered a sign of high social status to have many visitors come to see the artwork in one's house. There were numerous methods of displaying works in ancient Rome. One method of displaying works was the Pinacothecae. It was a kind of picture gallery where paintings were painted on marble or wood panels. They became popular in the mid-1st century BCE. The 1st-century BCE Roman orator Quintus Hortensius reportedly paid 144,000 sesterces for a painting of the Argonauts made by the 4th-century BCE Greek painter Cydias; he later constructed a shrine in his villa to hold this painting. According to Diodorus Siculus, a 1st-century BCE Greek historian, many of the wealthy citizens of Agrigentum were habitual collectors of expensive and sublime art. Diodorus further records that the Carthaginian general Hamilcar Barca looted much of this artwork during the First Punic War in the 3rd-century BCE.

In Alexandria and Pergamon, private collections were stored in libraries, the atria of libraries, gardens, banquet halls, and royal palaces. These collections were heavily influenced by Hellenism, collectors were motivated by their respect and deference for Greek culture. Gaius Asinius Pollio amassed a sizeable private collection of Greek sculptures and art; he displayed this collection publicly because, according to the 1st-century CE Roman writer Pliny the Elder, he was "accordingly anxious for his collection to attract sightseers." Replicas of ancient art pieces, particularly the works of famous artists such as Zeuxis, were highly sought after by ancient Roman collectors. Archaeological excavations in Baiae revealed more than 400 plaster casts used to create replicas of statues from the 5 and 4th centuries BCE. There likely was a significant amount of fraud on the Roman art market; vendors may have inscribed the name of popular artists—such as Praxiteles—into their products to deceive customers into believing they were original works of the artists. One potential example of Roman art forgery comes from the Apollo of Piombino, a bronze statue made in the 1st-century BCE that was designed to emulate the style of a 5th-century BCE Greek statue. Despite the presumed prevalence of hoaxes in the Roman art world, there is little known ancient legislation concerning the topic. Roman art collectors could satiate their needs by contracting artists, often Greek artists, for commissions. Aulus Gabinius, a Roman consul in 58, employed a Greek painter named Antiochus.

Livy, a 1st-century BCE Roman historian, stated that the Roman passion for collecting Greek artwork originated from the capture of Syracuse in 211 BCE. He claims that following the conquest of Syracuse, large quantities of Greek art flowed into Rome as the spoils of war; this loot then began to be collected by the Romans. Livy viewed this obsession with Hellenism negatively, calling the statues looted from Syracuse "tokens of danger" and "allurements of vice." He warned his readers, "the more I fear that these things [Greek artwork] will capture us rather than we them." Loot from other conquests became sought after by Roman collectors; ebony was sent to Rome following the defeat of Mithridates in 66 BCE and Lucius Scipio exported chased silverware and golden vessels to Rome after his conquest of Asia in 189 BCE.

== Engraved gems ==
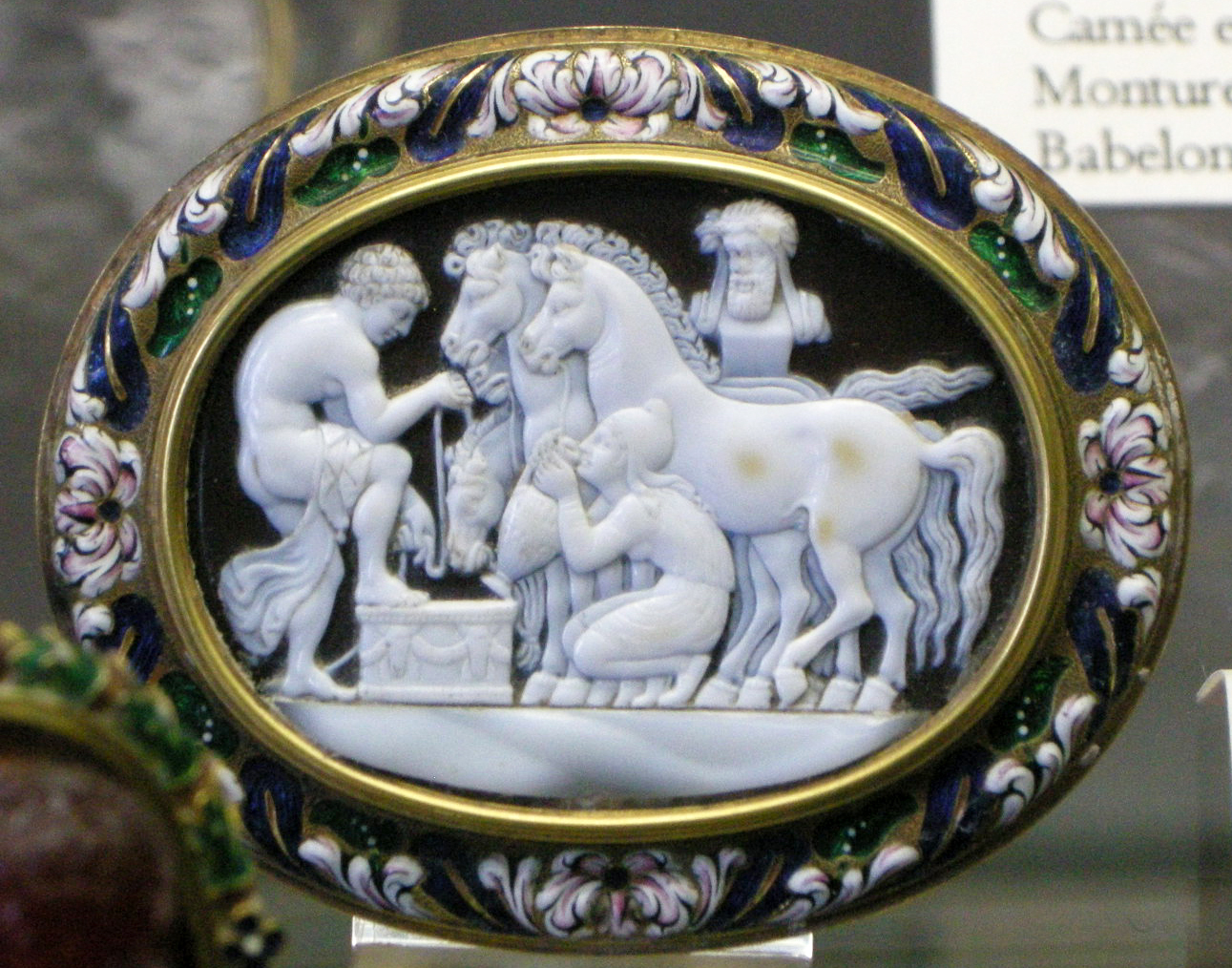
1st century BC cameo engraved gem with Troilus and Polyxena surprised by Achilles. Post-classical mount.

A popular, and conveniently portable, type of object collected was the engraved gem. Many Greek and Hellenistic artists were very well-known and sought after. Famous collectors begin with King Mithridates VI of Pontus (d. 63 BC), whose collection was part of the booty of Pompey the Great, who donated it to the Temple of Jupiter in Rome. Julius Caesar was determined to excel Pompey in this as in other areas, and later gave six collections to his own Temple of Venus Genetrix; according to Suetonius gems were among his varied collecting passions. Many later emperors also collected gems. Chapters 4-6 of Book 37 of the Natural History of Pliny the Elder give a summary art history of the Greek and Roman tradition, and of Roman collecting. According to Pliny Marcus Aemilius Scaurus, praetor in 56 BC, was the first Roman collector.

== Cultural significance ==
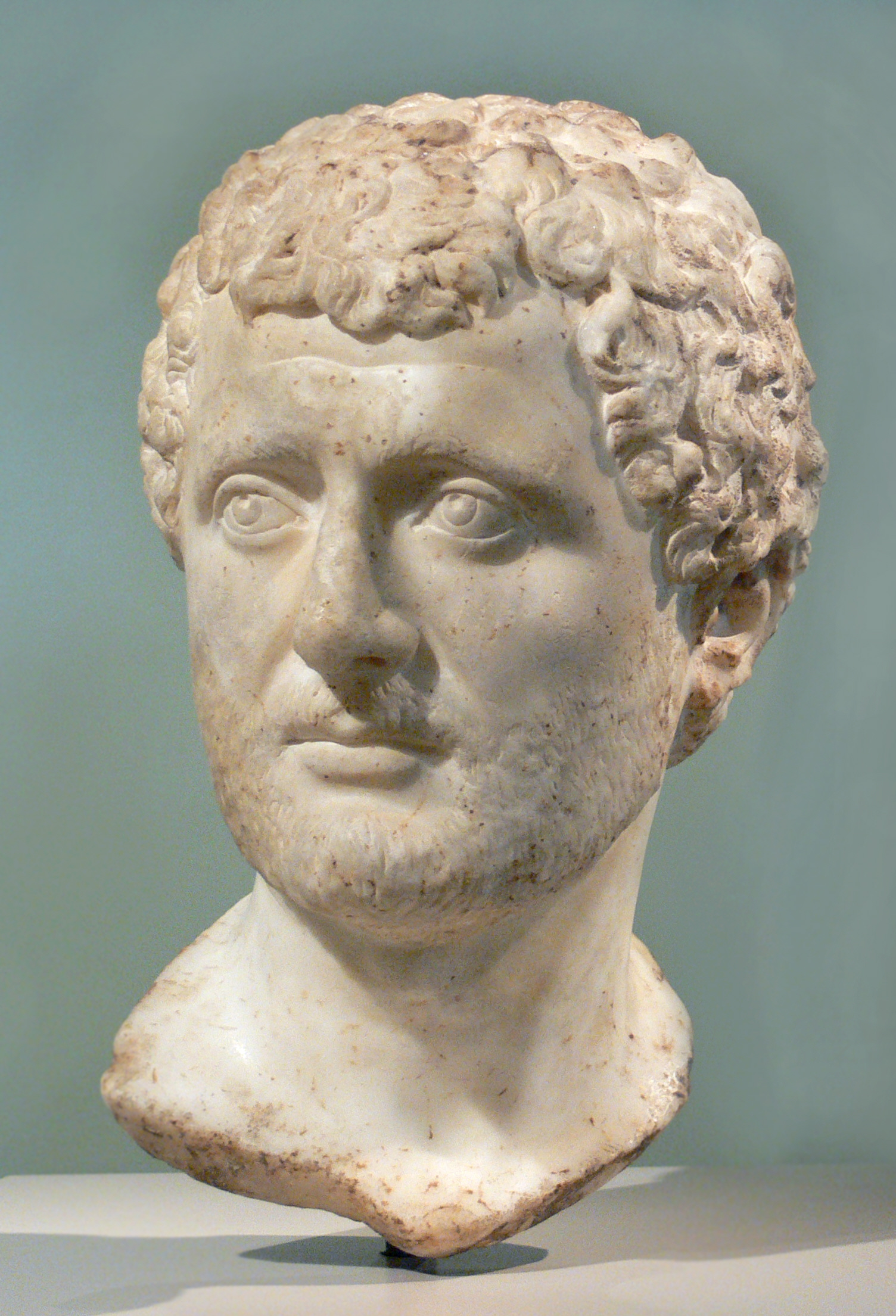
Ancient Roman portrait of a man's head

The objects the Romans liked to collect often had a symbolic purpose. Cicero viewed one's material possessions as an extension of oneself. Patricians would collect wax figures of their ancestors and use them to decorate their houses and during funeral services. Portraits of famous figures would also be collected. These artworks were status symbols and were used to showcase moral virtues. Collected objects often represented the past and the achievements and identity of Rome. Collections were used to convey messages about the collector and Roman society at large. Cicero described his political opponent, Verres, as an unvirtuous collector. Verres was described as a person obsessed with other's perceptions of himself, and with a lust for art pieces.

For Roman women, two stereotypes existed: The good, "honourable" women who were associated with "the house, piety and religion", who would only collect objects needed for "the adornments of the house, or religious practices." And on the other hand, the "frivolous, vain, time-wasting" women who would acquire "objects of personal adornment" in order to seduce men. Sometimes, women used the male population's desires for goods such as citron tables as a defense against accusations of extravagance in pearls.

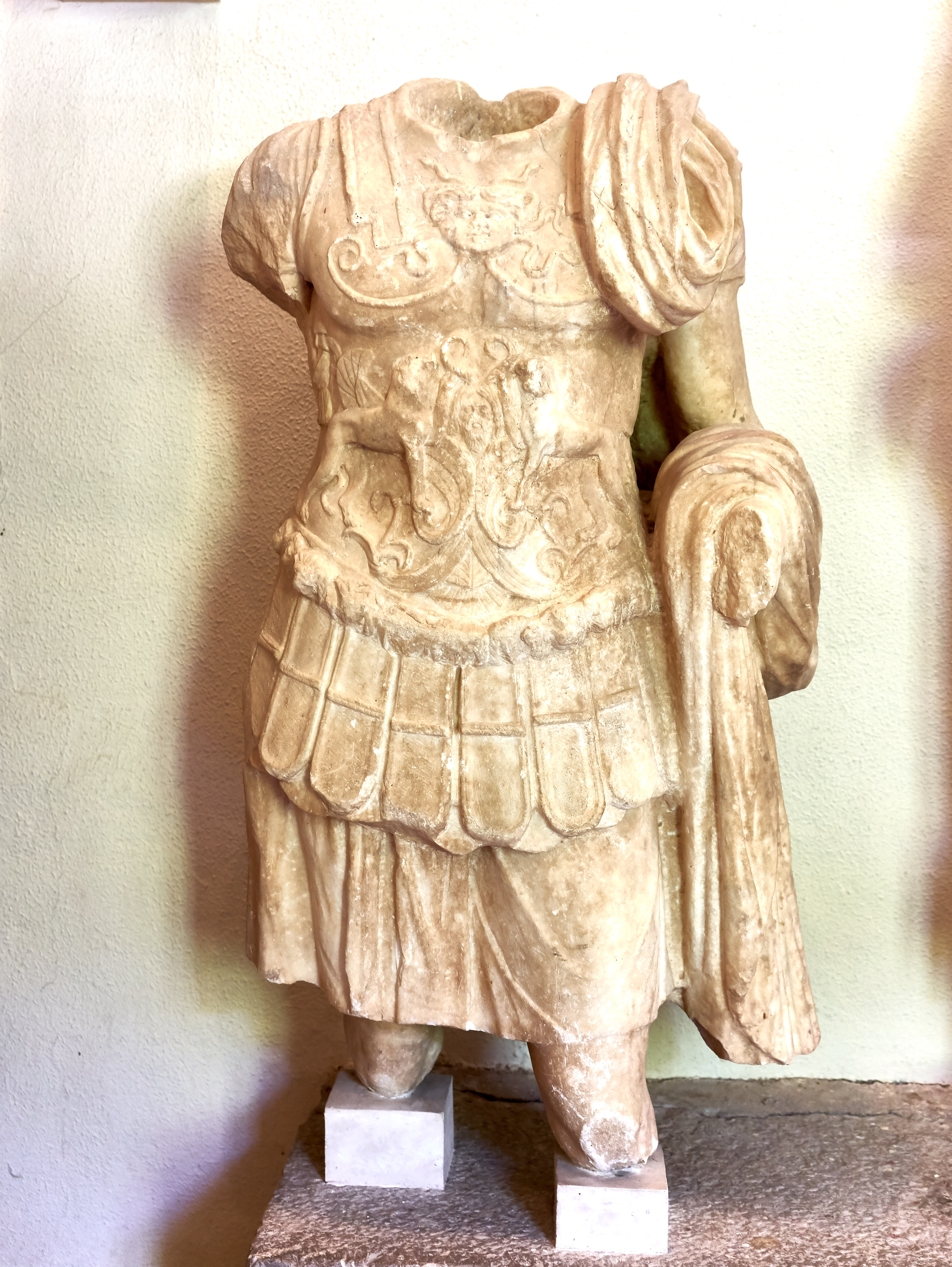
Ancient Roman sculpture of a Roman official

Objects and artworks could become expensive and valuable due to the cultural significance attached to them. The art market expanded to allow for intentionally collectable goods and art pieces designed to follow cultural and artistic trends. Pliny the Elder uses the term insania to describe the populace's affinity for citron tables. Despite the name, these "citron" tables were likely actually made of the Tetraclinis tree. Pliny also describes how the orator Lucius Crassus had cups so valuable he had never used them. He was said to have paid 100,000 sesterces for two of these cups. Silverware were common materials to collect, and they were considered a sign of high social status, with one ex-consul spending 70,000 sesterces on a murrhine goblet. Other commonly collected materials included jewelry, carpets, books, and furniture. Artworks and goods were sold in areas such as the forum. Some Romans considered the love of goods and the desire to collect objects to be immoral. Agrippa, inspired by one of Cato's speeches, stated that artwork should not be held by private individuals but instead returned to the populace.

== Administration ==
Augustus established the curatores aedium sacrarum et operum locorumque publicorum, which was a group of two individuals tasked with managing architecture and public art. This organization's role was previously filled by the censors and the aediles. It is possible that artworks and artifacts were tracked with inventory lists of works in collections or on public display. These lists would have been called litterae publicae. Statues may have been identified based on inscriptions that identified where they were located in the lists. These inscriptions would have abbreviations that showcased the text's volume, the column of the work, and its number.
