= Saint Isidora =

Eastern Orthodox saint

Saint Isidora of Tabenna
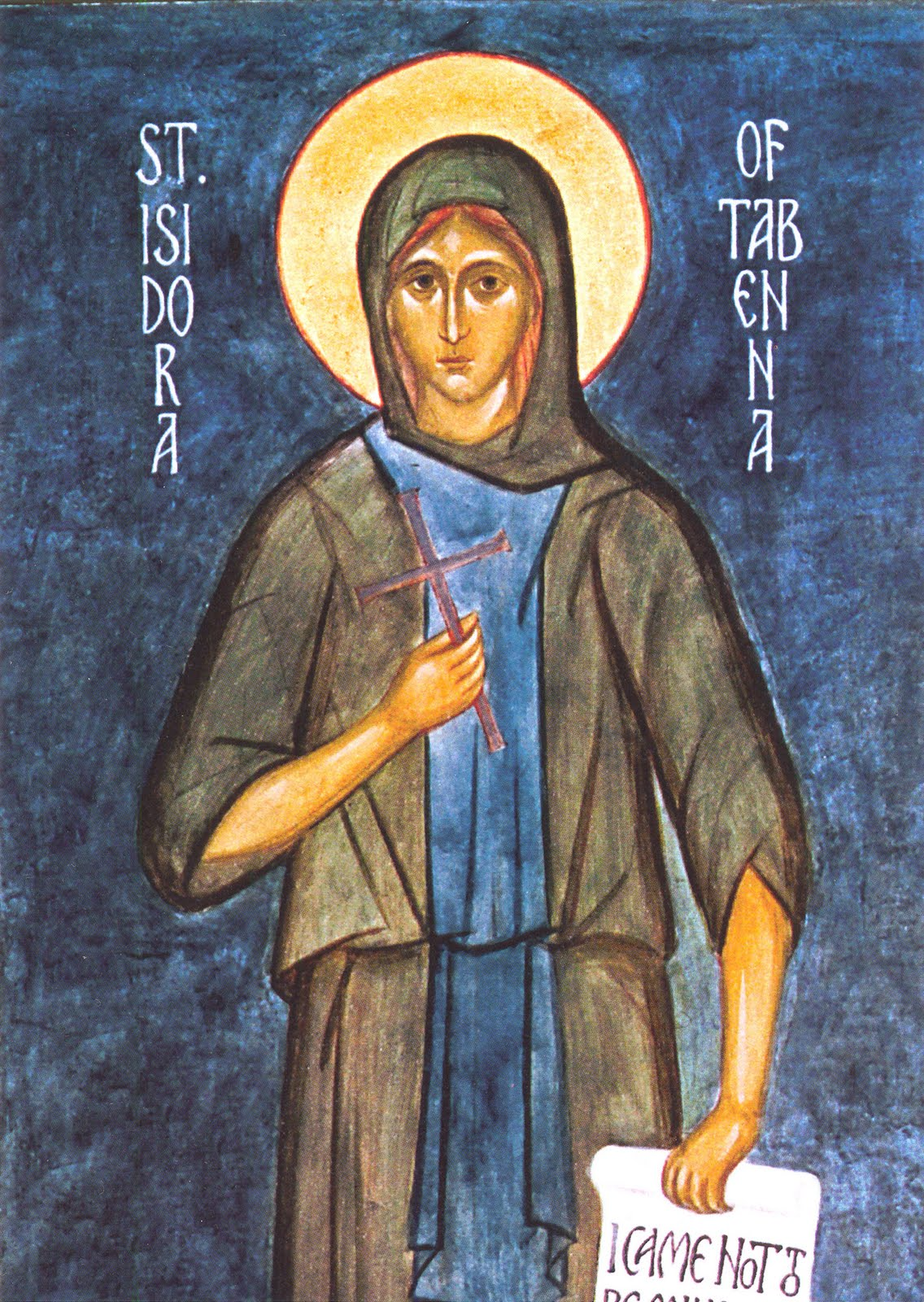

Fool for Christ
- Born: After AD 300; Location unknown
- Died: Before AD 365; Location unknown
- Venerated in: Eastern Orthodox Church; Roman Catholic Church
- Canonized: Pre-congregation
- Feast: 10 May (Eastern Orthodox); 1 May (Roman Catholic)
- Attributes: Fool for Christ

Saint Isidora, also known as Saint Isidore and Isidora of Tabenna, was a Christian nun and saint of the 4th century AD. She is considered among the earliest fools for Christ. While very little is known of Isidora's life, she is remembered for her exemplification of the writing of St. Paul: "Whosoever of you believes that he is wise by the measure of this world, may he become a fool, so as to become truly wise." The story of Isidora effectively highlights the Christian ideal that recognition or glory from man is second to one's actions being seen by God, even if that means that one's actions or even one's self remains unknown or misunderstood. This ideal was extremely important to the early Desert Fathers and Desert Mothers who recorded Isidora's story.

== Early life ==
There are few biographical details concerning the life of Saint Isidora. Most of what is known can be found in the Lausiac History (Historia Lausiaca), written in 419–420 by Palladius of Galatia at the request of Lausus, chamberlain at the court of the Byzantine emperor Theodosius II. While other texts from this time mention the story of St. Isidora, the Lausiac History is the most commonly referenced text about her life.

Isidora's birthdate is unknown, as is her age at the time when she joined the Tabenna monastery in Egypt. Tabenna, or Tabennesi, was the original monastery established by St. Pachomius sometime after 325 AD. Prior to that time, the tradition was for monastics to live alone as hermits or anchorites, each devoted to a monastic rule that they had individually received from God. St. Pachomius, who believed that groups of monastics living together would be able to better support each other in their devotion to monastic rules, under the guidance of the Holy Spirit and his elder Palaemon traveled to Tabennesi to establish his monastery. Pachomius's sister Maria, with his help, established a woman's monastery near her brother's, creating the first full community for women in Egypt.

It is unknown in what year St. Isidora came to the monastery established by Maria or her age at the time. The record of events at the monastery provide the few biographical details in existence.

== The monastery at Tabenna ==
When Isidora lived at the monastery, it is believed that approximately 400 women lived and worked there, devoting themselves to monastic life. As part of the community at the monastery, Isidora remained a type of outsider, known to wander about in the kitchen focused on performing menial tasks. She was commonly called "the monastery sponge", a reference to her willingness to accept the dirtiest of jobs at the monastery. While it was said that Isidora was tonsured when joining the monastery, she stood apart from the other sisters by wearing a rag (most likely a dish towel from the kitchen) on her head. This type of head covering was in sharp contrast to the standard tonsure or cowls worn by the other sisters.

== Behavior ==
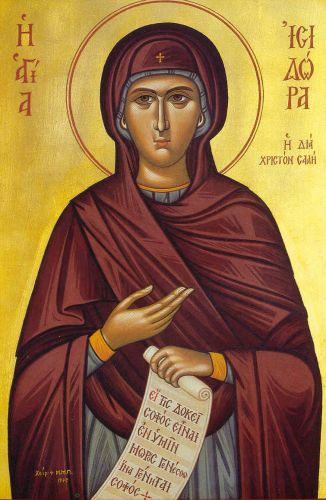
Icon of Saint Isidora

By all accounts, Isidora maintained a pattern of erratic behavior for which the other sisters at the monastery considered her insane or possessed by a demon. In the Lausiac History, Palladius writes that Isidora “feigned madness and possession by a demon”, although no examples of her behavior are provided. However, her behavior alienated her from the other sisters and she was treated with derision and open contempt, sometimes beaten for her behavior.

Palladius writes that Isidora was detested to the point that the other sisters would not eat with her, which she purportedly preferred. It was noted that none of the 400 sisters ever saw Isidora eating a formal meal. Palladius writes that "she never sat at table, nor partook of a piece of bread, but wiping up the crumbs from the tables and washing the kitchen pots she was content with what she got in this way", suggesting that Isidora subsisted mainly on crumbs left behind from the others' meals and the dishwater that she used for cleaning. Palladius also writes that despite her behavior, "never did she insult any one nor grumble nor talk either little or much, although she was cuffed, insulted, cursed and execrated."

In all accounts of Isidora, her madness or possession was feigned or a matter of pretense. Isidora's dedication to Christianity led her to manifest the words of St. Paul, who wrote: "Whosoever of you believes that he is wise by the measure of this world, may he become a fool, so as to become truly wise." This may explain her affectations, as she kept her true intentions to herself while inwardly her suffering for the sake of being a fool became an act of worship.

== Meeting St. Pitirim ==
According to Palladius, Saint Pitirim (also Piteroum) was living in the desert as a well-known and respected hermit or anchorite during Isidora's years at the monastery. As he was praying one day, an angel appeared to Saint Pitirim and asked, "Why are you proud of yourself for being religious and dwelling in a place like this? Do you want to see a woman who is more religious than you? Go to the monastery of the Tabennesi women and there you will find a woman wearing a crown on her head. She is better than you. For though she spars with so great a crowd, she has never let her heart go away from God. But you sit here and wander in imagination through the different cities."

Saint Pitirim visited the convent in search of the woman with the crown. When Isidora was brought before Pitirim, he perceived the rag on her forehead (in some accounts he saw a crown appear above her) and he fell at her feet and said "Bless me". Isidora fell before Pitirim in a similar manner and asked, "Do you bless me, Master?" He declared her to be a spiritual leader and the sisters confessed their abuses of Isidora to Pitirim.

== Flight from monastery ==
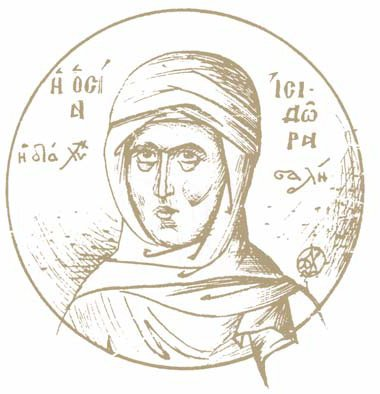
Image of Isidora of Tabenna

Upon Pitirim's departure, treatment of Isidora changed dramatically within the monastery, as the sisters continued to request her forgiveness and began to revere her as blessed. However, after a few days, unable to bear the glory and honor bestowed upon her and burdened by their apologies, Isidora left the monastery.

== Later life and death ==
After leaving the monastery, Isidora essentially disappeared. No stories, records or texts exist that indicate where she might have traveled, how she lived or how she died. Most modern scholarship suggests that she died no later than the year 365 AD.

== Canonization ==
The date of canonization for Saint Isidora is unknown. Having lived before the Sacred Congregation of Rites founded by Pope Sixtus V in 1588 (now the Congregation for the Causes of Saints), the records of Isidora's canonization have been lost and may not have existed. During Isidora's lifetime, the process for canonization fell under Pre-congregation, in which designates for sainthood could be canonized by a local bishop or primate based on devotion, which is likely the means by which Isidora became a saint.

The feast day of Isidora is celebrated by both the Eastern Orthodox Church and Roman Catholic Church on 10 May and 1 May respectively.
