= David, Bishop of the Kurds =

Monk, bishop and historian in the 7th or 8th century

David (Syriac: ܕܘܝܕ ܕܟܪ̈ܬܘܝܐ, romanized: Dawid d-Kartwāyē) was a monk, bishop and historian of the Church of the East in the 7th or 8th century.

Originally a monk of Beth Abe, he later became the bishop of the Kurdish tribes in the region of Kartaw. This region was located in Upper Mesopotamia, in the north of Adiabene, west of the Lower Zab and north of Erbil. He was writing no earlier than the reign of Hnanisho I, patriarch of the Church of the East from 686 to 698.

David wrote in Syriac a work known as the Little Paradise (Syriac: Pardīsā zʿūrā) to distinguish it from the Paradise of the Fathers of Palladius of Galatia and the Paradise of the Orientals of Joseph Hazzaya. It is presumed lost. According to Thomas of Marga in chapter XXI of his Book of Governors, David wrote at the request of a Persian nobleman named Khuznahir, a Christian from Bashosh (near Shalmash). The Little Paradise was a series of "histories" of Mesopotamian ascetics beginning with George bar Sayyadhe, who was the ninth abbot of Beth Abe in 590. It certainly also contained biographies of the next four abbots of Beth Abe: George's brother and successor, Sama of Neshra; Nathaniel; Selibha the Aramaean; and Gabriel, called the Little Sparrow, who flourished in the late seventh century. It does not appear to have been an extensive work, more probably having a "bite-size, compilatory structure." It was probably conceived as a companion volume to Enanisho's Syriac edition of Palladius. Thomas of Marga cites it in his chapter XXIV concerning a famine that took place during the youth of John of Daylam. David's work is also cited in the metrical history of Beth Qoqa by John bar Zobi.

Several modern authors identify the David who was bishop of the Kurds and author of the Little Paradise with David of Beth Rabban, who was active during the reign of Timothy I (780–823). Carl Anton Baumstark and Sebastian Brock, however, clearly distinguish the two.

== Bibliography ==
- Baumstark, Anton (1922). Geschichte der Syrischen Literatur. Bonn: Weber.
- Brock, Sebastian P. (2011). "Dawid bar Pawlos". In Sebastian P. Brock; Aaron M. Butts; George A. Kiraz; Lucas Van Rompay (eds.). Gorgias Encyclopedic Dictionary of the Syriac Heritage: Electronic Edition. Gorgias Press. Published online by Beth Mardutho, 2018.
- Budge, E. A. Wallis, ed. (1893). The Book of Governors: The Historia Monastica of Thomas, Bishop of Margâ A.D. 840. London: Kegan Paul, Trench, Trübner & Co.
- Duval, Paul-Rubens (2013) [1900]. Holmey, Olivier (ed.). Syriac Literature. Gorgias Eastern Christian Studies. Translated by Olivier Holmey. Gorgias Press. doi:10.31826/9781463234102. ISBN 9781463234102.
- Fiey, Jean Maurice (1965). Assyrie chrétienne. Vol. 1. Beirut: Imprimerie Catholique.
- Ferguson, Scott Fitzgerald (2016). "The Westwardness of Things: Literary Geography and the Church of the East". In Li Tang; Dietmar W. Winkler (eds.). Winds of Jingjiao: Studies on Syriac Christianity in China and Central Asia. LIT Verlag. pp. 183–202.
- Karlsson, Jonas (2020). "The Arabic Lives of John of Daylam". In Barbara Roggema; Alexander Treiger (eds.). Patristic Literature in Arabic Translations. Arabic Christianity, 2. Leiden: Brill. pp. 129–157.
- Margoliouth, J. P. (1927). Supplement to the Thesaurus Syriacus of R. Payne Smith, S.T.P. Oxford: Oxford University Press.
- Nikitine, Basile (1922). "Les Kurdes et le christianisme". Revue de l'histoire des religions. 85: 147–156. JSTOR 23663983.
- Tannous, Jack B. (2018). The Making of the Medieval Middle East: Religion, Society, and Simple Believers. Princeton University Press.
- Van Nuffelen, Peter; Van Hoof, Lieve, eds. (2020) [2018]. Clavis Historicorum Antiquitatis Posterioris. Ghent University.
- Wright, William (1894). A Short History of Syriac Literature (PDF). Adam and Charles Black. Archived from the original (PDF) on 2020-10-26.
