= Archimandrite =

Monastic title in Eastern Christianity

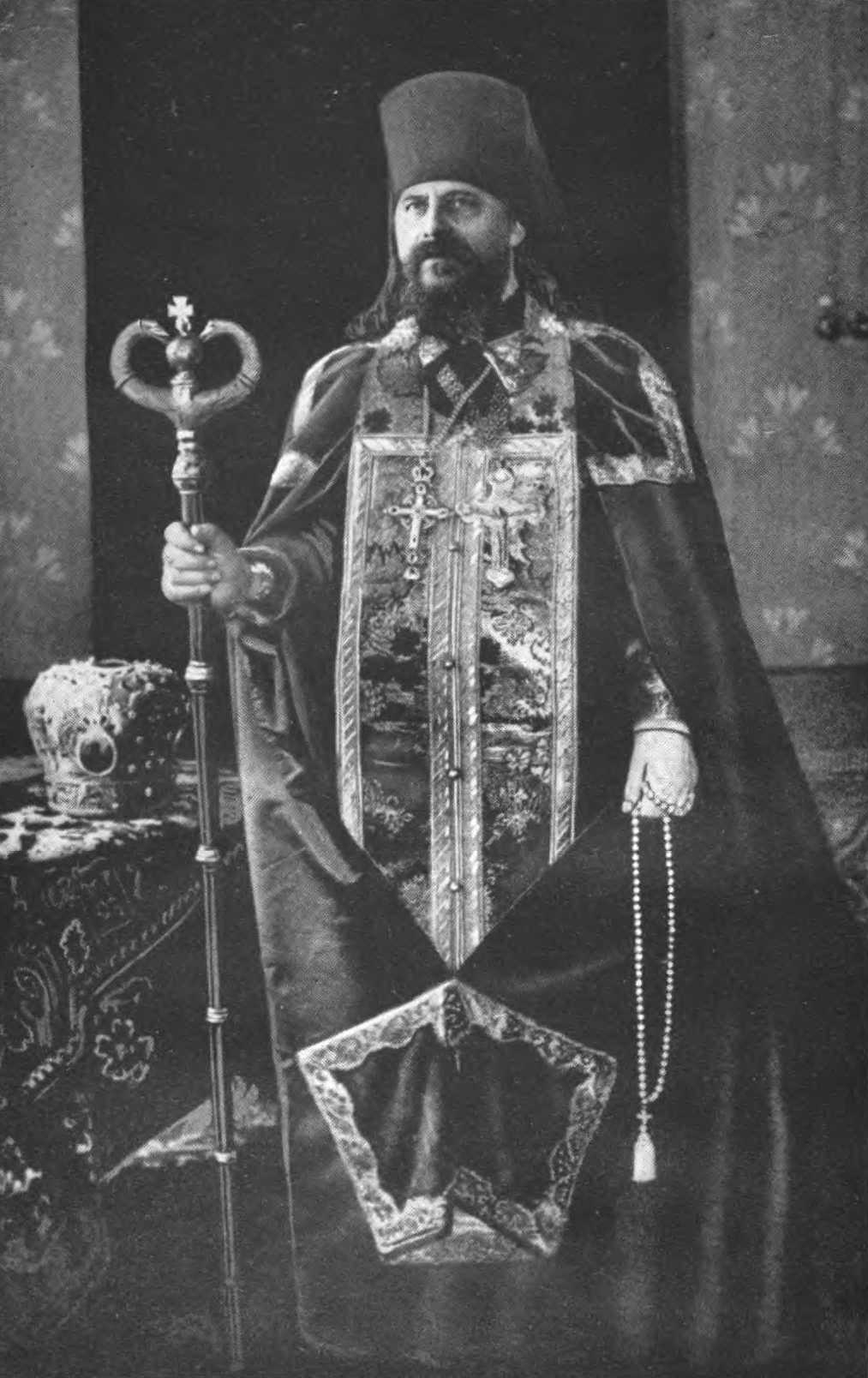
An archimandrite wearing his full habit, holding his pastoral staff, and minimally vested in an epitrachelion and epimanikia. His mitre stands on the table to his right.

The title archimandrite (/ˌɑːrkɪˈmændraɪt/; Greek: ἀρχιμανδρίτης, romanized: archimandritēs), used in Eastern Christianity, originally referred to a superior abbot (hegumenos, Greek: ἡγούμενος, present participle of the verb meaning "to lead") whom a bishop appointed to supervise several "ordinary" abbots and monasteries, or as the abbot of some especially great and important monastery. Since the 18th century it is most often used purely as a title of honor (with no connection to any actual monastery) and is bestowed on a hieromonk as a mark of respect or gratitude for service to the Church.

This title is only given to those priests who have been tonsured monks, while distinguished non-monastic (typically married) priests would be given the title of protopresbyter.

== History ==
The term archimandrite derives from the Greek: the first element from ἀρχι- archi- meaning "highest" or from archon "ruler"; and the second root from μάνδρα mandra meaning "enclosure" or "corral", "pen" and denoting a "monastery" (compare the usage of "flock" for "congregation").

The title has been in common use since the 5th century, but is mentioned for the first time in a letter to Epiphanius, prefixed to his Panarium (c. 375), but the Lausiac History of Palladius may evidence its common use in the 4th century as applied to Saint Pachomius.

By the end of the 5th century, the term had begun to be used in the patriarchate of Jerusalem for someone who had the oversight of all the monks of a region or diocese. Similar to an abbot visitor, the archimandrite would visit the monasteries under his charge to see that the monks were keeping a serious religious life, to draw attention to abuses, straighten out difficulties and give confidence and encouragement to all those who needed it. As such, when the archimandrite Marcian died around 491/92, the monks in the wilderness around Jerusalem went to the patriarch to ask to obtain Sabbas as archimandrite of the anchorites and cave-dwellers and Theodosius as archimandrite of all cenobitic living monks.

When the supervision of monasteries passed to another episcopal official—the Great Sakellarios ("sacristan")—the title of archimandrite became an honorary one for abbots of important monasteries (compared to an ordinary abbot, a hegumenos).

== Byzantine usage ==
The Eastern Orthodox and Byzantine Catholic churches commonly select their bishops from the ranks of the archimandrites.

As abbots, the duties of both a hegumen and an archimandrite are the same; however, during the Divine Service, a hegumen wears a simple mantle, while the mantle of an archimandrite is decorated with sacral texts; an archimandrite also bears a pastoral staff (pateritsa).

=== Kiev Metropolis ===
Initially, in some cases it served as an extra title: for example, manuscripts of 1174 mention Hegumen Polikarp of Kiev Cave Monastery as "Hegumen Archimandrite".

=== Russian usage ===
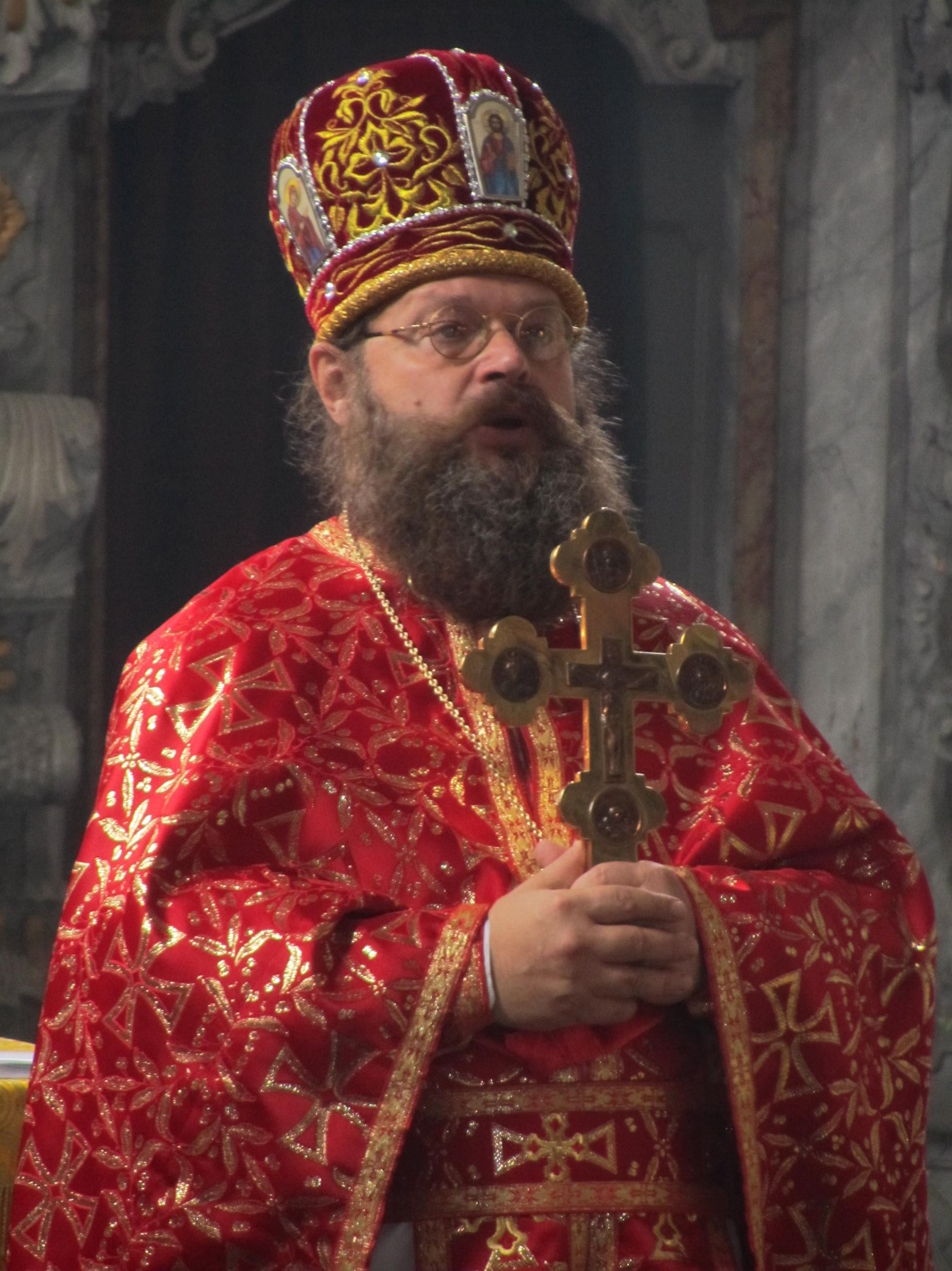
Archimandrite Martin Marek Krupica fully vested with mitre

In 1764, the Russian Orthodox Church organized its monasteries and ranked them in one of three classes, awarding only the abbots at the head of monasteries of the second or first class the title of archimandrite. Abbots of third class monasteries were to be styled "hegumen".

In the Russian tradition, an archimandrite wears a mitre.

=== Greek usage ===
Churches under the spiritual jurisdiction of the four ancient Eastern Orthodox Patriarchates generally require that such a monastic priest possess a university degree in theology before he is elevated to the rank of archimandrite. Sometimes, the requirement is waived if the priest can show outstanding achievement in other academic fields, such as the humanities or science.

== Western usage ==
An archimandrite who does not function as an abbot has the style "The Very Reverend Archimandrite" whilst one with abbatial duties uses the style "The Right Reverend Archimandrite".

The word occurs in the Regula Columbani (c. 7), and du Cange gives a few other cases of its use in Latin documents, but it never came into vogue in the West; yet, owing to intercourse with Greek and Slavonic Christianity, the title sometimes appears in southern Italy and Sicily, and in Croatia, Hungary and Poland. From 1979, there is at least one exemplar in Britain.

== Bibliography ==
- Dictionnaire d'archéologie chrétienne et de liturgie (in French)
