= Enanisho =

ʿEnanishoʿ (Syriac: ܥܢܢܝܫܘܥ, (Note: Ephrem Barsoum mistakenly spelled his name ܚܢܢܝܫܘܥ, Ḥenanishoʿ.) also romanized ʿAnanishoʿ or ʿNānišoʿ) was a Syriac monk, philosopher, lexicographer and translator of the Church of the East who flourished in the 7th century.

== Biography ==
ʿEnanishoʿ was from the region of Adiabene. He and his brother Ishoʿyahb studied at the school of Nisibis at the same time as the future patriarch Ishoʿyahb III (r. 649–659). His brother went on to become bishop of Shenna, while he entered the monastery of Mar Abraham on Mount Izla. He later made a pilgrimage to the Holy Land and the monasteries of Scetis in Egypt, becoming well acquainted with Greek literature and Egyptian monasticism. Upon his return he joined the monastery of Beth ʿAbe.

== Writings ==
At Beth ʿAbe, ʿEnanishoʿ took up writing. His extensive travels, especially to Egypt, had a major influence on his writings. He wrote a philosophical treatise on "definitions and divisions" and a glossary of difficult words to aid in reading the Church Fathers. He wrote Book of Rules for Homographs (Note: Its conventional Latin title is Liber canonum de aequilitteris.) about Syriac homographs, words having the same spelling (i.e., consonants) but different pronunciation (i.e., vowels) and meaning. He collaborated with Ishoʿyahb III to revise the Ḥudrā, a liturgical book containing the hymns for Sunday services in the East Syriac rite. Ishoʿyahb's successor, Giwargis I (r. 660/1–680/1), then commissioned him to compile the Paradise of the Fathers, a collection of Syriac translations of Greek works. This major compilation comprises four books: the Lausiac History of Palladius of Helenopolis, another work of history attributed to Palladius, the History of the Monks in Egypt attributed to Jerome and a collection of sayings of the Desert Fathers.

The sayings as compiled by ʿEnanishoʿ in Syriac are known under the title Paradise of the Fathers. The Paradise contains some original material based on ʿEnanishoʿ's visit to Scetis. It is divided into fifteen chapters, with the first fourteen arranged topically and the last an unsystematic grouping. It had a major influence on East Syriac monasticism. A commentary on it was written before the end of the century by Dadīshōʿ Ḳaṭrāya. The Book of the Little Paradise of David, Bishop of the Kurds, was probably intended as a companion piece covering the native holy men of Mesopotamia. According to Thomas of Marga, a copy was kept in every monastery in the Church of the East.

== Bibliography ==
Editions and translations

- Budge, E. A. Wallis, ed. (1904). The Book of Paradise, Being the Histories and Sayings of the Monks and Ascetics of the Egyptian Desert. Vol. 2 vols. London.
- Budge, E. A. Wallis, ed. (1907). The Paradise, or Garden of the Holy Fathers. Vol. 2 vols. London: Chatto & Windus.
- Sauget, Joseph-Marie, ed. (1987). Une traduction arabe de la collection d'Apopthegmata Patrum de ʿEnānīšōʿ. Étude du ms. Paris arabe 253 et des témoins parallèles. Louvain: Peeters.

Secondary literature

- Baumstark, Anton (1922). Geschichte der Syrischen Literatur. Weber.
- Childers, Jeff W. (2018) [2011]. "ʿEnanishoʿ". In Sebastian P. Brock; Aaron M. Butts; George A. Kiraz; Lucas Van Rompay (eds.). Gorgias Encyclopedic Dictionary of the Syriac Heritage: Electronic Edition. Beth Mardutho [Gorgias Press].
- Sims-Williams, Nicholas (1994). "Dādišoʿ Qaṭrāyā's Commentary on the Paradise of the Fathers". Analecta Bollandiana. 112 (1): 33–64. doi:10.1484/j.abol.4.01639.
- Walters, James E.; et al. (9 December 2016). "ʿEnanishoʿ — ܥܢܢܝܫܘܥ". In David A. Michelson; Nathan P. Gibson (eds.). A Guide to Syriac Authors. Vol. 2 of The Syriac Biographical Dictionary.
- Wilmshurst, David (2011). The Martyred Church: A History of the Church of the East. East and West Publishing.
- Wortley, John (2012). The Book of the Elders—Sayings of the Desert Fathers: The Systematic Collection. Cistercian Publications Liturgical Press. ISBN 978-0-87907-201-8.
