= Pitirim =

Pitirim (Greek: Πιτυροῦν) is a Greek given name, also used in Russia in the past, mostly as a monastic name.

- Patriarch Pitirim of Moscow (died 1673), ninth Patriarch of Moscow and All Russia
- Pitirim Sorokin, Russian and American sociologist and political activist
- Pitirim of Porphyry, also Pitirim of Egypt, Egyptian Christian monastic and saint of the fourth century
- Pitirim (Oknov) (1858–1920), bishop of the Russian Orthodox Church; Metropolitan of Petrograd and Ladoga
