= Pitirim of Porphyry =

Christian monk and saint in Egypt

Abba Pitirim of Porphyry

Abba Pitirim of Mount Porphyry, Piteroum Savants, Pityrun, Pithyrion, Pityrune
- Born: c. fourth century Egypt
- Residence: Mount Porphyry, the Thebaid
- Died: c. fourth or fifth century Egypt
- Honored in: Orthodox Church and Catholic Church
- Feast: November 29
- Influences: Anthony the Great
- Influenced: Isidora

Abba Pitirim of Porphyry (Greek: Πιτυροῦν) or Pitirim of Egypt was an Egyptian Christian monastic and saint of the fourth century, and a disciple of Anthony the Great. His feast day is November 29 in the Orthodox Church and the Catholic Church.

== Life ==
Pitirim was an abbot of many monks, was the third successor of Anthony the Great in his hermitage, and was said to have received Anthony's virtues. He lived on Mount Porphyry (Greek: Πορφυρίτη, romanized: Porphyriti) in the Thebaid, which was probably named after its proximity to the Roman quarry of Mons Porphyrites that mined a rare stone by the same name.

Pitirim continued the work of Anthony by instructing Christian monks along the Nile in the Thebaid, and lived with his followers in austere asceticism. It was said of Pitirim that he only ate water mixed with a little bit of flour twice a week, and that sometimes he would fast from food entirely.

Pitirim died in the late fourth or early fifth century.

=== Meeting with Isidora ===
A story of Pitirim is related in chapter 34 of Palladius' Lausaic History (written 419-420). According to Palladius, Pitirim one day received a vision from an angel while praying in the mountains.

Now an angel appeared to the holy Pitirim, an anchorite of high reputation who dwelt in Porphyrites, and said to him: "Why are you proud of yourself for being religious and dwelling in a place like this? Do you want to see a woman who is more religious than you?"

The angel told him to visit the monastery at Tabennisi (founded by Pachomius the Great), and there to find a woman who was more holy than himself. Pitirim did so and met Isidora, a woman of extreme humility among her fellow nuns. Pitirim admonished the other nuns for treating Isidora unkindly.

They were all amazed and said to him: "Father, do not let her insult you, she is dumb." Said Pitirim to them all: "You are dumb. For she is am Amma both of me and you."

== Verses ==
=== Troparion on Tone 8 ===
In thee, O Father, was preserved unimpaired that which is according to God's image; for thou didst take up the Cross and follow Christ. By thine actions thou hast taught us to despise the flesh for it passes away, but to care for the soul which is thing immortal. Wherefore thy spirit holy Pitirim rejoices with the angels.

=== Ode 6 ===
Irmos
Whirled about in the abyss of sin, I appeal to the unfathomable abyss of thy compassion, from corruption raise me up, O God.
When the Lord chastened Saint Pitirim for "traveling in the cities" mentally while living as a solitary, he was instructed to seek you, O Isidora, fool for Christ.
The nuns, seeing only foolishness, did not discern your unceasing prayer to Christ God whom you loved with your heart, soul, mind and strength. Focusing on the rags upon your head, they missed your resplendent crown of love.

=== Hymn of Praise ===
From the Prologue of Ohrid by Saint Nikolaj Velimirović.

In the desert, the ascetic Pitirim
Prays to God and asks himself:
In the world, is there anyone equal to me?
Then appeared, an angel of God,
Gently reproached Pitirim
In thoughts, you magnify yourself O Elder
As though, in the world, there is no better!
Come, follow me, O Elder Pitirim,
Come, follow me to see the aged woman,
Isidora makes herself a fool for Christ,
To see her and then to be amazed:
She, from God her heart does not separate,
All her thoughts, to God, she binds,
And not like you, who, in the body, are here,
And thoughts, in the ends of the world!
And all of her mortifications that you see
That by shame, of the woman to be ashamed!
And the wisdom of God that you glorify
Which, in the weeds, nurses the roses!

== Teachings ==
- Pitirim taught that to each person's passions there are corresponding demons which incite that passion in the person through different temptations. To escape from these demons and from evil thoughts, one must first free the heart from passions.
- Monks often told Pitirim of visions of demons appearing to them. He would say, "I am most afraid of demons, which nest pride, avarice, sensuality and other similar passions. These are the most dangerous demons and great care must be taken towards them."

== See also ==
- Desert Fathers
- Saint Isidora
- Anthony the Great
- Christian monasticism
- Serapion of Nitria (also a disciple of Anthony)
