= Thomas of Marga =

Patriarch of the Church of the East from 837 to 850

Thomas of Marga, (Classical Syriac: ܬܐܘܡܐ ܒܪ ܝܥܩܘܒ, Taomá bár Yaˁqub) was an East Syriac bishop and author of an important monastic history in Syriac, who flourished in the 9th century CE. He was born early in the century in the region of Salakh to the north-east of Mosul. As a young man he became in 832 a monk of the monastery of Beth 'Abhe, which was situated at the confluence of the Great Zab with one of its tributaries, about 25 miles east of Mosul. A few years later he was acting as secretary to Abraham, who had been abbot of Beth 'Abhe, and was patriarch of the Church of the East from 837 to 850.

At some date during these 13 years Thomas was promoted by Abraham to be bishop of the diocese of Marga in the same district as Beth 'Abhe, and afterwards he was further advanced to be a metropolitan of Beth Garmai, a district farther to the southeast in the mountains which border the Tigris basin. It was during the period of his life at Beth 'Abhe and his bishopric that he composed The Book of Governors, which is in the main a history of his own monastery, but includes lives of Christian holy men in other parts of Mesopotamia and the regions east of the Tigris. The work was probably planned in imitation of the famous Paradise of Palladius, the history of Egyptian monasticism which had become well known to Syriac-speaking Christians in the version of Anan-Isho (6th century).

The Book of Governors has been edited with an English translation and a copious introduction by E. W. Budge (2 vols., London, 1893; Google Books), who claims that "it occupies a unique position in Syriac literature, and it fully deserves the veneration with which it has been and is still regarded by all classes of Nestorians to whom it is known." It gives a detailed history of the great monastery of Beth 'Abhe during its three centuries of existence down to the author's time. It is full of interesting narratives of saintly men told in a naive and candid spirit, and it throws much light on the history of Christianity in the Persian dominions. There is a later edition by P. Bedjan (Paris, 1901).
