= Apollo of Piombino =

Greek bronze statue

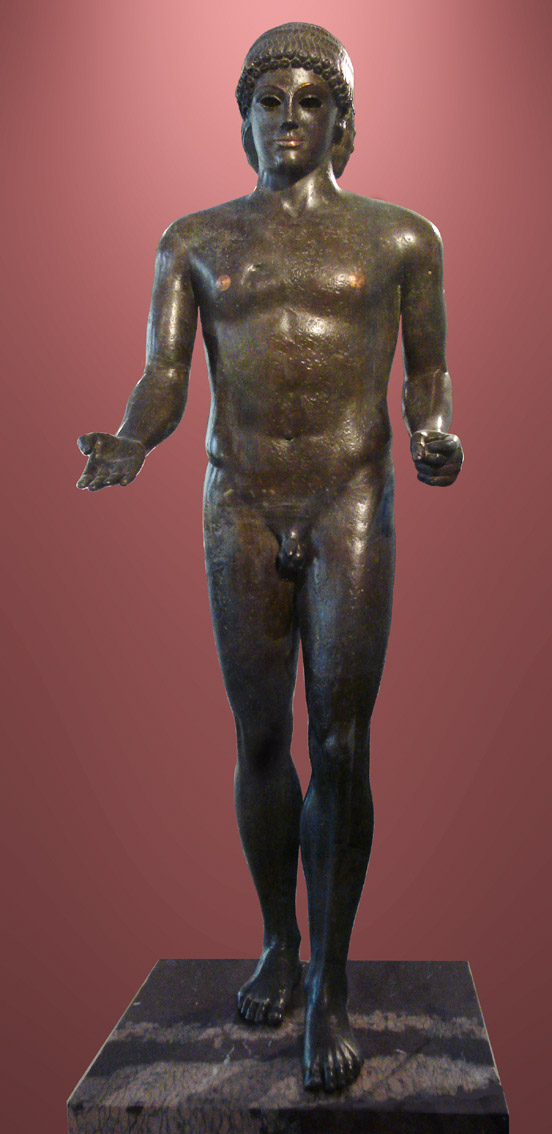
Apollo of Piombino

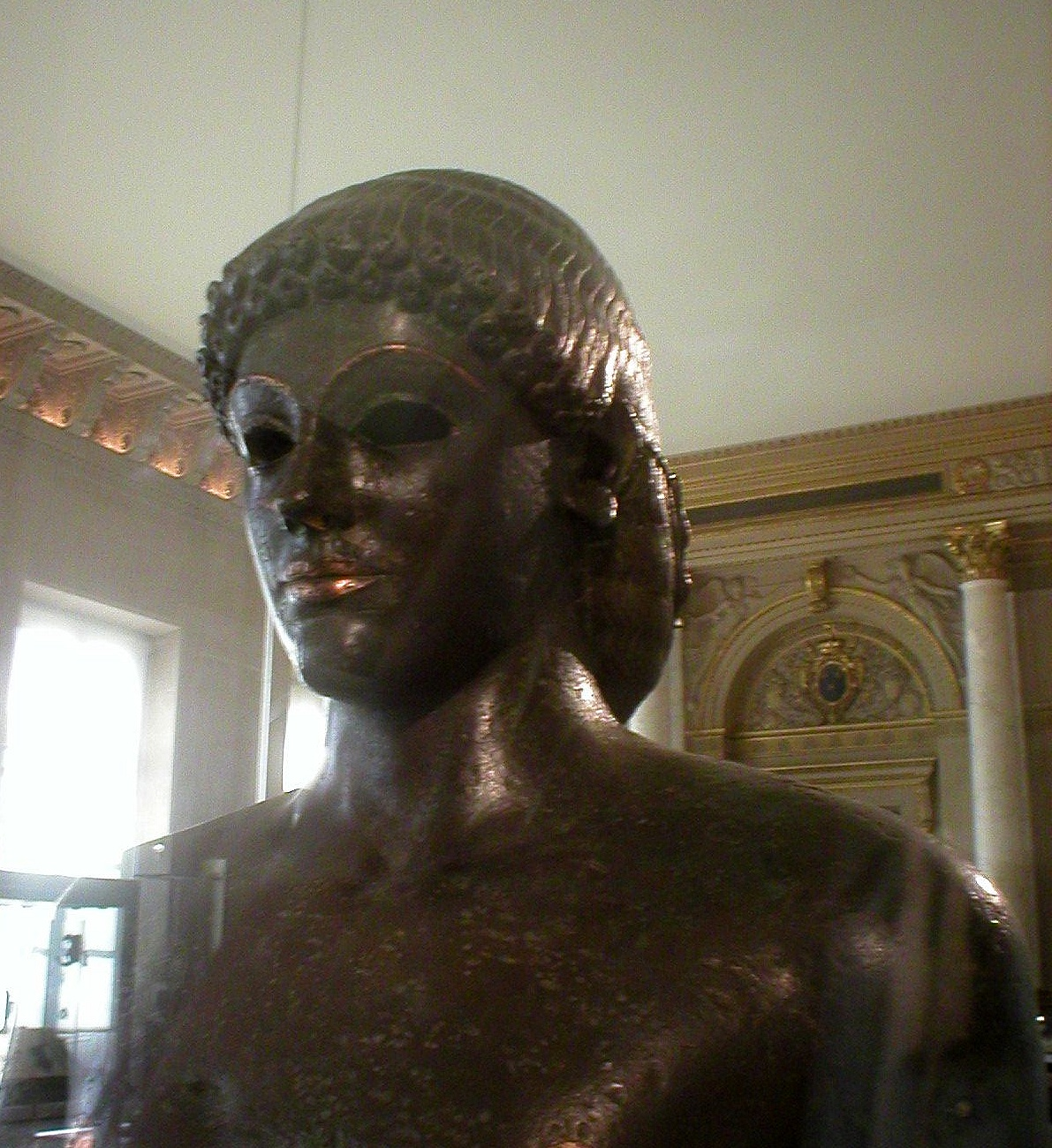
Close up of Apollo Piombino

The Apollo of Piombino or the Piombino Boy is a famous Greek bronze statuette in late Archaic style that depicts the god as a kouros or youth, or it may be a worshipper bringing an offering. The bronze is inlaid with copper for the boy's lips, eyebrows, and nipples. The eyes, which are missing, were of another material, perhaps bone or ivory.

== Style ==
It was found in 1832 at Piombino (Roman Populonia), in Etruria, in the harbor off the southwest point, and was purchased for the Musée du Louvre in 1834. Its archaic style led scholars like Reinhard Lullies and Max Hirmer to date it in the 5th century BCE and place its facture in Magna Graecia, the Hellenic culture area of southern Italy; Kenneth Clark illustrated it in The Nude (1956), Karl Schefold included it in Meisterwerke Griechischer Kunst 1960 and casts of it were to be found in university and museum study collections; one made by the Louvre has been returned to Piombino.

Italian archaeologist Brunilde Sismondo Ridgeway proved it to be an archaizing sculpture, of the kind designed to appeal to a Roman with refined tastes, with two features inconsistent with the characteristics of genuine archaic sculptures. The first discrepancy is a false inscription of archaic lettering inlaid in silver on the bottom of the left foot of the statue. It reads "...ος Αθαναια δεκαταν," translating to "...os dedicated this as a tithe to Athena." For unclear reasons, this statue of Apollo is dedicated to Athena, possibly Athena Lindia due its Rhodian origins. The second discrepancy between this statue and true archaic artworks is the lead tablet inscribed with the sculptor's names secreted inside the statue. Four pieces of this tablet were found when the sculpture was conserved in 1842. One piece was lost as is unrecorded, although drawings of the other three pieces survive. The entire tablet reads "...ηνοδο ...φων Ροδ[ι]ος εποο ...," meaning "[M]enodotos and ...phon of Rhodes made it." This inscription identifies the artists as Rhodian sculptors working in the 2nd or 1st centuries BCE, proving that it is not a genuine archaic Greek artwork. It is likely that the four pieces once formed a complete tablet, but they have since been broken along the creases where they had been folded. The lettering—which is not of a homogenous style throughout each inscription—was primarily inscribed using a chisel, although rounded letters were written using rounded tools. Records show that Menodotos was a Tyrian émigré who founded a workshop in the city of Rhodes. Archaeological evidence suggests that the multiple generations of the family of Menodotos worked as sculptors in the city. The Louvre's website adds that a work comparable to the Piombino Apollo was uncovered in 1977 in Pompeii, in the house of C. Julius Polybius, corroborates the hypothesis of an archaizing pastiche, made for a Roman client in the 1st century BCE.

Inscription on the left foot of the Piombino Apollo
Drawing by French archaeologist Desiré-Raoul Rochette

Drawing by French archaeologist, numismatist, and curator Adrien Prévost de Longpérier

Drawing by French archaeologist Jean-Antoine Letronne

== Description ==
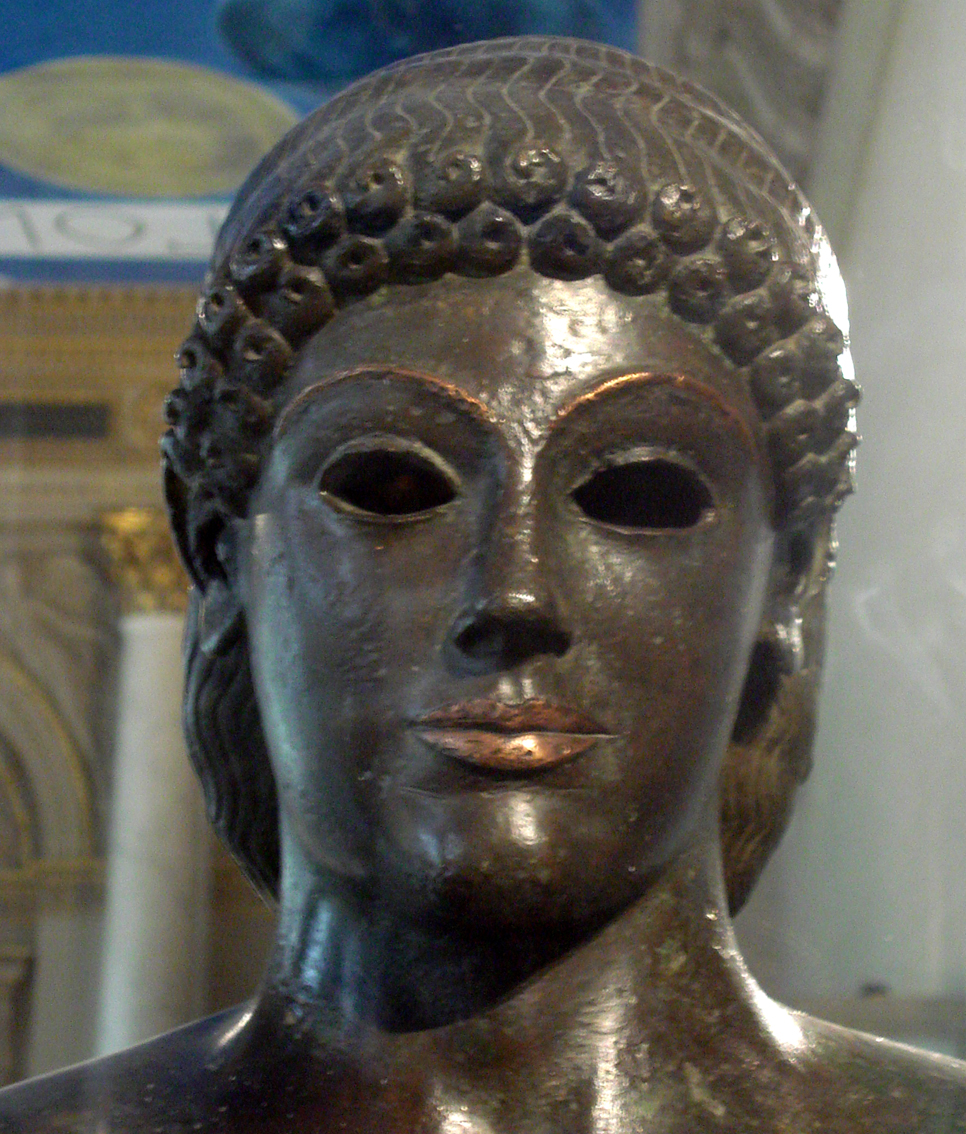
Head of the Piombino Apollo

In 2017, the sculpture was reexamined using X-radiography and endoscopic measures alongside the bare eye. This analysis revealed that the sculpture was cast in 9-10 distinct parts: the head, body, arms, legs, the anterior parts of the feet, and two fingers. It is likely that the legs were cast separately from the body, although the join-work rendered this aspect of the production unnoticeable. These components were joined through a flow-fusion welding process; the arms were joined to the body at their basins, the head and legs to the body through platform welding, and linear joins connected the feet to the legs.

The primary castings for the arms, body, legs, fingers, and head were made using a bronze composed of around 6% tin and 19.5% lead. Unalloyed copper with around 2% lead was used to make the lips, eyebrows, and nipples. The lips, eyebrows, nipples have uniquely high levels of iron compared to the rest of the statue, and the eyebrows specifically lack arsenic. For the welding process, a filler metal almost identical to the metals used for the primary castings; however, it differs at the joining point of the pinkie finger to the right hand and of the right arm to the body, both of which contain slightly more tin and less lead than the primary castings. The inscription on the foot is inlayed with silver that is itself alloyed by copper and gold, which constitute around 3% and 0.5% of the total substance respectively. At some point in antiquity, the fourth toe on the right was broken and repaired; the statue had a tenon inserted into the foot and the missing part placed on top of it. On this specific part of the statue, a unique alloy is used with only 12% lead and 4% tin. It is afflicted with high levels of arsenic, bismuth, zinc, and antimony compared to the rest of the statue, further proving that this section of the material was added-on later as a repair. Another, similar pattern of impurities is found in the weld join of the right arm, suggesting that it may also have been reworked as part of a repair.

Lost-wax casting techniques were also utilized to construct the statue. Wax was used to fill the insides of the finer, more precise details such as the nose, fingers, ears, and toes of the statue. It is likely that liquid wax was poured into the molds, which were then inverted to remove excess wax, providing the metal walls with a consistent width of 3-4 millimeters. In contrast to the rest of the statue, the wax-castings of the hair show more evidence of direct intervention; each strand of hair was engraved into the wax and corkscrew curls were carved into the ends of the hair on each side of the forehead. The neck contains a small bib-like shape that represents the only identified wax-to-wax join in the statue, suggesting that the body and head were once divided and then manually connected to each other during the production process at this point.

== References and Corresponding Notes ==
=== Bibliography ===
- Casement, William (2016-12-01). "Were the ancient Romans art forgers?" (PDF). Journal of Art Historiography. 15: 15–WC1. ISSN 2042-4752. Archived (PDF) from the original on September 7, 2024 – via Directy of Open Access Journals.
- Clark, Kenneth (1956). The Nude; a Study in Ideal Form. New York: Pantheon Books.
- Daehner, Jens M.; Lapatin, Kenneth; Spinelli, Ambra, eds. (2017-11-21). "A Technological Re-Examination of the Piombino Apollo". Artistry in Bronze: The Greeks and Their Legacy XIXth International Congress on Ancient Bronzes. J. Paul Getty Trust, The. doi:10.2307/jj.6142256.52. ISBN 978-1-60606-542-6.
- Dow, Sterling (1941). "A Family of Sculptors from Tyre". Hesperia: The Journal of the American School of Classical Studies at Athens. 10 (4): 351–360. doi:10.2307/146666. ISSN 0018-098X.
- Goodlett, Virginia C. (1991). "Rhodian Sculpture Workshops". American Journal of Archaeology. 95 (4): 669–681. doi:10.2307/505898. ISSN 0002-9114.
- Mattusch, Carol C. (2017), "When a Statue Is Not a Statue", in Daehner, Jens M.; Lapatin, Kenneth; Spinelli, Ambra (eds.), Artistry in Bronze, The Greeks and Their Legacy XIXth International Congress on Ancient Bronzes, Getty Publications, pp. 69–76, ISBN 978-1-60606-541-9
