= Cistern of Philoxenos =

Cistern of Byzantine Constantinople

- Interior of the cistern

- Location within Istanbul Fatih
- 41°0′27″N 28°58′28″E
- Location: Istanbul

The Cistern of Philoxenos (Greek: Κινστέρνα Φιλοξένου), or Binbirdirek Cistern, is a man-made subterranean reservoir in Istanbul, situated between the Forum of Constantine and the Hippodrome of Constantinople in the Sultanahmet district. It has been restored and is now visited as a tourist attraction. The entrance is located at İmran Öktem Sokak 4. Binbirdirek Cistern is the second largest cistern in Istanbul after the Basilica Cistern.

== Construction ==
The reservoir has a surface area of 3640 m^{2}, storing 40,000 m^{3} of water. The cistern is composed of a large hypostyle chamber supported by vaults. The 224 columns, each 14 to 15 meters tall, are made of marble from nearby Marmara Island. Each column is a superposition of two columns, joined by a marble ring. The floor of the cistern was later reinforced, so that only the upper column and a short sleeve of the lower column are thus visible. The original height can be seen in an excavated pond with four columns in the middle of the cistern. Most of the columns, and also the caps, are engraved with a Greek mason's mark.

== Restoration ==
The cistern was restored by Justinian I in the 6th century, after the Palace of Lausus was completely destroyed in a fire in 475. After the conquest of the city by the Ottomans in 1453, the cistern fell into disuse, and was forgotten until rediscovered during the construction of Fazli Pasha's palace on the same site in the 17th century.

In 1826, roughly 100 members of the Janissary Corps drowned after fleeing into the cistern during the Auspicious Incident.

== 1001 columns ==
The name "Binbirdirek" means "1001 Columns" in Turkish, although the true number of the columns is only 224. The difference is due to the Turkish expression, "binbir" (i.e. 1001), being a turn of phrase that is often used to express a large sum or array of something.

== Gallery ==
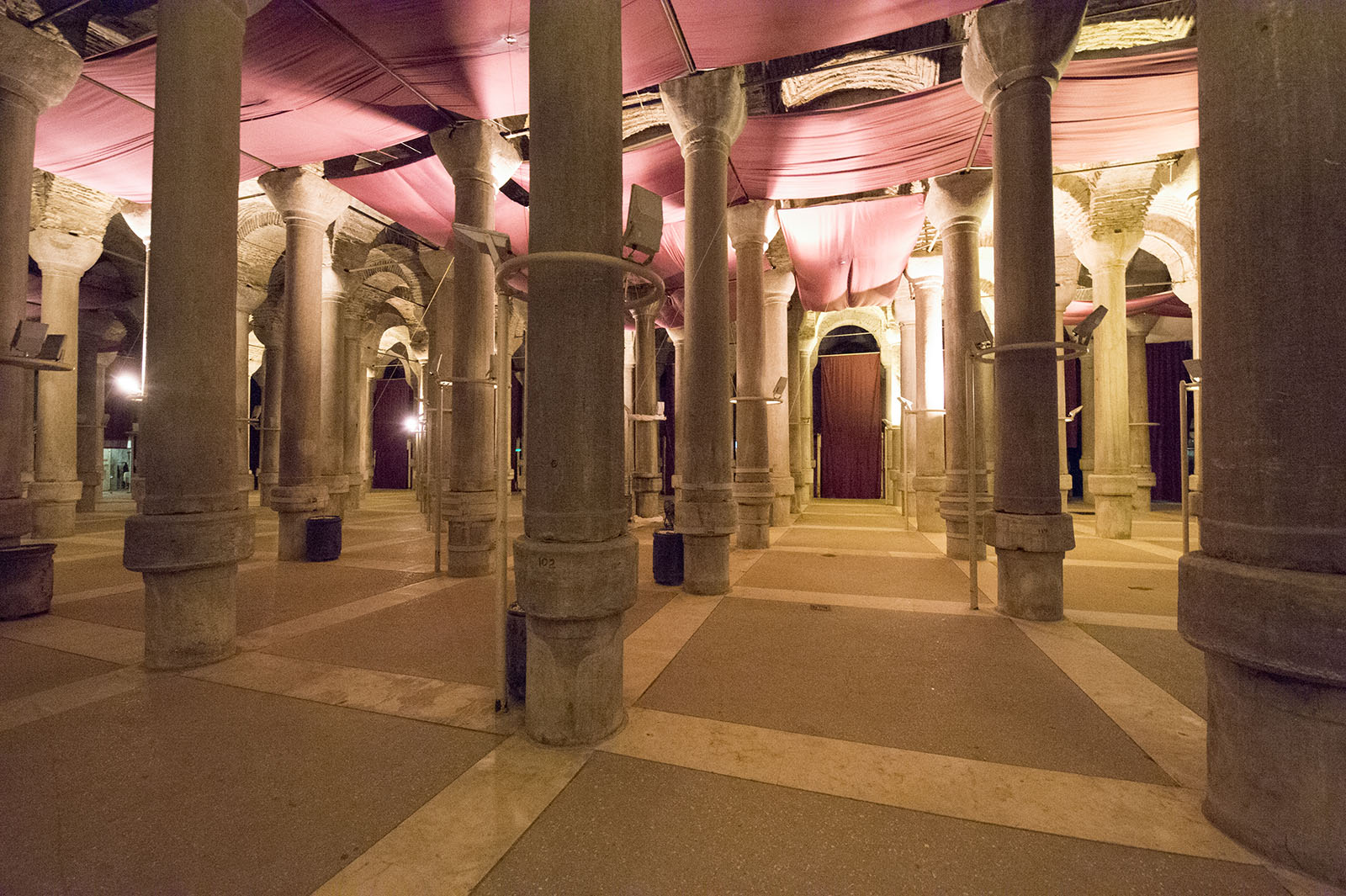
Cistern of Philoxenos general view

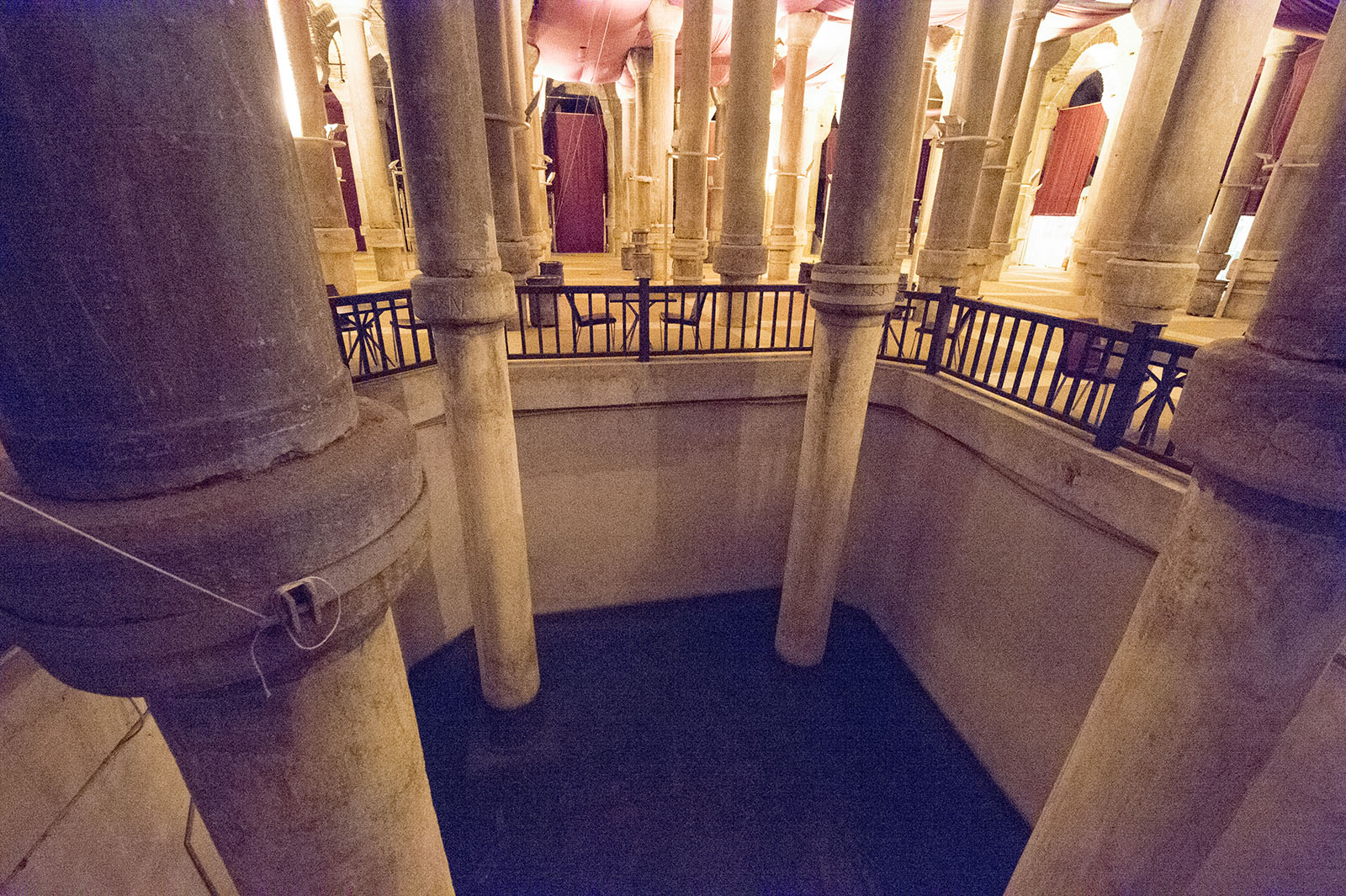
An excavated pool showing the original height of the double columns. The cistern was constructed under a palace, often identified as the Palace of Antiochos in the 5th century.

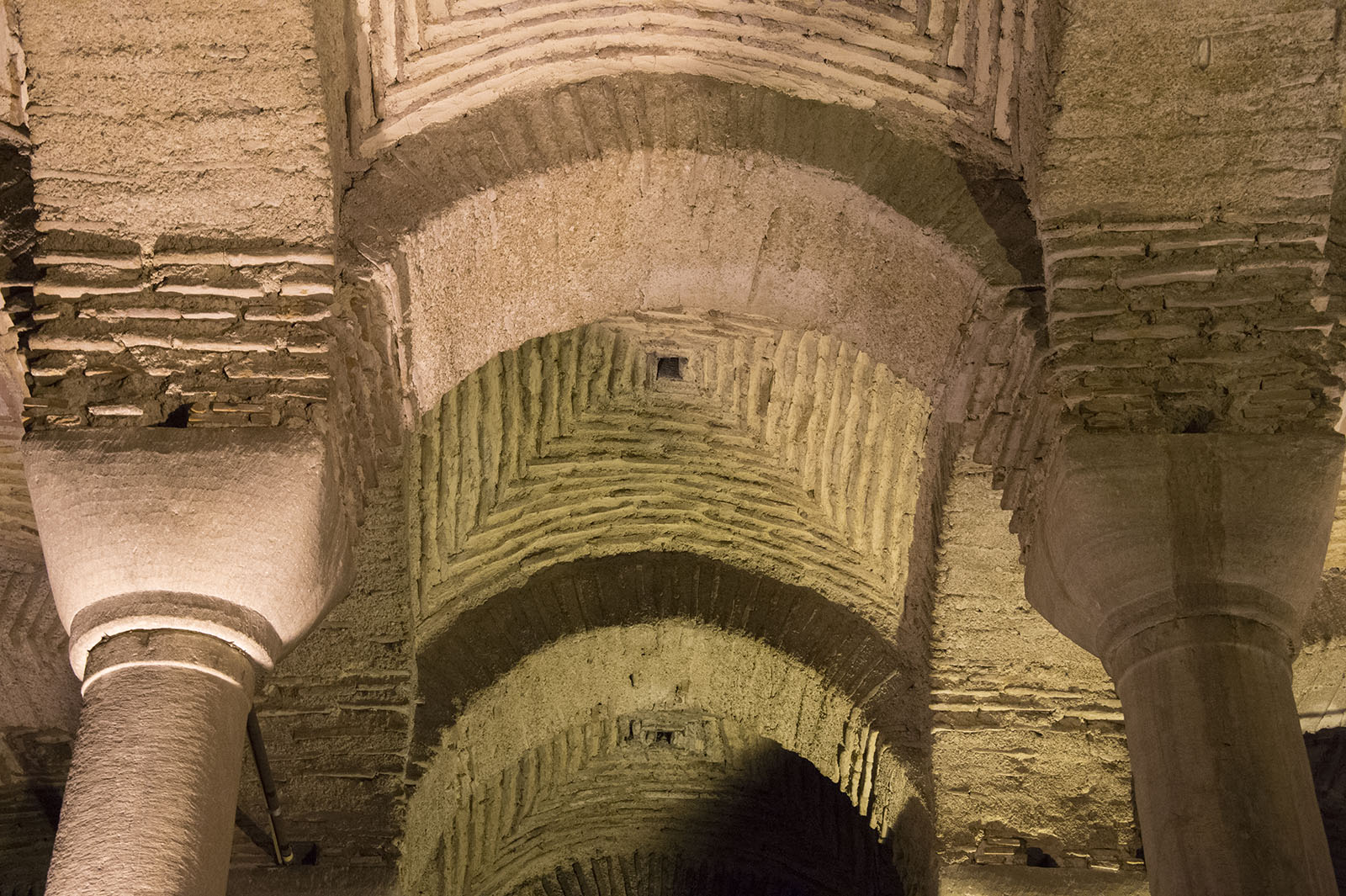
Cistern of Philoxenos ceiling

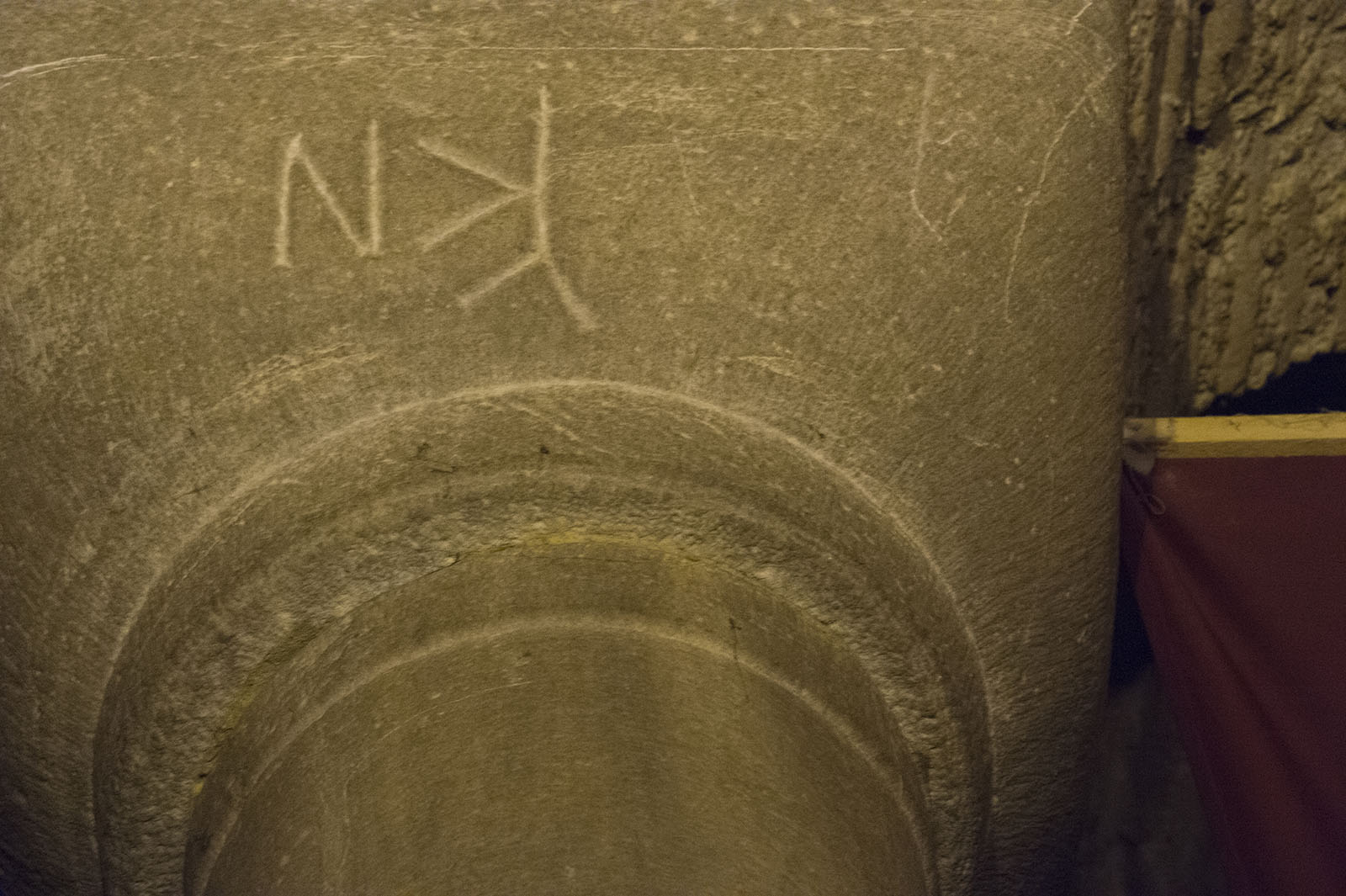
Cistern of Philoxenos Capital with mason's mark

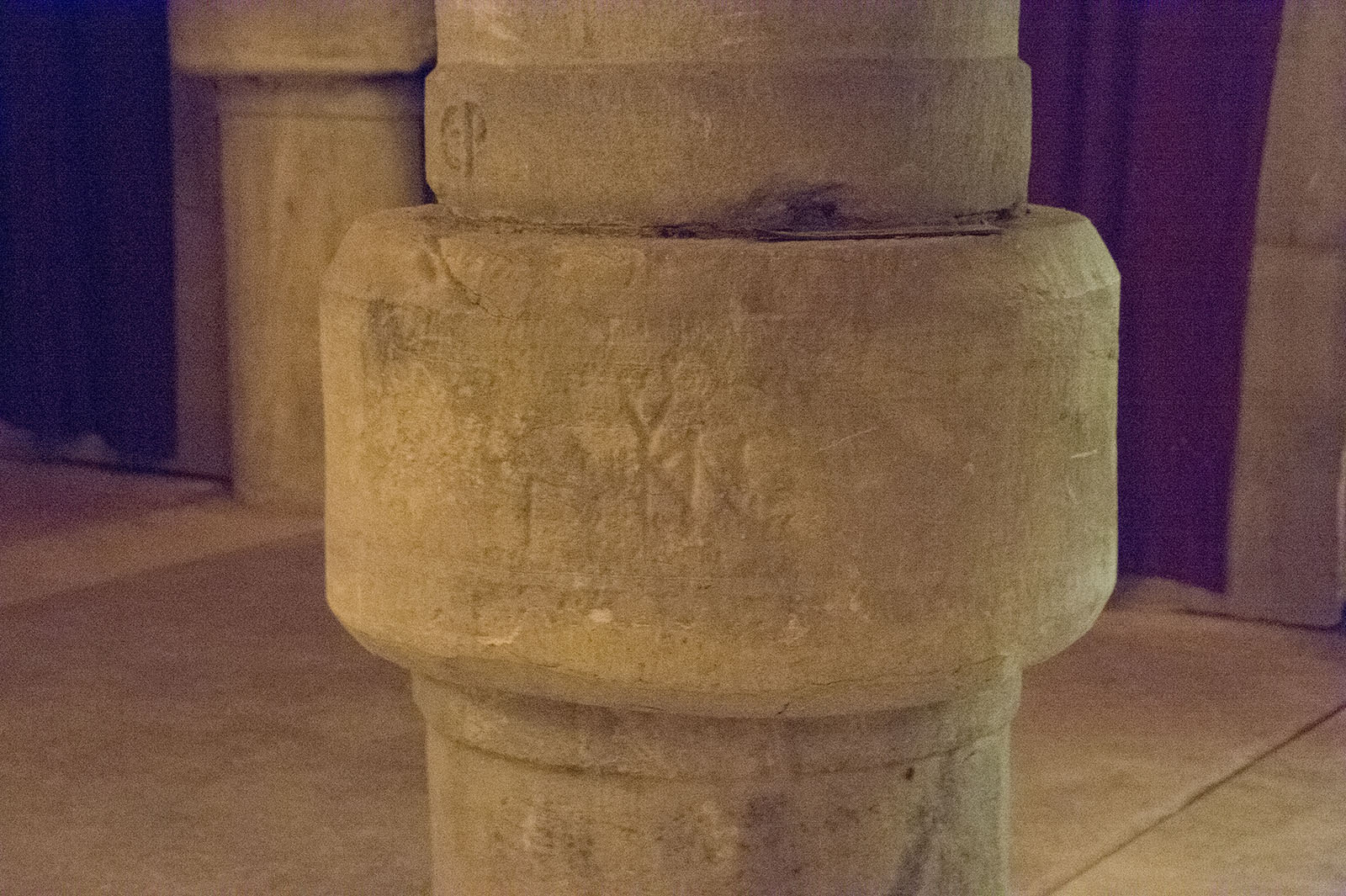
Cistern of Philoxenos Column with mason's mark

== See also ==
- List of Roman cisterns
- Ancient Roman and Byzantine domes

== Sources ==
- Kazhdan, Alexander (éd.), (1991). The Oxford Dictionary of Byzantium, 3 vols., Oxford University Press, (ISBN 0-19-504652-8), s. v. Constantinople, Monuments of : Cisterns, vol. 1, 518-519;
- Müller-Wiener, Wolfgang (1977). Bildlexikon zur Topographie Istanbuls: Byzantion, Konstantinupolis, Istanbul bis zum Beginn d. 17 Jh (in German). Tübingen: Wasmuth. ISBN 978-3-8030-1022-3.
