= Palace of Antiochos =

Coordinates: 41.0074°N 28.9751°E

The Palace of Antiochos (Greek: τὰ παλάτια τῶν Ἀντιόχου) was an early 5th-century palace in the Byzantine capital, Constantinople (modern Istanbul, Turkey). It has been identified with a palatial structure excavated in the 1940s and 1950s close to the Hippodrome of Constantinople, some of whose remains are still visible today. In the 7th century, a part of the palace was converted into the church—more properly a martyrion, a martyr's shrine—of St Euphemia in the Hippodrome (Ἀγία Εὐφημία ἐν τῷ Ἱπποδρομίῳ, Hagia Euphēmia en tō Hippodromiō), which survived until the Palaiologan period. Currently a hotel was constructed on top of the ruins but some traces of the palace can be seen under a glass floor at the dining hall.

== History ==
=== Antiochos's palace ===
The palace of Antiochos was constructed as a residence for Antiochos, a eunuch of Persian origin, who enjoyed considerable influence during the reign of Theodosius II (r. 402–450). As a cubicularius (chamberlain), he was tutor to the young emperor and eventually rose to the post of praepositus sacri cubiculi and the rank of patricius. His overbearing attitude and dominance over the young emperor caused his downfall (the date is disputed) by the emperor's sister, Pulcheria, but he was allowed to return to his palace and live there. He remained active in the capital's politics until he finally fell from grace and entered the clergy in ca. 439. Following this, his property, including the palace, was confiscated by the emperor.

The palace was first discovered in 1939, when frescoes depicting the life of Saint Euphemia were discovered northwest of the Hippodrome. Further excavations in 1942 by Alfons Maria Schneider uncovered a hexagonal hall opening to a semicircular portico, while excavations in 1951–52 under R. Duyuran uncovered a column base with the inscription "of the praepositus Antiochos", which allowed for the identification of the site. Based on the stamps on the bricks recovered from the site, J. Bardill proposes a date of construction not earlier than 430.

=== Church of Saint Euphemia ===
The Church of Saint Euphemia in the Hippodrome (also known as lying "in ta Antiochou", i.e. "the quarters/palaces of Antiochos") was established in the hexagonal hall probably sometime in the early 7th century, when the original church at Chalcedon was destroyed during the Sassanid Persian invasions, and the relics moved for safety to Constantinople. Originally the western chapel had frescoes depicting the martyrdom of Saint Euphemia, and the sanctuary had a canopy dome. During the Byzantine Iconoclasm, the building was secularized and allegedly converted into a store of arms and manure. According to tradition, the bones of the saint were ordered thrown into the sea by Emperor Leo III the Isaurian (ruled 717–741) or by his son, Constantine V (r. 741–775). They were however saved by two pious brothers and brought to the island of Lemnos, from where they were brought back in 796, after the end of the first Iconoclasm period, by Empress Eirene (r. 797–802). The church survived until the end of the Byzantine Empire, being redecorated in the late 13th century with frescoes in the Palaiologan style.

== Description ==
=== Original architecture of the palace ===
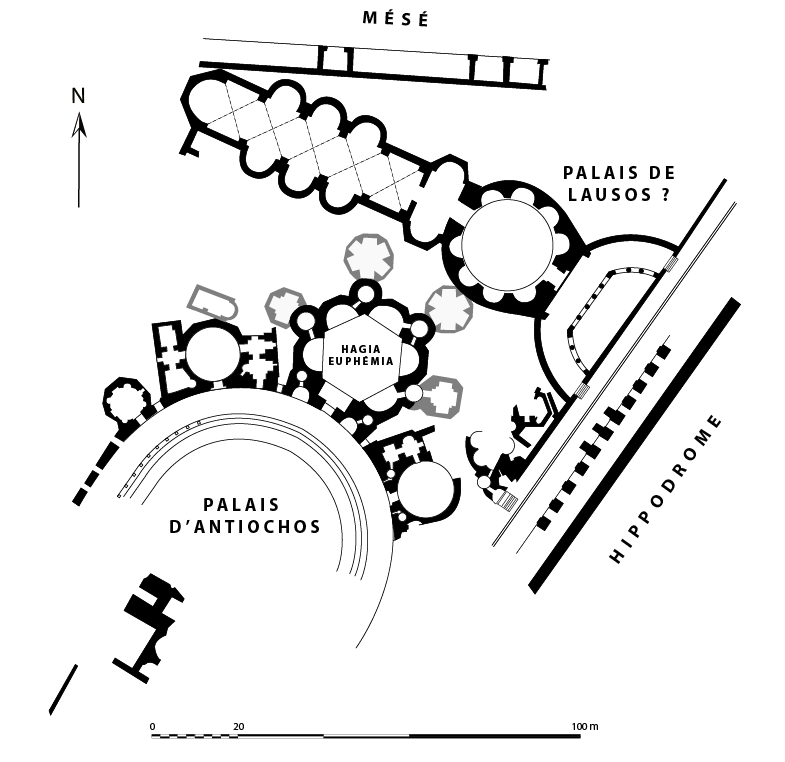
Outline of the Palace of Antiochos.

The original palace consisted of two sections, a southern and a northern. The southern one, inaccessible to the public today, featured the large apsed hexagonal hall which was later converted into the Church of Saint Euphemia, connected to a wide semicircular portico, some 60 m in diameter and enclosing a courtyard paved with marble. The hexagonal hall originally served probably as a dining hall (triclinium). The diameter of the hall is some 20 m, with each side of the hexagon 10.4 m wide. Each side featured an absidal niche, polygonal on the exterior and semicircular in the interior, each 7.65 m wide and 4.65 m deep, thus providing space for a semicircular bench (sigma or stibadium) and a dining table. Each apse also had a door that communicated with small circular rooms, situated between the apses. A marble pool was located in the center of the hall, a feature common in Late Antiquity. The hexagonal triclinium was flanked by other rooms, grouped along the outer curve of the great portico, including an elaborate vestibule with a circular room at its center.

The northern section, located between the street that ran along the western wall of the Hippodrome and the Mese thoroughfare, was until recently misidentified as the Palace of Lausus. It comprised a large rotunda of 20 m diameter with niches on the wall, which seems to have functioned as an audience hall for Antiochos. It was attached to a south-eastwards facing, C-shaped portico open to the street along the Hippodrome. A small bath house, also accessible from the street, lay next to the southern side of the portico. In the 5th century, when the palace was imperial property, an elongated hallway was added to the rotunda in the west, accessed through a double-apsed vestibule. Its shape points to its use as a triclinium. It was 52.5 m long and 12.4 m wide with an apse at its end, while in the 6th century, six apses were added on each of its long sides.

=== Conversion into a church ===
When the hexagonal hall was converted into a church, several modifications were made. The bēma was placed to the right of the original entrance, in the southeastwards-looking apse, and another entrance was opened up in the opposite apse. The original gate remained in use, but was narrowed at some later point. Two further gates were opened in the two northern circular rooms, to which two mausolea were eventually attached.

The excavations uncovered the remains of the synthronon (seats for the clergy, a cathedra), the altar foundation, the chancel barrier, and a solea (an elevated podium). No evidence of an ambo survives, but its presence is possible, in line with other early Byzantine churches of the city. Most of these sculptural remains display typical 6th-century features, such as marble sculptures inlaid with glass, but the epistyle dates from the restoration of the church in 797.

=== Frescoes ===
A series of frescoes, dating to the late 13th century, survive on the southwestern wall of the church, and can be seen behind a protective glass. Fourteen of them form a cycle narrating the life and martyrdom of Saint Euphemia, while another fresco depicts the martyrdom of the Forty Martyrs of Sebaste, a theme unique among the churches of the capital.

== See also ==
- Ancient Roman and Byzantine domes

== Sources ==
- Ball, Amanda (2008-05-26). "Church of St. Euphemia". Encyclopedia of the Hellenic World, Constantinople. Archived from the original on 2015-12-06.
- Bardill, Jonathan (2004). Brickstamps of Constantinople, Volume 1. Oxford University Press. ISBN 978-0-19-925524-5.
- Cameron, Averil; Herrin, Judith (1984). Constantinople in the early eighth century: the Parastaseis syntomoi chronikai (introduction, translation, and commentary). Brill Archive. ISBN 978-90-04-07010-3.
- Kazhdan, Alexander, ed. (1991). Oxford Dictionary of Byzantium. Oxford University Press. ISBN 978-0-19-504652-6.
- Kostenec, Jan (2008-07-26). "Palace of Antiochos". Encyclopedia of the Hellenic World, Constantinople. Archived from the original on 2015-12-08.
- Martindale, John R.; Jones, A.H.M.; Morris, J. (1992). The Prosopography of the Later Roman Empire, Volume II: A.D. 395–527. Cambridge University Press. ISBN 978-0-521-20159-9.
