= Palace of Lausus =

5th-century building in Constantinople

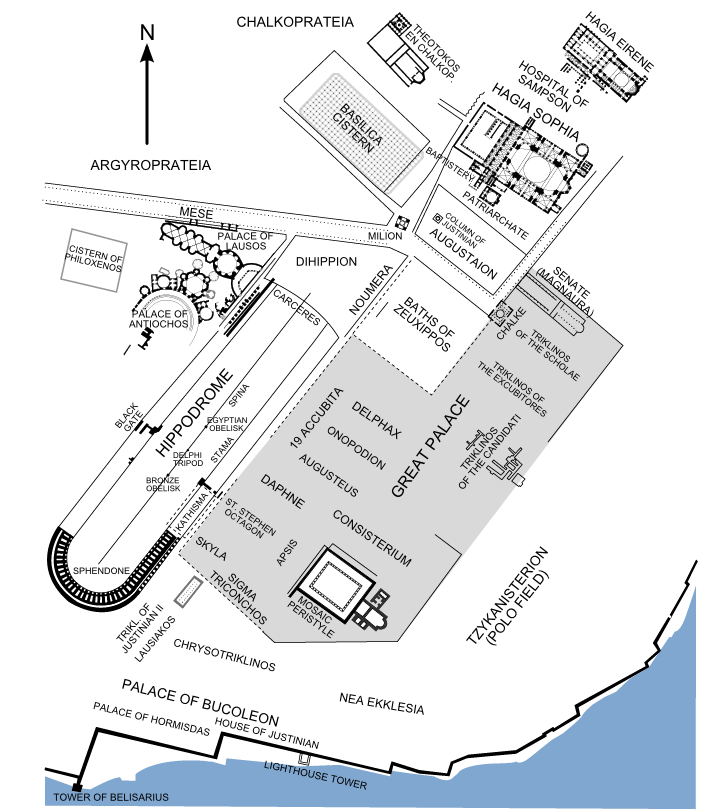
The aristocratic district of Constantinople, with the Palace of Lausus located just west of the Hippodrome.

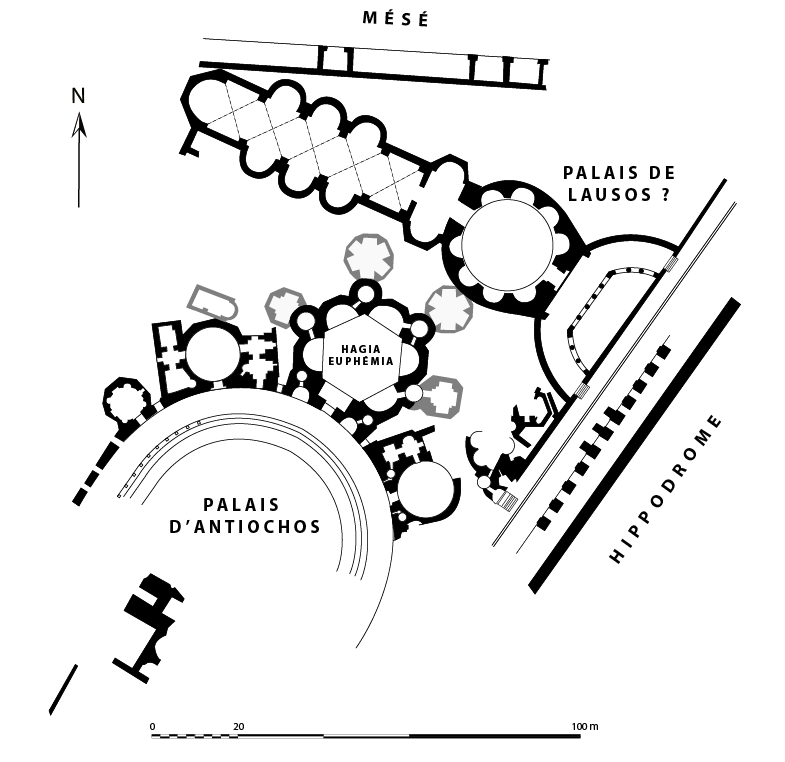
Outline of the Palace of Antiochos. Its northern wing is often identified as the Palace of Lausus.

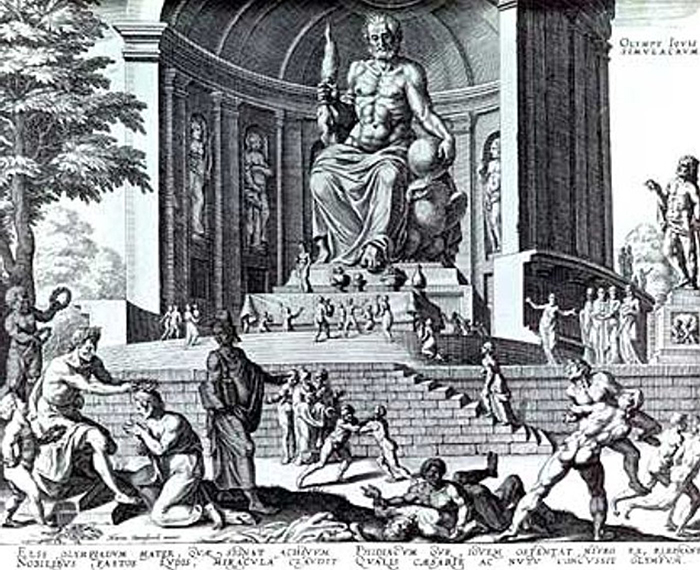
A reconstruction of Phidias' Zeus, from 1572

The Palace of Lausus or Lausos, also known as the Lauseion (Greek: Λαυσεῖον), was a 5th-century building located in Constantinople that was acquired and owned by the eunuch Lausus.

== Lausus ==
Lausus, who had formerly served as a eunuch in the court of Theodosius II, became the imperial chamberlain sometime around 420. He was described in a letter by the bishop of Caesarea as being charitable to the poor, but also being very wealthy and owning a fine estate. Whilst he is reported to have lost his position as imperial chamberlain to Macrobius only two years after promotion, he may have regained the title ten years or so later following recommendation by Cyril of Alexandria, re-establishing his wealth.

== Description of the palace ==
=== Collection ===
The Palace of Lausus was renowned throughout Constantinople for the vast collection of heroic and mythological statues that its owner housed within its walls. Lausus amassed this huge collection from eastern temples that were being sacked and emptied during the reign of Theodosius – and, as such, his collection was likely the most diverse to have existed in Constantinople at the time. Lausus' collection of pagan statues was the first that was dispassionately assembled on purely aesthetic and historical grounds, even though he was reportedly a devout Christian. Foremost amongst his collection was the Statue of Zeus at Olympia carved by Phidias in circa 500 BC (one of the Seven Wonders of the Ancient World) and Praxiteles' Aphrodite of Cnidus. Lausus is also known to have owned the Hera of Samos and the Athena of Lindos, as well as statues of both Eros and Kairos. Reports indicate that Lausus had arranged his collection in a certain order. The aforementioned statue of Zeus was located in an apse at the far end of the hall, with Eros and Kairos at his side. One wall was dedicated to sculptures of goddesses, the other of animals.

=== Location ===
The exact location of the Palace of Lausus in Constantinople is a matter of debate, although it is generally accepted that the Palace was connected to the western flank of the Hippodrome by a rotunda, and that it was adjacent to the Palace of Antiochos. It was also very close to the Mese, the central thoroughfare of Constantinople, that led from the Augustaeum to the Golden Gate. See the map on the right for a more detailed analysis.

=== Destruction ===
Both Zonaras and Cedrenus report that the Palace of Lausus, along with much of the city, was destroyed by fire in 475. Lausus' entire collection was lost to the blaze.

The fire also destroyed the beautiful palace of Lausus and the statues therein, the Hera of Samos, the Athena of Lindos, and the Aphrodite of Cnidos, famous masterpieces of art

— Zonaras

...conflagration in the City which destroyed its most flourishing part... [it] also destroyed the porticoes on either side of the street Mesê and the excellent offerings of Lausus: for many ancient statues were set up there, namely the famous one of the Aphrodite of Cnidus....The fire extended as far as the Forum of the great Constantine, as it is called.

— Cedrenus

The Palace's destruction occurred long after Lausus' death, which had transpired some thirty years earlier, around 436.

=== Remains ===
Today, the Cistern of Philoxenos is located beneath the site where the Palace of Lausus is commonly accepted to have stood. The ruins of the palace of Antiochos still remain on the site today, as does the rubble from the rotunda joining the Palace of Lausus to the Hippodrome.
