= Temple of Athena Lindia =

Sanctuary in Rhodes

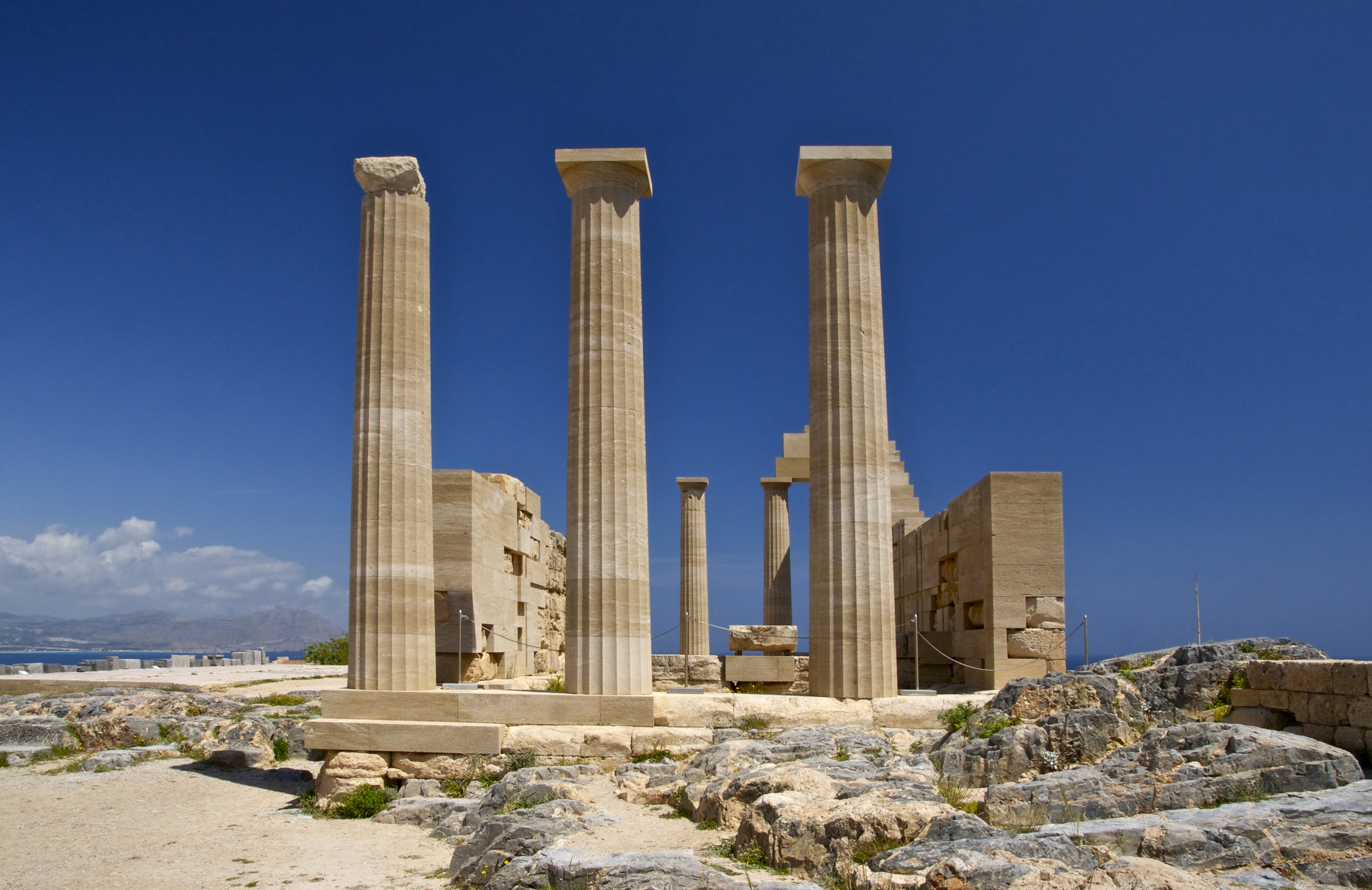
The ruins of the temple today

The Temple of Athena Lindia was a sanctuary in Lindos in Rhodes, dedicated to the goddess Athena. It was a significant Pan-Hellenic shrine of Athena and arguably the regional center of her cult.

== History ==
The sanctuary was situated at the acropolis in the city of Lindos in Rhodes, which was at that time the capital of the island. Prior to the foundation of the temple, the site appears to have been the place of the cult of a local goddess. It was built above a natural cave in the cliff, which may have been a previous cult place.

The first temple is dated to the 6th century BC. It was likely built by Cleobulus. The cult statue of Athena Lindia has been reconstructed from the votive statuettes as a seated figure of Athena with a polos crown.

The temple was burned in 342 BC, and replaced by a new temple in the late 4th-century BC. It was built in the Doric style. It was 7.75 x 21.65 m. The new cult statue was a standing figure of Athena carrying a shield, but wearing a polos rather than a helmet; as it was fastened by the wall of the cella, it may have been over life-size.

The fame of the temple is confirmed by the fact that Alexander the Great and many of his successors offered sacrifices there, and dedicated weapons after victories. Many of its votive gifts were famous and mentioned in the Temple Chronicle, such as works of Boethus and painter Parrhasios of Ephesus.

=== Mythology ===
The island of Rhodes was noted as a significant place for the cult of Athena in ancient times, and the sanctuary and cult of her in Rhodes are mentioned alongside to that in Athens. Rhodes was an important place in the myth of the birth of Athena, and it was said that:

Gold rained on the island [of Rhodes] at the time when Athena was born from the head of Zeus.

According to legend, the temple was founded by Danaus and the Danaïdes. According to Pseudo-Apollodorus (2 cd-Century BC), the temple was founded by Danaus, who dedicated a statue to Athena Lindia in his gratitude for her assistance in helping him construct a ship, by which he could help his daughters to escape: "Danaus, in fear of the sons of Aigyptos, under Athena's supervision built a ship (the first man to do so), put his daughters [the 50 Danaïdes] on board and escaped. Putting in at Rhodes, he dedicated the statue of Athena Lindia. From there he went to Argos." Strabo described the temple as founded by the Danaides rather than their father: "In Lindos there is a famous temple of Athena Lindia, founded by the daughters of Danaüs." According to Callimachus, the cult image of Athena put in place by Danaus was originally a xoanon before it was replaced by a statue, which indicates that the temple was of considerable antiquity.

Pindar described the legends around the temple in the 5th-century BC:

The land circled by the sea [Rhodes], where once the great king of the gods [Zeus] showered upon the city snowflakes of gold; in the day when the skilled hand of Hephaistos wrought with his craft the axe, bronze-bladed, whence from the cleft summit of her father's brow Athene sprang aloft, and pealed the broad sky her clarion cry of war. And Ouranos (Heaven) trembled to hear, and Mother Gaia (Earth). Then was it too the great god Hyperionides Helios the sun], giver of light to mortal men, this task to his beloved sons [i.e. the Heliadai of Rhodes] enjoined to ensure well hereafter : that they first to the goddess built a shining altar, and founding holy rites of sacrifice, make glad the heart of Zeus, and the maid of the sounding spear. Now Reverence, the daughter of Forethought, gives to men virtue and valour's joy. And yet comes too, on stealthy wing, that cloud of forgetfulness, drawing our baffled minds off from the straight road of their acts' intent. For they mounted aloft, but carried in their hands no seed of burning flame, but on the city's height [i.e. the acropolis of Lindos] founded a precinct without holy fire. Yet for these men Zeus brought the saffron cloud, and rained flood of gold, and the grey-eyed goddess herself endowed them the gift of skill, that of all men on earth, their hands in craft excelling have the mastery. And the roads acarried their worked images of life and movement, and widespread was their renown.

=== Cult ===
The cult of Athena on Rhodes differed somewhat from the cult in other parts of Greece, as it required the burning of the entrails from the sacrificial animals on the altar, an act which may have been unique for Rhodes. Philostratus the Elder describe the cult on the sanctuary in 3rd century:

The Birth of Athena . . . Two peoples are already sacrificing to Athena [i.e. on the day of her birth] on the acropolis of two cities, the Athenians and the Rhodians, one on the land and one on the sea, [sea-born] and earth-born men; the former offer fireless sacrifices that are incomplete, but the people of Athens offer fire, as you see yonder, and the savour of burnt flesh. The smoke is represented as fragrant and as rising with the savour of the offerings. Accordingly the goddess has come to the Athenians as to men of superior wisdom who make excellent sacrifices. For the Rhodians, however, as we are told, gold flowed down from heaven and filled their houses and their narrow streets, when Zeus caused a cloud to break over them, because they also gave heed to Athena. The divinity Ploutos also stands on their acropolis, and he is represented as a winged being who has descended from the clouds, and as golden because of the substance in which he has been made manifest.

=== Archeology ===
The sanctuary was excavated by the Italian archaeologists Maiuri and Jacopi in 1910–1932, and then by the Danish archaeologists K.F. Kinch and Chr. Blinkenberg.

== See also ==
- Ancient Greek temple
- List of Ancient Greek temples
