= Lausus (eunuch) =

5th-century Byzantine eunuch

Lausus or Lausos (c. 400 AD. – c. 450 AD) was a eunuch of the court of Theodosius II, famous for acquiring a palace and a large collection of art and sculptures. He also served as imperial chamberlain (praepositus sacri cubiculi) between 420 and 422 AD. The Historia Lausiaca, an account of the lives and feats of the most pre-eminent ascetics in Egypt, the desert fathers, was dedicated to him.

The Palace of Lausus, destroyed in a fire in 475, was supplied by the now-preserved Binbirdirek Cistern in Istanbul.
