= Lausiac History =

5th-century Christian texts

A page from the Lausiac History in a 14th-century Greek manuscript

The Lausiac History (Koine Greek: Ἡ Λαυσαϊκή Ἱστορία, romanized: E Lavsaike Istoria) is a seminal work archiving the Desert Fathers (early Christian monks who lived in the Egyptian desert) written in 419–420 AD by Palladius of Galatia, at the request of Lausus, chamberlain at the court of the Byzantine Emperor Theodosius II.

The text covers the lives of Desert Fathers and Mothers, and stories designed to instruct audiences on how to best avoid sin.

Originally written in Greek, the Lausiac History was so popular that it was soon translated into Arabic, Armenian, Coptic, Geʽez, Latin, Syriac, and Sogdian.

== History ==
The book was popular among monks all over the East, who appear to have added to it considerably in transcribing it. The first edition was a Latin version by Gentian Hervetus. A shorter Greek text was published by Johannes Meursius (Leyden, 1616), and a longer one by Fronton du Duc, and a still more complete one by J. Cotelerius. This longer version contains the text of Rufinus. Butler, Preuschen, and others think that the shorter text (of Meursius) is Palladius's authentic work, the longer version being interpolated. Amélineau holds that the longer text is all Palladius's work, and that the first thirty-seven chapters (about the monks of Lower Egypt) are mainly an account of what the author saw and heard, though even here he has also used documents. But he thinks the second part (about Upper Egypt) is merely a compilation from a Coptic or Greek document which Rufinus also used; so that Palladius's visit to Upper Egypt must be a literary fiction. But the shorter text itself exists in various forms. A Syrian monk, Anan-Isho, living in the sixth-seventh centuries in Mesopotamia, translated the Lausiac History into Syriac with further interpolations. At one time the Lausiac History was considered a compilation of imaginary legends. Roman Catholic scholars at the beginning of the twentieth century argued that it was also a serious source on Egyptian monasticism.

== Liturgical usage ==
In the Eastern Orthodox Church (the Byzantine Rite) the Lausiac History is read at matins on the weekdays of Great Lent as two of the patristic readings, after the third kathisma and after the third ode of the canon.

== An extract from the introduction ==
"In the fourth and fifth centuries of our era Egypt had come to be regarded with great reverence throughout Christendom as a Holy Land of piety.

"Pilgrims came from all parts to visit the saints who lived there, and several wrote descriptions of what they saw and heard, which are among the most interesting documents of the early Church. Palestine was so near that it was usually included in their tour; the glamour of its sacred sites, which remains with us still when that of Egypt has faded into oblivion, was already potent. But Palestine was clearly second to Egypt in the affections of the pilgrims.

"[As] expressed by Chrysostom ... Egypt ... was destined to be more fervent than any other, to have its towns and even its deserts peopled by armies of saints living the life of angels, and to boast the greatest, after the apostles, of all saints, the famous Antony.

"Palladius, ... made a pilgrimage to this holy land, like so many others, and stayed there many years. ... The character of the man stands out clearly in the History, He was sincere, simple-minded and not a little credulous. His deep religious fervour, of the ascetic type, needless to say, appears throughout the book."

== People ==
The Lausiac History contains descriptions and narratives of various monks, abbots, and saints, including:

- Isidore
- Dorotheos
- Potamiainê
- Didymus
- Alexandra
- Amoun of Nitria
- Ôr
- Pambô
- Ammônios
- Benjamin
- Apollonius
- Paêsios and Isaiah
- Macarius the Younger
- Nathanael
- Macarius the Egyptian
- Macarius of Alexandria
- Moses the Ethiopian
- Paul
- Eulogius
- Paul the Simple
- Pachôn
- Stephen of Libya
- Valens
- Hêron
- Ptolemy
- Elijah
- Dorotheus
- Piamoun
- Pachomius and disciples at Tabennesi
- John of Lycopolis (Asyut)
- Poseidon
- Serapion Sindonios
- Evagrius Ponticus
- Piôr
- Ephraim
- Julian of Edessa
- Adolios
- Innocent
- Philoromos
- Melania the Elder
- Chronius and Paphnoutius
- Elpidius
- Sisinnius
- Gaddana
- Elijah
- Sabas
- Abram
- Silvania
- Olympia
- Candida and Gelasia
- Ammas Talis and Taôr
- Colluthus (virgin and martyr)
- Melania the Younger
- Pammachius
- Juliana
- Hippolytus
- Count Verus
- Magna

== See also ==
- Desert Mothers
- Sayings of the Desert Fathers

== Bibliography ==
- Palladius of Galatia (1907). The Paradise . Translated by Ernest Alfred Wallis Budge. Chatto & Windus.
- Meyer, Robert T. Palladius: The Lausiac History. ACW 34. New York: Newman Press, 1965; reprint: Paulist Press.
- Vivian, Tim. "Coptic Palladiana I: The Life of Pambo." Coptic Church Review 20, no. 3 (1999): 66–95.
- Vivian, Tim. "Coptic Palladiana II: The Life of Evagrius." Coptic Church Review 21, no. 1 (2000): 8–23.
- Vivian, Tim. "Coptic Palladiana III: The Life of Macarius of Egypt." Coptic Church Review 21, no. 3 (2000): 82–109.
- Vivian, Tim. "Coptic Palladiana [IV]: St. Macarius of Alexandria." Coptic Church Review 22, no. 1 (2001): 2–22.
