= Palladius of Galatia =

Early Christian chronicler (363–420s)

Saint Palladius of Galatia
- Born: c. 363 AD; Galatia (modern-day Turkey)
- Died: 420s AD; Aspuna (modern-day Turkey)
- Venerated in: Oriental Orthodox Churches
- Feast: November 29

Palladius of Galatia (Greek: Παλλάδιος Γαλατίας) was a Christian chronicler and the bishop of Helenopolis in Bithynia. He was a devoted disciple of Saint John Chrysostom. He is best remembered for his work, the Lausiac History. He was also the author of the Dialogue on the Life of Chrysostom.

Palladius is a saint in the Coptic Orthodox Church and in the Syrian Orthodox Church, wherein he is given the honorific title "The Solitary". His feast day is November 29.

== Life ==
=== Early life ===
Palladius was born in Galatia in 363 or 364. He dedicated himself to the monastic life in 386 or soon thereafter, residing in the Mount of Olives.

=== Travels ===
Palladius travelled to Egypt to meet the prototypical Desert Fathers (Christian monks). In 388, he arrived in Alexandria. Around 390 he passed on to Nitria in Egypt, visiting the famous monk Or of Nitria. A year later, he travelled southwest to Kellia, an Egyptian Christian monastic community spread out over many square kilometers in the Nitrian Desert about 40 miles south of Alexandria.

=== Later life and ordination ===
After his travels, his health deteriorated and he went to Palestine in search of a cooler climate. In 400 he was ordained the bishop of Helenopolis in Bithynia, and soon became involved in controversies which centred around St. John Chrysostom. In 405 he again travelled to Rome to testify that Chrysostom was not a heretic. Because of this, he was exiled by emperor Arcadius for six years in Syene, during which time he wrote his biography of St. John Chrysostom. In 412 or 413 he was restored to the episcopate, now being the bishop of Aspuna (Galatia).

His primary work was written in 419–420 and was called the Lausiac History (being composed for Lausus, chamberlain at the court of Theodosius II) which is also titled The Lives of the Friends of God. This history detailed Egyptian and Middle Eastern Christian monasticism.

Palladius died some time in the second decade of the fifth century AD in his jurisdiction of Aspuna.

== Editions ==
- Palladio: La storia Lausiaca [Palladius: The Lausiac History]. Critical text and commentary by G. J. M. Bartelink, translation by Marino Barchiesi. Vite dei Santi, vol. 2. Verona: Mondadori, 1974.
- Palladius: Dialogue sur la vie de Jean Chrysostome [Palladius: Dialogue on the Life of John Chrysostom]. 2 volumes. Sources chrétiennes, vol. 341/342. Paris: Éd. du Cerf, 1988, ISBN 2-204-02718-9 and ISBN 2-204-02920-3.
- Die lateinische Übersetzung der Historia Lausiaca des Palladius. Textausgabe mit Einleitung [The Latin translation of the Historia Lausiaca of Palladius. Edition with Introduction]. By Adelheid Wellhausen. Patristische Texte und Studien, vol. 51. Berlin: De Gruyter, ISBN 3-11-016710-7.
- Palladius von Helenopolis: Historia Lausiaca / Geschichten aus dem frühen Mönchtum [Palladius of Helenopolis: Lausiac History]. Introduction, edition, translation and notes by Adelheid Hübner. Fontes Christiani, vol. 67. Freiburg: Herder, 2016, ISBN 978-3-451-30970-0.
- Palladius von Helenopolis: Dialogus de Vita Joannis Chrysostomi / Dialog über das Leben des Johannes Chrysostomus [Palladius of Helenopolis: Dialogue on the Life of John Chrysostom]. Introduction, edition, translation and notes by Adelheid Hübner. Fontes Christiani, vol. 90. Freiburg: Herder, 2021, ISBN 978-3-451-32937-1.
