= January 2 =

January 2 this year in various calendars
- Friday, 2 January 2026
Akan	Kurufie
Armenian	16 Arach 1475
Aztec	Huei Tozoztli 12, 6 Xōchitl
Babylonian	12 Kislimu, 2336 SE
Balinese pawukon	Menga, Pasah, Menala, Wage, Paniron, Sukra of Krulut, Yama, Urungan, Pandita
Bengali	18 Poush, BS 1432
Chinese	Yang Fire Rat・Ghost Mansion; Wood Snake Year, Month 11, Day 14 (Dongzhi, 3 days until Xiaohan)
Common Era	2 January 2026 CE
Coptic	24 Koiak, AM 1742
Egyptian	21 Pachon, 2774 NE
Ethiopian	24 Tākḫśāś, 2018 Amätä Məhrät
French Republican	Décade II, Tridi de Nivôse de l'Année 234 de la République
Gregorian	2 January, AD 2026
Hebrew	13 Tevet, AM 5786
Hindu	Mṛgaśiras・Śukla; Solar: 18 Pauṣa, 1947 SE; Lunisolar: Caturdaśī, Śukla pakṣa of Pauṣa, 2082 VE; Siddhārthin・5126 KY・1,872,577
Icelandic	Föstudagur, 10 Mörsugur 2025
Islamic	13 Rajab, AH 1447 (using tabular method)
ISO week date	2026-W01-5
Japanese	14 Shimotsuki, Reiwa 8 (Tōji, 3 days until Shōkan)
Julian	20 December, AD 2025 (AM 7535)
Julian day	2461043
Korean	14 Jwidal, 4358 DE
Maya	13.0.13.4.0; 18 Kankin, 6 Ahau
Roman	ante diem XIII Kalendas Ianuarias, MMDCCLXXIX AUC
Solar Hijri	12 Dey, SH 1404
Tibetan	14 mgo, shing mo sbrul 2152 or 1771 or 999

<<	January					>>
Su	Mo	Tu	We	Th	Fr	Sa
				1	2	3
4	5	6	7	8	9	10
11	12	13	14	15	16	17
18	19	20	21	22	23	24
25	26	27	28	29	30	31
2026

January 2 in recent years
2026 (Friday)
2025 (Thursday)
2024 (Tuesday)
2023 (Monday)
2022 (Sunday)
2021 (Saturday)
2020 (Thursday)
2019 (Wednesday)
2018 (Tuesday)
2017 (Monday)

January 2 is the second day of the year in the Gregorian calendar; 363 days remain until the end of the year (364 in leap years).

== Events ==
=== Pre-1600 ===
- 69 – The Roman legions in Germania Superior refuse to swear loyalty to Galba. They rebel and proclaim Vitellius as emperor.
- 366 – The Alemanni cross the frozen Rhine in large numbers, invading the Roman Empire.
- 533 – Mercurius becomes Pope John II, the first pope to adopt a new name upon elevation to the papacy.
- 1444 – Christian forces defeat the Turks in the battle of Kunovica.
- 1492 – Reconquista: The Emirate of Granada, the last Moorish stronghold in Spain, surrenders.

=== 1601–1900 ===
- 1680 – Trunajaya rebellion: Amangkurat II of Mataram and his bodyguards execute the rebel leader Trunajaya.
- 1776 – Empress Maria Theresa of Austria amends the Constitutio Criminalis Theresiana to include the abolition of torture throughout the Habsburg-ruled countries of Austria and Bohemia.
- 1777 – American Revolutionary War: American forces under the command of General George Washington repulse a British attack led by General Charles Cornwallis at the Battle of the Assunpink Creek near Trenton, New Jersey.
- 1788 – Georgia becomes the fourth state to ratify the United States Constitution.
- 1791 – Northwest Indian War: The Big Bottom massacre is committed by Lenape and Wyandot warriors in the Ohio Country, North America.
- 1818 – The British Institution of Civil Engineers is founded by a group of six engineers; Thomas Telford would later become its first president.
- 1863 – American Civil War: The three-day Battle of Stones River ends in a Union victory when the Confederate Army of Tennessee under General Braxton Bragg are repulsed for the final time by the Army of the Cumberland under General William S. Rosecrans.
- 1865 – Uruguayan War: The Siege of Paysandú ends as the Brazilians and Coloradans capture Paysandú, Uruguay.
- 1900 – American statesman and diplomat John Hay announces the Open Door Policy to promote trade with China.
- 1900 – Chicago Canal opens.

=== 1901–present ===
- 1920 – The second Palmer Raid, ordered by the US Department of Justice, results in 6,000 suspected communists and anarchists being arrested and held without trial.
- 1921 – World premiere of the science fiction play R.U.R. by the Czech writer Karel Čapek in a theater in Hradec Králové.
- 1932 – The Young Brothers engaged in a gun battle resulting in the deaths of six law enforcement officers; the worst single killing of US police officers in the 20th century.
- 1941 – World War II: The Cardiff Blitz severely damages the cathedral in Cardiff, Wales.
- 1942 – The Federal Bureau of Investigation (FBI) obtains the conviction of 33 members of a German spy ring headed by Fritz Joubert Duquesne in the largest espionage case in United States history; Also known as the Duquesne Spy Ring.
- 1942 – World War II: Manila is captured by Japanese forces, enabling them to control the Philippines.
- 1949 – Luis Muñoz Marín is inaugurated as the first democratically elected Governor of Puerto Rico.
- 1954 – India establishes its highest civilian awards, the Bharat Ratna and the Padma Vibhushan.
- 1955 – Following the assassination of the Panamanian president José Antonio Remón Cantera, his deputy, José Ramón Guizado, takes power, but is quickly deposed after his involvement in Cantera's death is discovered.
- 1959 – Luna 1, the first spacecraft to reach the vicinity of the Moon and to orbit the Sun, is launched by the Soviet Union.
- 1963 – Vietnam War: The Viet Cong wins its first major victory, at the Battle of Ap Bac.
- 1967 – Ronald Reagan, past movie actor and future President of the United States, is sworn in as Governor of California.
- 1971 – The second Ibrox disaster kills 66 fans at a Rangers-Celtic association football match.
- 1975 – At the opening of a new railway line, a bomb blast at Samastipur, Bihar, India, fatally wounds Lalit Narayan Mishra, Minister of Railways.
- 1976 – The Gale of January 1976 begins, resulting in coastal flooding around the southern North Sea coasts, affecting countries from Ireland to Yugoslavia and causing at least 82 deaths and US$1.3 billion in damage.
- 1978 – On the orders of the President of Pakistan, Muhammad Zia-ul-Haq, paramilitary forces opened fire on peaceful protesting workers in Multan, Pakistan; it is known as 1978 massacre at Multan Colony Textile Mills.
- 1981 – One of the largest investigations by a British police force ends when serial killer Peter Sutcliffe, the "Yorkshire Ripper", is arrested in Sheffield, South Yorkshire.
- 1988 – Condor Flugdienst Flight 3782 crashes near Seferihisar, Turkey, killing 16 people.
- 1991 – Sharon Pratt Dixon becomes the first African American woman mayor of a major city and first woman Mayor of the District of Columbia.
- 1993 – Sri Lankan Civil War: The Sri Lanka Navy kill 35–100 civilians on the Jaffna Lagoon.
- 2004 – Stardust successfully flies past Comet Wild 2, collecting samples that are returned to Earth.
- 2022 – Massive nationwide protests and unrest break out in Kazakhstan over the sudden increase of liquefied petroleum gas prices, leading to 238 people dead and thousands injured by January 11.
- 2024 – Two aircraft collide on a runway at Haneda Airport in Tokyo, killing 5 and injuring 18.

== Births ==
=== Pre-1600 ===
- 869 – Yōzei, Japanese emperor (died 949)
- 1462 – Piero di Cosimo, Italian painter (died 1522)
- 1509 – Henry of Stolberg, German nobleman (died 1572)

=== 1601–1900 ===
- 1642 – Mehmed IV, Ottoman sultan (died 1693)
- 1647 – Nathaniel Bacon, English-American rebel leader (died 1676)
- 1699 – Osman III, Ottoman sultan (died 1757)
- 1713 – Marie Dumesnil, French actress (died 1803)
- 1727 – James Wolfe, English general (died 1759)
- 1732 – František Brixi, Czech organist and composer (died 1771)
- 1777 – Christian Daniel Rauch, German sculptor and educator (died 1857)
- 1803 – Guglielmo Libri Carucci dalla Sommaja, Italian mathematician and academic (died 1869)
- 1822 – Rudolf Clausius, Polish-German physicist and mathematician (died 1888)
- 1827 – Pyotr Semyonov-Tyan-Shansky, Russian geographer and statistician (died 1914)
- 1833 – Frederick A. Johnson, American banker and politician (died 1893)
- 1836 – Mendele Mocher Sforim, Russian author (died 1917)
- 1836 – Queen Emma of Hawaii (died 1885)
- 1837 – Mily Balakirev, Russian pianist and composer (died 1910)
- 1857 – M. Carey Thomas, American educator and activist (died 1935)
- 1860 – Dugald Campbell Patterson, Canadian engineer (died 1931)
- 1860 – William Corless Mills, American historian and curator (died 1928)
- 1866 – Gilbert Murray, Australian-English playwright and scholar (died 1957)
- 1870 – Ernst Barlach, German sculptor and playwright (died 1938)
- 1870 – Tex Rickard, American boxing promoter and businessman (died 1929)
- 1873 – Antonie Pannekoek, Dutch astronomer and theorist (died 1960)
- 1873 – Thérèse of Lisieux, French nun and saint (died 1897)
- 1878 – Jaakko Mäki, Finnish politician (died 1938)
- 1878 – Mannathu Padmanabha Pillai, Indian activist, founded the Nair Service Society (died 1970)
- 1884 – Ben-Zion Dinur, Russian-Israeli historian and politician, 4th Israeli Minister of Education (died 1973)
- 1885 – Gordon Flowerdew, Canadian lieutenant, Victoria Cross recipient (died 1918)
- 1886 – Apsley Cherry-Garrard, English explorer and author (died 1959)
- 1889 – Bertram Stevens, Australian accountant and politician, 25th Premier of New South Wales (died 1973)
- 1891 – Giovanni Michelucci, Italian architect and urban planner, designed the Firenze Santa Maria Novella railway station (died 1990)
- 1892 – Seiichiro Kashio, Japanese tennis player (died 1962)
- 1895 – Folke Bernadotte, Swedish diplomat (died 1948)
- 1896 – Dziga Vertov, Polish-Russian director and screenwriter (died 1954)
- 1896 – Lawrence Wackett, Australian commander and engineer (died 1982)
- 1897 – Theodore Plucknett, English legal historian (died 1965)
- 1900 – Una Ledingham, British physician, known for research on diabetes in pregnancy (died 1965)

=== 1901–present ===
- 1901 – Bob Marshall, American activist, co-founded The Wilderness Society (died 1939)
- 1902 – Dan Keating, Irish Republican Army volunteer (died 2007)
- 1903 – Kane Tanaka, Japanese Supercentenarian, Oldest Japanese person ever, Second oldest verified person in world history (died 2022)
- 1904 – Walter Heitler, German physicist and chemist (died 1981)
- 1905 – Michael Tippett, English composer and conductor (died 1998)
- 1905 – Luigi Zampa, Italian director and screenwriter (died 1991)
- 1909 – Riccardo Cassin, Italian mountaineer and author (died 2009)
- 1909 – Barry Goldwater, American politician, businessman, and author (died 1998)
- 1913 – Juanita Jackson Mitchell, American lawyer and activist (died 1992)
- 1913 – Anna Lee, English-American actress (died 2004)
- 1914 – Jack Beaton, Australian rugby league player (died 1996)
- 1917 – Vera Zorina, German-Norwegian actress and dancer (died 2003)
- 1918 – Willi Graf, German physician and activist (died 1943)
- 1919 – Ernest Bender, American Indologist (died 1996)
- 1919 – Beatrice Hicks, American engineer (died 1979)
- 1920 (probable) – Isaac Asimov, American writer and professor of biochemistry (died 1992)
- 1920 – Bob Feerick, American basketball player and coach (died 1976)
- 1921 – Glen Harmon, Canadian ice hockey player (died 2007)
- 1926 – Gino Marchetti, American football player (died 2019)
- 1928 – Dan Rostenkowski, American politician (died 2010)
- 1929 – Charles Beaumont, screenwriter and American author of speculative fiction (died 1967)
- 1929 – Tellervo Koivisto, Finnish politician, former First Lady of Finland
- 1931 – Toshiki Kaifu, Japanese lawyer and politician, Prime Minister of Japan (died 2022)
- 1933 – Richard Riley, American politician, 6th United States Secretary of Education
- 1934 – John Hollowbread, English footballer, goalkeeper (died 2007)
- 1936 – Roger Miller, American singer-songwriter, musician, and actor (died 1992)
- 1938 – David Bailey, English photographer and painter
- 1938 – Lynn Conway, American computer scientist and electrical engineer (died 2024)
- 1938 – Robert Smithson, American sculptor and photographer (died 1973)
- 1940 – Jim Bakker, American televangelist (died 2026)
- 1940 – Saud bin Faisal bin Abdulaziz Al Saud, Saudi Arabian economist and politician, Saudi Arabian Minister of Foreign Affairs (died 2015)
- 1942 – Thomas Hammarberg, Swedish lawyer and diplomat
- 1942 – Dennis Hastert, American educator and politician, 59th Speaker of the United States House of Representatives (died 2026)
- 1943 – Janet Akyüz Mattei, Turkish-American astronomer (died 2004)
- 1944 – Charlie Davis, Trinidadian cricketer
- 1944 – Péter Eötvös, Hungarian composer and conductor (died 2024)
- 1944 – Norodom Ranariddh, Cambodian field marshal and politician, 1st Prime Minister of Cambodia (died 2021)
- 1944 – Mohamed Ali Yusuf, Somali politician (died 2024)
- 1947 – Jack Hanna, American zoologist and author
- 1947 – Calvin Hill, American football player
- 1947 – David Shapiro, American poet, historian, and critic (died 2024)
- 1948 – Judith Miller, American journalist
- 1948 – Deborah Watling, English actress (died 2017)
- 1949 – Christopher Durang, American playwright and screenwriter (died 2024)
- 1949 – Iris Marion Young, American political scientist and academic (died 2006)
- 1952 – Indulis Emsis, Latvian biologist and politician, 9th Prime Minister of Latvia
- 1952 – Wendy Phillips, American actress
- 1954 – Henry Bonilla, American broadcaster and politician
- 1954 – Évelyne Trouillot, Haitian playwright and author
- 1961 – Gabrielle Carteris, American actress
- 1961 – Paula Hamilton, English model
- 1961 – Todd Haynes, American film director, screenwriter, and producer
- 1961 – Craig James, American football player and sportscaster
- 1961 – Robert Wexler, American lawyer and politician
- 1963 – David Cone, American baseball player and sportscaster
- 1963 – Edgar Martínez, American baseball player
- 1964 – Chris Welp, German-American basketball player (died 2015)
- 1964 – Pernell Whitaker, American boxer (died 2019)
- 1967 – Francois Pienaar, South African rugby player
- 1967 – Tia Carrere, American actress
- 1967 – Jón Gnarr, Icelandic actor and politician; 20th Mayor of Reykjavík
- 1968 – Cuba Gooding, Jr., American actor and producer
- 1968 – Anky van Grunsven, Dutch dressage champion
- 1969 – István Bagyula, Hungarian pole vaulter
- 1969 – William Fox-Pitt, English horse rider and journalist
- 1969 – Elena Gorolová, Czech Romani activist
- 1969 – Tommy Morrison, American boxer and actor (died 2013)
- 1969 – Róbert Švehla, Slovak ice hockey player
- 1969 – Christy Turlington, American model
- 1970 – Eric Whitacre, American composer and conductor
- 1971 – Taye Diggs, American actor and singer
- 1971 – Renée Elise Goldsberry, American actress
- 1972 – Rodney MacDonald, Canadian educator and politician, 26th Premier of Nova Scotia
- 1972 – Shiraz Minwalla, Indian theoretical physicist and string theorist
- 1972 – Mattias Norström, Swedish ice hockey player and manager
- 1974 – Ludmila Formanová, Czech runner
- 1974 – Juha Lind, Finnish ice hockey player
- 1974 – Tomáš Řepka, Czech footballer
- 1975 – Chris Cheney, Australian singer-songwriter, guitarist, and producer
- 1975 – Dax Shepard, American actor
- 1975 – Jeff Suppan, American baseball player
- 1975 – Reuben Thorne, New Zealand rugby player
- 1976 – Paz Vega, Spanish actress
- 1977 – Brian Boucher, American ice hockey player and sportscaster
- 1977 – Stefan Koubek, Austrian tennis player
- 1979 – Jonathan Greening, English footballer
- 1980 – Kemi Badenoch, English politician
- 1980 – David Gyasi, British actor
- 1981 – Kirk Hinrich, American basketball player
- 1981 – Maxi Rodríguez, Argentine footballer
- 1983 – Kate Bosworth, American actress
- 1983 – Anthony Carrigan, American actor
- 1987 – Shelley Hennig, American actress and model
- 1987 – Robert Milsom, English footballer
- 1987 – Loïc Rémy, French footballer
- 1988 – Germán Cano, Argentine footballer
- 1988 – Luke Harangody, American basketball player
- 1988 – Damien Tussac, French-German rugby player
- 1991 – Ben Hardy, English actor
- 1992 – Paulo Gazzaniga, Argentine footballer
- 1992 – Alexey Marchenko, Russian ice hockey player
- 1992 – Teemu Pulkkinen, Finnish ice hockey player
- 1992 – Korbin Sims, Australian-Fijian rugby league player
- 1993 – Bryson Tiller, American singer and rapper
- 1994 – Ronald Darby, American football player
- 1996 – Jonah Bolden, Australian-American basketball player
- 1997 – Arshad Nadeem, Pakistani javelin thrower
- 1997 – Carlos Soler, Spanish footballer
- 1998 – Tfue, American online streamer
- 1998 – Timothy Fosu-Mensah, Dutch footballer
- 1999 – Georgios Kalaitzakis, Greek basketball player
- 1999 – Fernando Tatís Jr., Dominican baseball player
- 1999 – Aaron Wiggins, American professional basketball player
- 2000 – Spencer Arrighetti, American baseball player
- 2001 – Cole Caufield, American ice hockey player
- 2001 – Luiz Henrique, Brazilian footballer
- 2003 – CJ Egan-Riley, English footballer
- 2003 – Elye Wahi, French footballer
- 2006 – Claudio Echeverri, Argentine footballer

== Deaths ==
=== Pre-1600 ===
- 951 – Liu Chengyou, Emperor Yin of the Later Han (born 931)
- 951 – Su Fengji, Chinese official and chancellor
- 1096 – William de St-Calais, Bishop of Durham and chief counsellor of William II of England
- 1169 – Bertrand de Blanchefort, sixth Grand Master of the Knights Templar (born c. 1109)
- 1184 – Theodora Komnene, Duchess of Austria, daughter of Andronikos Komnenos
- 1298 – Lodomer, Hungarian prelate, Archbishop of Esztergom
- 1470 – Heinrich Reuß von Plauen, Grand Master of the Teutonic Order
- 1512 – Svante Nilsson, Swedish politician (born 1460)
- 1514 – William Smyth, English bishop and academic (born 1460)
- 1543 – Francesco Canova da Milano, Italian composer (born 1497)
- 1557 – Pontormo, Italian painter and educator (born 1494)
- 1598 – Morris Kyffin, Welsh soldier and writer (born c.1555)

=== 1601–1900 ===
- 1613 – Salima Sultan Begum, Empress of the Mughal Empire (born 1539)
- 1614 – Luisa Carvajal y Mendoza, Spanish mystical poet and Catholic martyr (born 1566)
- 1726 – Domenico Zipoli, Italian organist and composer (born 1688)
- 1763 – John Carteret, 2nd Earl Granville, English statesman (born 1690)
- 1816 – Louis-Bernard Guyton de Morveau, French chemist and politician (born 1793)
- 1850 – Manuel de la Peña y Peña, Mexican lawyer and 20th President (1847) (born 1789)
- 1861 – Frederick William IV of Prussia (born 1795)
- 1876 – Meta Heusser-Schweizer, Swiss poet (born 1797)
- 1892 – George Biddell Airy, English mathematician and astronomer (born 1801)

=== 1901–present ===
- 1904 – James Longstreet, American general and diplomat (born 1821)
- 1913 – Léon Teisserenc de Bort, French meteorologist (born 1855)
- 1915 – Karl Goldmark, Hungarian violinist and composer (born 1830)
- 1917 – Léon Flameng, French cyclist (born 1877)
- 1920 – Paul Adam, French author (born 1862)
- 1924 – Sabine Baring-Gould, English author and scholar (born 1834)
- 1939 – Roman Dmowski, Polish politician, Polish Minister of Foreign Affairs (born 1864)
- 1941 – Mischa Levitzki, Russian-American pianist and composer (born 1898)
- 1946 – Joe Darling, Australian cricketer and politician (born 1870)
- 1950 – James Dooley, Irish-Australian politician, 21st Premier of New South Wales (born 1877)
- 1951 – William Campion, English colonel and politician, 21st Governor of Western Australia (born 1870)
- 1951 – Edith New, English militant suffragette (born 1877)
- 1953 – Guccio Gucci, Italian businessman and fashion designer, founder of Gucci (born 1881)
- 1960 – Paul Sauvé, Canadian lawyer and politician, 17th Premier of Quebec (born 1907)
- 1963 – Dick Powell, American actor, singer, and director (born 1904)
- 1963 – Jack Carson, Canadian-American actor (born 1910)
- 1974 – Tex Ritter, American actor (born 1905)
- 1975 – Siraj Sikder, Bangladesh revolutionary leader (born 1944)
- 1977 – Erroll Garner, American pianist and composer (born 1921)
- 1986 – Una Merkel, American actress (born 1903)
- 1987 – Harekrushna Mahatab, Indian journalist and politician, 1st Chief Minister of Odisha (born 1899)
- 1989 – Safdar Hashmi, Indian actor, director, and playwright (born 1954)
- 1990 – Alan Hale Jr., American film and television actor (born 1921)
- 1990 – Evangelos Averoff, Greek historian and politician, Greek Minister for National Defence (born 1910)
- 1994 – Dixy Lee Ray, American biologist and politician; 17th Governor of Washington (born 1914)
- 1994 – Pierre-Paul Schweitzer, French lawyer and businessman (born 1915)
- 1995 – Nancy Kelly, American actress (born 1921)
- 1995 – Siad Barre, Somali general and politician; 3rd President of Somalia (born 1919)
- 1999 – Rolf Liebermann, Swiss-French composer and manager (born 1910)
- 1999 – Sebastian Haffner, German journalist and author (born 1907)
- 2000 – Elmo Zumwalt, American admiral (born 1920)
- 2000 – Patrick O'Brian, English author and translator (born 1914)
- 2001 – William P. Rogers, American lieutenant, lawyer, and politician, 55th United States Secretary of State (born 1913)
- 2005 – Maclyn McCarty, American geneticist and physician (born 1911)
- 2006 – Cecilia Muñoz-Palma, Filipino lawyer and jurist (born 1913)
- 2006 – Osa Massen, Danish-American actress (born 1914)
- 2007 – A. Richard Newton, Australian-American engineer and academic (born 1951)
- 2007 – Elizabeth Fox-Genovese, American historian and author (born 1941)
- 2007 – Teddy Kollek, Hungarian-Israeli politician, Mayor of Jerusalem (born 1911)
- 2008 – George MacDonald Fraser, Scottish journalist and author (born 1925)
- 2008 – Lee S. Dreyfus, American politician, Governor of Wisconsin (born 1926)
- 2009 – Inger Christensen, Danish poet and author (born 1935)
- 2010 – David R. Ross, Scottish historian and author (born 1958)
- 2011 – Anne Francis, American actress (born 1930)
- 2011 – Bali Ram Bhagat, Indian politician; 16th Governor of Rajasthan (born 1922)
- 2011 – Mia Bustam, Indonesian painter, writer, and political prisoner (born 1920)
- 2011 – Pete Postlethwaite, English actor (born 1946)
- 2012 – William P. Carey, American businessman and philanthropist, founded W. P. Carey (born 1930)
- 2012 – Silvana Gallardo, American actress and producer (born 1953)
- 2012 – Gordon Hirabayashi, American-Canadian sociologist and academic (born 1918)
- 2013 – Gerda Lerner, Austrian-American historian, author, and academic (born 1920)
- 2013 – Teresa Torańska, Polish journalist and author (born 1944)
- 2014 – Bernard Glasser, American director and producer (born 1924)
- 2014 – Elizabeth Jane Howard, English author and screenwriter (born 1923)
- 2015 – Tihomir Novakov, Serbian-American physicist and academic (born 1929)
- 2016 – Ardhendu Bhushan Bardhan, Indian lawyer and politician (born 1924)
- 2016 – Frances Cress Welsing, American psychiatrist and author (born 1935)
- 2016 – Nimr al-Nimr, Saudi Arabian religious leader (born 1959)
- 2016 – Gisela Mota Ocampo, mayor of Temixco, Morelos, Mexico, assassinated (born 1982)
- 2017 – Jean Vuarnet, French ski racer (born 1933)
- 2017 – John Berger, English art critic, novelist and painter (born 1926)
- 2018 – Guida Maria, Portuguese actress (born 1950)
- 2018 – Thomas S. Monson, American religious leader, 16th president of the Church of Jesus Christ of Latter-day Saints (born 1927)
- 2019 – Daryl Dragon, American musician (born 1942)
- 2019 – Bob Einstein, American actor and comedian (born 1942)
- 2019 – Julia Grant, British transgender activist (born 1954)
- 2019 – Gene Okerlund, American wrestling announcer (born 1942)
- 2025 – Ágnes Keleti, Hungarian Olympic gymnast (born 1921)
- 2025 – Francesc Antich, Spanish politician (born 1958)

== Holidays and observances ==
- Ancestry Day (Haiti)
- Berchtold's Day (Switzerland)
- Christian feast day:
  - Basil the Great (Catholic Church and Church of England)
  - Gregory of Nazianzus (Catholic Church)
  - John the Good
  - Macarius of Alexandria
  - Blessed Marie Anne Blondin
  - Seraphim of Sarov (Eastern Orthodox Church)
  - Theodore of Marseille
  - Vedanayagam Samuel Azariah (Episcopal Church)
  - January 2 (Eastern Orthodox liturgics)
- The Day after New Year's Day (New Zealand)
- Kaapse Klopse (Cape Town, South Africa)
- The first day of Blacks and Whites' Carnival, celebrated until January 7 (Colombia)
- The ninth of the Twelve Days of Christmas (Western Christianity)
- Bank holiday (Scotland)
