= January 3 (Eastern Orthodox liturgics) =

Day in the Eastern Orthodox liturgical calendar

Eastern Orthodox liturgical calendar
January 2	January 3	January 4
January 3 O.S. ≍ January 16 N.S. January 3 N.S ≍ December 21 O.S.

An Eastern Orthodox cross

January 3 in Eastern Orthodox liturgical calendars is a feast day and a day of commemoration of saints and martyrs. Although some Orthodox churches use the Revised Julian Calendar and others use the traditional Julian calendar, the fixed commemorations for their respective January 3 are broadly the same, no matter which calendar is used. (Note: Despite the dates being the same, the days to which they refer typically differ by 13 days. The notation Old Style or O.S. is sometimes used to indicate a date in the traditional Julian Calendar (the "Old Calendar"). The notation New Style or N.S, indicates a date in the Revised Julian calendar (the "New Calendar").)

== Feasts ==
- Forefeast of the Theophany of Our Lord and Savior Jesus Christ (Note: The second day of the Forefeast of Theophany falls on January 3. Today's hymns invite us to go in spirit to the Jordan River where the Creator comes to be baptized. He is the Light which shines in the darkness (John 1:5), and today He begins to overcome that darkness.)

== Saints ==
- Holy Prophet Malachi (c. 400 BC)
- Martyr Peter, in Avlona (Aulane) of Samaria, Palestine (311)
- Martyr Gordius, at Caesarea in Cappadocia, centurion, by the sword (c. 314) (Note: "At Caesarea, in Cappadocia, St. Gordius, centurion, in whose praise is extant a celebrated discourse, delivered by St. Basil the Great on the day of his festival.")
- Hieromartyr Titus, Bishop of Tomis (323)
- Venerable Meliton of Beirut (537)
- Venerable Peter of Atroa (Peter the Standard-Bearer) (837) (see also: September 13, January 1 - Western Rite)
- Venerable Acacius the Wonderworker, of Mount Latros (Latmos), at the Megisti Lavra of the Theotokos of Myrsinon (c. 10th century) (Note: The many monks which had settled at Mt. Latros (Latmos) before the period of Emperor Leo VI the Wise (886-912 AD), eventually gave Mt. Latros (Latmos) the appellative "the Ephesian Mount Athos" ((in Greek): «τὸ κατ’ Ἔφεσον Ἅγιον Ὄρος»); this took place during the reign of Emperor Constantine Porphyrogenitus (913-959 AD).)
- 3 Martyrs, a mother and her two children slain by fire
- Saint Thomais of Lesbos (10th century)

== Pre-Schism Western saints ==
- Hieromartyr Daniel of Padua, a Deacon who helped Saint Prosdocimus, the first Bishop of Padua in Italy (168)
- Saint Anterus, Pope of Rome (236) (Note: A Greek who was Pope of Rome for only a few weeks. He may have been martyred and was buried in the Catacomb of St. Callistus, the first Pope to be so.) (see also: August 5 - Eastern Calendar)
- Hieromartyr Florentius of Vienne, a martyred Bishop of Vienne in France (3rd century) (Note: "At Vienne, in France, St. Florentius, bishop, who was sent into exile and consummated his martyrdom, in the time of the emperor Gallienus.")
- Venerable Genevieve of Paris (502) (Note: Born in Nanterre near Paris in France, aged seven she became known to St. Germanus of Auxerre. Aged fifteen, she became a nun. When Paris was occupied by the pagan Franks and afterwards threatened by Attila and the Huns, St. Geneviève encouraged the people to defend the city. She has always been considered the special protectress and patroness of Paris, which she protected again in 1914.)
- Saint Fintan of Doon, a disciple of Saint Comgall at Bangor in Ireland; he is honoured as the patron-saint of Doon in Limerick where his holy well still exists (6th century)
- Saint Finlugh of Derry (Finlag), a brother of Saint Fintan of Doon, he went to Scotland where he became one of Saint Columba's disciples; returning to Ireland, he became abbot of a monastery in County Londonderry (6th century)
- Saint Blitmund, a monk at Bobbio Abbey in Italy (c. 660) (Note: He followed St. Walaricus (St. Valéry) to France, where they founded the monastery of Leucone, later called Saint-Valéry. St. Blitmund was the second abbot.)
- Saint Bertilia of Mareuil, anchoress (c. 687) (Note: A noble virgin who took a vow of continence with her husband; on his death she lived as an anchoress near a church she had founded at Maroeuil (Marolles) in Flanders in Belgium.)
- Saint Findlugan of Islay (Finlaggan, Fionn Lugain) (7th century) (Note: "Eilean Mor (Finlaggan) appears in surviving documents as the Isle of St. Finlagan (alternative spellings of the name being Findlugan or Fionn Lugain). A charter of 1427, for example, was witnessed as being granted "apud insula sancti Finlagani in Yle" (on the island of St. Finlagan in Islay). Findlugan was a contemporary of St Columba (who was born in 521). St. Columba established an Abbey in Tamlaght near Lough Foyle in 585 and installed Findlugan as its first Abbot. The monk made Scotland his missionary Field. Early monastic accounts tell how Findlugan saved the life of Columba when he interposed his body between the saint and a would-be assassin. This happened at Hinba, believed by some to have been Eileach an Naoimh, one of the Garvellochs, rocky islets north of Jura, or to have been Jura itself. It is possible Findlugan established an early monastic community on the island bearing his name. The Chapel built much later was certainly dedicated to him. Over the years the spelling changed -the loch became known as Finlaggan and the island as Eilean Mor.")
- Saint Wenog, an early saint in Wales (Note: "In parts of Wales, the festival of ST. WENOG, whose name is found in an ancient calendar, but whose acts are unknown.")

== Post-Schism Orthodox saints ==
- Righteous Ekvtime (Euthymius) Takaishvili the Man of God of Tbilisi (1953) (Note: The Holy Synod of the Georgian Apostolic Orthodox Church canonized St. Ekvtime on October 17, 2002, and joyously proclaimed him a "Man of God.")

=== New martyrs and confessors ===
- New Hieromartyr Basil Kholmogorov, Archpriest, of Ostrov, Moscow (1938)

== Other commemorations ==
- Repose of Schemahierodeacon Elder Panteleimon, founder of Kostychev Convent (1884)
- Discovery of the Relics (1950) of the Holy Great Martyr Ephraim, Monk of Nea Makri (1426) (see also: December 21 - O.S.; and May 5 - feast day)

== Icon gallery ==
Holy Prophet Malachi.
(Menologion of Basil II, 10th century).

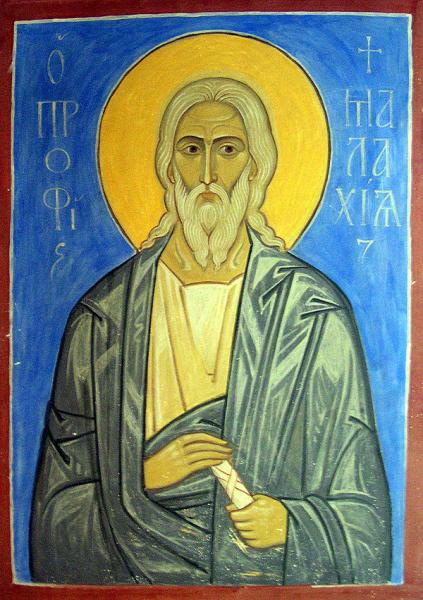
Holy Prophet Malachi.

Martyr Gordius, at Caesarea in Cappadocia, centurion, by the sword.
(Menologion of Basil II, 10th century).

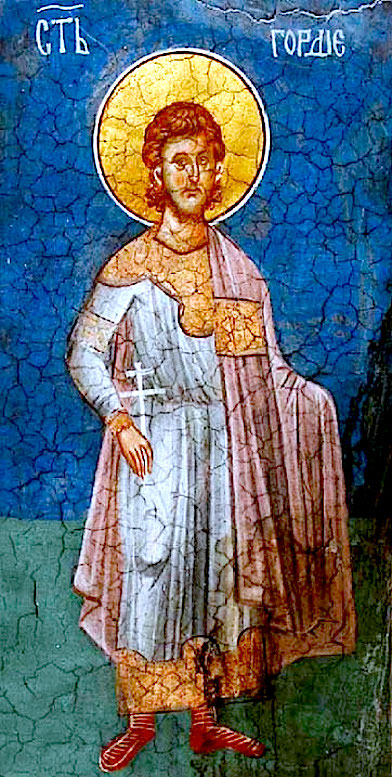
Martyr Gordius.

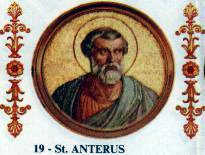
Saint Anterus, Pope of Rome.

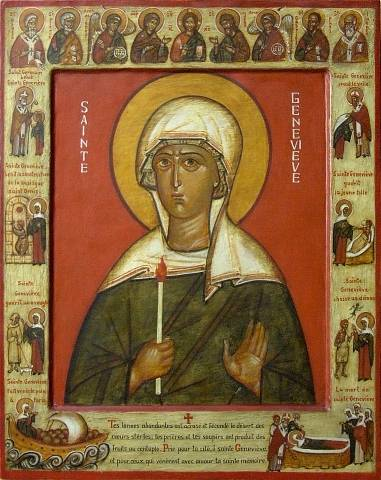
Venerable Genevieve of Paris.

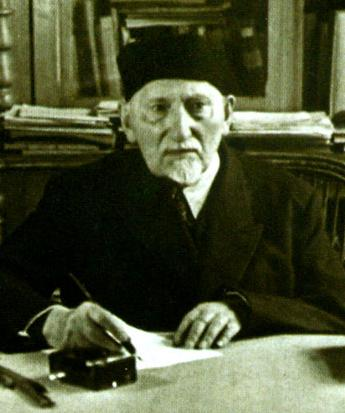
Righteous Ekvtime Takaishvili the Man of God, of Tbilisi.

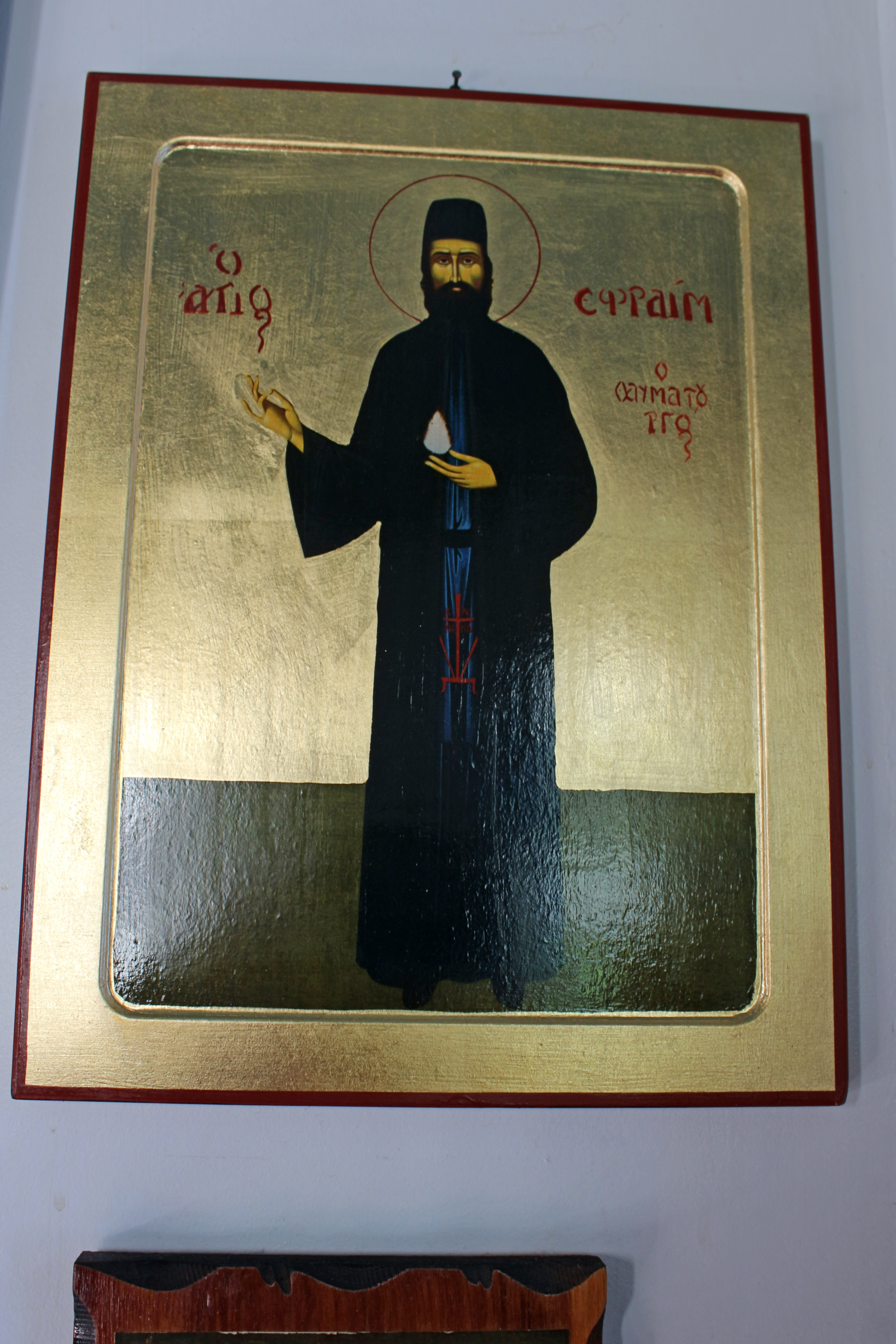
New Monk-Martyr Ephraim of Nea Makri.

== Sources ==
- January 3/January 16. Orthodox Calendar (PRAVOSLAVIE.RU).
- January 16 / January 3. HOLY TRINITY RUSSIAN ORTHODOX CHURCH (A parish of the Patriarchate of Moscow).
- January 3. OCA - The Lives of the Saints.
- The Autonomous Orthodox Metropolia of Western Europe and the Americas (ROCOR). St. Hilarion Calendar of Saints for the year of our Lord 2004. St. Hilarion Press (Austin, TX). pp. 4–5.
- January 3. Latin Saints of the Orthodox Patriarchate of Rome.
- The Roman Martyrology. Transl. by the Archbishop of Baltimore. Last Edition, According to the Copy Printed at Rome in 1914. Revised Edition, with the Imprimatur of His Eminence Cardinal Gibbons. Baltimore: John Murphy Company, 1916. pp. 4–5.

Greek Sources

- Great Synaxaristes: (in Greek) 3 ΙΑΝΟΥΑΡΙΟΥ. ΜΕΓΑΣ ΣΥΝΑΞΑΡΙΣΤΗΣ.
- (in Greek) Συναξαριστής. 3 Ιανουαρίου. ECCLESIA.GR. (H ΕΚΚΛΗΣΙΑ ΤΗΣ ΕΛΛΑΔΟΣ).

Russian Sources

- (in Russian) 16 января (3 января). Православная Энциклопедия под редакцией Патриарха Московского и всея Руси Кирилла (электронная версия). (Orthodox Encyclopedia - Pravenc.ru).
- (in Russian) 3 января (ст.ст.) 16 января 2013 (нов. ст.). Русская Православная Церковь Отдел внешних церковных связей. (DECR).
