= January 1 (Eastern Orthodox liturgics) =

Day in the Eastern Orthodox liturgical calendar

Eastern Orthodox liturgical calendar
| December 31 | January 1 | January 2 |
January 1 O.S. ≍ January 14 N.S. January 1 N.S ≍ December 19 O.S.

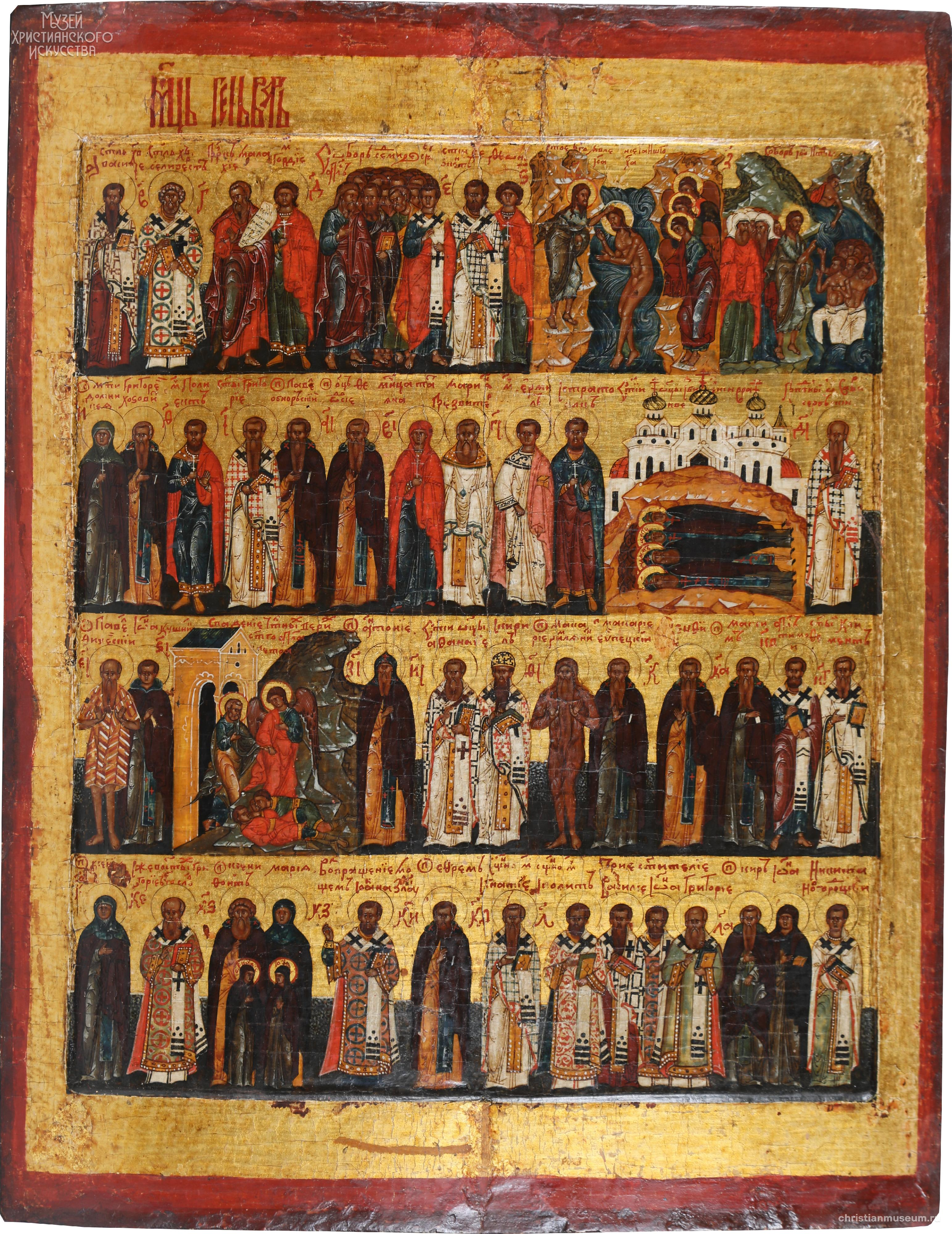
Menaion calendar icon - January.

January 1 in Eastern Orthodox liturgical calendars is a feast day and a day of commemoration of saints and martyrs. Although some Orthodox churches use the Revised Julian Calendar and others use the traditional Julian calendar, the fixed commemorations for their respective January 1 are broadly the same, no matter which calendar is used. (Note: Despite the dates being the same, the days to which they refer typically differ by 13 days. The notation Old Style or O.S. is sometimes used to indicate a date in the traditional Julian Calendar (the "Old Calendar"). The notation New Style or N.S, indicates a date in the Revised Julian calendar (the "New Calendar").)

== Feasts ==
Icon of the Circumcision of Christ, with Saint Basil the Great below.

- Feast of the Circumcision of Christ (Note: "The CIRCUMCISION of Our Lord and Saviour JESUS CHRIST, by virtue of Whose Adorable Blood-shedding, a glorious host of Saints, Martyrs, Confessors, Virgins – men and women of every degree – as well in this land as throughout Christendom, kept the Faith, persevered unto death in their holy course, and in the end received the crown, at the hands of the Just Judge.") (Note: "THE Circumcision of our Lord Jesus Christ, and the Octave of His Nativity.")

== Saints ==
- Martyr Theodotus, by the sword
- Martyr Basil of Ancyra (362) (Note: This saint, a layman, should not be confused with the other Saint Basil of Ancyra, who was a priest (March 22).) (see also: January 2)
- Saint Gregory the Elder, Bishop of Nazianzus and father of Saint Gregory the Theologian (374)
- Saint Emilia, mother of Saints Macrina the Younger, Basil the Great, Naucratius, Gregory of Nyssa, Peter of Sebaste, and Theosebia (disputed) (375) (Note: Churches of the Russian tradition keep her feast on January 1, along with her son Basil. Greek churches keep her feast on May 8 or May 30, along with her husband Saint Basil the Elder and her mother-in-law, Saint Macrina the Elder.)
- Saint Basil the Great, Archbishop of Caesarea in Cappadocia (379) (Note: In Greek tradition, his name was given to Father Christmas and he is supposed to visit children and give presents every January 1 (St. Basil's Day) — unlike other traditions where Saint Nicholas arrives either on December 6 (Saint Nicholas Day) or on Christmas Eve (December 24). It is traditional on St. Basil's Day to serve "Vasilopita", a rich bread baked with a coin inside. It is customary on his feast day to visit the homes of friends and relatives, to sing New Year carols, and to set an extra place at the table for Saint Basil. In Greek tradition and according to historical records, St. Basil, of Greek heritage, is the original "Father Christmas", who being born into a wealthy family, gave away all his possessions to the poor and those in need, the underprivileged and children. A similar story exists for another Greek bishop, St. Nicholas of Myra. Over the centuries the two have been merged but the Western "Santa Claus" is St. Nicholas and the Eastern "Santa Claus" is St. Basil.) (Note: Name days celebrated today include: Vasilios, Basil, Bill (Βασίλειος); Vasiliki, Vicky, Vaso (Βασιλική).)
- Saint Theodosius of Tryglia, Abbot (Note: The Venerable Theodosius was Abbot at one of the four famed monasteries of Triglia. (in Greek) Ὁ Ὅσιος Θεοδόσιος ἦταν ἡγούμενος σὲ μία ἀπὸ τὶς τέσσερις φημισμένες Μονὲς τῆς Τριγλίας, τοῦ Μιδηκίου, τοῦ Βαθέως Ρύακος, τοῦ Ἁγίου Στεφάνου καὶ τοῦ Ἁγίου Ἰωάννου. Κοιμήθηκε Ὁσίως μὲ εἰρήνη.)

== Pre-Schism Western saints ==
- Hieromartyr Concordius of Spoleto (c. 175) (Note: "At Spoleto, in the time of the emperor Antoninus, St. Concordius, priest and martyr, who was beaten with clubs, and then put to the torture. After a long confinement in prison, where he was visited by an angel, he lost his life by the sword.")
- Thirty soldier-martyrs in Rome, under Diocletian (c. 304) (Note: "In the same city, on the Appian way, the crowning with martyrdom of thirty holy soldiers, under the emperor Diocletian.")
- Monastic Martyr Telemachus (Telemakhos, Almachius), hermit who came to Rome from the East and publicly protested against Pagan rites on New Year's Day, killed by gladiators in the Roman amphitheatre (391 or 404) (Note: "At Rome, St. Almachius, martyr, who, by the command of Alipius, governor of the city, was killed by the gladiators for saying, "Today is the Octave of our Lord's birth; put an end to the worship of idols, and abstain from unclean sacrifices.") (Note: Name days celebrated today include: Telemachus, Telemachos (Τηλέμαχος).)
- Saint Basil, Bishop of Aix en Provence (c. 475)
- Saint Eugendus, fourth Abbot of Condat Abbey in the Jura Mountains (510)
- Saint Fanchea of Killeany (Fanchea of Rossory), sister of Saint Enda of Aran (c. 520) (Note: She founded a convent at Rossory in Fermanagh and was buried in Killane.)
- Saint Fulgentius, Bishop of Ruspe in North Africa (533) (Note: "In Africa, St. Fulgentius, bishop of Ruspoe, who suffered much from the Arians during the persecution of the Vandals, for holding the Catholic faith and teaching its excellent doctrine. After being banished to Sardinia, he was permitted to return to his diocese, where he ended his life by a holy death, leaving a reputation for sanctity and eloquence.")
- Saint Justin, Bishop of Chieti, Italy (c. 540) (Note: "At Chieti, in Abruzzo, the birthday of St. Justin, bishop of that city, illustrious for holiness of life and miracles." In the language of the Church, birthday refers to the day on which a Saint enters heaven. However, the Blessed Virgin and St. John the Baptist are exceptions to this rule.)
- Saint Felix, Bishop of Bourges (c. 580)
- Saint Connat (Comnata, Comnatan), Abbess of Kildare Abbey in Ireland (c. 590)
- Saint Maelrhys, a saint on Bardsey Island in Wales (6th century)
- Saint Clarus, Abbot of St. Marcellus Monastery in Vienne, Gaul (c. 660)
- Saint Cúan (Mochua, Moncan), Irish abbot, founder of many churches and monasteries in Ireland, lived to nearly 100 (752)
- Saint Peter of Atroa, Abbot, opponent of iconoclasm (Peter the Standard-Bearer) (837) (see also: January 3 - East)
- Saint William of Dijon (William of Volpiano, Guillaume de Volpiano), Italian monastic reformer and architect (1031)

== Post-Schism Orthodox saints ==
- Saint Athanasius Volkhovsky, Bishop of Mogilev and Polotsk, Wonderworker of Poltava (1801)

=== New martyrs and confessors ===
- New Martyr Peter of Tripolis in the Peloponnesus, at Temisi in Asia Minor (1776)
- New Monastic Martyr Jeremiah Leonov of Valaam (1918)
- New Hieromartyrs Platon Kulbusch (Kulbush), Bishop of Revel (Tallinn), Estonia, and Michael Blaive (Note: See: (in Russian) Блейве, Михаил Иванович. Википедии. (Russian Wikipedia).) and Nicholas Bezhanitsky, (Note: See: (in Russian) Бежаницкий, Николай Стефанович. Википедии. (Russian Wikipedia).) Archpriests (1919) (see also January 14)
- New Hieromartyrs Alexander Trapitsyn, Archbishop of Samara;
  - with him, priests: John Smirnov, Alexander Ivanov, Alexander Organov, John Suldin, Trophimus Miachin, Viacheslav Infantov, Basil Vitevsky, and Jacob Alferov (1938)

== Other commemorations ==
- Icon of the Mother of God "You are a Vineyard" (Georgian: Shen khar venakhi) (see also May 23)

== Icon gallery ==
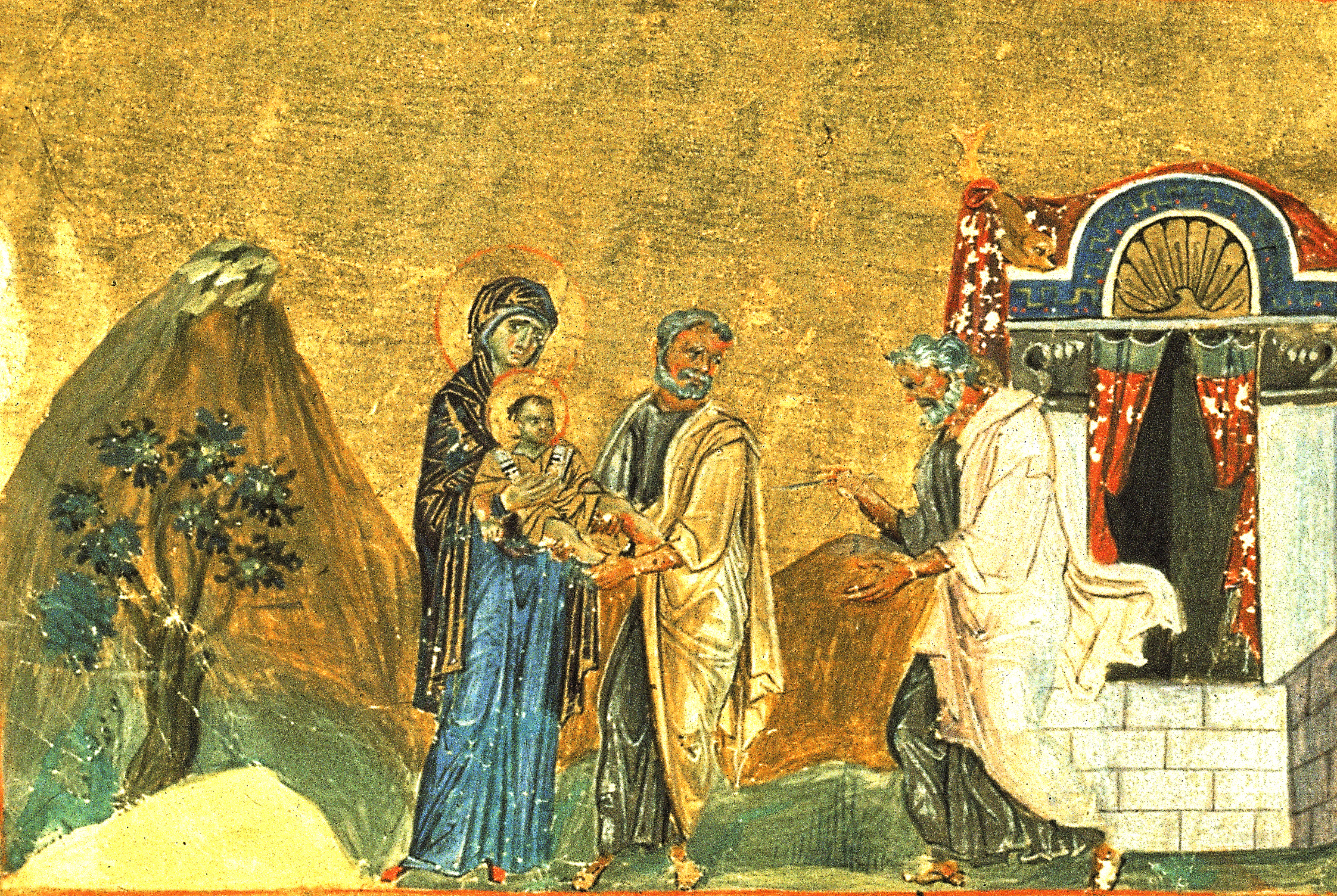
Circumcision of Christ.
(Menologion of Basil II, 10th century).

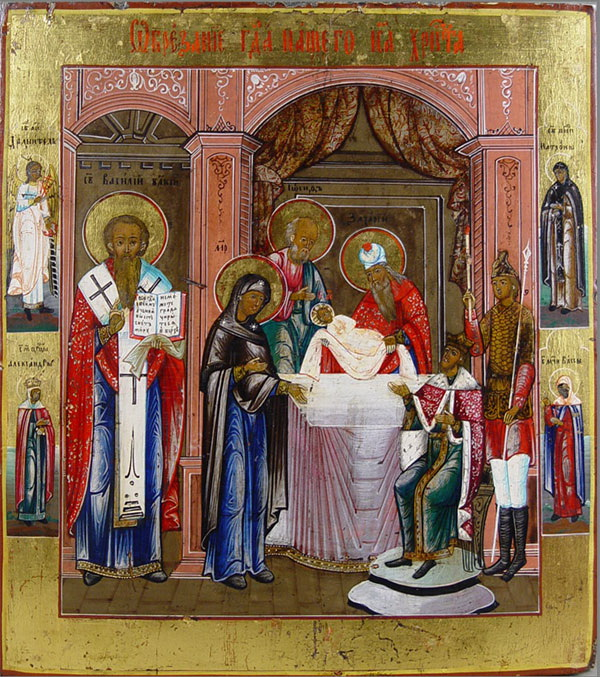
Circumcision of Christ
(19th century).

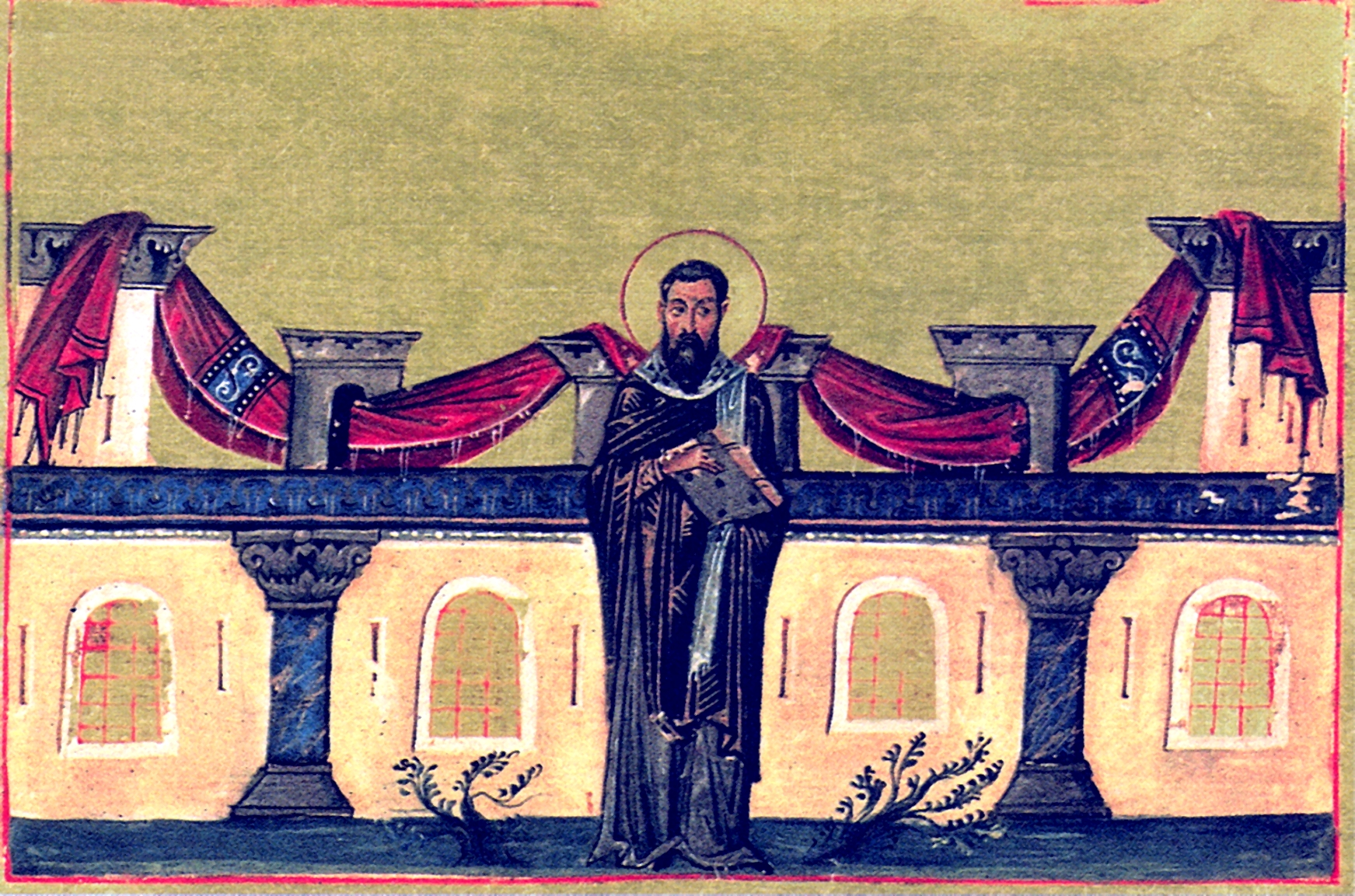
St. Basil the Great.
(Menologion of Basil II, 10th century).

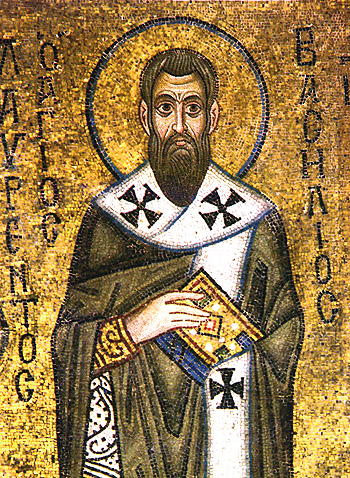
St. Basil the Great.

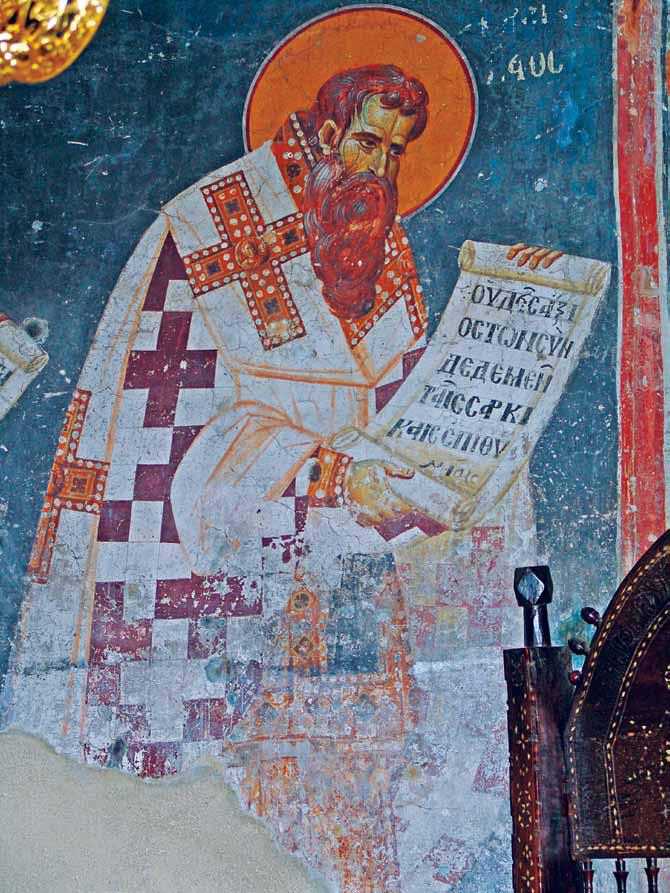
Fresco of St. Basil the Great.
(Church of St. Mary Peribleptos in Ohrid, 13th century).

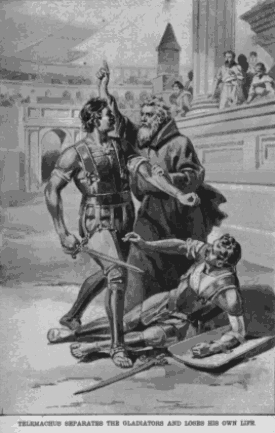
St. Telemachus.
(Foxe's Book of Martyrs, 1563).

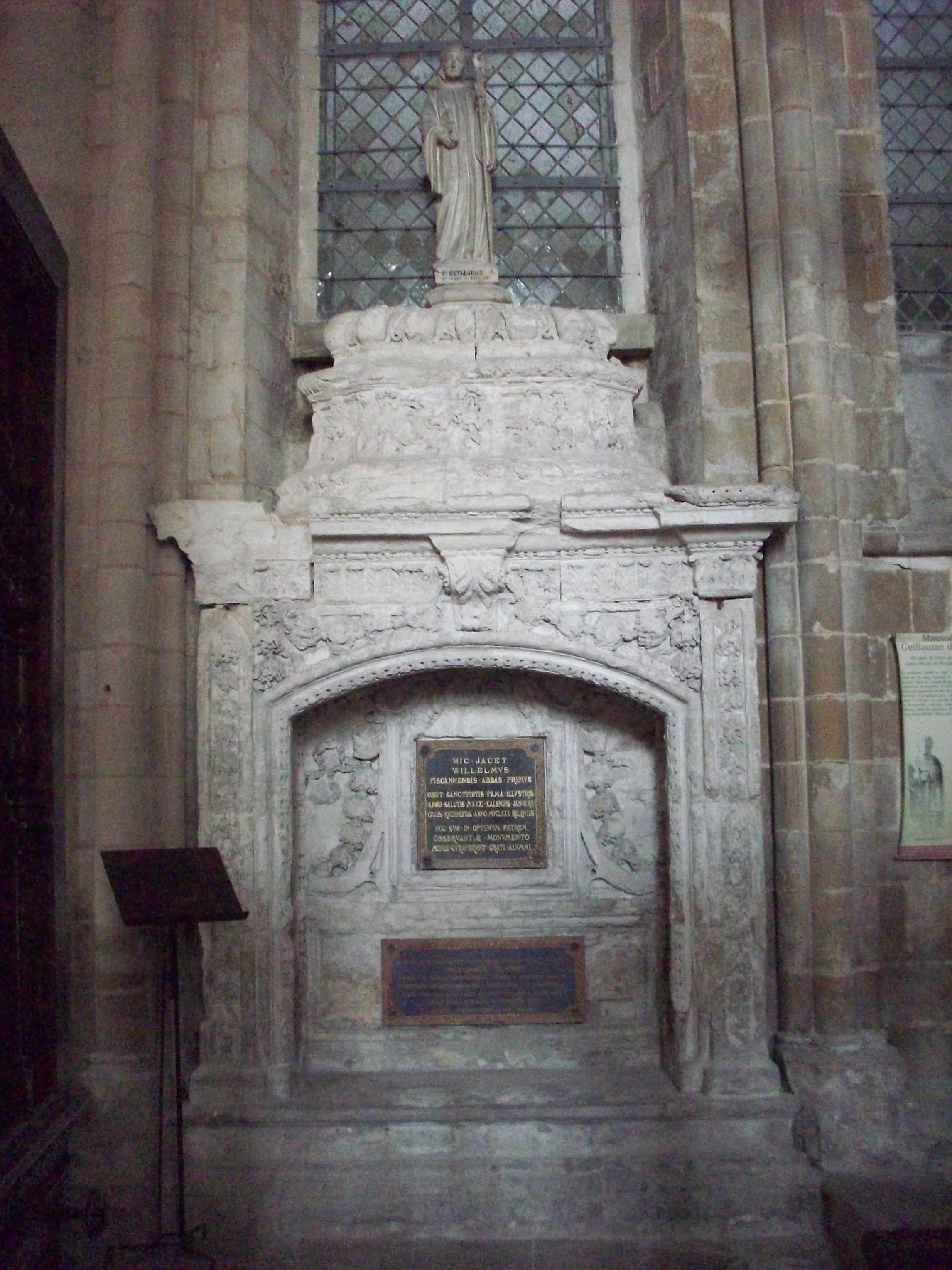
Tomb of St. William of Volpiano, in Fécamp Abbey.

St. Athanasius Volkhovsky, Bishop of Mogilev and Polotsk, Wonderworker of Poltava.

New Hieromartyr Platon (Kulbush), Bishop of Tallinn (Reval), Estonia.

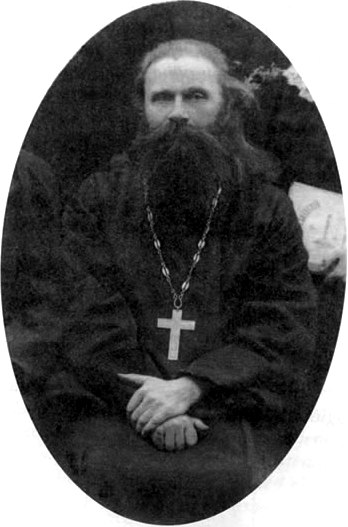
New Hieromartyr Michael Blaive, Archpriest.

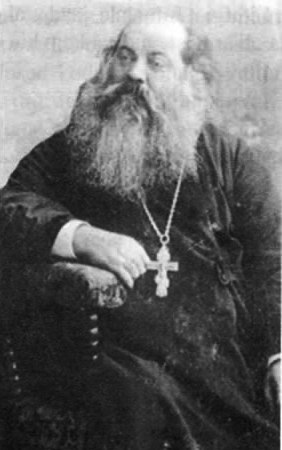
New Hieromartyr Nicholas Bezhanitsky, Archpriest.

New Hieromartyr Alexander (Trapitsyn), Archbishop of Samara.

New Hieromartyr Basil Vitevsky, Priest.

== Sources ==
- January 1/14. Orthodox Calendar (PRAVOSLAVIE.RU).
- January 14 / January 1. HOLY TRINITY RUSSIAN ORTHODOX CHURCH (A parish of the Patriarchate of Moscow).
- January 1. OCA - The Lives of the Saints.
- January 1. Latin Saints of the Orthodox Patriarchate of Rome.
- The Roman Martyrology. Transl. by the Archbishop of Baltimore. Last Edition, According to the Copy Printed at Rome in 1914. Revised Edition, with the Imprimatur of His Eminence Cardinal Gibbons. Baltimore: John Murphy Company, 1916. pp. 1–3.
- Rev. Richard Stanton. A Menology of England and Wales, or, Brief Memorials of the Ancient British and English Saints Arranged According to the Calendar, Together with the Martyrs of the 16th and 17th Centuries. London: Burns & Oates, 1892. p. 1.

Greek Sources

- Great Synaxaristes: (in Greek) 1 ΙΑΝΟΥΑΡΙΟΥ. ΜΕΓΑΣ ΣΥΝΑΞΑΡΙΣΤΗΣ.
- (in Greek) Συναξαριστής. 1 Ιανουαρίου. ECCLESIA.GR. (H ΕΚΚΛΗΣΙΑ ΤΗΣ ΕΛΛΑΔΟΣ).

Russian Sources

- (in Russian) 14 января (1 января). Православная Энциклопедия под редакцией Патриарха Московского и всея Руси Кирилла (электронная версия). (Orthodox Encyclopedia - Pravenc.ru).
- (in Russian) 1 января (ст.ст.) 14 января 2013 (нов. ст.). Русская Православная Церковь Отдел внешних церковных связей. (DECR).
