= Gordius =

Gordius may refer to:

- Gordius (worm), a genus of horsehair worms
- Gordias, or Gordius, an ancient royal family of Phrygia
- Saint Gordius (died c. 315), a Christian soldier and martyr in Cappadocia
