= January 2 (Eastern Orthodox liturgics) =

Day in the Eastern Orthodox liturgical calendar

Eastern Orthodox liturgical calendar
January 1	January 2	January 3
January 2 O.S. ≍ January 15 N.S. January 2 N.S ≍ December 20 O.S.

An Eastern Orthodox cross

January 2 in Eastern Orthodox liturgical calendars is a feast day and a day of commemoration of saints and martyrs. Although some Orthodox churches use the Revised Julian Calendar and others use the traditional Julian calendar, the fixed commemorations for their respective January 1 are broadly the same, no matter which calendar is used. (Note: Despite the dates being the same, the days to which they refer typically differ by 13 days. The notation Old Style or O.S. is sometimes used to indicate a date in the traditional Julian Calendar (the "Old Calendar"). The notation New Style or N.S, indicates a date in the Revised Julian calendar (the "New Calendar").)

== Feasts ==
- Forefeast of the Theophany of Our Lord and Savior Jesus Christ (Note: The first day of the Forefeast of Theophany falls on January 2. Like the hymns for the Nativity, many of the Church's hymns of this period are slightly modified versions of the hymns of Holy Week. One of the hymns at Matins today says that the coming Feast of Theophany will be "even more radiant" than the Feast of the Nativity.)

== Saints ==
- Saint Theodota, mother of the first Saints Cosmas and Damian (3rd century)
- Martyr Sergius, by the sword, at Caesarea in Cappadocia (301)
- Martyr Theopistus (Theopistos), by stoning
- Hieromartyr Theogenes, Bishop of Parium on the Hellespont (c. 320)
- Saint Sylvester I, Pope of Rome (335) (see also December 31 - Latin Calendar)
- Martyr Basil of Ancyra, under Julian the Apostate (362) (see also January 1 - Russian)
- Hieromartyr Isidore, Bishop of Antioch, by the Arians (4th century)
- Righteous Theopemptos, Monk
- Venerable Mark the Deaf Mute
- Saint Amun (Ammon) of Tabennisi, monk (5th century)

== Pre-Schism Western saints ==
- Martyrs Artaxus, Acutus, Eugenda, Maximianus, Timothy, Tobias and Vitus, in Syrmium in Pannonia (3rd–4th century)
- Martyrs of Rome, many martyrs who suffered in Rome under Diocletian for refusing to give up the Holy Scriptures (c. 303) (Note: "At Rome, the commemoration of many holy martyrs, who, despising the edict of the emperor Diocletian, which ordered that the sacred books should be delivered up, preferred to surrender themselves to the executioners rather than to give holy things to dogs.")
- Thousand Martyrs of Lichfield ('field of bodies'), also called the "Thousand Martyrs of Verulam", in England (c. 303): (Note: "The Christians of Britain appear to have escaped unharmed in the earlier persecutions which afflicted the Church; but the cruel edicts of Diocletian were enforced in every corner of the empire, and the faithful inhabitants of this land, whether native Britons or Roman colonists, were called upon to furnish their full number of holy Martyrs and Confessors. The names of few are on record; but the British historian, St. Gildas, after relating the martyrdom of St. Alban, tells us that many others were seized, some put to the most unheard-of tortures, and others immediately executed, while not a few hid themselves in forests and deserts and the caves of the earth, where they endured a prolonged death until God called them to their reward. The same writer attributes it to the subsequent invasion of the English, then a pagan people, that the recollection of the places, sanctified by these martyrdoms, has been lost, and so little honour paid to their memory. It may be added that, according to one tradition, a thousand of these Christians were overtaken in their flight near Lichfield, and cruelly massacred, and that the name of Lichfield, or field of the Dead, is derived from them.") (Note: There is however, no evidence to support this legend.)

- Hieromartyr Amphibalos and 999 others at Lichfield, under Diocletian.

- Saint Martinianus (Maternian), Bishop of Milan, Italy, took part in the Third Oecumenical Council at Ephesus and wrote against Nestorianism (c. 435)
- Saint Aspasius, Bishop of Auch, France, took part in the Second, Fourth, and Fifth Councils of Orleans in 533, 541 and 549, besides holding a council in Auch in 551 (c. 560)
- Saint Schottin (Schotin, Scarthin), hermit of Kilkenny, Ireland (6th century) (Note: "ST. SCOTHIN was a native of Ireland, who came over to Britain and was the disciple of St. David in Wales. He afterwards returned to his own country, and lived as a solitary at Mount Mairge in Queen's County, where full of merits he gave up his soul to God.") (see also January 6)
- Saint Seiriol the Righteous, Abbott of Penmon Priory, brother of King Cynlas of Rhos and King Einion of Llŷn (6th century) (see also February 1 - Latin Calendar)
- Saint Munchin the Wise (Mainchín of Limerick), probably the first Bishop of Limerick and also its patron-saint (late 6th century)
- Saint Blidulf (Bladulf), a monk at Bobbio Abbey, Italy who bravely denounced the heresy of the Lombard King Ariovald, an Arian (c. 630)
- Saint Vincentian (Viance, Viants), a disciple of Saint Menelaus, he became a hermit near Tulle in Auvergne, France (c. 730)
- Saint Adalard of Corbie (827) (Note: He entered the monastery of Corbie in the north of France, where he became abbot. Exiled, he founded New Corbie (Corvey) in Saxony, Germany.)

== Post-Schism Orthodox saints ==
- Saint Cosmas I the Jerusalemite and Wonderworker, Patriarch of Constantinople (1081)
- Venerable Sylvester the Wonderworker of the Kiev Near Caves (12th century) (Note: Saint Sylvester of the Caves lived during the twelfth century and was igumen of the Mikhailovsk Vydubitsk monastery at Kiev. He continued the work of St. Nestor the Chronicler (October 27) and he wrote nine Lives of the holy saints of the Kiev Caves. In the service to the Fathers venerated in the Near Caves, St. Sylvester is called blessed and endowed with "a miraculous gift to ward off demonic suggestions (Ode 9 of the Canon). St. Sylvester was buried in the Near Caves, and his memory is celebrated on September 28, and on the second Sunday of Great Lent.)
- Venerable Neilos (Nilos, Nilus) Erichiotis the Sanctified (1334) (see also August 16)
- Righteous Juliana the Merciful of Lazarevo and Murom (1604)
- Repose (1833) and Second Finding (1991) of the Relics of Venerable Seraphim, Wonderworker of Sarov. (Note: The second finding of his relics occurred in 1991. A procession formed to escort the relics, on foot, all the way from Moscow to Diveyevo Convent, where they remain to this day.)
- Venerable Gennadios of Kerkyra (1859)

=== New martyrs and confessors ===
- New Martyr George (Zorzes, Zorsisus) the Georgian, at Mytilene (1770)
- New Martyr Basil Petrov (1942)

== Other commemorations ==
- Repose of Hieroschemamonk Gabriel of Optina Monastery and Whitehoof Convent (1871)
- Repose of Abbess Thaisia (Solopova) of Leushino Monastery (1915) (Note: (in Russian) Webpage of the Leushino Monastery, now submerged under the waters of the Rybinsk Sea.) (Note: See: (in Russian) Таисия (Солопова). Википедии. (Russian Wikipedia).)
- Martyred Elder Ioasaph of St. Tikhon of Kaluga Monastery (1919)
- Birth (1858) of New Confessor Smaragda (Onishchenko), Abbess of Nezhinsk (uk), Ukraine (1945) (Note: See: (in Ukrainian) Смарагда (Онищенко) Ніжинська. Вікіпедія. (Ukrainian Wikipedia).) (see also December 28 - feast day; and April 20 - glorification)
- Repose of Elder Iakovos of Epirus (1961)

== Icon gallery ==
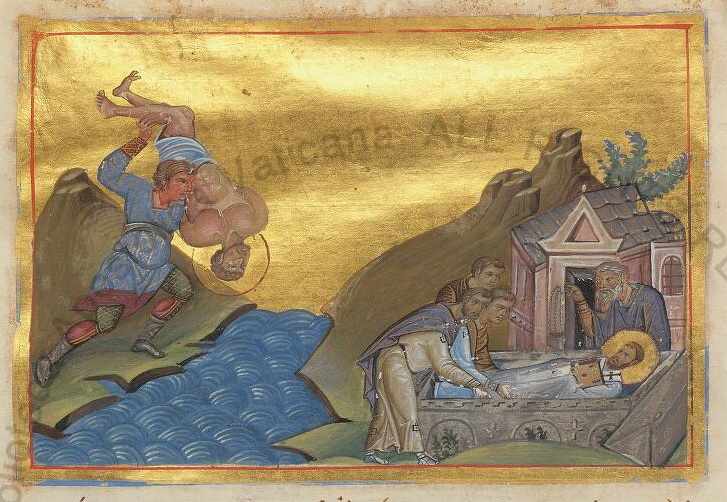
Hieromartyr Theogenes, Bishop of Parium on the Hellespont.
(Menologion of Basil II, 10th century).

St. Sylvester, Pope of Rome.
(Menologion of Basil II, 10th century).

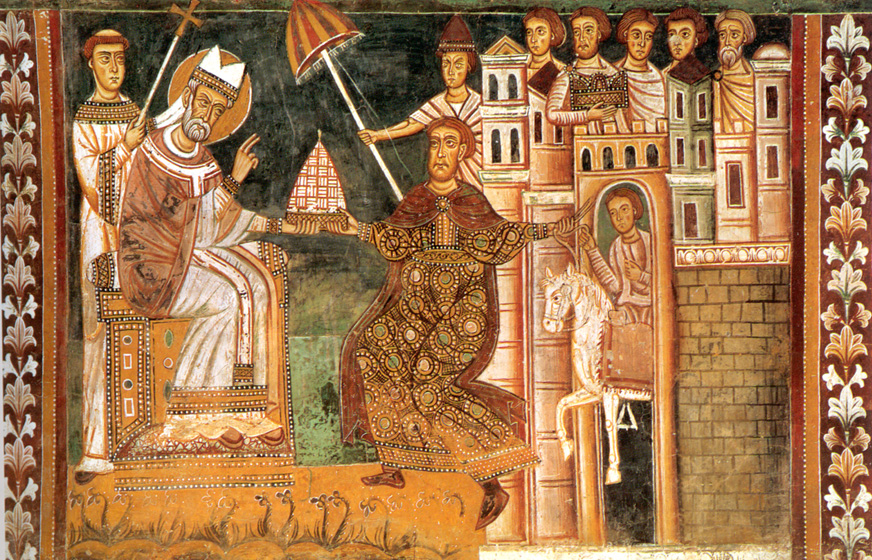
St. Sylvester, Pope of Rome, and the Emperor Constantine the Great.

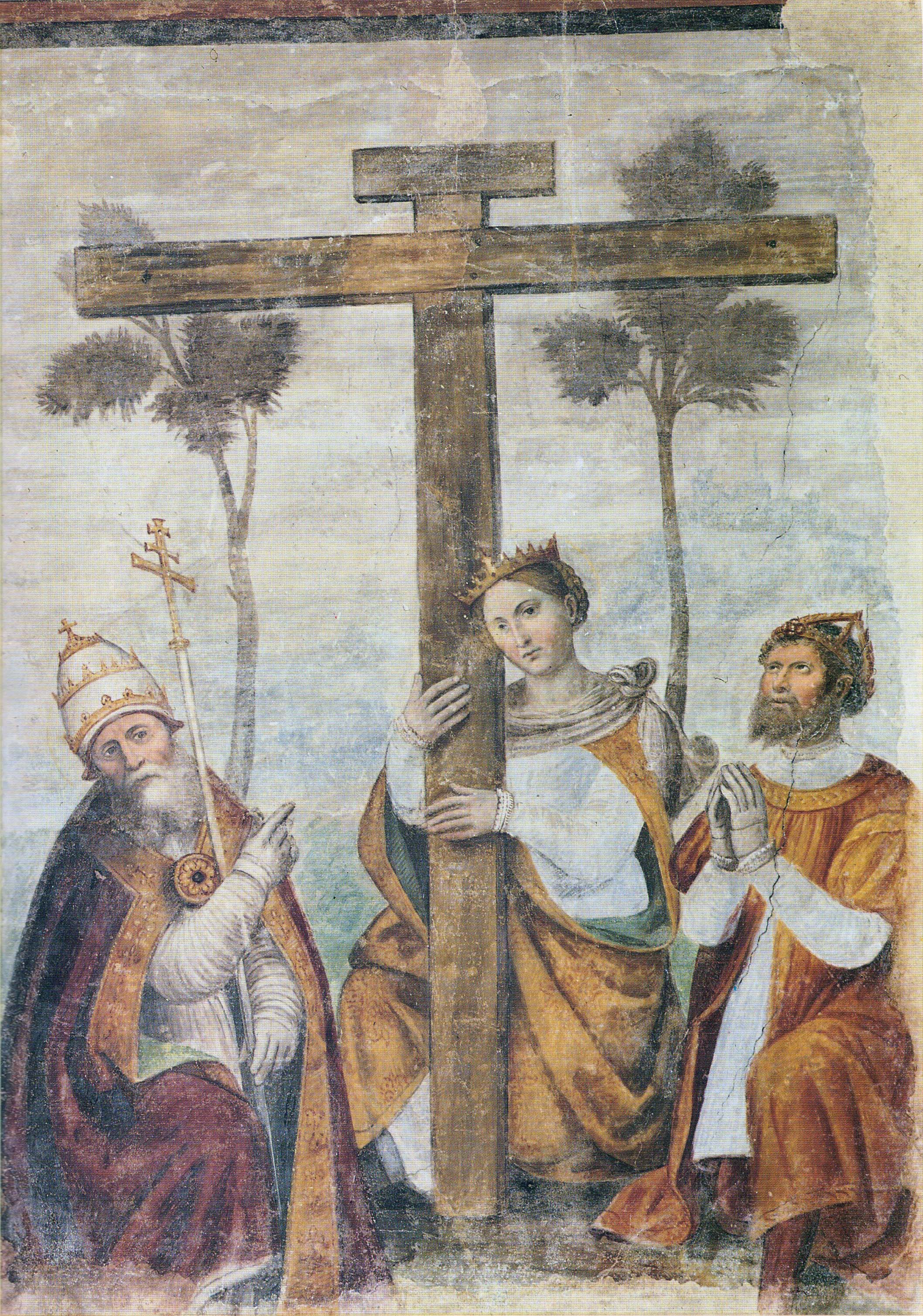
Adoration of the Cross by Pope St. Sylvester I, Empress Helena and Emperor Constantine.

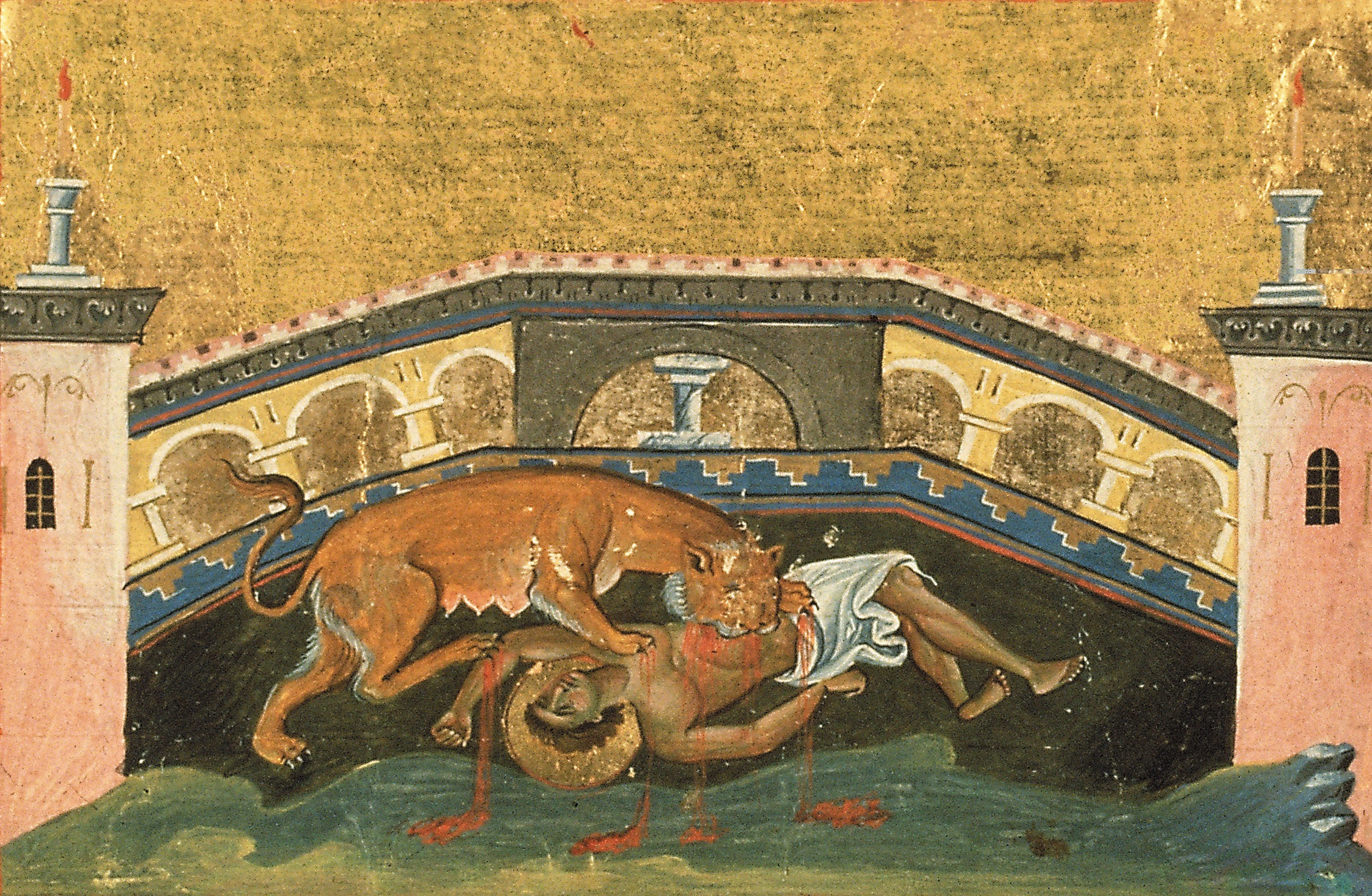
Martyr Basil of Ancyra
(Menologion of Basil II, 10th century).

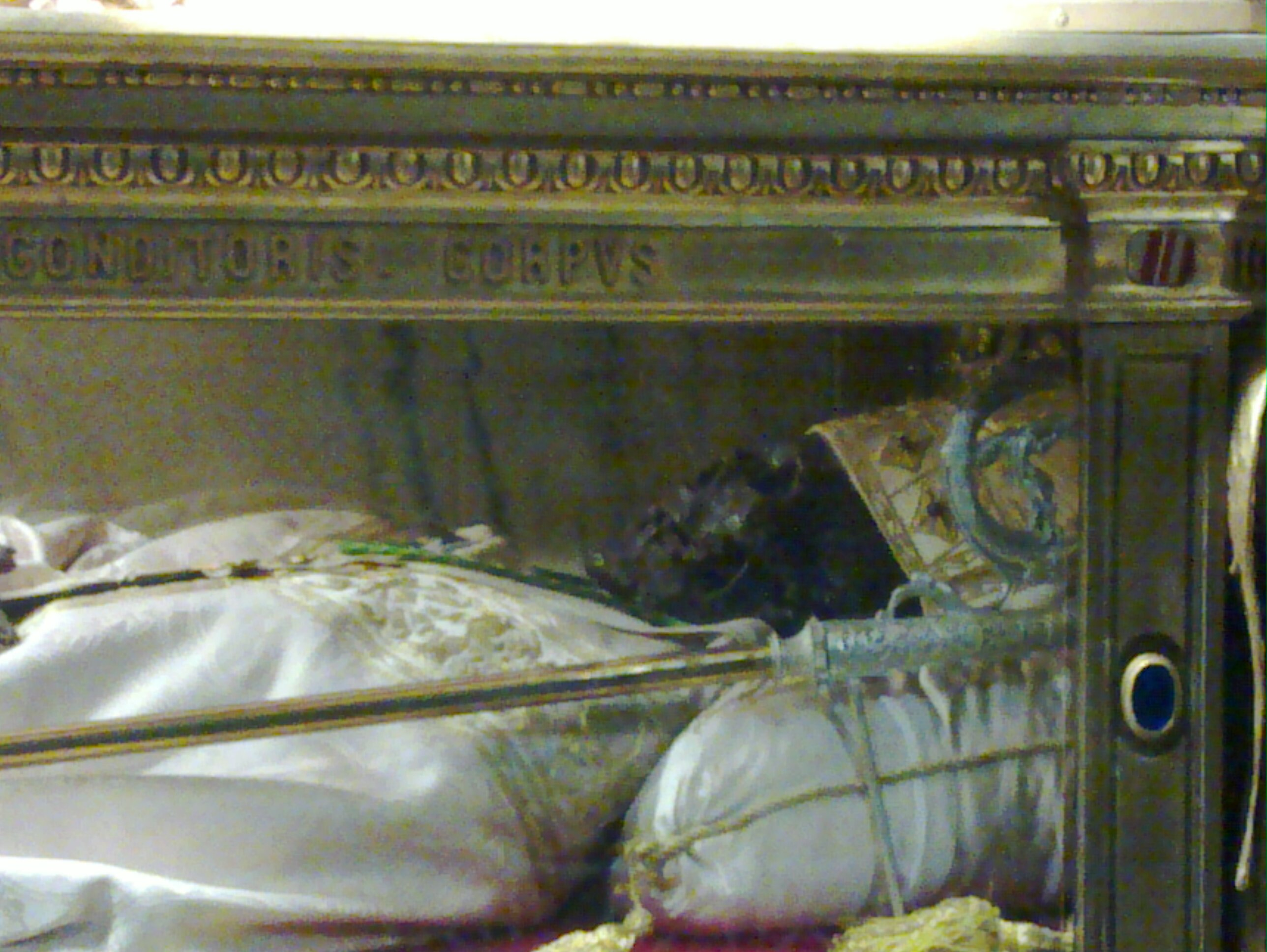
Relics of Saint Martinianus of Milan, in the Cathedral of Milan.

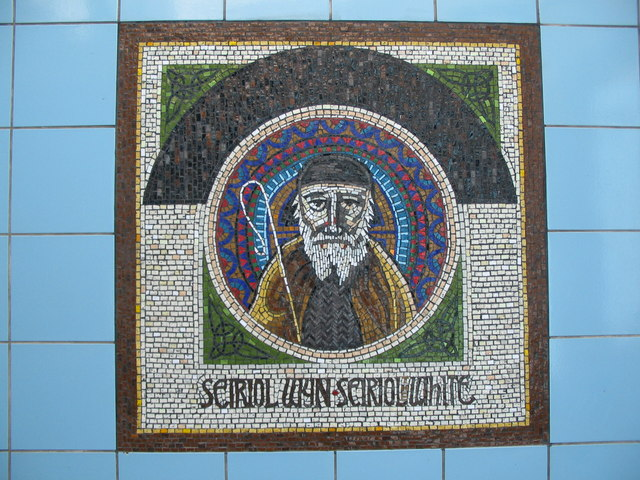
Mosaic of Saint Seiriol the Righteous, Abbott of Penmon Priory.

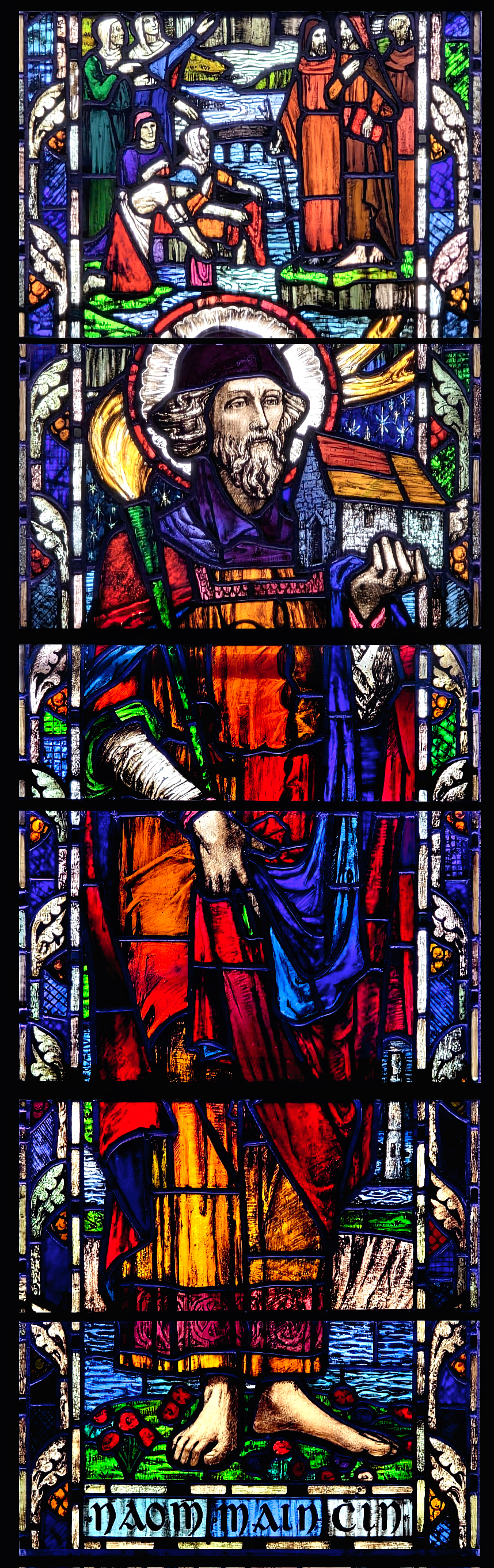
St. Mainchín of Limerick.

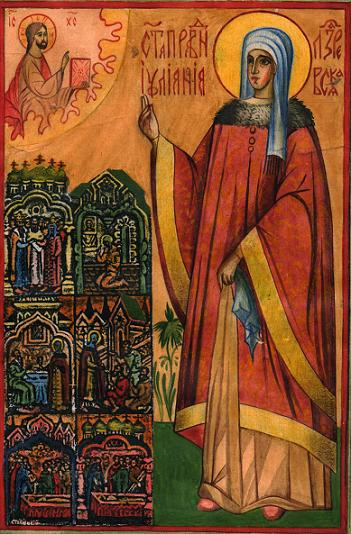
Righteous Juliana of Lazarevo.

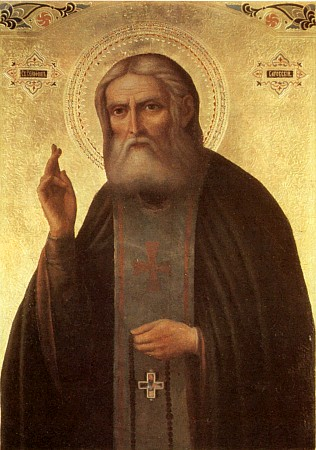
Saint Seraphim of Sarov, Wonderworker.

Abbess Thaisia (Solopova) of Leushino Monastery.

== Sources ==
- January 2/January 15. Orthodox Calendar (PRAVOSLAVIE.RU).
- January 15 / January 2. HOLY TRINITY RUSSIAN ORTHODOX CHURCH (A parish of the Patriarchate of Moscow).
- January 2. OCA - The Lives of the Saints.
- The Autonomous Orthodox Metropolia of Western Europe and the Americas (ROCOR). St. Hilarion Calendar of Saints for the year of our Lord 2004. St. Hilarion Press (Austin, TX). p. 4.
- January 2. Latin Saints of the Orthodox Patriarchate of Rome.
- The Roman Martyrology. Transl. by the Archbishop of Baltimore. Last Edition, According to the Copy Printed at Rome in 1914. Revised Edition, with the Imprimatur of His Eminence Cardinal Gibbons. Baltimore: John Murphy Company, 1916. pp. 3–4.

Greek Sources

- Great Synaxaristes: (in Greek) 2 ΙΑΝΟΥΑΡΙΟΥ. ΜΕΓΑΣ ΣΥΝΑΞΑΡΙΣΤΗΣ.
- (in Greek) Συναξαριστής. 2 Ιανουαρίου. ECCLESIA.GR. (H ΕΚΚΛΗΣΙΑ ΤΗΣ ΕΛΛΑΔΟΣ).

Russian Sources

- (in Russian) 15 января (2 января). Православная Энциклопедия под редакцией Патриарха Московского и всея Руси Кирилла (электронная версия). (Orthodox Encyclopedia - Pravenc.ru).
- (in Russian) 2 января (ст.ст.) 15 января 2014 (нов. ст.). Русская Православная Церковь Отдел внешних церковных связей. (DECR).
