= December 21 (Eastern Orthodox liturgics) =

Day in the Eastern Orthodox liturgical calendar

Eastern Orthodox liturgical calendar
December 20	December 21	December 22
December 21 O.S. ≍ January 3 N.S. December 21 N.S ≍ December 8 O.S.

An Eastern Orthodox cross

December 21 in Eastern Orthodox liturgical calendars is a feast day and a day of commemoration of saints and martyrs. Although some Orthodox churches use the Revised Julian Calendar and others use the traditional Julian calendar, the fixed commemorations for their respective December 21 are broadly the same, no matter which calendar is used. (Note: Despite the dates being the same, the days to which they refer typically differ by 13 days. The notation Old Style or O.S. is sometimes used to indicate a date in the traditional Julian Calendar (the "Old Calendar"). The notation New Style or N.S. indicates a date in the Revised Julian calendar (the "New Calendar").)

== Feasts ==
- Forefeast of the Nativity of Christ (Note: The Forefeast of the Nativity of the Lord begins on December 20. From now on, most of the liturgical hymns will be concerned with the birth of the Savior.)

== Saints ==
- Martyr Themistocles of Myra in Lycia (251) (Note: The Holy Martyr Themistocles lived in the city of Myra of Lycia during the reign of the persecutor of Christians, Decius (249-251). Themistocles was a shepherd. During the persecution he concealed within his home a certain Christian named Dioskorides, while he himself went out to the pursuers. They tortured him cruelly, and he received a martyr's crown for Christ in the year 251.) (Note: "In Lycia, St. Themistocles, martyr, who under the emperor Decius, offered himself in the place of St. Dioscorus, who was sought after to be killed, and being racked, dragged about and beaten with rods, obtained the crown of martyrdom.")
- Virgin Martyr Juliana of Nicomedia, and with her 500 men by the sword, and 130 women by beheading (304)
- Venerable Macarius the Faster, Abbot of Khakhuli Monastery (c. 1034)

== Pre-Schism Western saints ==
- Saint Honoratus of Toulouse, born in Spain, he succeeded Saint Saturninus as Bishop of Toulouse in France (3rd century)
- Saint Severinus of Trier, Bishop of Trier in Germany (c. 300) (Note: "At Treves, St. Severin, bishop and confessor.")
- Martyrs John and Festus, martyrs honoured in Tuscany in Italy
- Saint Baudacarius, A monk at Bobbio Abbey in the north of Italy (650)
- Saint Hincmar, Archbishop of Reims (882)
- Saint Beornwald of Bampton (Bernwald), a righteous priest in Bampton in Oxfordshire in England (10th century)
- Saint John Vincent, born in Ravenna, he became a monk at St. Michael in Chiusa, then a hermit on Monte Caprario (it), finally he became Bishop nearby (1012)

== Post-Schism Orthodox saints ==
- Saint Peter of Moscow, Metropolitan of Kiev and Moscow, Wonderworker of All Russia (1326)
- Saint Juliana, Princess of Vyazma (Novotorzhok) (1406)
- Blessed Procopius of Vyatka, Fool-for-Christ (1627) (Note: Blessed Procopius, Fool-for-Christ, of Vyatka, was the son of pious peasants. When Procopius reached age twenty, they wanted him to marry, but he secretly went to the city of Khlynov and took upon himself the feat of foolishness. The holy fool endured hunger, cold, mocking and insults. The Lord glorified him with the gift of clairvoyance. Blessed Procopius died at the age of forty-nine in 1627.)
- Righteous-Virgin Yulianiya Solvychegodska (17th century)
- Saint Anton II, Catholicos-Patriarch of All Georgia (1827)
- Saint Philaret (Theodosius in schema), Metropolitan of Kiev (1857) (Note: See: (in Russian) Филарет (Амфитеатров). Википедии. (Russian Wikipedia).)

=== New martyrs and confessors ===
- New Hieromartyr Michael Kiselev, Priest, at Perm (1918)
- New Hieromartyr Sergius, Deacon (1937)
- New Hieromartyr Nicetas Pribytkov, Bishop of Belev (Belevsk) (1937) (Note: On December 16, 1937, Bishop Nicetas (Pribytkov) was arrested together with priests, monks, nuns, novices and three laypeople in “The Case of Bishop Nicetas (Pribytkov), Tula province, 1937”.) (Note: See: (in Russian) Никита (Прибытков). Википедии. (Russian Wikipedia).)
- New Hieromartyr Leontius, Deacon (1940)

== Other commemorations ==
- Finding of the relics (1950) of New Monk-Martyr Ephraim of Nea Makri (1426) (Note: The Discovery of his relics took place on January 3, 1950. Believers regard him as a "newly revealed" (Greek: "νεοφανείς") saint, whose existence is a matter of divine revelation rather than historical proof.) (see also: January 3 - N.S.; and May 5 - feast day)
- Repose of Blessed Peter "the Nose" of Kama (c. 1938)
- Repose of Schemamonk Michael of Harbin (1939)
- Repose of Mother Stavritsa, missionary in Kenya (2000)

== Icon gallery ==
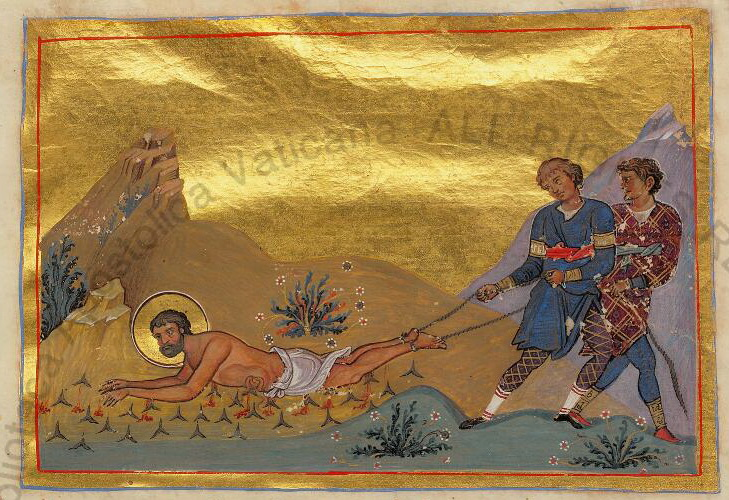
Martyr Themistocles of Myra in Lycia.
(Menologion of Basil II, 10th century).

Virgin Martyr Juliana of Nicomedia.
(Menologion of Basil II, 10th century).

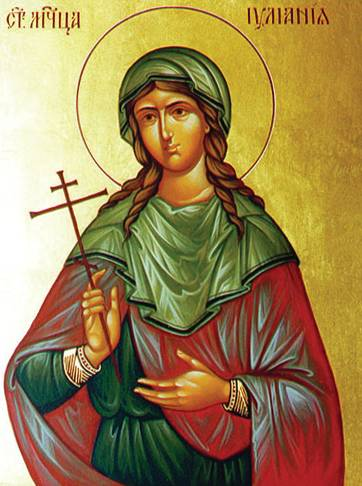
St. Juliana of Nicomedia.

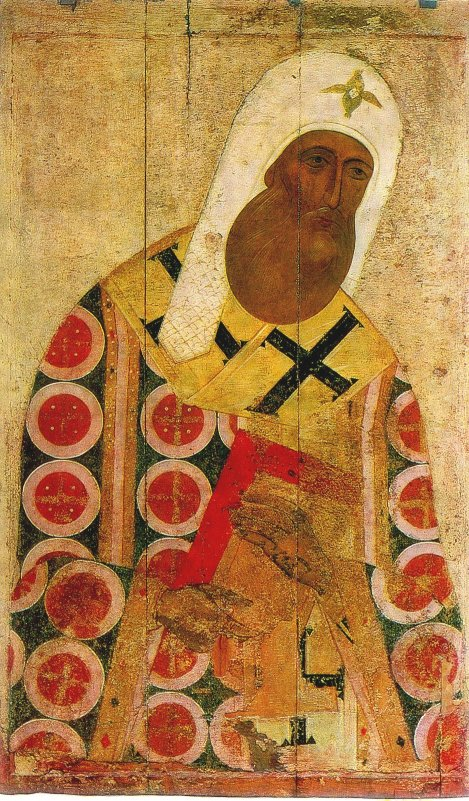
St. Peter of Moscow, Metropolitan of Kiev and Moscow, Wonderworker of All Russia.

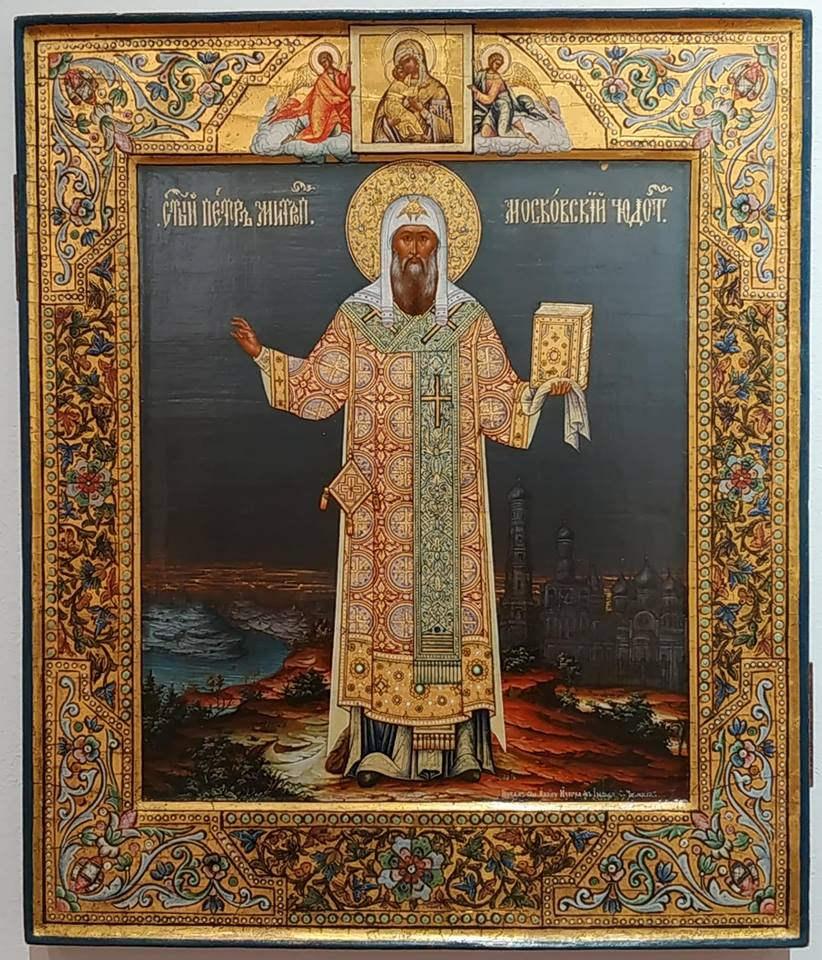
St. Peter of Moscow.

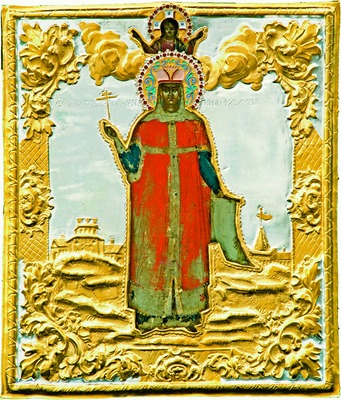
St. Juliana, Princess of Vyazma, Novotorzhok.

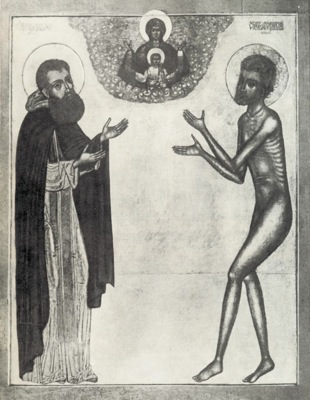
Icon of St. Tryphon of Vyatka and Procopius Vyatka (17th century, Vyatka (Kirov) Museum).

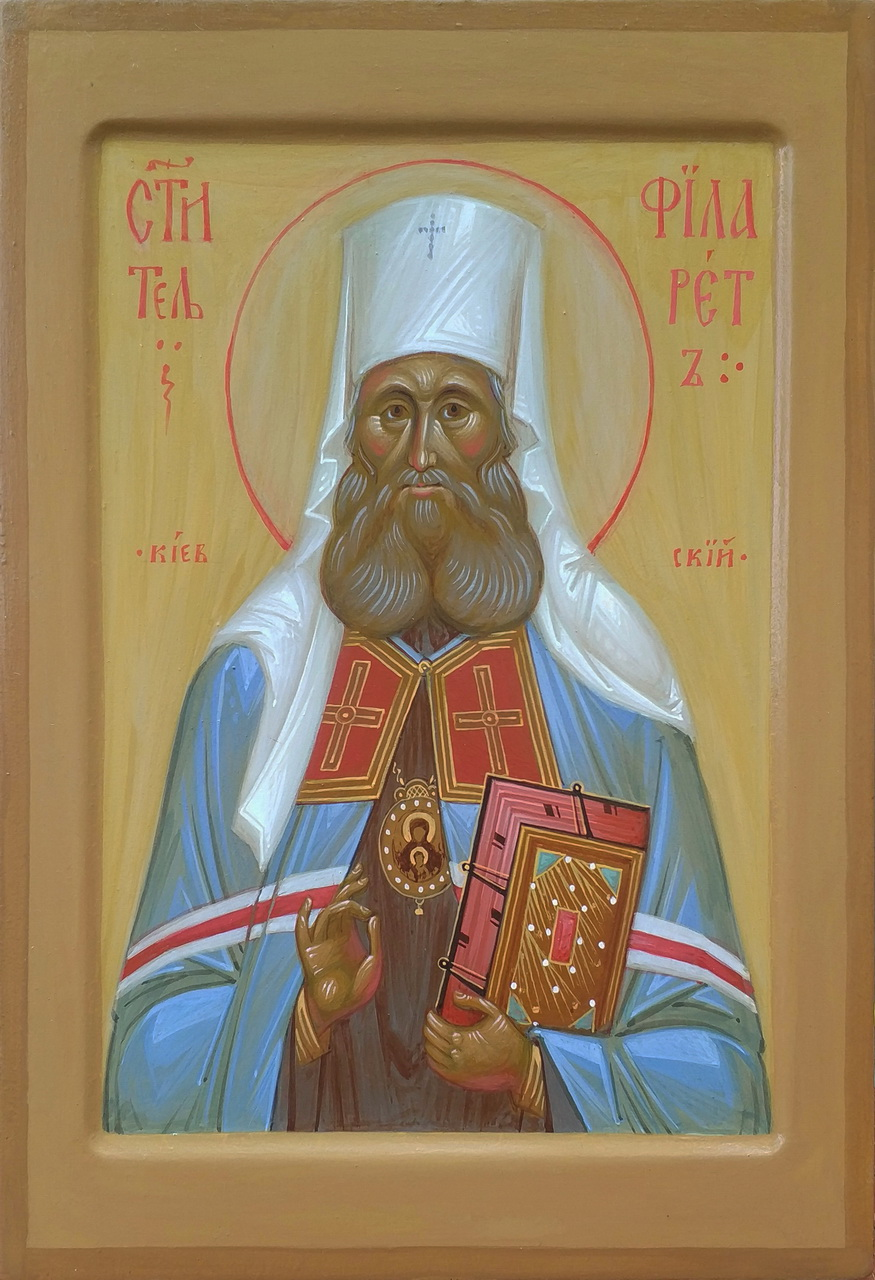
St. Philaret (Theodosius in schema), Metropolitan of Kiev.

New Hieromartyr Nicetas Pribytkov, Bishop of Belev (Belevsk).

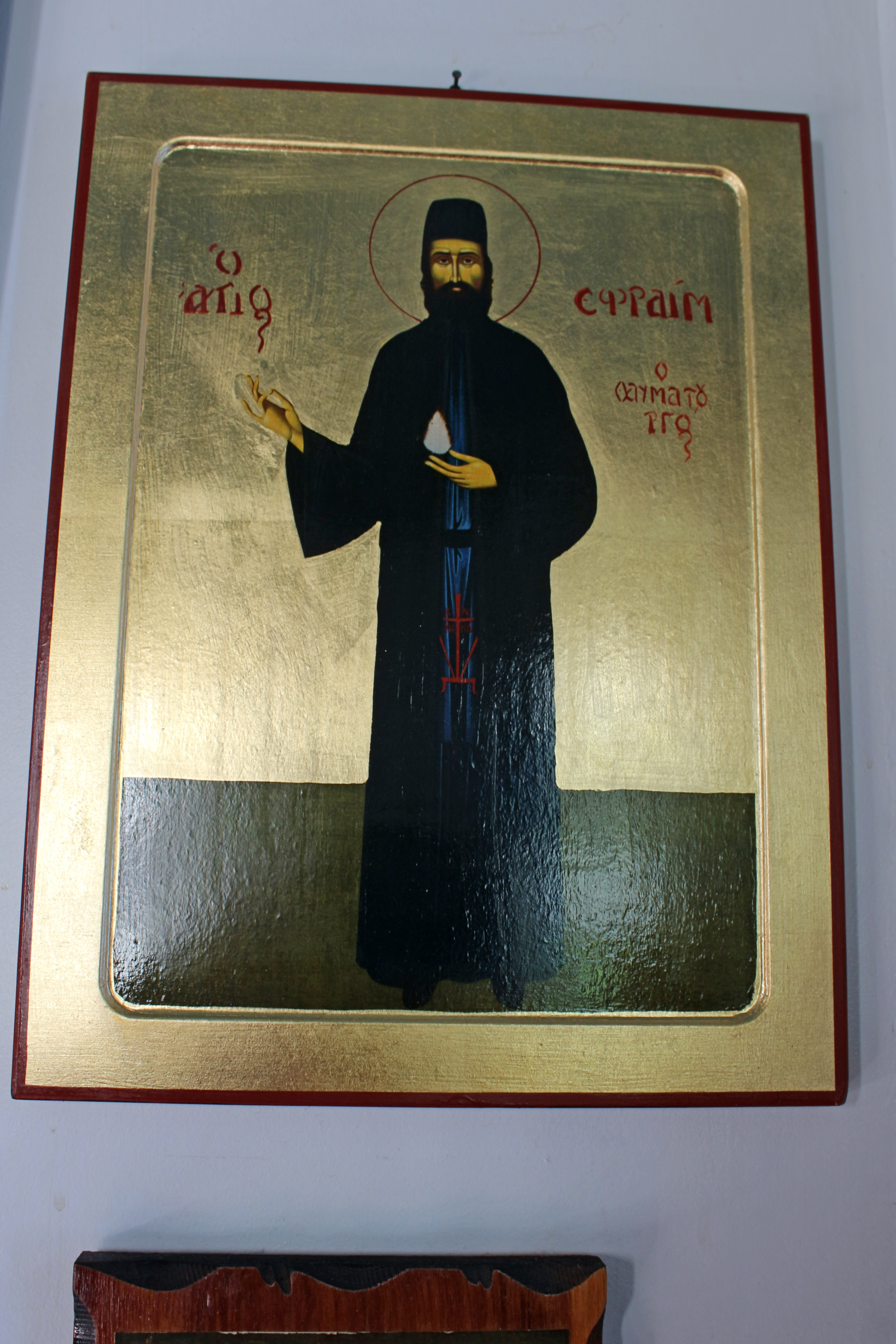
New Monk-Martyr Ephraim of Nea Makri.

== Sources ==
- December 21/January 3. Orthodox Calendar (PRAVOSLAVIE.RU).
- January 3 / December 21. HOLY TRINITY RUSSIAN ORTHODOX CHURCH (A parish of the Patriarchate of Moscow).
- December 21. OCA - The Lives of the Saints.
- The Autonomous Orthodox Metropolia of Western Europe and the Americas (ROCOR). St. Hilarion Calendar of Saints for the year of our Lord 2004. St. Hilarion Press (Austin, TX). p. 1.
- December 21. Latin Saints of the Orthodox Patriarchate of Rome.
- The Roman Martyrology. Transl. by the Archbishop of Baltimore. Last Edition, According to the Copy Printed at Rome in 1914. Revised Edition, with the Imprimatur of His Eminence Cardinal Gibbons. Baltimore: John Murphy Company, 1916.

Greek Sources

- Great Synaxaristes: (in Greek) 21 ΔΕΚΕΜΒΡΙΟΥ. ΜΕΓΑΣ ΣΥΝΑΞΑΡΙΣΤΗΣ.
- (in Greek) Συναξαριστής. 21 Δεκεμβρίου. ECCLESIA.GR. (H ΕΚΚΛΗΣΙΑ ΤΗΣ ΕΛΛΑΔΟΣ).

Russian Sources

- (in Russian) 3 января (21 декабря). Православная Энциклопедия под редакцией Патриарха Московского и всея Руси Кирилла (электронная версия). (Orthodox Encyclopedia - Pravenc.ru).
- (in Russian) 21 декабря (ст.ст.) 3 января 2015 (нов. ст.). Русская Православная Церковь Отдел внешних церковных связей. (DECR).
