= December 20 (Eastern Orthodox liturgics) =

Day in the Eastern Orthodox liturgical calendar

Eastern Orthodox liturgical calendar
December 19	December 20	December 21
December 20 O.S. ≍ January 2 N.S. December 20 N.S ≍ December 7 O.S.

An Eastern Orthodox cross

December 20 in Eastern Orthodox liturgical calendars is a feast day and a day of commemoration of saints and martyrs. Although some Orthodox churches use the Revised Julian Calendar and others use the traditional Julian calendar, the fixed commemorations for their respective December 20 are broadly the same, no matter which calendar is used. (Note: Despite the dates being the same, the days to which they refer typically differ by 13 days. The notation Old Style or O.S. is sometimes used to indicate a date in the traditional Julian Calendar (the "Old Calendar"). The notation New Style or N.S. indicates a date in the Revised Julian calendar (the "New Calendar").)

== Feasts ==
- Forefeast of the Nativity of Christ (Note: The Forefeast of the Nativity of the Lord begins on December 20. From now on, most of the liturgical hymns will be concerned with the birth of the Savior. Many of the Church's hymns of this period are slightly modified versions of the hymns of Holy Week.)

== Saints ==
- Hieromartyr Ignatius Theophorus (the God-bearer), Bishop of Antioch (107) (see also January 29)
- Saint Philogonius, Bishop of Antioch, Confessor (322–324) (Note: "Saint Philogonios, Bishop of Antioch, before his installation upon the bishop's cathedra-seat, was a lawyer-advocate, who came forth in defense of the poor, the widowed and the orphaned. When his wife died, they chose him as bishop of Antioch. Distinguished by profound theological knowledge, Saint Philogonios successfully defended Orthodoxy against the Arian heresy and by this prevented unrest in the Church. During the time of persecution against Christians under the emperors Maximian (305–311) and Licinius (307–324), Saint Philogonios proved himself a confessor of the Orthodox faith. He died peacefully in about the year 323. In the year 386 Saint John Chrysostom preached an eulogy to Saint Philogonios.") (Note: "At Antioch, the birthday of St. Philogonius, bishop, who was called by the will of God from the practice of law to the government of that church. With the saintly bishop Alexander and other auxiliaries, he engaged the first combat for the Catholic faith against Arius, and, being renowned for merits, rested in the Lord. His festival was commemorated by St. John Chrysostom with an excellent panegyric.")
- Saint Paul of Latrus (Latra), Greek hermit (c. 956)

== Pre-Schism Western saints ==
- Martyrs Liberatus and Bajulus, at Rome
- Saint Ursicinus, Bishop of Cahors in France (c. 585) (Note: He is often mentioned by St. Gregory of Tours.)
- Saint Dominic of Brescia, successor of Saint Anastasius as Bishop of Brescia in Italy (c. 612)
- Saint Ursicinus, born in Ireland, disciple of Saint Columbanus, and founder of the monastery of Saint-Ursanne (c. 625)

== Post-Schism Orthodox saints ==
- Saint Danilo (Daniel) II, Archbishop of Serbia (1338)
- Venerable Ignatius, Archimandrite of the Kiev Caves (1435)
- Saint Anthony Smirnitsky, Archbishop of Voronezh (1846)
- Righteous John of Kronstadt, Wonderworker (1908) (see also October 19)
- Venerable Serafim (Popescu) the Long-Suffering of Sâmbăta de Sus, Archimandrite (1990) (Note: See: (in Romanian) Serafim Popescu. Wikipedia. (Romanian Wikipedia).)

=== New martyrs and confessors ===
- New Martyr John the Tailor of Thasos, at Constantinople, by beheading (1652)
- New Hieromartyr Nikolai Chernishev, Archpriest of Udmurtia (east of Kazan), and his daughter, New Martyr Barbara (1919) (Note: "Archpriest Nikolai Chernishev served as a priest of what is today known as Udmurtia, east of Kazan, from 1914 until his death in 1919. He was repeatedly awarded by diocesan authorities for his impeccable service to the Orthodox Church. He founded the local Sobriety Society with the blessing of St. John of Kronstadt... ...Archpriest Nikolai and his daughter Barbara were shot on January 2, 1920 (new style). Before his execution, Fr. Nikolai was required to move his cross, but he objected, “I am going to die, then you can remove it.” They were both buried in the cemetery at the Transfiguration Cathedral. Their graves have become a place of veneration and there are instances of miraculous help by the prayers of Fr. Nikolai for overcoming alcoholism.")

== Other commemorations ==
- Icon of the Mother of God the Rescuer of the Drowning
- Icon of the Mother of God of Novgorod.

== Icon gallery ==
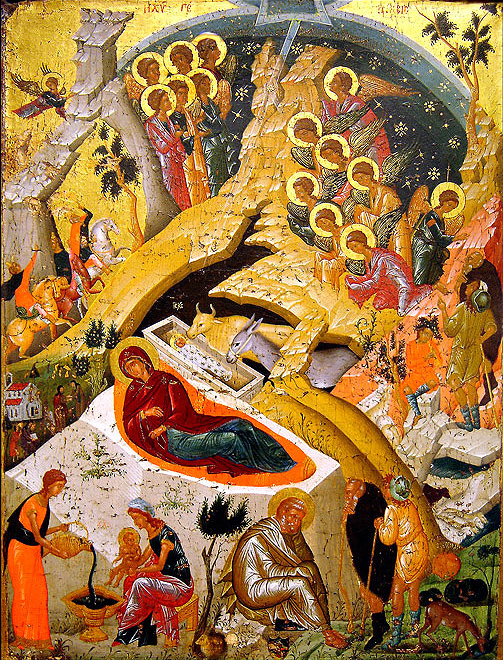
Byzantine icon of Nativity of Christ (Byzantine & Christian Museum, Athens).

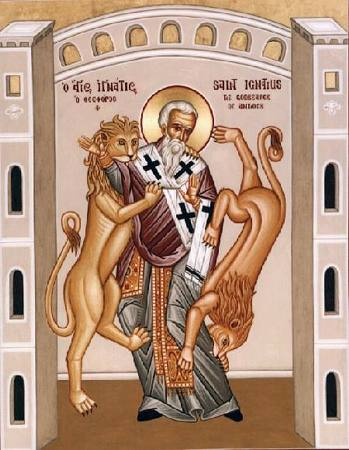
St. Ignatius of Antioch.

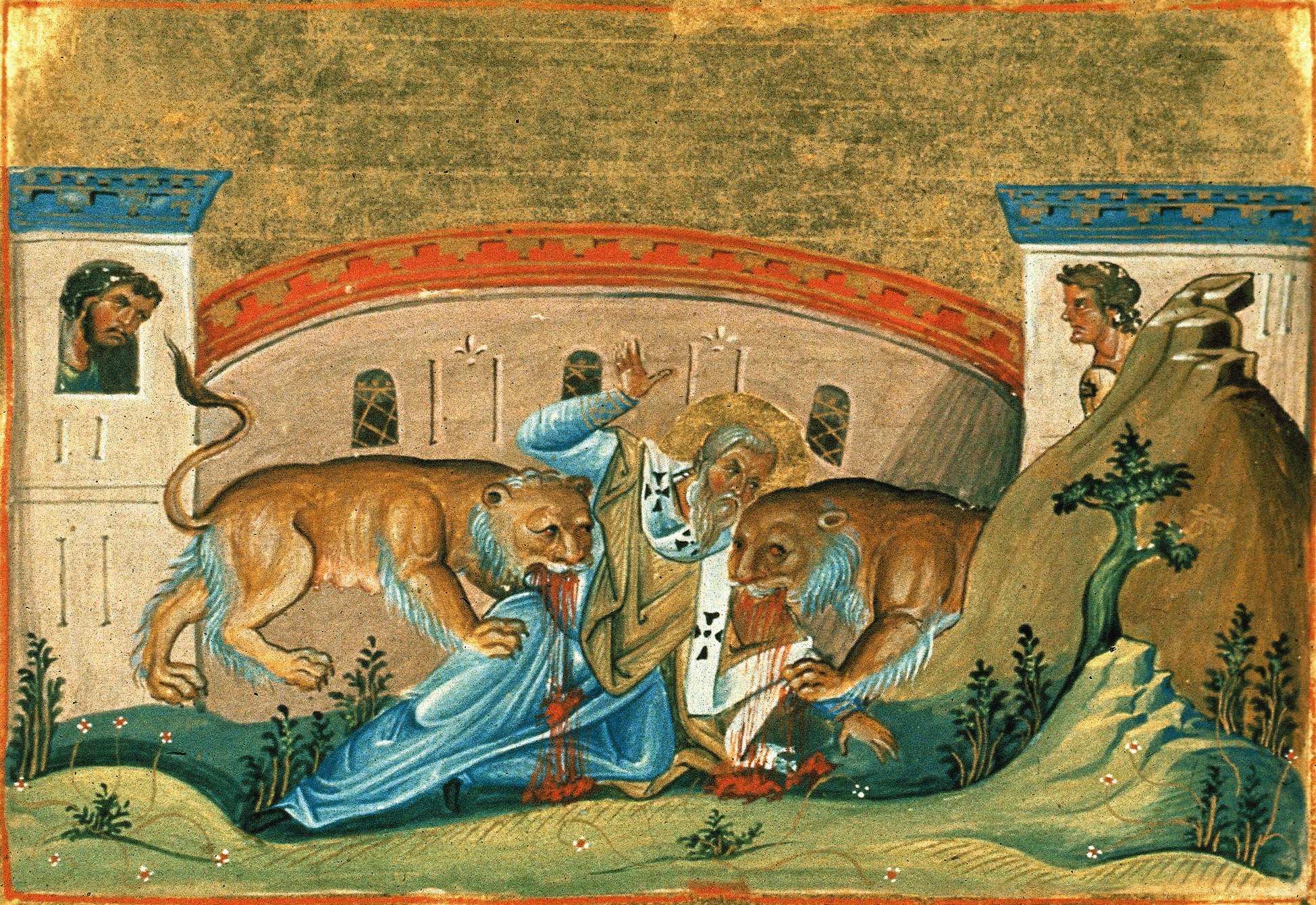
St. Ignatius of Antioch.
(Menologion of Basil II, 10th century).

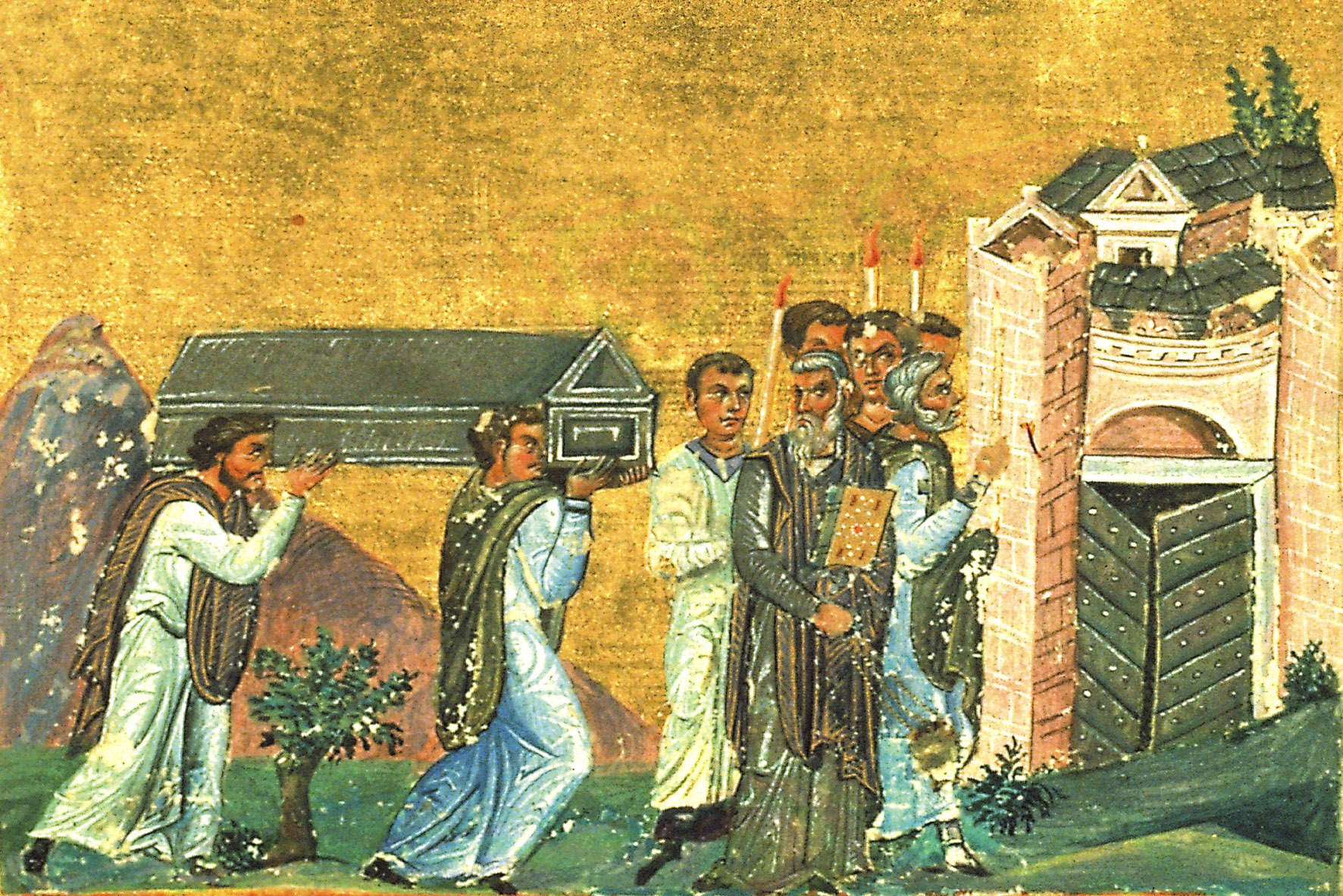
Relics of St. Ignatius of Antioch.
(Menologion of Basil II, 10th century).

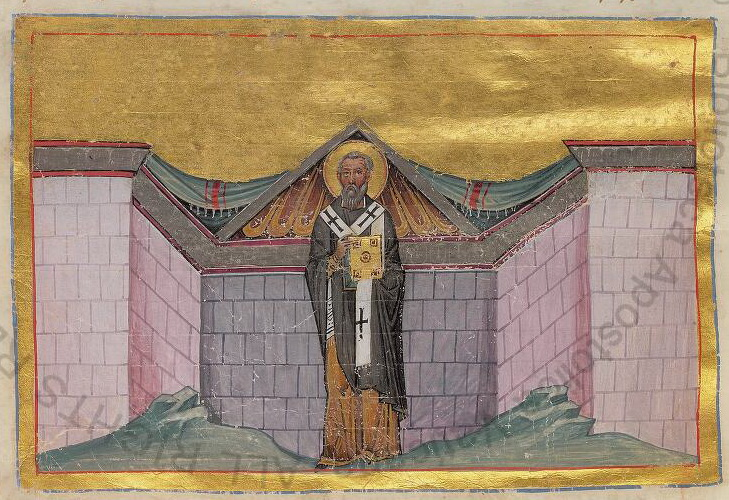
Saint Philogonius, Bishop of Antioch, Confessor.
(Menologion of Basil II, 10th century).

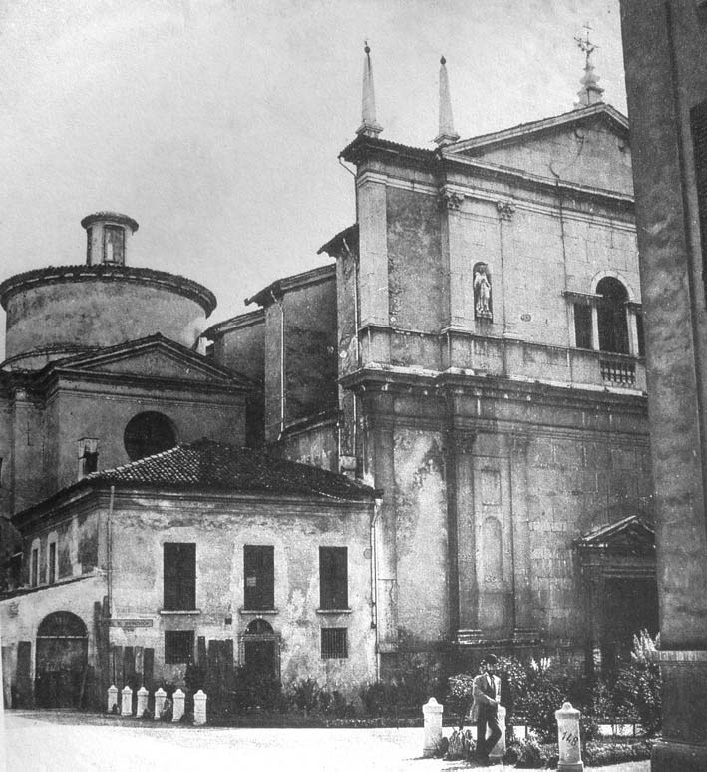
Church of Saint Dominic of Brescia, in Brescia (1883).

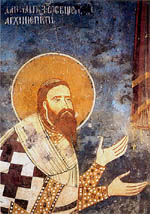
Saint Daniel II, Archbishop of Serbia (fresco from Patriarchate of Peć).

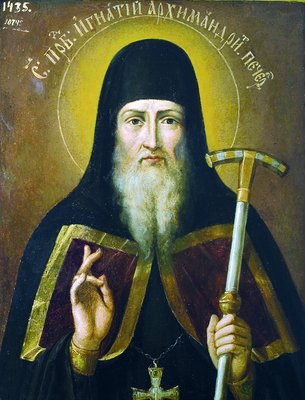
Venerable Ignatius, Archimandrite of the Kiev Caves.

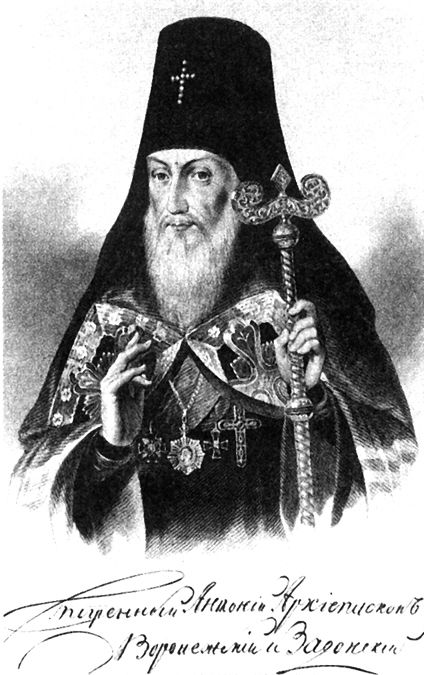
Saint Anthony (Smirnitsky), Archbishop of Voronezh.

St. John of Kronstadt.

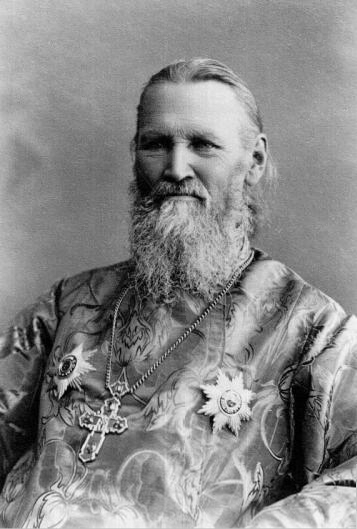
St. John of Kronstadt.

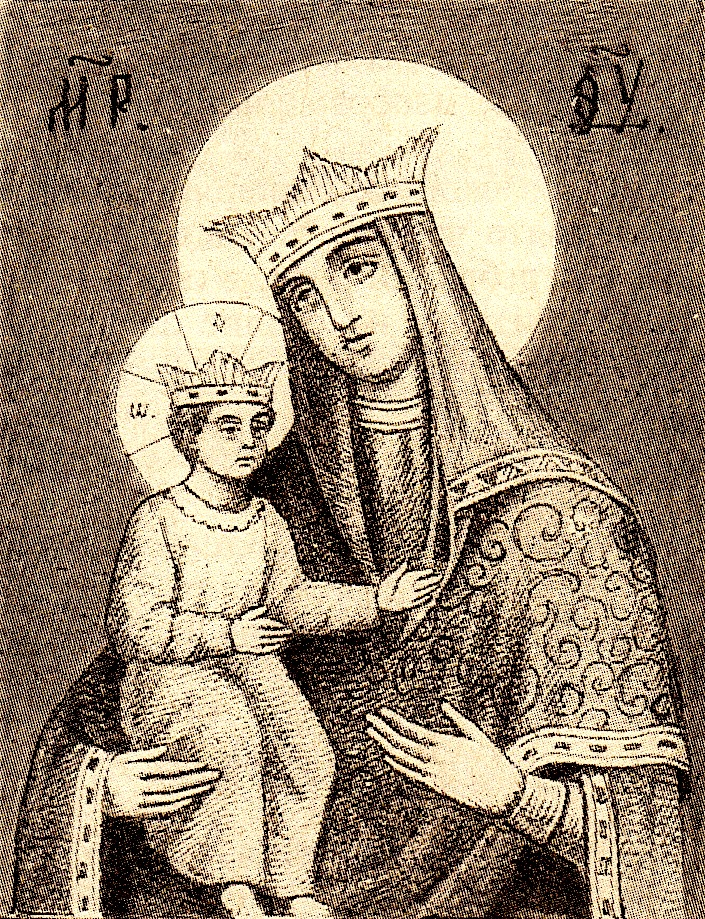
Icon of the Mother of God of Novgorod.

== Sources ==
- December 20/January 2. Orthodox Calendar (PRAVOSLAVIE.RU).
- January 2 / December 20. HOLY TRINITY RUSSIAN ORTHODOX CHURCH (A parish of the Patriarchate of Moscow).
- December 20. OCA - The Lives of the Saints.
- The Autonomous Orthodox Metropolia of Western Europe and the Americas (ROCOR). St. Hilarion Calendar of Saints for the year of our Lord 2004. St. Hilarion Press (Austin, TX). p. 1.
- December 20. Latin Saints of the Orthodox Patriarchate of Rome.
- The Roman Martyrology. Transl. by the Archbishop of Baltimore. Last Edition, According to the Copy Printed at Rome in 1914. Revised Edition, with the Imprimatur of His Eminence Cardinal Gibbons. Baltimore: John Murphy Company, 1916.

Greek Sources

- Great Synaxaristes: (in Greek) 20 ΔΕΚΕΜΒΡΙΟΥ. ΜΕΓΑΣ ΣΥΝΑΞΑΡΙΣΤΗΣ.
- (in Greek) Συναξαριστής. 20 Δεκεμβρίου. ECCLESIA.GR. (H ΕΚΚΛΗΣΙΑ ΤΗΣ ΕΛΛΑΔΟΣ).

Russian Sources

- (in Russian) 2 января (20 декабря). Православная Энциклопедия под редакцией Патриарха Московского и всея Руси Кирилла (электронная версия). (Orthodox Encyclopedia - Pravenc.ru).
- (in Russian) 20 декабря (ст.ст.) 2 января 2015 (нов. ст.). Русская Православная Церковь Отдел внешних церковных связей. (DECR).
