= Saint Gordius =

Christian soldier and martyr (died 320)

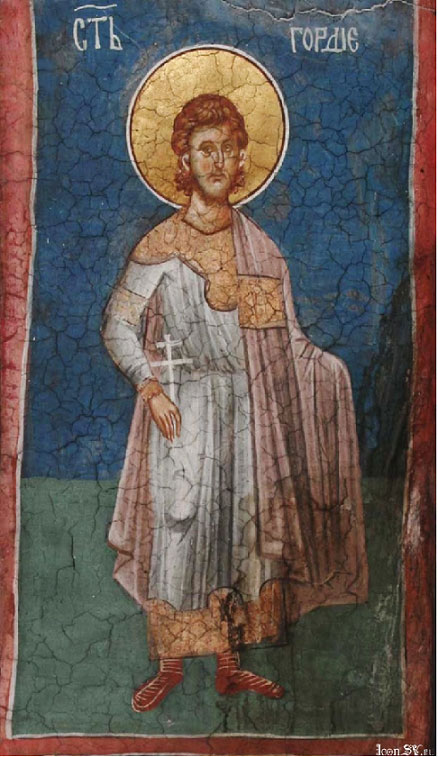
- Icon of St. Gordius in the Church of Christ Pantocrator, Visoki Dečani, Kosovo, Serbia, circa 1350

Martyr
- Born: c. 3rd century AD; Caesarea in Cappadocia, Roman Empire (modern-day Kayseri, Turkey)
- Died: c. 320 AD; Caesarea in Cappadocia, Roman Empire (modern-day Kayseri, Turkey)
- Venerated in: Eastern Orthodox Church; Roman Catholic Church
- Canonized: Pre-congregation
- Feast: 3 January
- Attributes: Martyr's cross

Saint Gordius (also known as Gordinus; born c. 2nd century AD - died c. 320 AD) was a Christian soldier in Cappadocia who was dismissed from the Roman army, lived as a hermit for a while, then returned and made an open declaration of his faith, for which he was martyred in the city of Caesarea Maritima. He is commemorated on 3 January in the Eastern Orthodox Church and Roman Catholic Church.

== Roman Martyrology ==
The Roman Martyrology as of 1916 for the Third Day of January says,

At Caesarea, in Cappadocia, St. Gordius, centurion, in whose praise is extant a celebrated discourse, delivered by St. Basil the Great on the day of his festival.

== Monks of Ramsgate account ==
The Monks of Ramsgate wrote in their Book of Saints (1921),

Gordius (St.) M. (Jan. 3)
(4th cent.) A Christian soldier of Caesarea in Cappadocia, who in the time of the Emperor Licinius, with other Christians, was dismissed from the army and thereupon retired into a solitude. Later, returning to the city, he, moved by his zeal in the cause of Christ, addressed the crowd, seeking to make converts. He was seized and, after trial, beheaded in some year between A.D. 314 and A.D. 320. An eloquent Panegyric preached by St Basil, in which he reminds his hearers that some among them had seen Saint Gordius die, has perpetuated his memory.

== Butler's account ==
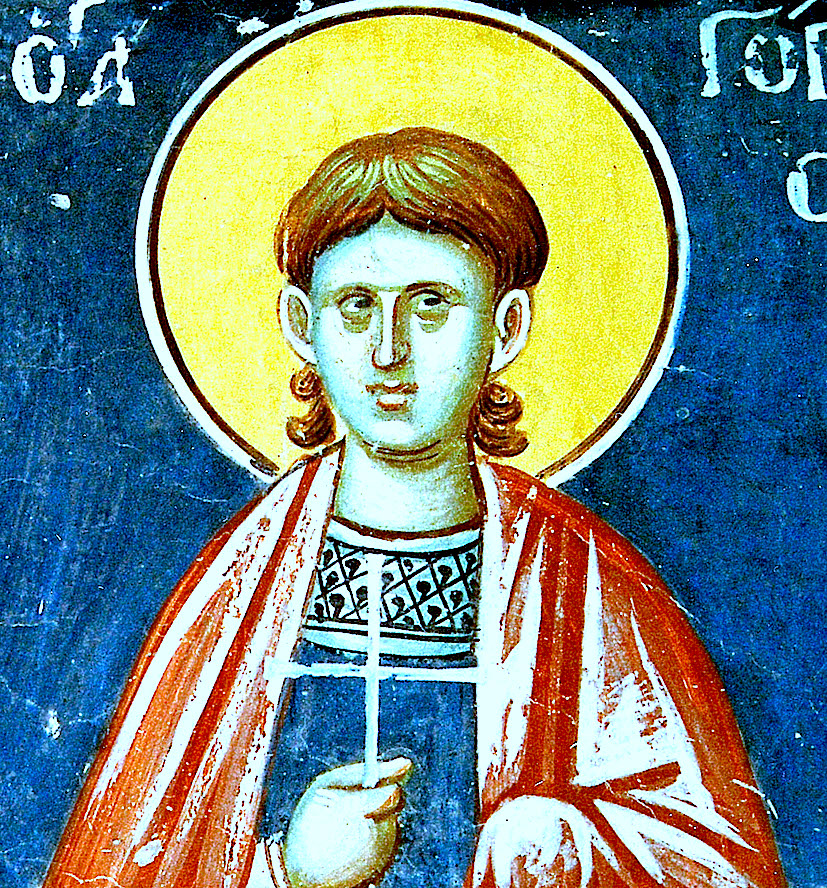
14th century fresco in the Church of St. George in Staro-Nogorichino.

The hagiographer Alban Butler (1710–1773) wrote in his Lives of the Fathers, Martyrs, and Other Principal Saints under January 3,

St. Gordius,

Martyred at Cæsarea, in Cappadocia, was a centurion in the army, but retired to the deserts when the persecution was first raised by Dioclesian. The desire of shedding his blood for Christ made him quit his solitude, whilst the people of that city were assembled in the Circus to solemnize public games in honour of Mars. His extenuated body, long beard and hair, and ragged clothes, drew on him the eyes of the whole assembly; yet, with this strange garb and mein, the graceful air of majesty that appeared in his countenance commanded veneration. Being examined by the governor, and loudly confessing his faith, he was condemned to be beheaded. Having fortified himself by the sign of the cross, he joyfully received the deadly blow. St. Basil, on this festival, pronounced his panegyric at Cæsarea, in which he says several of his audience had been eye-witnesses of the martyr’s triumph. Hom. 17. T. 1.

== Sources ==
- Butler, Alban (1868), The Lives of the Fathers, Martyrs, and Other Principal Saints, vol. 1, J. Duffy This article incorporates text from this source, which is in the public domain.
- Gibbons, James, ed. (1916), The Roman martyrology, Baltimore: John Murphy This article incorporates text from this source, which is in the public domain.
- St. Augustine's Abbey, Ramsgate (1921). The Book of saints : a dictionary of servants of God canonized by the Catholic Church. London: A. & C. Black, ltd. OCLC 671676136. This article incorporates text from this source, which is in the public domain.
