= Basil of Ancyra (martyr) =

Eastern Orthodox saint and martyr

Saint Basil of Ancyra
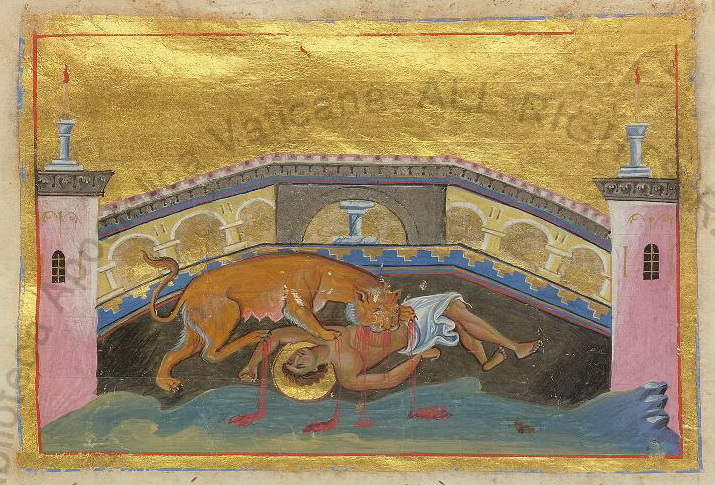
- Miniature from the Menologion of Basil II

Martyr
- Died: Between 331 and 362; Caesarea
- Cause of death: Eaten by lions
- Honored in: Eastern Orthodox Church
- Feast: 1 January

Basil of Ancyra was a Christian martyr who was killed during the reign of Julian the Apostate (331–362). He is not to be confused with the hieromartyr Basil of Ancyra, who was also martyred during the reign of Emperor Julian.

== Biography ==
Saint Basil was presumably a convert to Christianity. He was also a layman. He eventually professed his faith in Christ before the Roman governor Saturninius Secundus Salutius. After being tortured in Ancyra, he was sent to the capital city of Constantinople, where he endured further torment—being suspended from a tree, stretched on a rack, beaten, and pierced with red-hot needles. He was also thrown into a fiery furnace but miraculously emerged unharmed. Finally, he was sent to Caesarea, where he was devoured by lions in the arena, sharing the fate of many Christian martyrs of his era.

== Veneration ==
Saint Basil is venerated as a saint in the Eastern Orthodox Church on 1 January.
