= January 11 =

January 11 this year in various calendars
- Sunday, 11 January 2026
Akan	Fokwasi
Armenian	25 Arach 1475
Aztec	Toxcatl 1, 2 Ātl
Babylonian	21 Kislimu, 2336 SE
Balinese pawukon	Menga, Pasah, Sri, Pon, Tungleh, Redite of Tambir, Ludra, Urungan, Suka
Bengali	27 Poush, BS 1432
Chinese	Yin Wood Rooster・Room Mansion; Wood Snake Year, Month 11, Day 23 (Xiaohan, 9 days until Dahan)
Common Era	11 January 2026 CE
Coptic	3 Tobi, AM 1742
Egyptian	30 Pachon, 2774 NE
Ethiopian	3 Ṭer, 2018 Amätä Məhrät
French Republican	Décade III, Duodi de Nivôse de l'Année 234 de la République
Gregorian	11 January, AD 2026
Hebrew	22 Tevet, AM 5786
Hindu	Citrā・Sukarman; Solar: 27 Pauṣa, 1947 SE; Lunisolar: Aṣṭamī, Kṛishna pakṣa of Pauṣa, 2082 VE; Siddhārthin・5126 KY・1,872,586
Icelandic	Sunnudagur, 19 Mörsugur 2025
Islamic	22 Rajab, AH 1447 (using tabular method)
ISO week date	2026-W02-7
Japanese	23 Shimotsuki, Reiwa 8 (Shōkan, 9 days until Daikan)
Julian	29 December, AD 2025 (AM 7535)
Julian day	2461052
Korean	23 Jwidal, 4358 DE
Maya	13.0.13.4.9; 7 Muan, 2 Muluc
Roman	ante diem IV Kalendas Ianuarias, MMDCCLXXIX AUC
Solar Hijri	21 Dey, SH 1404
Tibetan	23 mgo, shing mo sbrul 2152 or 1771 or 999

<<	January					>>
Su	Mo	Tu	We	Th	Fr	Sa
				1	2	3
4	5	6	7	8	9	10
11	12	13	14	15	16	17
18	19	20	21	22	23	24
25	26	27	28	29	30	31
2026

January 11 in recent years
2026 (Sunday)
2025 (Saturday)
2024 (Thursday)
2023 (Wednesday)
2022 (Tuesday)
2021 (Monday)
2020 (Saturday)
2019 (Friday)
2018 (Thursday)
2017 (Wednesday)

January 11 is the 11th day of the year in the Gregorian calendar; 354 days remain until the end of the year (355 in leap years).

== Events ==
=== Pre-1600 ===
- 532 – Nika riots in Constantinople: A quarrel between supporters of different chariot teams—the Blues and the Greens—in the Hippodrome escalates into violence.
- 630 – Conquest of Mecca: Muhammad and his followers conquer the city, and the Quraysh association of clans surrenders.
- 930 – Sack of Mecca by the Qarmatians.
- 1055 – Theodora is crowned empress of the Byzantine Empire.
- 1158 – Vladislaus II, Duke of Bohemia becomes King of Bohemia.
- 1569 – First recorded lottery in England.

=== 1601–1900 ===
- 1654 – Arauco War: A Spanish army is defeated by local Mapuche-Huilliches as it tries to cross Bueno River in Southern Chile.
- 1759 – The first American life insurance company, the Corporation for Relief of Poor and Distressed Presbyterian Ministers and of the Poor and Distressed Widows and Children of the Presbyterian Ministers (now part of Unum Group), is incorporated in Philadelphia, Pennsylvania.
- 1787 – William Herschel discovers Titania and Oberon, two moons of Uranus.
- 1805 – The Michigan Territory is created.
- 1820 – The Great Savannah Fire of 1820 destroys over 400 buildings in Savannah, Georgia.
- 1851 – Taiping Rebellion: Hong Xiuquan proclaims the Taiping Heavenly Kingdom, starting the Jintian Uprising.
- 1861 – American Civil War: Alabama secedes from the United States.
- 1863 – American Civil War: The three-day Battle of Arkansas Post concludes as General John McClernand and Admiral David Dixon Porter capture Fort Hindman and secure control over the Arkansas River for the Union.
- 1863 – American Civil War: CSS Alabama encounters and sinks the USS Hatteras off Galveston Lighthouse in Texas.
- 1879 – The Anglo-Zulu War begins.

=== 1901–present ===
- 1908 – Grand Canyon National Monument is created.
- 1912 – Immigrant textile workers in Lawrence, Massachusetts, go on strike when wages are reduced in response to a mandated shortening of the work week.
- 1914 – The Karluk, flagship of the Canadian Arctic Expedition, sinks after being crushed by ice.
- 1917 – The Kingsland munitions factory explosion occurs, possibly as a result of German sabotage.
- 1922 – Leonard Thompson becomes the first person to be injected with insulin.
- 1923 – Occupation of the Ruhr: Troops from France and Belgium occupy the Ruhr area to force Germany to make its World War I reparation payments.
- 1927 – Louis B. Mayer, head of film studio Metro-Goldwyn-Mayer (MGM), announces the creation of the Academy of Motion Picture Arts and Sciences, at a banquet in Los Angeles, California.
- 1935 – Amelia Earhart becomes the first person to fly solo from Hawaii to California.
- 1942 – World War II: Japanese forces capture Kuala Lumpur, the capital of the Federated Malay States.
- 1942 – World War II: Japanese forces attack Tarakan in Borneo, Netherlands Indies (Battle of Tarakan)
- 1943 – The Republic of China agrees to the Sino-British New Equal Treaty and the Sino-American New Equal Treaty.
- 1943 – Italian-American anarchist Carlo Tresca is assassinated in New York City.
- 1946 – Enver Hoxha, Secretary General of the Communist Party of Albania, declares the People's Republic of Albania with himself as head of state.
- 1949 – The first "networked" television broadcasts took place as KDKA-TV in Pittsburgh, Pennsylvania goes on the air connecting the east coast and mid-west programming.
- 1957 – The African Convention is founded in Dakar, Senegal.
- 1959 – 36 people are killed when Lufthansa Flight 502 crashes on approach to Rio de Janeiro/Galeão International Airport in Brazil.
- 1961 – Throgs Neck Bridge over the East River, linking New York City's boroughs of The Bronx and Queens, opens to road traffic.
- 1962 – Cold War: While tied to its pier in Polyarny, the Soviet submarine B-37 is destroyed when fire breaks out in its torpedo compartment.
- 1962 – An avalanche on Huascarán in Peru causes around 4,000 deaths.
- 1964 – Surgeon General of the United States Dr. Luther Terry, M.D., publishes the landmark report Smoking and Health: Report of the Advisory Committee to the Surgeon General of the Public Health Service saying that smoking may be hazardous to health, sparking national and worldwide anti-smoking efforts.
- 1966 – The Tbilisi Metro is opened.
- 1972 – East Pakistan renames itself Bangladesh.
- 1973 – Major League Baseball owners vote in approval of the American League adopting the designated hitter position.
- 1977 – The first episode of Finnish children's TV show Pikku Kakkonen ("Little Number Two") is aired on Yle TV2.
- 1983 – United Airlines Flight 2885 crashes after takeoff from Detroit Metropolitan Airport, killing three.
- 1986 – The Gateway Bridge, Brisbane, Queensland, Australia is officially opened.
- 1994 – The Irish Government announces the end of a 15-year broadcasting ban on the IRA and its political arm Sinn Féin.
- 1995 – 51 people are killed in a plane crash in María La Baja, Colombia.
- 1996 – Space Shuttle program: STS-72 launches from the Kennedy Space Center marking the start of the 74th Space Shuttle mission and the 10th flight of Endeavour.
- 1998 – Over 100 people are killed in the Sidi-Hamed massacre in Algeria.
- 2003 – Illinois Governor George Ryan commutes the death sentences of 167 prisoners on Illinois's death row based on the Jon Burge scandal.
- 2013 – One French soldier and 17 militants are killed in a failed attempt to free a French hostage in Bulo Marer, Somalia.
- 2020 – COVID-19 pandemic in Hubei: Municipal health officials in Wuhan announce the first recorded death from COVID-19.

== Births ==
=== Pre-1600 ===
- 347 – Theodosius I, Roman emperor (died 395)
- 1113 – Wang Chongyang, Chinese religious leader and poet (died 1170)
- 1209 – Möngke Khan, Mongolian emperor (died 1259)
- 1322 – Emperor Kōmyō of Japan (died 1380)
- 1359 – Emperor Go-En'yū of Japan (died 1393)
- 1395 – Michele of Valois, daughter of Charles VI of France (died 1422)
- 1503 – Parmigianino, Italian artist (died 1540)
- 1589 – William Strode, English politician (died 1666)
- 1591 – Robert Devereux, 3rd Earl of Essex, English general and politician, Lord Lieutenant of Staffordshire (died 1646)

=== 1601–1900 ===
- 1624 – Bastiaan Govertsz van der Leeuw, Dutch painter (died 1680)
- 1630 – John Rogers, English-American minister, physician, and academic (died 1684)
- 1638 – Nicolas Steno, Danish bishop and anatomist (died 1686)
- 1642 – Johann Friedrich Alberti, German organist and composer (died 1710)
- 1650 – Diana Glauber, Dutch-German painter (died 1721)
- 1671 – François-Marie, 1st duc de Broglie, French general and diplomat (died 1745)
- 1755 – Alexander Hamilton, Nevisian-American general, economist and politician, 1st United States Secretary of the Treasury (died 1804)
- 1757 – Samuel Bentham, English engineer and architect (died 1831)
- 1760 – Oliver Wolcott Jr., American lawyer and politician, 2nd United States Secretary of the Treasury, 24th Governor of Connecticut (died 1833)
- 1777 – Vincenzo Borg, Maltese merchant and rebel leader (died 1837)
- 1786 – Joseph Jackson Lister, English physicist (died 1869)
- 1788 – William Thomas Brande, English chemist and academic (died 1866)
- 1800 – Ányos Jedlik, Hungarian physicist and engineer (died 1895)
- 1807 – Ezra Cornell, American businessman and philanthropist, founded Western Union and Cornell University (died 1874)
- 1814 – James Paget, English surgeon and pathologist (died 1899)
- 1814 – Socrates Nelson, American businessman and politician (died 1867)
- 1815 – John A. Macdonald, Scottish-Canadian lawyer and politician, 1st Prime Minister of Canada (died 1891)
- 1825 – Bayard Taylor, American poet, author, and critic (died 1878)
- 1839 – Eugenio María de Hostos, Puerto Rican lawyer, philosopher, and sociologist (died 1903)
- 1842 – William James, American psychologist and philosopher (died 1910)
- 1843 – Adolf Eberle, German painter (died 1914)
- 1845 – Albert Victor Bäcklund, Swedish mathematician and physicist (died 1912)
- 1850 – Joseph Charles Arthur, American pathologist and mycologist (died 1942)
- 1852 – Constantin Fehrenbach, German lawyer and politician, 4th Chancellor of Weimar Germany (died 1926)
- 1853 – Georgios Jakobides, Greek painter and sculptor (died 1932)
- 1856 – Christian Sinding, Norwegian pianist and composer (died 1941)
- 1857 – Fred Archer, English jockey (died 1886)
- 1858 – Harry Gordon Selfridge, American-English businessman, founded Selfridges (died 1947)
- 1859 – George Curzon, 1st Marquess Curzon of Kedleston, English politician, 35th Governor-General of India (died 1925)
- 1864 – Thomas Dixon, Jr., American minister, lawyer, and politician (died 1946)
- 1867 – John Ernest Adamson, English educationalist and Director of Education of the Colony of Transvaal (died 1950)
- 1867 – Edward B. Titchener, English psychologist and academic (died 1927)
- 1868 – Cai Yuanpei, Chinese philosopher, academic, and politician (died 1940)
- 1870 – Alexander Stirling Calder, American sculptor and educator (died 1945)
- 1872 – G. W. Pierce, American physicist and academic (died 1956)
- 1873 – John Callan O'Laughlin, American soldier and journalist (died 1949)
- 1874 – Alfonso Quiñónez Molina, Salvadoran politician, physician, and three-time president of El Salvador (died 1950)
- 1875 – Reinhold Glière, Russian composer and academic (died 1956)
- 1876 – Elmer Flick, American baseball player (died 1971)
- 1876 – Thomas Hicks, American runner (died 1952)
- 1878 – Theodoros Pangalos, Greek general and politician, President of Greece (died 1952)
- 1885 – Alice Paul, American activist and suffragist (died 1977)
- 1886 – George Zucco, British actor (died 1960)
- 1887 – Aldo Leopold, American ecologist and author (died 1948)
- 1888 – Joseph B. Keenan, American jurist and politician (died 1954)
- 1889 – Calvin Bridges, American geneticist and academic (died 1938)
- 1890 – Max Carey, American baseball player and manager (died 1976)
- 1890 – Oswald de Andrade, Brazilian poet and critic (died 1954)
- 1891 – Andrew Sockalexis, American runner (died 1919)
- 1893 – Ellinor Aiki, Estonian painter (died 1969)
- 1893 – Charles Fraser, Australian rugby league player and coach (died 1981)
- 1893 – Anthony M. Rud, American journalist and author (died 1942)
- 1895 – Laurens Hammond, American engineer and businessman, founded the Hammond Clock Company (died 1973)
- 1897 – Bernard DeVoto, American historian and author (died 1955)
- 1897 – August Heissmeyer, German SS officer (died 1979)
- 1899 – Eva Le Gallienne, English-American actress, director, and producer (died 1991)

=== 1901–present ===
- 1901 – Kwon Ki-ok, Korean pilot (died 1988)
- 1902 – Maurice Duruflé, French organist and composer (died 1986)
- 1903 – Alan Paton, South African author and activist (died 1988)
- 1905 – Clyde Kluckhohn, American anthropologist and theorist (died 1960)
- 1906 – Albert Hofmann, Swiss chemist and academic, discoverer of LSD (died 2008)
- 1907 – Pierre Mendès France, French lawyer and politician, 142nd Prime Minister of France (died 1982)
- 1907 – Abraham Joshua Heschel, Polish-American rabbi, theologian, and philosopher (died 1972)
- 1908 – Lionel Stander, American actor and activist (died 1994)
- 1910 – Arthur Lambourn, New Zealand rugby player (died 1999)
- 1910 – Shane Paltridge, Australian soldier and politician (died 1966)
- 1911 – Tommy Duncan, American singer-songwriter (died 1967)
- 1911 – Nora Heysen, Australian painter (died 2003)
- 1911 – Zenkō Suzuki, Japanese politician, 70th Prime Minister of Japan (died 2004)
- 1912 – Don "Red" Barry, American actor, producer, and screenwriter (died 1980)
- 1913 – Karl Stegger, Danish actor (died 1980)
- 1915 – Luise Krüger, German javelin thrower (died 2001)
- 1915 – Paddy Mayne, British colonel and lawyer (died 1955)
- 1916 – Bernard Blier, Argentinian-French actor (died 1989)
- 1917 – John Robarts, Canadian lawyer and politician, 17th Premier of Ontario (died 1982)
- 1918 – Robert C. O'Brien, American author and journalist (died 1973)
- 1918 – Spencer Walklate, Australian rugby league player and soldier (died 1945)
- 1920 – Mick McManus, English wrestler (died 2013)
- 1921 – Gory Guerrero, American wrestler and trainer (died 1990)
- 1921 – Juanita M. Kreps, American economist and politician, 24th United States Secretary of Commerce (died 2010)
- 1923 – Jerome Bixby, American author and screenwriter (died 1998)
- 1923 – Ernst Nolte, German historian and philosopher (died 2016)
- 1923 – Carroll Shelby, American race car driver, engineer, and businessman, founded Carroll Shelby International (died 2012)
- 1924 – Roger Guillemin, French-American physician and endocrinologist, Nobel Prize laureate (died 2024)
- 1924 – Sam B. Hall, Jr., American lawyer, judge, and politician (died 1994)
- 1924 – Slim Harpo, American blues singer-songwriter and musician (died 1970)
- 1925 – Grant Tinker, American television producer, co-founded MTM Enterprises (died 2016)
- 1926 – Lev Dyomin, Russian colonel, pilot, and astronaut (died 1998)
- 1928 – David L. Wolper, American director and producer (died 2010)
- 1929 – Dmitri Bruns, Estonian architect and theorist (died 2020)
- 1930 – Ron Mulock, Australian lawyer and politician, 10th Deputy Premier of New South Wales (died 2014)
- 1930 – Rod Taylor, Australian-American actor and screenwriter (died 2015)
- 1931 – Betty Churcher, Australian painter, historian, and curator (died 2015)
- 1931 – Mary Rodgers, American composer and author (died 2014)
- 1932 – Alfonso Arau, Mexican actor and director
- 1933 – Goldie Hill, American country singer-songwriter and guitarist (died 2005)
- 1934 – Jean Chrétien, Canadian lawyer and politician, 20th Prime Minister of Canada
- 1934 – Mitchell Ryan, American actor (died 2022)
- 1936 – Eva Hesse, German-American sculptor and educator (died 1970)
- 1937 – Felix Silla, Italian character actor, circus performer, voice artist, and stuntman (died 2021)
- 1938 – Arthur Scargill, English miner, activist, and politician
- 1939 – Anne Heggtveit, Canadian alpine skier
- 1940 – Andres Tarand, Estonian geographer and politician, 10th Prime Minister of Estonia
- 1941 – Abdullah the Butcher, Canadian professional wrestler
- 1941 – Gérson, Brazilian footballer
- 1942 – Bud Acton, American basketball player
- 1942 – Clarence Clemons, American saxophonist and actor (died 2011)
- 1944 – Mohammed Abdul-Hayy, Sudanese poet and academic (died 1989)
- 1944 – Shibu Soren, Indian politician, 3rd Chief Minister of Jharkhand (died 2025)
- 1945 – Christine Kaufmann, German actress, author, and businesswoman (died 2017)
- 1946 – Naomi Judd, American singer-songwriter and actress (died 2022)
- 1946 – Tony Kaye, English progressive rock keyboard player and songwriter
- 1946 – John Piper, American theologian and author
- 1947 – Hamish Macdonald, New Zealand rugby player
- 1948 – Fritz Bohla, German footballer and manager
- 1948 – Joe Harper, Scottish footballer and manager
- 1948 – Wajima Hiroshi, Japanese sumo wrestler, the 54th Yokozuna (died 2018)
- 1948 – Madeline Manning, American runner and coach
- 1948 – Terry Williams, Welsh drummer
- 1949 – Daryl Braithwaite, Australian singer-songwriter
- 1949 – Chris Ford, American basketball player and coach (died 2023)
- 1949 – Mohammad Reza Rahimi, Iranian lawyer and politician, 2nd Vice President of Iran
- 1951 – Charlie Huhn, American rock singer and guitarist
- 1951 – Willie Maddren, English footballer and manager (died 2000)
- 1951 – Philip Tartaglia, Scottish archbishop (died 2021)
- 1952 – Bille Brown, Australian actor and playwright (died 2013)
- 1952 – Ben Crenshaw, American golfer and architect
- 1952 – Michael Forshaw, Australian lawyer and politician
- 1952 – Diana Gabaldon, American author
- 1952 – Lee Ritenour, American guitarist, composer, and producer
- 1953 – Graham Allen, English politician, Vice-Chamberlain of the Household
- 1953 – Kostas Skandalidis, Greek engineer and politician, Greek Minister of Agricultural Development and Food
- 1954 – Jaak Aaviksoo, Estonian physicist and politician, 26th Estonian Minister of Defence
- 1954 – Kailash Satyarthi, Indian engineer, academic, and activist, Nobel Prize laureate
- 1956 – David Grant, Australian rugby league player (died 1994)
- 1956 – Big Bank Hank, American rapper (died 2014)
- 1956 – Robert Earl Keen, American singer-songwriter
- 1956 – Phyllis Logan, Scottish actress
- 1957 – Darryl Dawkins, American basketball player and coach (died 2015)
- 1957 – Peter Moore, Australian rules footballer and coach
- 1957 – Bryan Robson, English footballer and manager
- 1958 – Vicki Peterson, American singer-songwriter and guitarist
- 1959 – Brett Bodine, American NASCAR driver
- 1961 – Jasper Fforde, English author
- 1961 – Lars-Erik Torph, Swedish racing driver (died 1989)
- 1961 – Karl von Habsburg, Austrian politician, Head of the House of Habsburg-Lorraine
- 1962 – Chris Bryant, Welsh politician, Minister of State for Europe
- 1962 – Kim Coles, American actress and comedian
- 1963 – Tracy Caulkins, American-Australian swimmer
- 1963 – Jason Connery, Italian-born British actor and director
- 1963 – Petra Schneider, German swimmer
- 1964 – Albert Dupontel, French actor and director
- 1965 – Mascarita Sagrada, Mexican wrestler
- 1965 – Aleksey Zhukov, Russian footballer and coach
- 1968 – Anders Borg, Swedish economist and politician, Swedish Minister for Finance
- 1968 – Tom Dumont, American guitarist and producer
- 1968 – Steve Mavin, Australian rugby league player
- 1969 – Manny Acta, Dominican-American baseball player, coach, manager, and sportscaster
- 1970 – Manfredi Beninati, Italian painter and sculptor
- 1970 – Malcolm D. Lee, American director, producer, screenwriter, and actor
- 1971 – Mary J. Blige, American singer-songwriter, producer, and actress
- 1971 – Jeff Orford, Australian rugby league player
- 1972 Amanda Peet, American actress and playwright
- 1973 – Rahul Dravid, Indian cricketer
- 1973 – Rockmond Dunbar, American actor
- 1974 – Roman Görtz, German footballer
- 1974 – Jens Nowotny, German footballer
- 1975 – Dan Luger, English rugby player and coach
- 1975 – Matteo Renzi, Italian politician, 56th Prime Minister of Italy
- 1976 – Efthimios Rentzias, Greek basketball player
- 1977 – Anni Friesinger-Postma, German speed skater
- 1977 – Shane Kelly, Australian rugby league player
- 1977 – Olexiy Lukashevych, Ukrainian long jumper
- 1978 – Vallo Allingu, Estonian basketball player
- 1978 – Holly Brisley, Australian actress
- 1978 – Michael Duff, Irish footballer
- 1978 – Emile Heskey, English footballer
- 1979 – Darren Lynn Bousman, American director and screenwriter
- 1979 – Michael Lorenz, German footballer
- 1979 – Terence Morris, American basketball player
- 1979 – Siti Nurhaliza, Malaysian singer-songwriter and businesswoman
- 1980 – Josh Hannay, Australian rugby league player and coach
- 1980 – Damien Wilkins, American basketball player
- 1982 – Tony Allen, American basketball player
- 1982 – Clint Greenshields, Australian-French rugby league player
- 1982 – Son Ye-jin, South Korean actress
- 1983 – André Myhrer, Swedish skier
- 1983 – Ted Richards, Australian rules footballer
- 1983 – Adrian Sutil, German racing driver
- 1984 – Kevin Boss, American football player
- 1984 – Dario Krešić, Croatian footballer
- 1984 – Matt Mullenweg, American web developer and businessman, co-created WordPress
- 1984 – Stijn Schaars, Dutch footballer
- 1984 – Glenn Stewart, Australian rugby league player
- 1985 – Dennis Dixon, American football player
- 1985 – Newton Faulkner, English singer-songwriter and guitarist
- 1985 – Aja Naomi King, American actress
- 1987 – Scotty Cranmer, American BMX rider
- 1987 – Danuta Kozák, Hungarian sprint canoer
- 1987 – Daniel Semenzato, Italian footballer
- 1987 – Jamie Vardy, English footballer
- 1987 – Kim Young-kwang, South Korean actor and model
- 1988 – Epiphanny Prince, American-Russian basketball player
- 1989 – Demario Davis, American football player
- 1990 – Malik Jackson, American football player
- 1991 – Andrea Bertolacci, Italian footballer
- 1992 – Dani Carvajal, Spanish footballer
- 1992 – Lee Seung-hoon, South Korean rapper and dancer
- 1993 – Chris Boucher, Saint Lucian-Canadian basketball player
- 1993 – Park Junghwan, South Korean Go player
- 1993 – Michael Keane, English footballer
- 1993 – Will Keane, Irish footballer
- 1995 – Nick Solak, American baseball player
- 1996 – Leroy Sané, German footballer
- 1997 – Cody Simpson, Australian singer-songwriter, guitarist, and actor
- 1998 – Thomas Mikaele, New Zealand rugby league player
- 1999 – Jeanette Hegg Duestad, Norwegian sport shooter
- 1999 – Lim Sung-jin, South Korean volleyball player
- 1999 – Brandon Wakeham, Australian-Fijian rugby league player
- 2000 – Lee Chae-yeon, South Korean singer-songwriter
- 2002 – Elly De La Cruz, Dominican baseball player

== Deaths ==
=== Pre-1600 ===
- 140 – Pope Hyginus, Bishop of Rome (born 74)
- 705 – Pope John VI (born 655)
- 782 – Emperor Kōnin of Japan (born 709)
- 812 – Staurakios, Byzantine emperor
- 844 – Michael I Rangabe, Byzantine emperor (born 770)
- 887 – Boso of Provence, Frankish nobleman
- 937 – Cao, empress of Later Tang
- 937 – Li Chongmei, prince of Later Tang
- 937 – Li Congke, emperor of Later Tang (born 885)
- 937 – Liu, empress of Later Tang
- 1055 – Constantine IX Monomachos, Byzantine emperor (born 1000)
- 1068 – Egbert I, Margrave of Meissen
- 1083 – Otto of Nordheim (born 1020)
- 1266 – Swietopelk II, Duke of Pomerania
- 1344 – Thomas Charlton, Bishop of Hereford and Lord Chancellor of Ireland
- 1372 – Eleanor of Lancaster, English noblewoman (born 1318)
- 1396 – Isidore Glabas, Metropolitan bishop of Thessalonica (born c. 1341)
- 1397 – Skirgaila, Grand Duke of Lithuania
- 1494 – Domenico Ghirlandaio, Italian painter (born 1449)
- 1495 – Pedro González de Mendoza, Spanish cardinal (born 1428)
- 1546 – Gaudenzio Ferrari, Italian painter and sculptor (born c. 1471)
- 1554 – Min Bin, king of Arakan (born 1493)

=== 1601–1900 ===
- 1641 – Juan Martínez de Jáuregui y Aguilar, Spanish poet and painter (born 1583)
- 1696 – Charles Albanel, French priest, missionary, and explorer (born 1616)
- 1703 – Johann Georg Graevius, German scholar and critic (born 1632)
- 1713 – Pierre Jurieu, French priest and theologian (born 1637)
- 1735 – Danilo I, Metropolitan of Cetinje (born 1670)
- 1753 – Hans Sloane, Irish-English physician and academic (born 1660)
- 1757 – Louis Bertrand Castel, French mathematician and philosopher (born 1688)
- 1762 – Louis-François Roubiliac, French-English sculptor (born 1695)
- 1763 – Caspar Abel, German poet, historian, and theologian (born 1676)
- 1771 – Jean-Baptiste de Boyer, Marquis d'Argens, French philosopher and author (born 1704)
- 1788 – François Joseph Paul de Grasse, French admiral (born 1722)
- 1791 – William Williams Pantycelyn, Welsh composer and poet (born 1717)
- 1798 – Heraclius II of Georgia (born 1720)
- 1801 – Domenico Cimarosa, Italian composer and educator (born 1749)
- 1824 – Thomas Mullins, 1st Baron Ventry, Anglo-Irish politician and peer (born 1736)
- 1836 – John Molson, Canadian businessman, founded the Molson Brewing Company (born 1763)
- 1843 – Francis Scott Key, American lawyer, author, and songwriter (born 1779)
- 1866 – Gustavus Vaughan Brooke, Irish actor (born 1818)
- 1866 – John Woolley, English minister and academic (born 1816)
- 1867 – Stuart Donaldson, English-Australian businessman and politician, 1st Premier of New South Wales (born 1812)
- 1882 – Theodor Schwann, German physiologist and biologist (born 1810)
- 1891 – Georges-Eugène Haussmann, French urban planner (born 1809)

=== 1901–present ===
- 1902 – Johnny Briggs, English cricketer and rugby player (born 1862)
- 1904 – William Sawyer, Canadian merchant and politician (born 1815)
- 1914 – Carl Jacobsen, Danish brewer and philanthropist (born 1842)
- 1920 – Steinar Schjøtt, Norwegian philologist and lexicographer (born 1844)
- 1923 – Constantine I of Greece (born 1868)
- 1928 – Thomas Hardy, English novelist and poet (born 1840)
- 1929 – Elfrida Andrée, Swedish organist, composer, and conductor (born 1841)
- 1931 – James Milton Carroll, American pastor, historian, and author (born 1852)
- 1937 – Nuri Conker, Turkish colonel and politician (born 1882)
- 1941 – Emanuel Lasker, German mathematician, philosopher, and chess player (born 1868)
- 1944 – Galeazzo Ciano, Italian politician, Italian Minister of Foreign Affairs (born 1903)
- 1947 – Eva Tanguay, Canadian singer (born 1879)
- 1952 – Jean de Lattre de Tassigny, French general (born 1889)
- 1952 – Aureliano Pertile, Italian tenor and educator (born 1885)
- 1953 – Noe Zhordania, Georgian journalist and politician, Prime Minister of Georgia (born 1868)
- 1953 – Roberta Fulbright, American businesswoman (born 1874)
- 1954 – Oscar Straus, Austrian composer (born 1870)
- 1957 – Robert Garran, Australian lawyer and politician, Solicitor-General of Australia (born 1867)
- 1961 – Elena Gerhardt, German soprano and actress (born 1883)
- 1963 – Arthur Nock, English-American scholar, theologian, and academic (born 1902)
- 1965 – Wally Pipp, American baseball player (born 1893)
- 1966 – Alberto Giacometti, Swiss sculptor and painter (born 1901)
- 1966 – Lal Bahadur Shastri, Indian academic and politician, 2nd Prime Minister of India (born 1904)
- 1968 – Moshe Zvi Segal, Israeli linguist and scholar (born 1876)
- 1969 – Richmal Crompton, English author and educator (born 1890)
- 1972 – Padraic Colum, Irish poet and playwright (born 1881)
- 1975 – Max Lorenz, German tenor and actor (born 1901)
- 1980 – Barbara Pym, English author (born 1913)
- 1981 – Beulah Bondi, American actress (born 1889)
- 1985 – Edward Buzzell, American actor, director, and screenwriter (born 1895)
- 1985 – William McKell, Australian lawyer and politician, 12th Governor-General of Australia (born 1891)
- 1986 – Sid Chaplin, English author and screenwriter (born 1916)
- 1986 – Andrzej Czok, Polish mountaineer (born 1948)
- 1987 – Albert Ferber, Swiss-English pianist, composer, and conductor (born 1911)
- 1988 – Pappy Boyington, American colonel and pilot, Medal of Honor recipient (born 1912)
- 1988 – Isidor Isaac Rabi, Polish-American physicist and academic, Nobel Prize laureate (born 1898)
- 1989 – Ray Moore, English radio host (born 1942)
- 1990 – Carolyn Haywood, American author and illustrator (born 1898)
- 1991 – Carl David Anderson, American physicist and academic, Nobel Prize laureate (born 1905)
- 1994 – Helmut Poppendick, German physician (born 1902)
- 1995 – Josef Gingold, Belarusian-American violinist and educator (born 1909)
- 1995 – Onat Kutlar, Turkish author and poet (born 1936)
- 1995 – Lewis Nixon, U.S. Army captain (born 1918)
- 1995 – Theodor Wisch, German general (born 1907)
- 1996 – Roger Crozier, Canadian-American ice hockey player (born 1942)
- 1999 – Fabrizio De André, Italian singer-songwriter and guitarist (born 1940)
- 1999 – Naomi Mitchison, Scottish author and poet (born 1897)
- 1999 – Brian Moore, Irish-Canadian author and screenwriter (born 1921)
- 2000 – Ivan Combe, American businessman, invented Clearasil (born 1911)
- 2000 – Bob Lemon, American baseball player and manager (born 1920)
- 2000 – Betty Archdale, English-Australian cricketer and educator (born 1907)
- 2001 – Denys Lasdun, English architect, co-designed the Royal National Theatre (born 1914)
- 2002 – Henri Verneuil, French-Armenian director and playwright (born 1920)
- 2003 – Jože Pučnik, Slovenian sociologist and politician (born 1932)
- 2004 – Spalding Gray, American actor, writer, and performance artist (born 1941)
- 2007 – Solveig Dommartin, French-German actress (born 1961)
- 2007 – Robert Anton Wilson, American psychologist, author, poet, and playwright (born 1932)
- 2008 – Edmund Hillary, New Zealand mountaineer and explorer (born 1919)
- 2008 – Carl Karcher, American businessman, co-founded Carl's Jr. (born 1917)
- 2010 – Miep Gies, Austrian-Dutch humanitarian (born 1909)
- 2010 – Éric Rohmer, French director, screenwriter, and critic (born 1920)
- 2011 – David Nelson, American actor, director, and producer (born 1936)
- 2012 – Mostafa Ahmadi-Roshan, Iranian physicist and academic (born 1980)
- 2012 – Gilles Jacquier, French journalist and photographer (born 1968)
- 2012 – Edgar Kaiser, Jr, American-Canadian businessman and philanthropist (born 1942)
- 2012 – Wally Osterkorn, American basketball player (born 1928)
- 2012 – Steven Rawlings, English astrophysicist, astronomer, and academic (born 1961)
- 2012 – David Whitaker, English composer and conductor (born 1931)
- 2013 – Guido Forti, Italian businessman, founded the Forti Racing Team (born 1940)
- 2013 – Nguyễn Khánh, Vietnamese general and politician, 3rd President of South Vietnam (born 1927)
- 2013 – Mariangela Melato, Italian actress (born 1941)
- 2013 – Tom Parry Jones, Welsh chemist, invented the breathalyzer (born 1935)
- 2013 – Alemayehu Shumye, Ethiopian runner (born 1988)
- 2013 – Aaron Swartz, American programmer and activist (born 1986)
- 2014 – Keiko Awaji, Japanese actress (born 1933)
- 2014 – Muhammad Habibur Rahman, Indian-Bangladeshi jurist and politician, Prime Minister of Bangladesh (born 1928)
- 2014 – Chai Trong-rong, Taiwanese educator and politician (born 1935)
- 2014 – Ariel Sharon, Israeli general and politician, 11th Prime Minister of Israel (born 1928)
- 2015 – Jenő Buzánszky, Hungarian footballer and coach (born 1925)
- 2015 – Anita Ekberg, Swedish-Italian model and actress (born 1931)
- 2015 – Chashi Nazrul Islam, Bangladeshi director and producer (born 1941)
- 2015 – Vernon Benjamin Mountcastle, American neuroscientist and academic (born 1918)
- 2016 – Monte Irvin, American baseball player (born 1919)
- 2016 – David Margulies, American actor (born 1937)
- 2017 – Adenan Satem, Malaysian politician and Chief Minister of Sarawak, Malaysia (born 1944)
- 2018 – Edgar Ray Killen, American murderer (born 1925)
- 2019 – Michael Atiyah, British-Lebanese mathematician (born 1929)
- 2023 – Carole Cook, American actress and singer (born 1924)
- 2026 – Richard Codey, American politician, 53rd Governor of New Jersey (born 1946)

== Holidays and observances ==
- Children's Day (Tunisia)
- Christian feast day:
  - Anastasius of Suppentonia (Roman Catholic)
  - Leucius of Brindisi (Roman Catholic)
  - Paulinus II of Aquileia
  - Pope Hyginus
  - Theodosius the Cenobiarch
  - Thomas of Cori
  - Vitalis of Gaza (Roman Catholic)
  - January 11 (Eastern Orthodox liturgics)
- Eugenio María de Hostos Day (Puerto Rico)
- Independence Resistance Day (Morocco)
- Kagami biraki (Japan)
- National Human Trafficking Awareness Day (United States)
- Republic Day (Albania)
- Carmentalia (January 11th and January 15th) (Rome)
- Prithvi Jayanti (Nepal)
