= April 22 (Eastern Orthodox liturgics) =

Day in the Eastern Orthodox liturgical calendar

Eastern Orthodox liturgical calendar
April 21	April 22	April 23
April 22 O.S. ≍ May 5 N.S. April 22 N.S ≍ April 9 O.S.

An Eastern Orthodox cross

April 22 in Eastern Orthodox liturgical calendars is a feast day and a day of commemoration of saints and martyrs. Although some Orthodox churches use the Revised Julian Calendar and others use the traditional Julian calendar, the fixed commemorations for their respective April 22 are broadly the same, no matter which calendar is used. (Note: Despite the dates being the same, the days to which they refer typically differ by 13 days. The notation Old Style or O.S. is sometimes used to indicate a date in the traditional Julian Calendar (the "Old Calendar"). The notation New Style or N.S. indicates a date in the Revised Julian calendar (the "New Calendar").)

== Saints ==
- Holy Apostle Nathaniel of the Twelve (Bartholomew) (1st century)
- Apostles Apelles, Luke (not the Evangelist), (Note: "At Smyrna, the Saints Apelles and Lucius, who were among the first disciples of Christ.") and Clement, (Note: Saint Clement - Nov 23 (In the East: Jan 4, Apr 22, Sept 10 and Nov 25). One of the Seventy Apostles, he was the third Pope of Rome. Consecrated by the Apostle Peter, he is mentioned in Philippians 4,3 and wrote a letter to the Church of Corinth which still exists. He is venerated as a martyr and he is remembered in Rome by the church of San Clemente, which may have been built on the site of his home.) of the Seventy (1st century)
- Martyr Leonides of Alexandria, Bishop (202)
- Martyr Nearchus, by fire (3rd century)
- Venerable Theodore the Sykeote, Bishop of Anastasiopolis in Galatia (613) (Note: "At Anastasiopolis, St. Theodore, a bishop renowned for miracles.") (see also: June 15 - Translation; June 16 - Uncovering)
- Saint Vitalis of Gaza, monk of the monastery of Abba Seridus at Gaza (609-620) (see also: January 11)

== Pre-Schism Western saints ==
- Hieromartyr Soter, Pope of Rome (c. 174) (Note: Like most Orthodox in Rome at this time, he was a Greek. He became Pope and corresponded with the Church of Corinth and traditionally he is regarded as a martyr.)
- Martyrs Epipodius of Lyons, by beheading (c. 177) (Note: "At Lyons, in the persecution of Antoninus Verus, St. Epipodius, who was arrested with Alexander (April 24), his companion, and after undergoing severe torments, consummated his martyrdom, by decapitation.")
- Saint Gaius, born in Dalmatia, became Pope of Rome, martyred with members of his family (296) (see also: August 11)
- Saint Agapitus I, Pope of Rome (536) (see also: April 17 - East)
- Saint Leo of Sens, Bishop of Sens in France for twenty-three years (541)
- The Two Brothers Arwald, sons of Arwald, the last Jutish King of the Isle of Wight, put to death by soldiers of King Ceadwalla, then a pagan, on the day after their baptism (686) (Note: "Ceadwalla, prince of Wessex, being himself as yet unbaptised, conquered the Isle of Wight, and meditated the entire extirpation of the pagan inhabitants. The two sons of Arwald, the ruler of the island, were sent for refuge to the mainland, but were betrayed, and ordered by Ceadwalla to be immediately put to death. The Abbot Cynibert of Hreutford, or Redbridge, hearing of this, hastened to the conqueror, to beg that, if they must needs die, he might at least be allowed to instruct and baptise them. This petition was granted, and the holy man instructed them, and fortified them with the holy Sacraments.")
- Saint Opportuna of Montreuil, sister of St Chrodegang, Bishop of Séez, Abbess at the convent of Monteuil (c. 770) (Note: She was described as 'a true mother to all her nuns'.)
- Saint Senorina, a Galician abbess who served as the abbess of the Benedictine convent of St John of Venaria (Vieyra) (982)

== Post-Schism Orthodox saints ==
- Saint Ananias of Malles, first monk, renovator and Abbot of the Holy Monastery of Panagia Exakousti in the village of Malles in Ierapetra, Crete (1907)
- Saint Ekaterina (Malkov-Panina), fool-for-Christ, of the Holy Dormition Pukhtitsa Convent in Estonia (1968) (Note: St. Ekaterina (Malkov-Panina) was born on May 15, 1889 in Finland in a family with six children. The future saint was distinguished by kindness and tenderness from an early age, and she loved to visit their local monastery. She moved to Estonia in 1919 with her family and on July 5, 1922 was accepted as a nun of Pukhtitsa Monastery. She was tonsured as a nun of the monastery in 1966. On May 5, 1968, on the Sunday of the Holy Myrrhbearers, Mother Ekaterina peacefully reposed in the Lord. There are numerous known cases of miracles and healings by her prayers, both during and after hear earthly life.)

=== New martyrs and confessors ===
- New Hieromartyr Eustathius Malahovsky, Priest (1918) (Note: See also: (in Russian) Малаховский, Евстафий Владимирович. Википедии. (Russian Wikipedia).)
- New Hieromartyr Platon of Banja Luka (Platon Jovanovic), Bishop of Banja Luka (1941) (see also: May 5)
- Martyr Demetrius Vlasenkov (1942)
- New Confessor Athanasius Andreyevich Saiko of Orel, Fool-for-Christ (1967) (Note: "St. Athanasy, a fool for Christ, endured repeated arrests, imprisonment in concentration camps, and over 18 years in psychiatric hospitals for his faith and religious activities under Soviet persecution, while continuing to minister to believers throughout his suffering. His feast day is set as April 22/May 5, the day of his repose.")

== Other commemorations ==
- Translation of the relics (1834) of St. Vsevolod (in holy baptism Gabriel), Prince and Wonderworker of Pskov (1138)

== Icon gallery ==
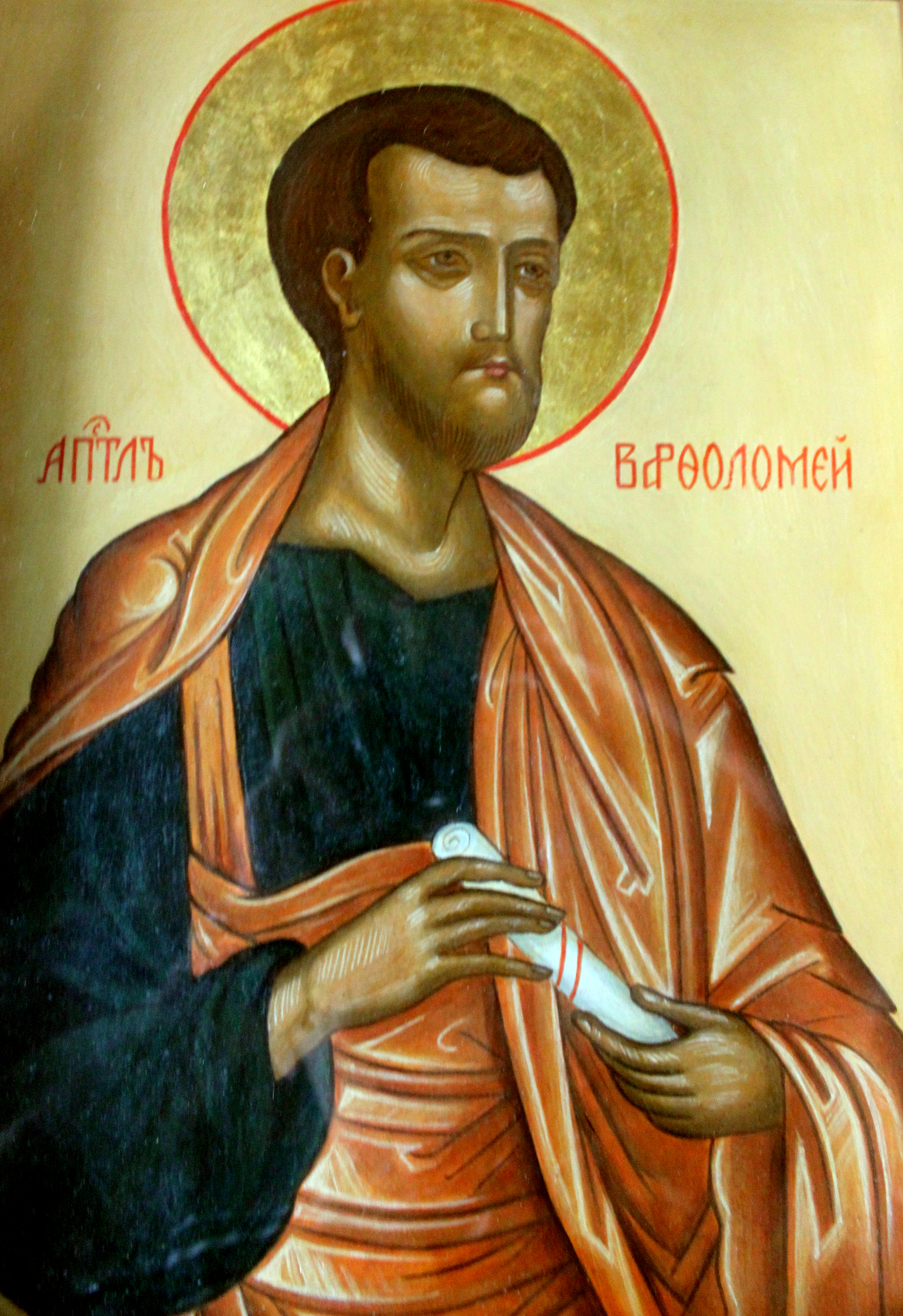
Holy Apostle Nathaniel of the Twelve (Bartholomew).

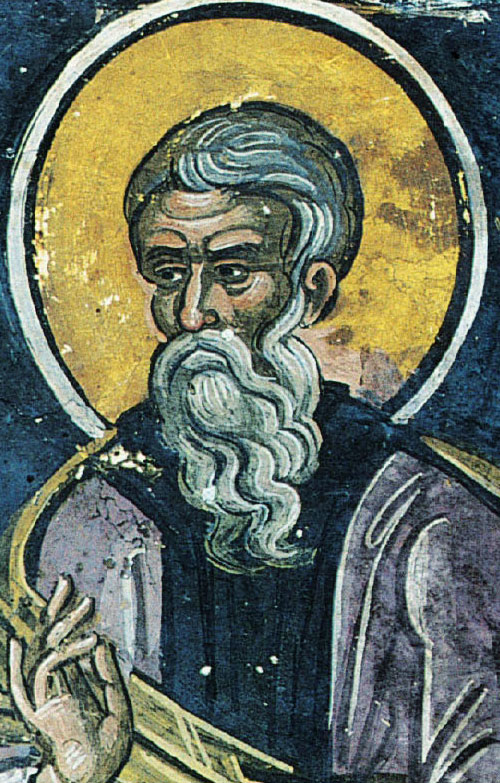
Venerable Theodore the Sykeote, Bishop of Anastasiopolis in Galatia.

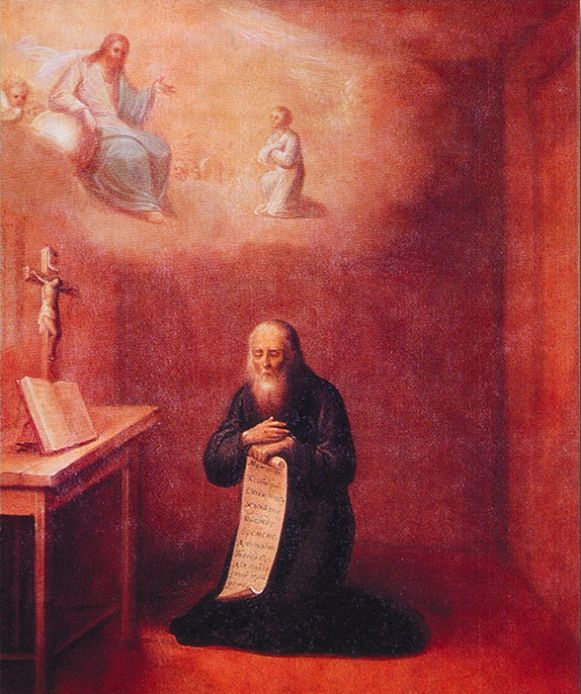
Saint Vitalis of Gaza, monk of the monastery of Abba Seridus at Gaza.

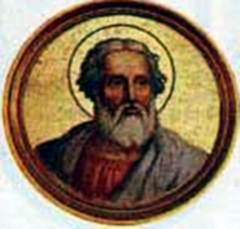
Hieromartyr Soter, Pope of Rome.

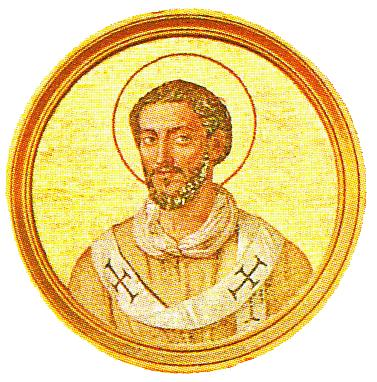
Pope Saint Gaius.

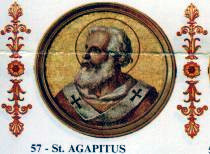
Agapitus I, Pope of Rome.

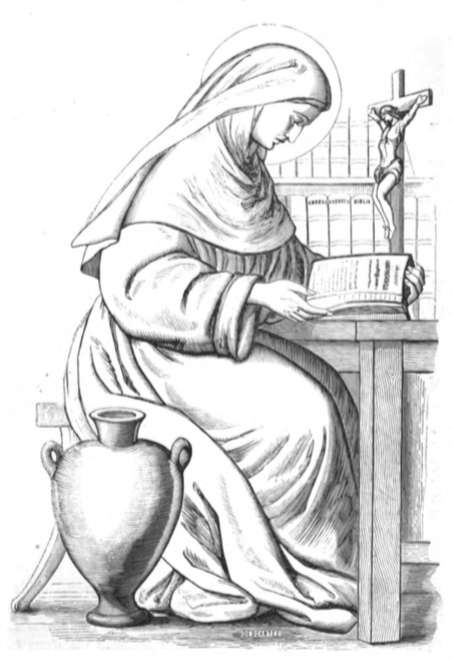
St. Senorina of Basto.

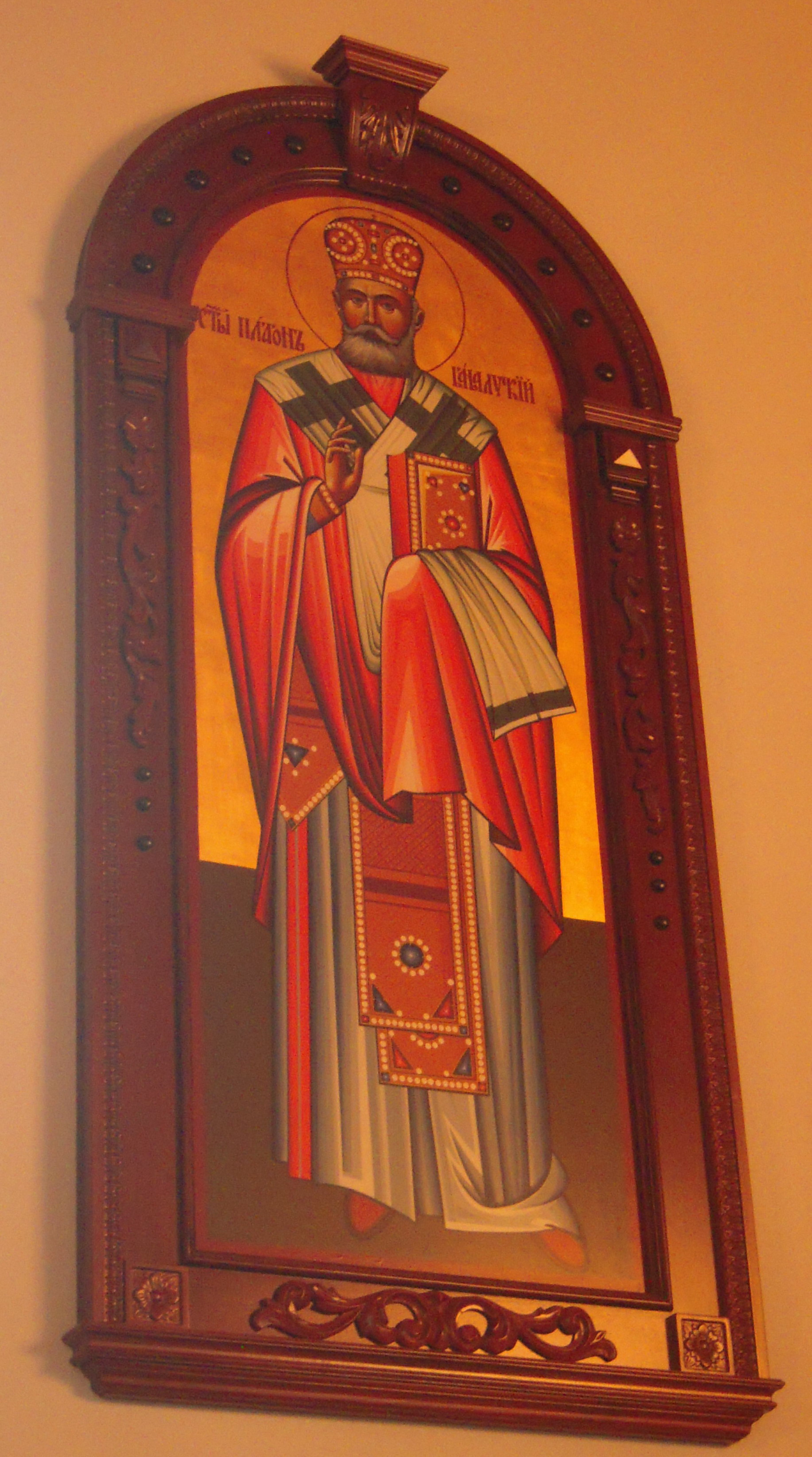
St. Platon of Banja Luka.

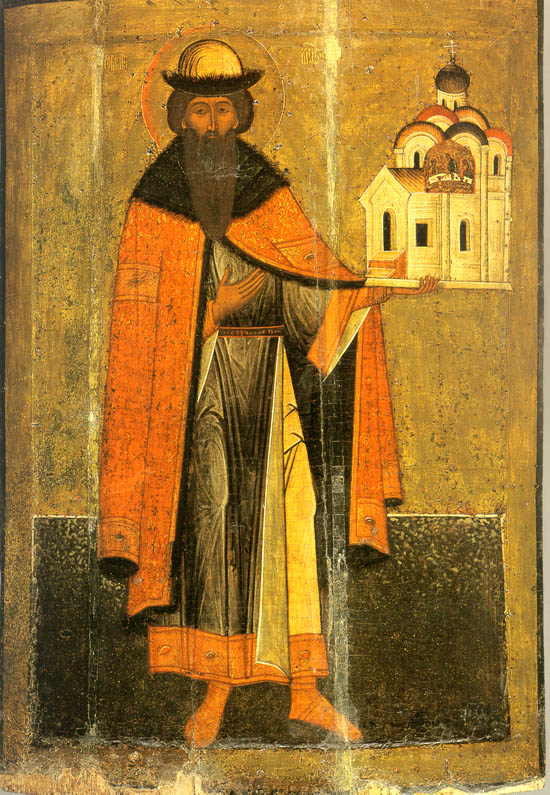
St. Vsevolod (in holy baptism Gabriel), Prince and Wonderworker of Pskov

== Sources ==
- April 22 / May 5. Orthodox Calendar (PRAVOSLAVIE.RU).
- May 5 / April 22. Holy Trinity Russian Orthodox Church (A parish of the Patriarchate of Moscow).
- April 22. OCA - The Lives of the Saints.
- The Autonomous Orthodox Metropolia of Western Europe and the Americas. St. Hilarion Calendar of Saints for the year of our Lord 2004. St. Hilarion Press (Austin, TX). p. 30.
- April 22. Latin Saints of the Orthodox Patriarchate of Rome.
- The Roman Martyrology. Transl. by the Archbishop of Baltimore. Last Edition, According to the Copy Printed at Rome in 1914. Revised Edition, with the Imprimatur of His Eminence Cardinal Gibbons. Baltimore: John Murphy Company, 1916. pp. 113–114.
- Rev. Richard Stanton. A Menology of England and Wales, or, Brief Memorials of the Ancient British and English Saints Arranged According to the Calendar, Together with the Martyrs of the 16th and 17th Centuries. London: Burns & Oates, 1892. pp. 176–177.

Greek Sources

- Great Synaxaristes: (in Greek) 22 Απριλίου. Μεγασ Συναξαριστησ.
- (in Greek) Συναξαριστής. 22 Απριλίου. ecclesia.gr. (H Εκκλησια Τησ Ελλαδοσ).

Russian Sources

- (in Russian) 5 мая (22 апреля). Православная Энциклопедия под редакцией Патриарха Московского и всея Руси Кирилла (электронная версия). (Orthodox Encyclopedia - Pravenc.ru).
- (in Russian) 22 апреля (ст.ст.) 5 мая 2013 (нов. ст.). Русская Православная Церковь Отдел внешних церковных связей.
