= May 5 (Eastern Orthodox liturgics) =

Day in the Eastern Orthodox liturgical calendar

Eastern Orthodox liturgical calendar
| May 4 | May 5 | May 6 |
May 5 O.S. ≍ May 18 N.S. May 5 N.S ≍ April 22 O.S.

An Eastern Orthodox cross

May 5 in Eastern Orthodox liturgical calendars is a feast day and a day of commemoration of saints and martyrs. Although some Orthodox churches use the Revised Julian Calendar and others use the traditional Julian calendar, the fixed commemorations for their respective May 5 are broadly the same, no matter which calendar is used. (Note: Despite the dates being the same, the days to which they refer typically differ by 13 days. The notation Old Style or O.S. is sometimes used to indicate a date in the traditional Julian Calendar (the "Old Calendar"). The notation New Style or N.S. indicates a date in the Revised Julian calendar (the "New Calendar").)

== Saints ==
- Virgin-martyr Sandukht [Sagdukht] (c. 50)
- Great Virgin-martyr Irene of Thessalonica (also Irene of Lecce) (1st-2nd century)
- Martyrs Irenaeus, Pellegrinus and Irene, at Thessaloniki (284–305)
- Martyrs Neophytus, Gaius, and Gaianus.
- Saint Eulogius the Confessor, Bishop of Edessa (c. 386)
- Saints Martin and Heraclius, of Illyria (4th century)
- Saint Hierax of Egypt (5th century)
- Saint Euthymius the Wonderworker, bishop of Madytos on the Hellespont (c. 990)
- Nun-martyr Martha, Abbess of Monemvasia, with three companions (990)

== Pre-Schism Western saints ==
- Martyr Jovinian, the lector of St. Peregrine of Auxerre (c. 304)
- Saint Brito (Britonius) (386)
- Saint Nectarius of Vienne, Bishop of Vienne (c. 445)
- Saint Nicetus of Vienne, fifteenth bishop of Vienne (c. 449)
- Saint Hilary (Hilarion), Archbishop of Arles (449)
- Saint Gerontius of Milan (470)
- Martyr Crescentiana of Rome (5th century) (Note: The only evidence for the life of Saint Crescentiana is a church in Rome dedicated to her that was already extant at the time of Pope Symmachus (498-514) (Benedictines).)
- Saint Hydrock (Hydroc) of Cornwall (5th century)
- Saint Gibrian, hermit in Ireland (509)
- Saint Sacerdos of Saguntum (c. 560)
- Saint Waldrada, first abbess of Saint-Pierre-aux-Nonnains in Metz in France (c. 620)
- Saint Diuma, first Bishop of Mercia (c. 650)
- Saint Maurontius of Douai (Maurontus, Mauront), founded monastery at Breuil-sur-lys near Douai, of which he is the patron-saint (701)
- Saint Echa of Crayke, (Etha), Anglo-Saxon priest and monk-hermit at Crayke, near York, England (767)

== Post-Schism Orthodox saints ==
- Saints Barlaam of Serpukhov, and Gideon of Serpukhov (1377) (Note: St Barlaam and his holy icon are venerated in Ukraine by those afflicted with the inclination to drinking; their friends and relatives also invoke his intercession on their behalf.)
- New Monk-martyr Ephraim of Nea Makri (1426)
- New Hieromartyr Ephraim of Damascus, prophet (15th century)
- Saint Adrian, Abbot of Monza Monastery, Galich (1610) (Note: See: (in Russian) Адриан Монзенский. Википедии. (Russian Wikipedia).)
- Saint Matrona Ciupelea, Abbess of Hurezi Monastery (1935) (Note: See: (in Romanian) Matrona Ciupelea. Wikipedia. (Romanian Wikipedia).)

=== New martyrs and confessors ===
- New Hieromartyr Nicholas, priest (1919)
- New Hieromartyr Platon of Banja Luka (Platon Jovanovic) (1941) (see also: April 22)

== Other commemorations ==
- Translation of the relics (980) of Saint Aldhelm, Bishop of Sherborne (709)
- Dedication of the Church of Mother of God of Kirou at Constantinople and commemoration of the solar eclipse (1369)
- Uncovering of the relics (1613) of Saint James of Zheleznoborov, (Note: See: (in Russian) Иаков Железноборовский. Википедии. (Russian Wikipedia).) Abbot of Zhelezny Borok Monastery, Kostroma (1422)
- Uncovering of the relics (1675) of Saint Pachomius of Nerekhta, Abbot of Zhelezny Bor (1384)
- Icon of the Most Holy Theotokos "Inexhaustible Cup" (1878)

== Icon gallery ==
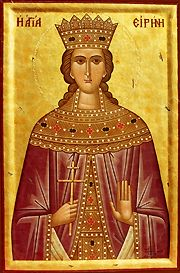
Great-martyr Irene of Thessaloniki.

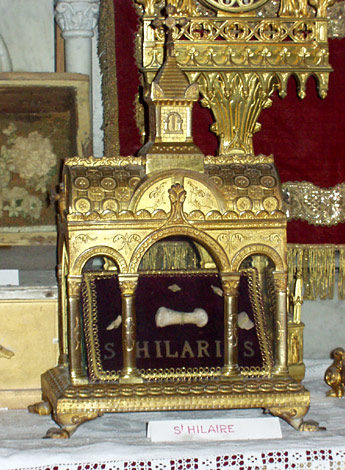
Reliquary of Saint Hilary of Arles.

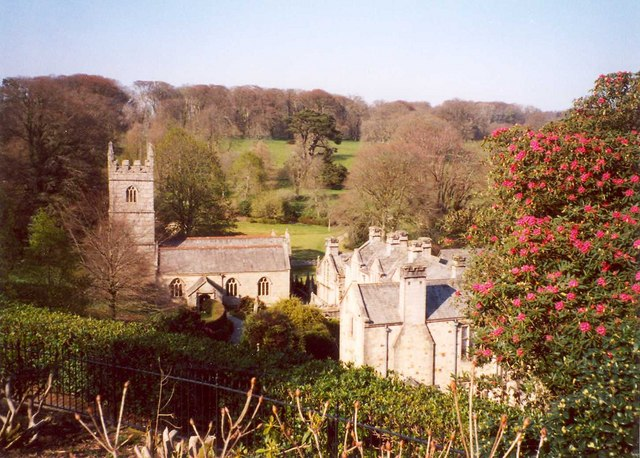
St. Hydrock's Church, in Lanhydrock, Cornwall.

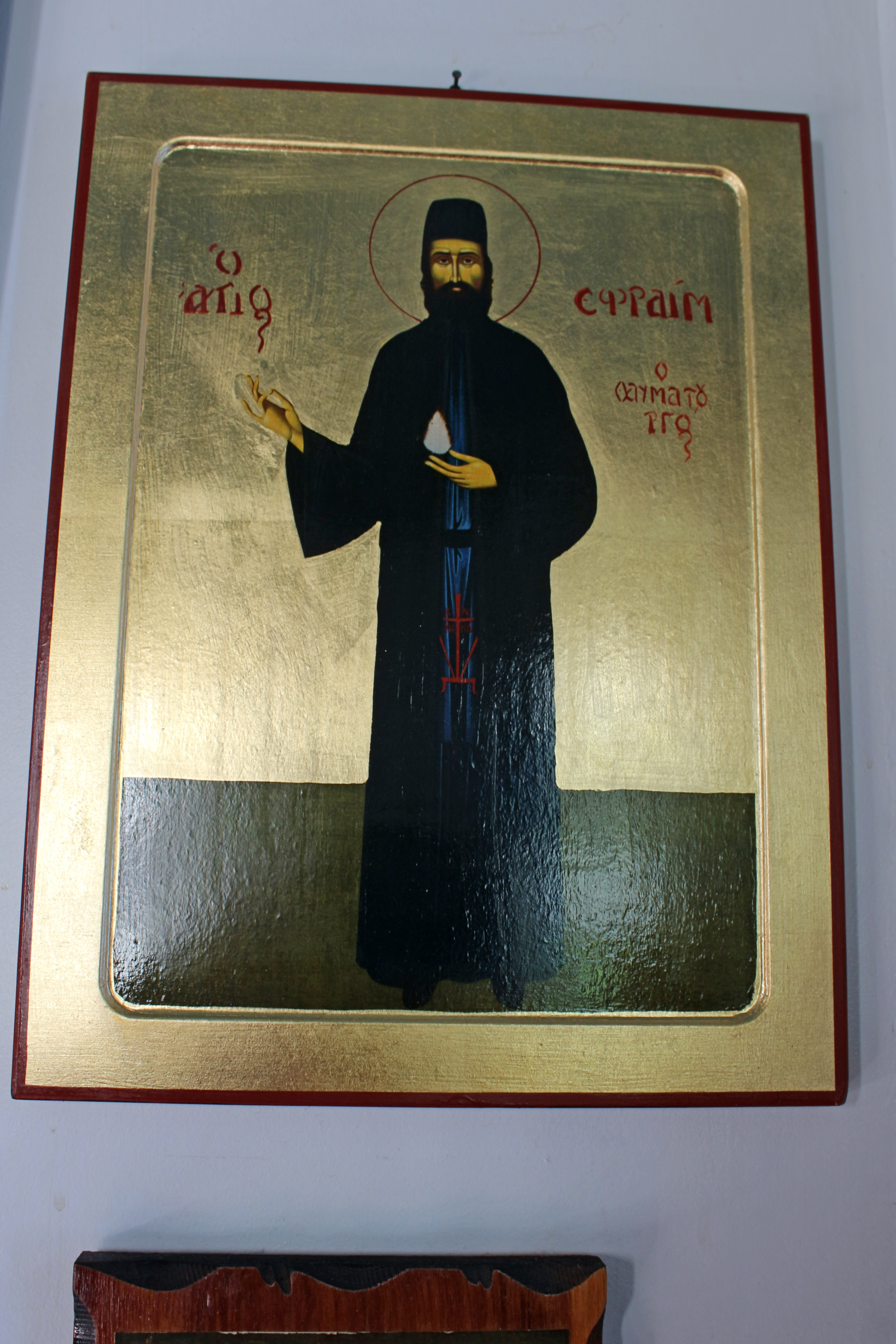
New Monk-martyr Ephraim of Nea Makri.

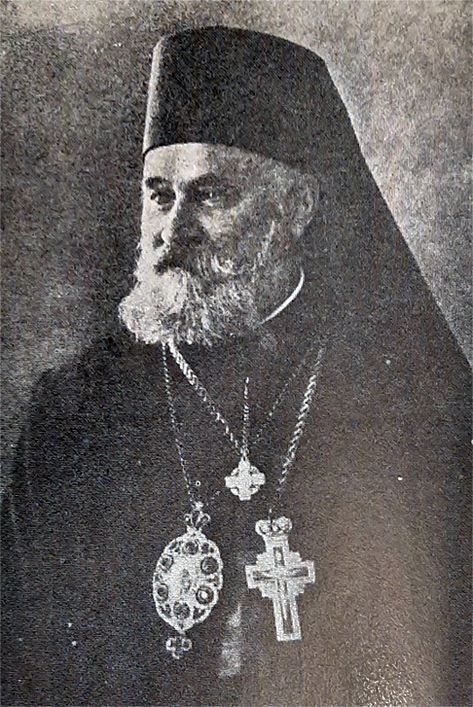
Bishop Platon (Jovanović).

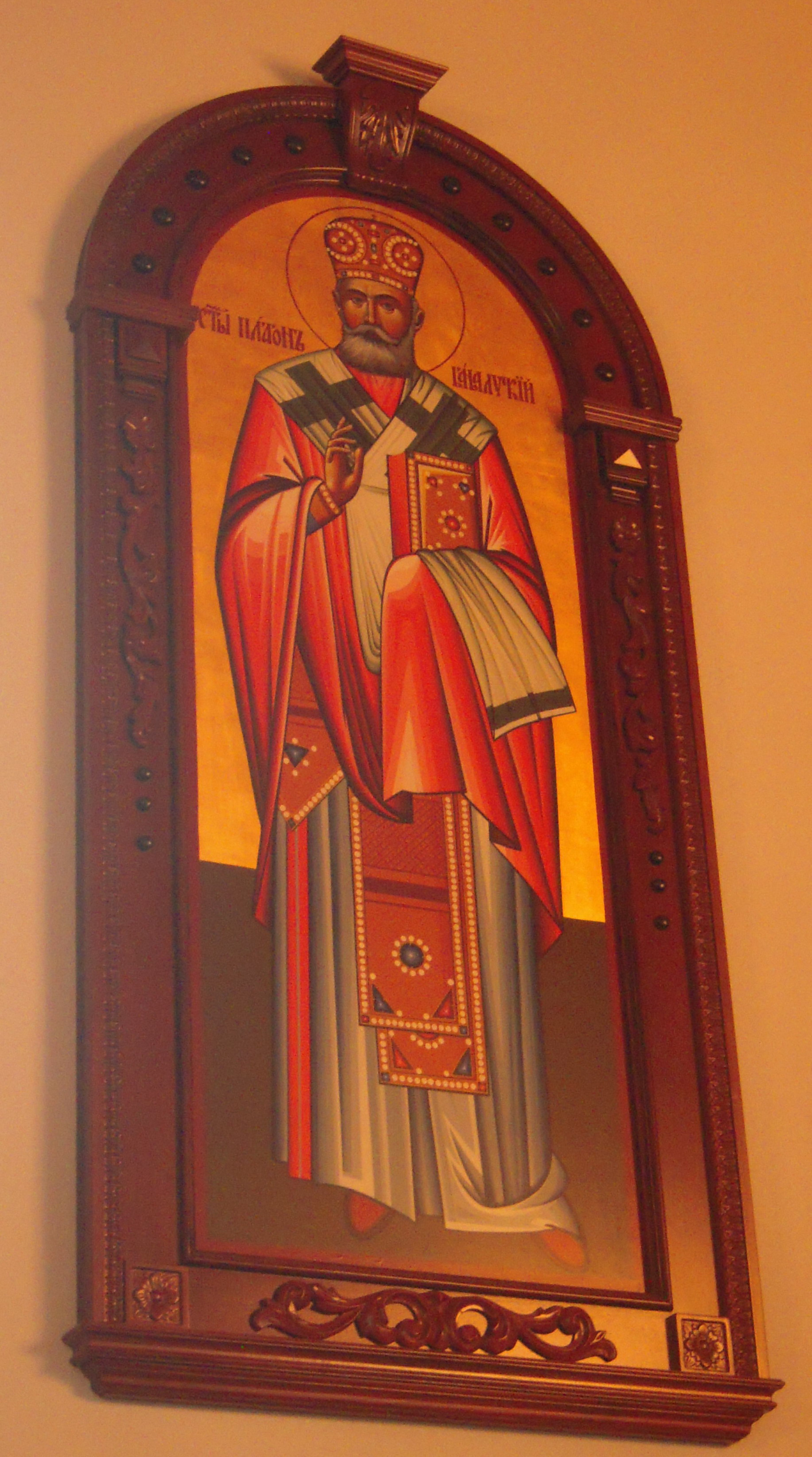
St. Platon of Banja Luka.

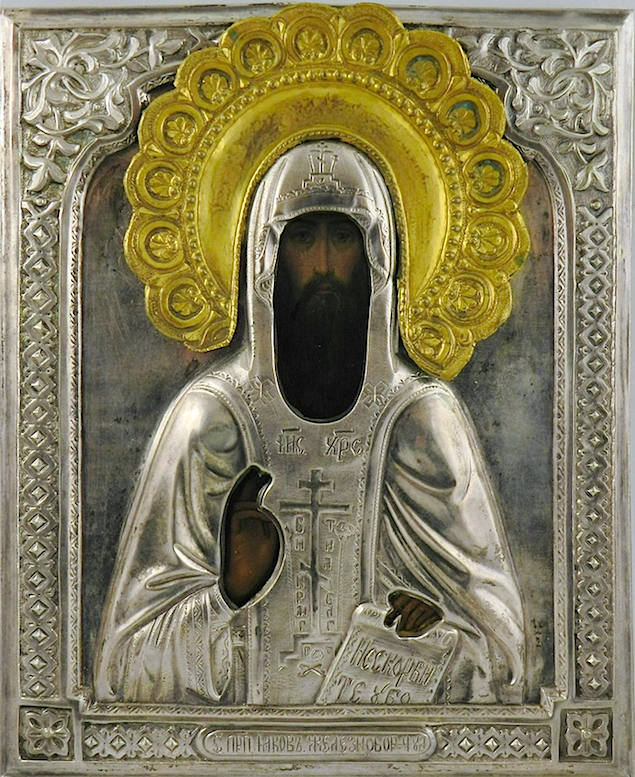
Saint James of Zheleznoborov.

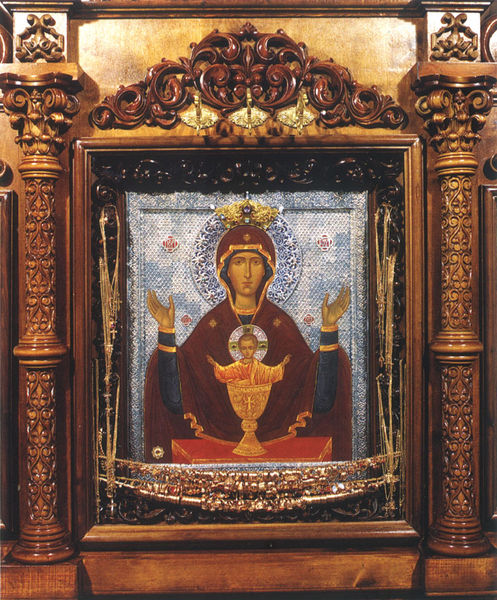
Icon of the Theotokos the Inexhaustible Chalice.

== Sources ==
- May 5/18. Orthodox Calendar (PRAVOSLAVIE.RU).
- May 18, 2011 / May 5, HOLY TRINITY RUSSIAN ORTHODOX CHURCH (A parish of the Patriarchate of Moscow)
- May 5, OCA - The Lives of the Saints.
- May 5. Latin Saints of the Orthodox Patriarchate of Rome.
- May 5. The Roman Martyrology.

Greek Sources

- Great Synaxaristes: (in Greek) 5 ΜΑΪΟΥ, ΜΕΓΑΣ ΣΥΝΑΞΑΡΙΣΤΗΣ.
- (in Greek) Συναξαριστής. 5 Μαΐου. ECCLESIA.GR. (H ΕΚΚΛΗΣΙΑ ΤΗΣ ΕΛΛΑΔΟΣ).

Russian Sources

- (in Russian) 18 мая (5 мая). Православная Энциклопедия под редакцией Патриарха Московского и всея Руси Кирилла (электронная версия). (Orthodox Encyclopedia - Pravenc.ru).
- (in Russian) 5 мая (ст.ст.) 18 мая 2013 (нов. ст.). Русская Православная Церковь Отдел внешних церковных связей. (DECR).
