= Michael of Klopsk =

Russian monk (died 1456)

Saint Michael of Klopsk
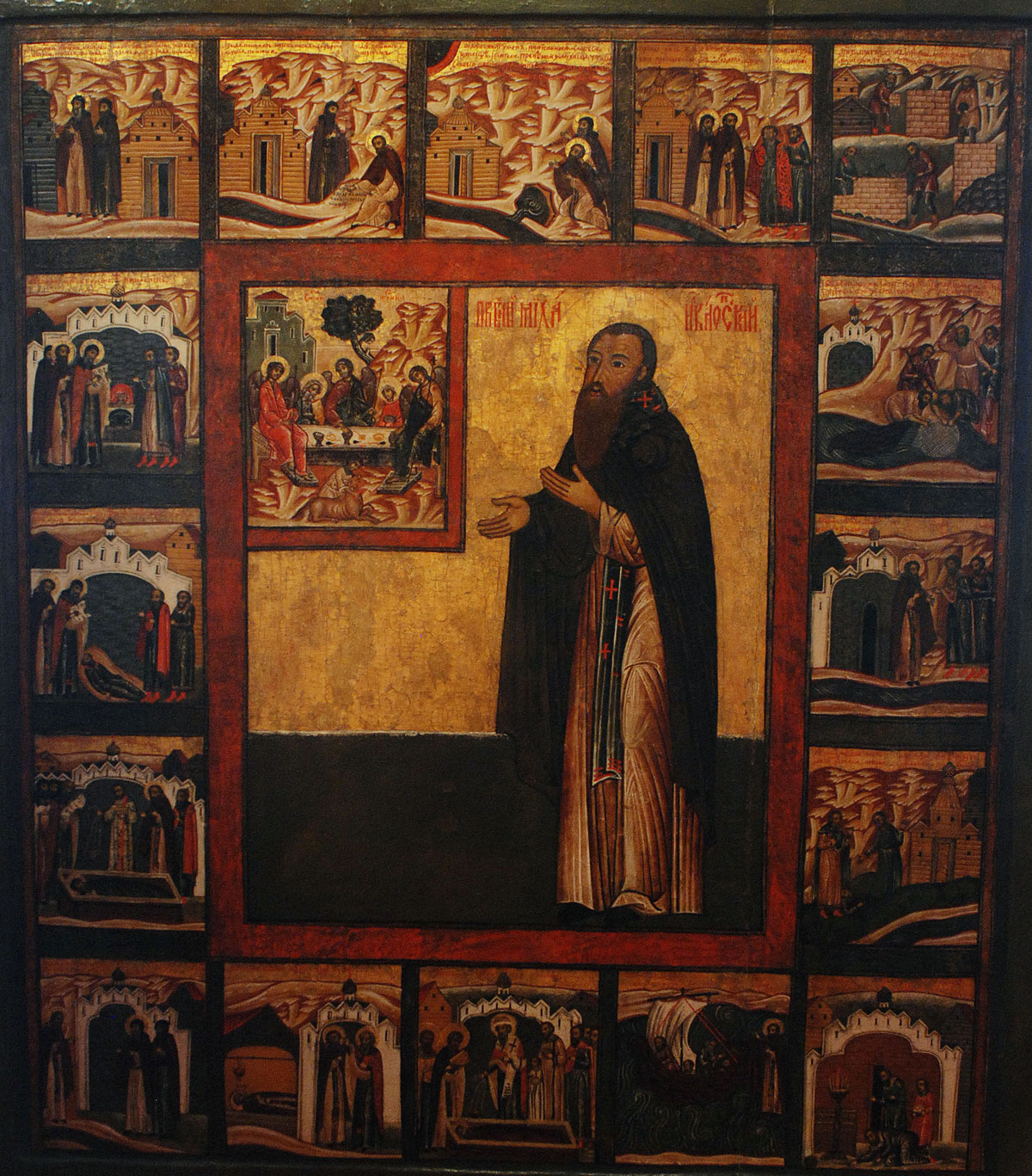
- 17th century icon of St. Michael

Fool for Christ, Venerable
- Died: 1456
- Honored in: Eastern Orthodox Church
- Canonized: 1547
- Feast: 11 January

Michael of Klopsk (Russian: Михаил Клопский, romanized: Mikhail Klopsky; died 1456) was a Russian Orthodox monk and fool for Christ associated with the Klopsky Monastery of the Holy Trinity, located near Novgorod on the river Veryazha.

== Biography ==
According to Valentin Yanin, Michael was the son or grandson of Dmitry Mikhailovich Volyn-Bobrok ("Little Beaver"), a hero of the Battle of Kulikovo, and Anna Ivanovna, daughter of Grand Prince Ivan II of Moscow, and sister of Dmitry Donskoy. A hagiography of the saint, was written in 1478–1479, redacted in the 1490s, and again in 1537. Although folklorish in nature, it provides the earliest literary evidence for Michael's activities in the monastery.

During the period of the Muscovite–Lithuanian Wars, a mysterious fool-for-Christ's-sake appeared in the Monastery of the Holy Trinity. Sometime after being accepted by the monastery, but still nameless to his fellow monks, he was recognized by prince Konstantin Dmitrievich (1389–1433), who visited the monastery with his wife in 1413, as "our Mikhail".

Among the miracles attributed to the saint by the hagiography are the conversion of robbers, one of whom became the monk Dorofey, the discovery of an inexhaustible fountain, the prediction of weather, and various other acts of clairvoyance and prophecy.

Michael died in 1456 and was canonized by the Russian Orthodox Church a century later, in 1547. His memory is commemorated by the Eastern Orthodox Church on January 11. His relics are venerated at the Klopsky Monastery.
