= Atessa =

Atessa L'Atésse
- Comune
- Comune di Atessa
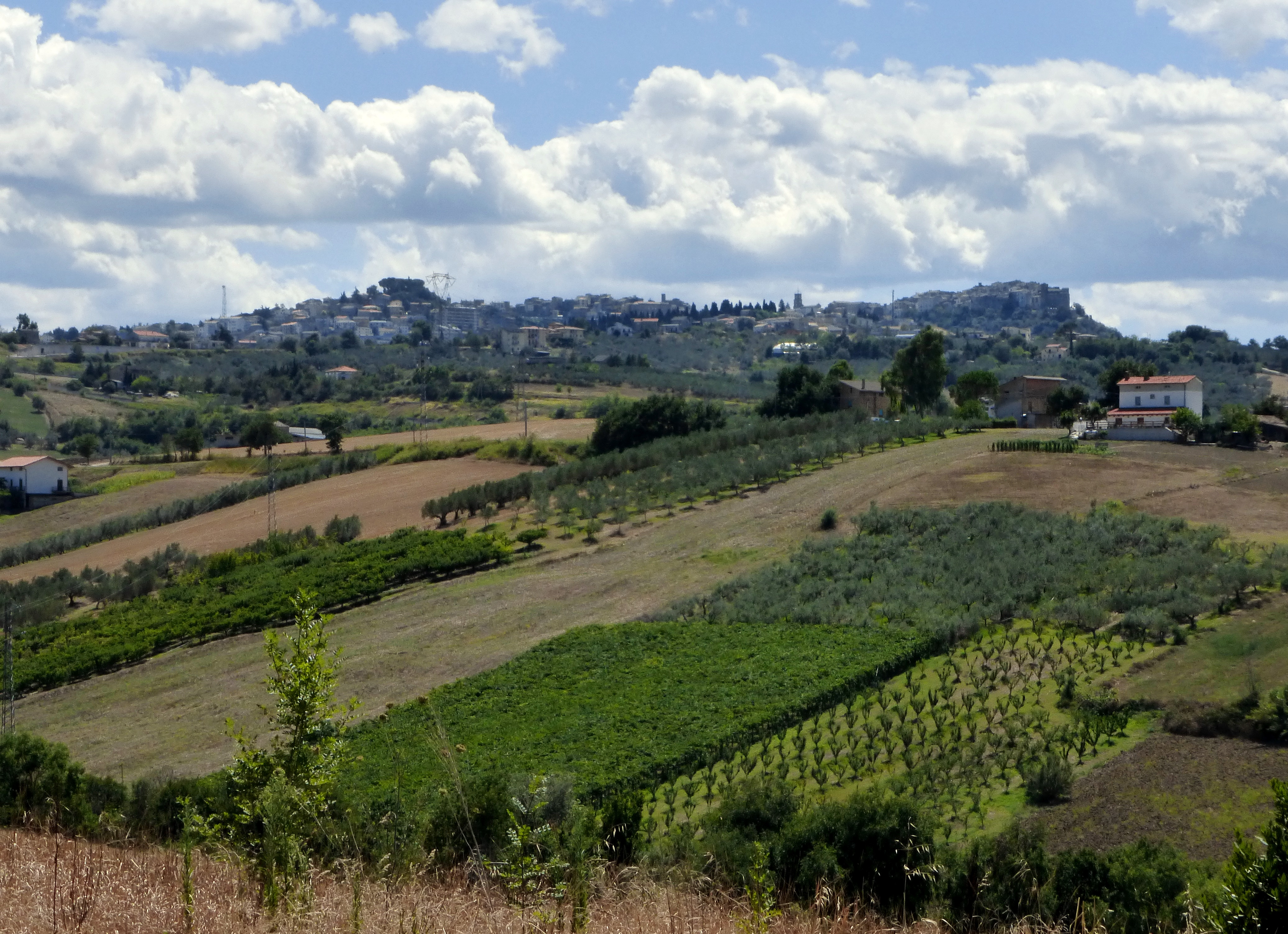

- Coat of arms

- Location of Atessa in Italy Atessa (Abruzzo)
- Coordinates: 42°04′N 14°27′E
- Country: Italy
- Region: Abruzzo
- Province: Chieti (CH)
- Frazioni: Multiple: Aia Santa Maria, Boragna Fontanelle, Boragna San Paolo, Campanelle, Capragrassa, Carapelle, Carriera, Casale, Castellano, Castelluccio, Ceripollo, Colle Comune, Colle d'Aglio, Colle delle Pietre, Colle Flocco, Colle Grilli, Colle Martinelli, Colle Palumbo, Colle Quarti, Colle Rotondo, Colle San Giovanni, Colle Sant'Angelo, Colle Santinella, Colle Santissimo, Cona, Coste Iadonato, Croce Pili, Fazzoli, Fontegrugnale, Fontesquatino, Forca di Iezzi, Forca di Lupo, Fornelli, Giarrocco, Ianico, Lentisce, Mandorle, Mandrioli, Masciavò, Masseria Grande, Molinello, Montecalvo, Montemarcone, Monte Pallano, Monte San Silvestro, Osento, Passo del Vasto, Passo Pincera, Piana Ciccarelli, Piana dei Monaci, Piana dell'Edera, Piana Fallascosa, Piana La Fara, Piana Matteo, Piana Osento, Piana Sant'Antonio, Piana Vacante, Pianello, Piazzano, Pietrascritta, Pili, Querceto, Quercianera, Rigatella, Riguardata Scalella, Rocconi, Saletti, San Giacomo, San Luca, San Marco, Sant'Amico, San Tommaso, Satrino, Sciola, Scorciagallo, Siberia, Solagna Longa, Solagna Rigatella, Sterpari, Vallaspra, Varvaringi

Government
  - Mayor: Giulio Sciorilli Borrelli

Area
  - Total: 110.98 km^{2} (42.85 sq mi)
- Elevation: 435 m (1,427 ft)

Population (30 April 2017)
  - Total: 10,558
  - Density: 95.134/km^{2} (246.40/sq mi)
- Demonym: Atessani
- Time zone: UTC+1 (CET)
  - Summer (DST): UTC+2 (CEST)
- Postal code: 66041
- Dialing code: 0872
- Patron saint: St. Leucius of Brindisi
- Saint day: 11 January
- Website: Official website

Atessa (locally L'Atésse) is a municipality in the province of Chieti, Abruzzo, southern Italy. It is part of the Val di Sangro mountain community. It is the largest municipality in the province by extension and eighth by population.

The closest airport is Abruzzo Airport, which is 41 miles distance. The closest beach is Lido di Casalbordino, a 17 miles drive. The town hospital is Azienda Sanitaria Locale 2 Lanciano, though there are several other medical center options available in town. The closest railway station is Atessa Vasto-S. Salvo train station, 2 miles from city center.

== Geography ==
The town is located in the lower valley of the Sangro river. Its area, with its 11,003 hectares, is the largest in the province and includes a small part decentralized from the rest of the territory, south of the hamlet of Tornareccio. It includes a series of promontories that reach the vast floodplain of the Sangro.

The village of Atessa winds on top of a relief from the crescent-shaped plant, isolated on the surrounding countryside, whose highest point is 473 meters, at the Villa Comunale.

The watercourses that run through the municipal territory are numerous, mostly tributaries of the main rivers, the Sangro to the west and the Osento to the east.

The subsoil consists of one of the last ridges where there are ancient stratified sandy deposits, visible in the numerous outcrops of the escarpments, with an ocher-yellow color. These sediments, evidence of the permanence of the coastline in this place and the following regression of the sea between the end of the Pliocene and the beginning of the Quaternary, rest on clayey soils (blue-gray clays), the result of the sedimentation in the open sea of terrigenous materials . The large hills are thus constituted, on which are found the majority of the districts, connected by a dense network of secondary roads to the most important ones of the valley bottom.

== History ==
The origins of Atessa according to some sources date back to the fifth century AD, after the fall of the Western Roman Empire.

In the Middle Ages it was a fief of various lords including: the Courtenay or Cortinaccio, Philip I of Flanders, the Maramonte, the Counts of Monteodorisio, king Ferdinand I of Naples and the Colonna.

After the abolishment of feudalism in the Kingdom of the Two Sicilies (early 19th century), the land was in misery. There was a brief recovery, but a subsequent cholera epidemic that hit the area between 1816 and 1817 deprived it of any improvement.

== Main sights ==
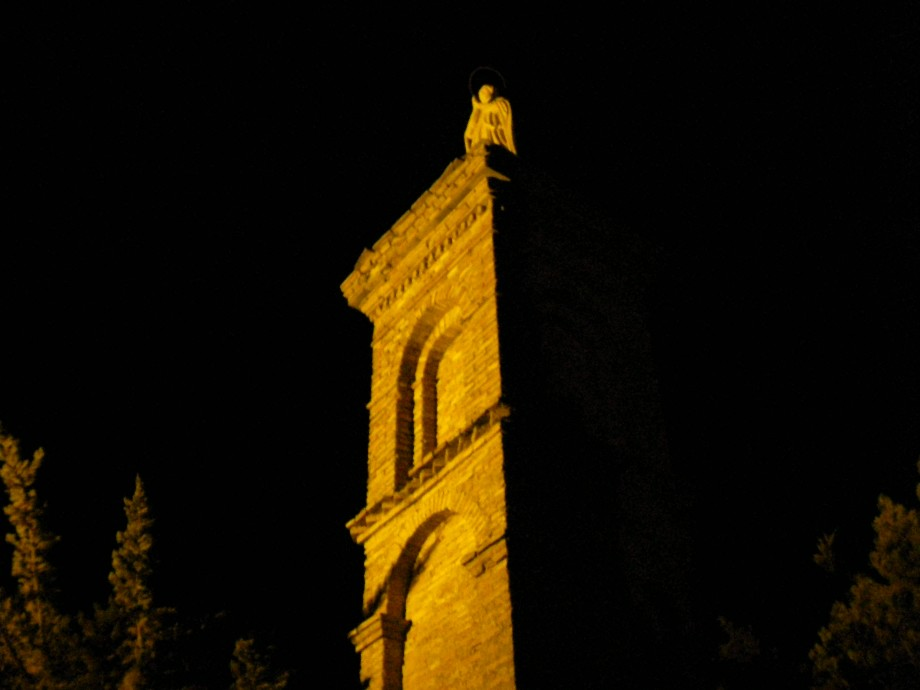
Column of St. Christopher.

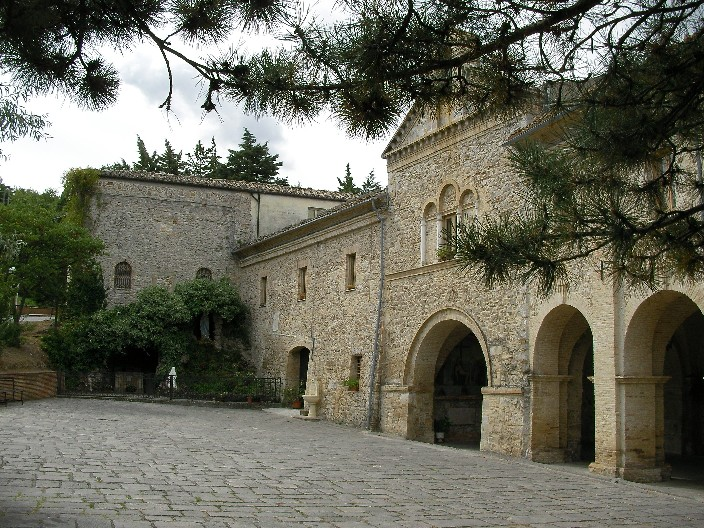
Convent of San Pasquale.

The city preserves the historical center in 17th-century, late Renaissance style, with few remains of the ancient medieval walls in the urban gates of San Michele, San Giuseppe, San Nicola and Santa Margherita. The city is divided into two sections: the first is the oldest, represented by the bulk of the Cathedral of San Leucio, and at its end, towards the plain of the Sangro, from the fortified church of Santa Croce; while the second section is crossed by the Corso Vittorio Emanuele, and passes through the Arch 'Ndriano (former Porta San Nicola), from Piazza Garibaldi to the hill of San Cristoforo, from the votive column raised on the top.

=== Religious buildings ===
- Cathedral of San Leucio (13th century), characterized by a Gothic-style exterior with a pointed portal and a beamed rosette. The Baroque interior has works by Nicola da Guardiagrele, as well as a relic of "rib of the Dragon" that, according to the legend, had been killed by the namesake saint.
- Church of Santa Croce (14th century), already existing in Lombards times. After the 18th century restorations, the church today has a Gothic-style exterior with a pointed portal, a sturdy bell tower, and a stuccoed interior with a basilica plan.
- Convent of San Pasquale and Church of Santa Maria degli Angeli (1408–1431). It has a large façade with a pediment. A large arch introduces the medieval portico, with a Renaissance cloister. The Baroque interior has a decorated wooden coffered ceiling.
- Church of the Madonna della Cintura (14th century)
- Church of San Pietro (1467) - now deconsecrated.
- Church of Our Lady of Sorrows (17th century), restored after World War II. It has a rectangular plan with a single nave. The façade is very decorated with bas-reliefs, on the lower level of the pilasters supporting four decorative columns.
- Church of San Rocco (16th century). The interior has polychrome altars.
- Church of Sant'Antonio (17th century).
- Church of San Michele, a 7th-century building completely restored in the 18th century. It has a simple Baroque façade, with a turreted lateral bell tower.
- Church of San Marco (1896)

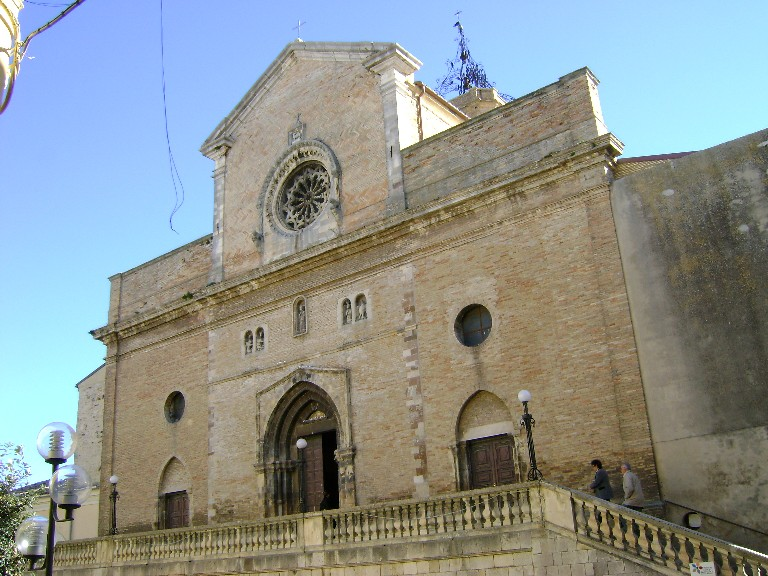
Duomo di San Leucio

Church of San Domenico (1566) - church with an unfinished Baroque façade, with rich frescoed interior. There are scenes of the Apostles.

=== Other sights ===
- Casa De Marco (14th century), supposed to be the medieval castle, later expanded and transformed into a noble residence in the 18th century. It has a fortified exterior, with Renaissance mullioned windows, and today houses the Ethnographic Museum.
- Porta San Michele, simple arched urban door of the old city.
- Arco 'Ndriano, a large 13th-century gate. It has a very wide thickness, including an upper apartment which was once reserved for the guards.
- Porta Santa Margherita (6th century). It is a simple stone arched structure, near the church of Santa Margherita.
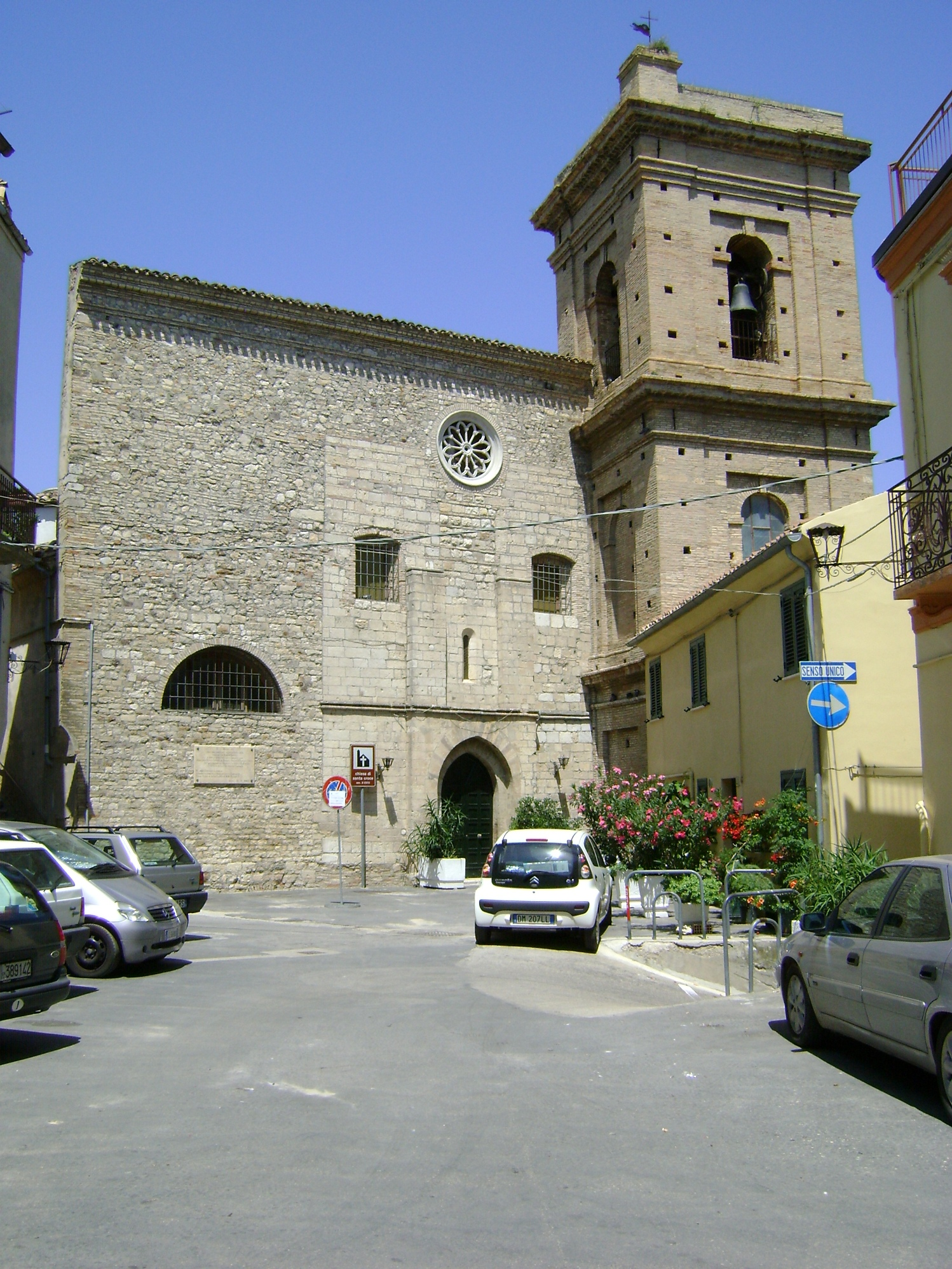
  Santa Croce
  Porta San Giuseppe
- Walls of the medieval village (13th century).
- Palazzo Coccia-Ferri (1569), originally in Renaissance style
- Palazzo Spaventa (17th century)
- Palazzo Marcolongo: located in Largo Castello, embellished by a Renaissance portal, although the structure dates back to 1724.
- Cyclopean Walls of the Pallanum site, restored in the 1990s, now part of an archaeological park.
- Column of San Cristoforo (1657)
