= Saletti =

- Frazione
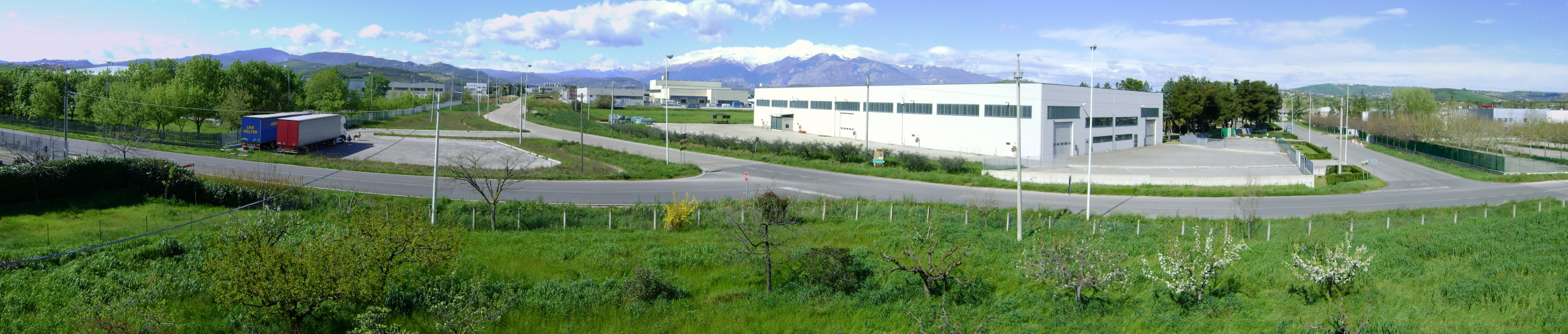
- View of industrial zone in Saletti

- Location within Italy
- Coordinates: 42°08′45″N 14°26′35″E
- Country: Italy
- Region: Abruzzo
- Province: Chieti
- Commune: Atessa
- Time zone: UTC+1 (CET)
  - Summer (DST): UTC+2 (CEST)

Saletti is a frazione (borough) of Atessa, province of Chieti, in the Abruzzo region of Italy.

The name Saletti comes from the name of the pieces of land created by the Sangro River as a result of flooding. Until the 1940s, Saletti was called Boragna La Selva, because it was a wooded area that was marshy in some places.
