= Saint Ephraim Monastery, Nea Makri =

Women's monastery in Attica, Greece

Saint Ephraim Monastery
- Μονή Αγίου Εφραίμ
- Interactive map of Saint Ephraim Monastery

Monastery information
- Other names: Annunciation of the Theotokos Monastery
- Established: 10th century
- Dedicated to: Annunciation of the Theotokos
- Celebration date: January 3 (holy relic); March 25; May 5 (saint memory)
- Diocese: Metropolis of Kifisia

Site
- Location: Nea Makri, Attica
- Country: Greece
- Coordinates: 38°4′37″N 23°57′10″E

The Saint Ephraim Monastery (Greek: Μονή Αγίου Εφραίμ) is a women's monastery located on Mount Amomon in Attica, Greece. It is situated in the Xilokeriza area, east of Mount Pentelicus.

An older, male monastery existed at the same site, dating back to the 10th century, when many hermitages were also established on what was then known as the "mountain of the pure." The current monastery celebrates three main feast days: January 3rd, marking the discovery of the relics of Saint Ephraim, March 25th for the Annunciation, and May 5th, commemorating the martyrdom of Saint Ephraim.

The monastery is under the jurisdiction of the Metropolis of Kifissia, Amaroussion and Oropos. The tomb of 20th-century artist Fotis Kontoglou is also located in its courtyard. The abbess of the monastery is Nun Makaria the Second.

== History ==
The monastery was already in operation by 1576, though it was informally known as "Saint Paraskevi" at that time. As recorded in the Patriarchal Seal of May 10, 1611, issued by Ecumenical Patriarch Neophytos, it was officially known as the "Nativity of the Theotokos" and designated as a "Patriarchal Stavropigian Monastery." This document is preserved in the National Library of Athens.

In 1945, the monastery was reconstructed by Abbess Makaria Desypri, who restored it under its original name, "Nativity of the Theotokos." On January 3, 1950, she discovered the shroud of Saint Ephraim. In 1975, a ministerial decision restored its name to "Annunciation of the Theotokos," which, according to some sources, was revealed to her through divine intervention.

Notable events of the monastery's history include:

- In 1945, Nun Makaria discovered the ruins of the old monastery dedicated to the Annunciation and established her cell there, guided by what she believed to be divine enlightenment.
- Most of the monastery's artwork consists of donations and tributes.
- The "portable icon of Saint Ephraim," located to the left of the church entrance, was created by Fotis Kontoglou but remains unfinished.
- In 1950, the relics of Saint Ephraim were found, having been buried for 524 years since his death.
