= Vitalis of Gaza =

Egyptian hermit-saint

Saint Vitalis of Gaza
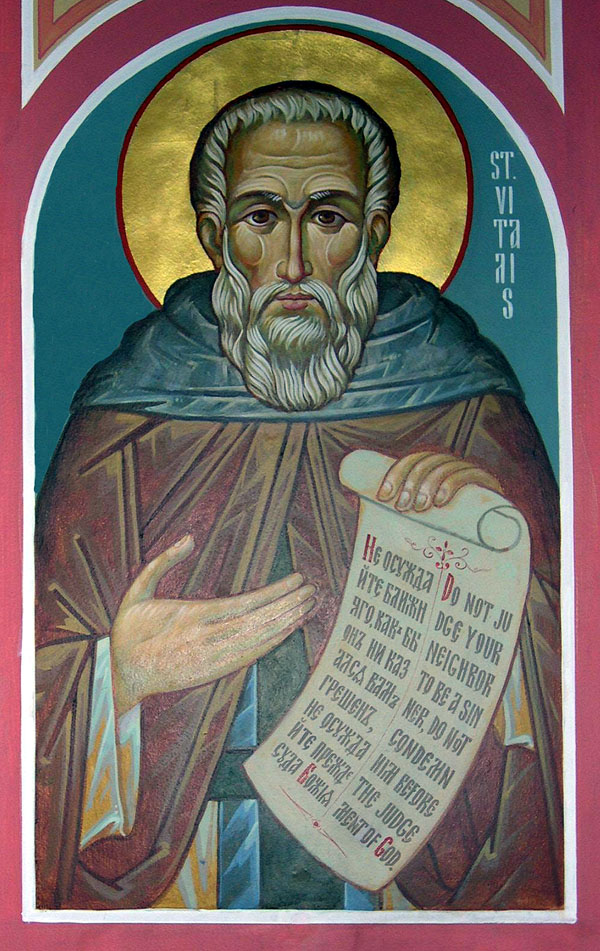
- Saint-Vitalis Orthodox Iconography

Hermit
- Born: Gaza, Palestine
- Died: c. 625 AD; Alexandria, Egypt
- Venerated in: Eastern Orthodox Church; Roman Catholic Church
- Feast: January 11; April 22 (Orthodox Church)
- Patronage: prostitutes, day-laborers

Saint Vitalis (or, Vitalius) of Gaza (died c. 625 AD) was a hermit venerated as a saint in the Eastern Orthodox Church and the Catholic Church. He is the patron saint of prostitutes and day-laborers.

== Life ==
A monk of the monastery of Seridus close to Gaza, Vitalis travelled to the city of Alexandria at the age of sixty. His legend states that after obtaining the name and address of every prostitute in the city, he hired himself out as a day laborer, and took his wage to one of these women at the end of the day. He would hire the woman for the night and, according to legend, spend the night awake and praying. As he approached the homes of the prostitutes, however, Vitalis would supposedly loudly proclaim where he was intending to visit. When questioned regarding why he was visiting prostitutes, he would respond by saying, "Have I not a body like everyone else? Are monks not like other men? Mind your own business!"

=== Death and veneration ===
Vitalis was killed when a man, misunderstanding the nature of the monk's visit to a brothel, struck him on the head. Vitalis managed to return to his hut where he died. Apparently during his burial, former prostitutes came out to explain his work before processing with candles and lanterns as his body was brought to the grave.

In the Eastern Orthodox Church, his feast days are on January 11 and April 22, while the Catholic Church only celebrates his feast on January 11.
