= Theodosius the Cenobiarch =

Byzantine saint

Saint Theodosius the Cenobiarch
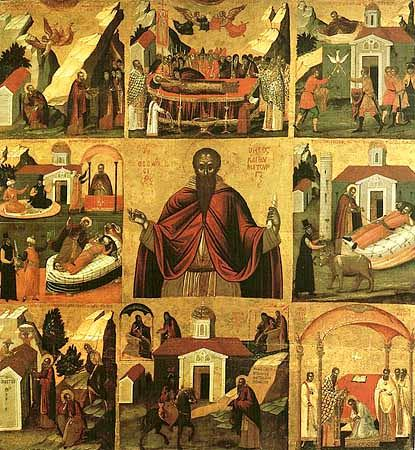

Venerable, Monk
- Born: 423; Mogarissos, Cappadocia (modern-day Turkey)
- Died: 529; Jerusalem
- Venerated in: Catholic Church; Eastern Orthodox Church
- Feast: January 11

Theodosius the Cenobiarch or Theodosius the Great (c. 423 – 529) was a Cappadocian Christian monk, abbot, and saint who was a founder and organizer of the cenobitic way of monastic life in the Judaean desert. His feast day is on January 11.

== Life ==
=== Early life ===
He was born in Mogarissos, a village in Cappadocia, Saint Basil's province. Theodosius' parents Proheresius and Eulogia were both very pious. Later Eulogia would become a nun taking her son Theodosius as her spiritual father.

=== Monastic beginnings ===
When he was younger he felt a desire to imitate Abraham by leaving his parents, friends, relatives and everything else for the love of God. Theodosius set out for Jerusalem at the time of the Holy Fourth Ecumenical Council of Chalcedon held in 451.

When Theodosius reached Antioch, he went to see Saint Symeon the Stylite, to ask for his prayers and blessing. Arriving at the pillar of Saint Symeon he was miraculously greeted by name and was invited to ascend the column. Theodosius climbed the pillar and prostrated himself before Saint Symeon who embraced him with his blessing and prophesied great spiritual glory for Theodosius.

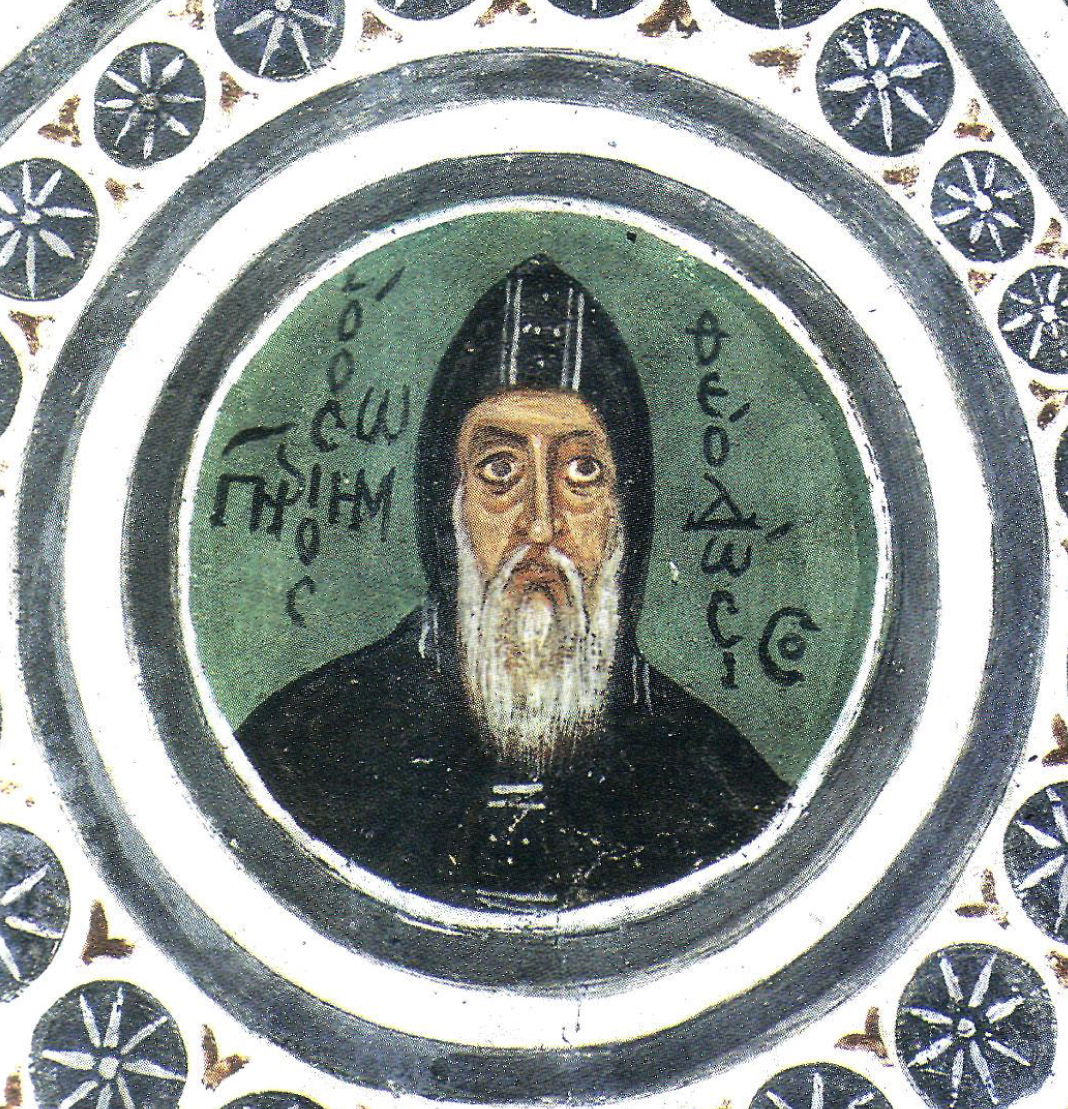

When Theodosius reached Jerusalem he spent time visiting and venerating the Holy Places. He then decided it would be best to obtain discipline for himself before he settled in solitude. Theodosius began his monastic labors under the hermit abbot Longinus, settling near the Tower of David. During this time there lived a wealthy and pious woman named Ikelia, who built a church near a place called "The Old Kathisma" and dedicated it to the Theotokos. Ikelia requested to the elder Longinus that Theodosius settle in that place to which he agreed. After some time Theodosius had many visitors and pilgrims who distracted and deprived him of his solitude.

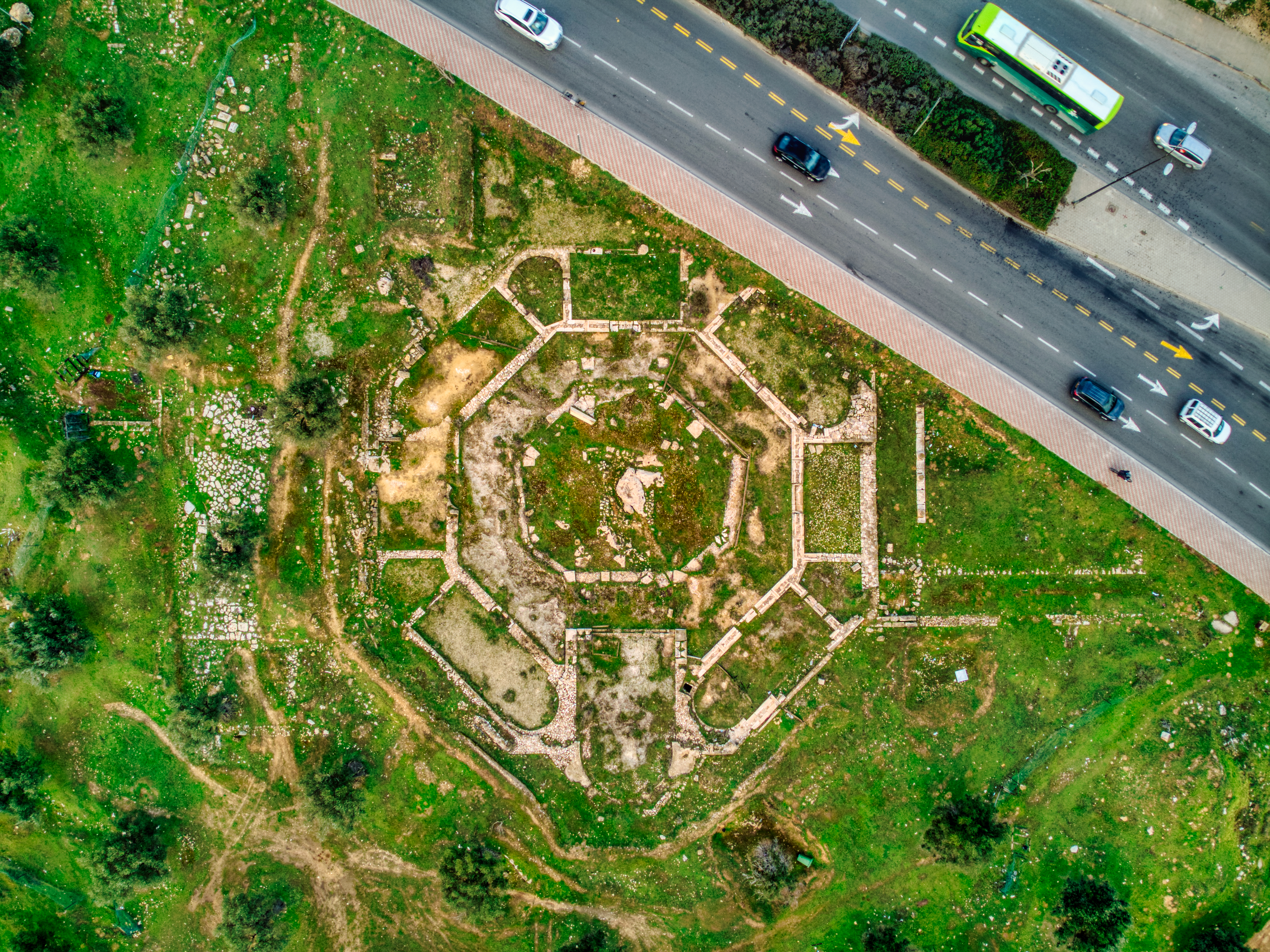
The Old Kathisma

=== Life as a hermit ===
Eventually Theodosius could no longer handle his admirers and left the Old Kathisma so that he might better dedicate himself to God. He settled on the peak of the mountain and lived in a cave. There is a tradition from the ancient fathers that this was the same cave the three Magi spent the night after they had worshiped the Lord, and that an angel was sent there and ordered them to return to their own country by another way, which they did.

While dwelling in the cave Theodosius performed great feats of asceticism. He prayed at all times and he even suspended a rope that it might prop him up in case sleep overcame him, and thus he stood through the night in prayer. He remembered never to satisfy his hunger, but ate only enough so that he would not fall ill from extreme fasting. He ate only dates, carob, wild vegetables and legumes soaked in water. If the land was unproductive and arid he soaked the hearts of palms and ate them only from excessive need. He never tasted bread for thirty years.

=== Communal life, founding of future monastery ===
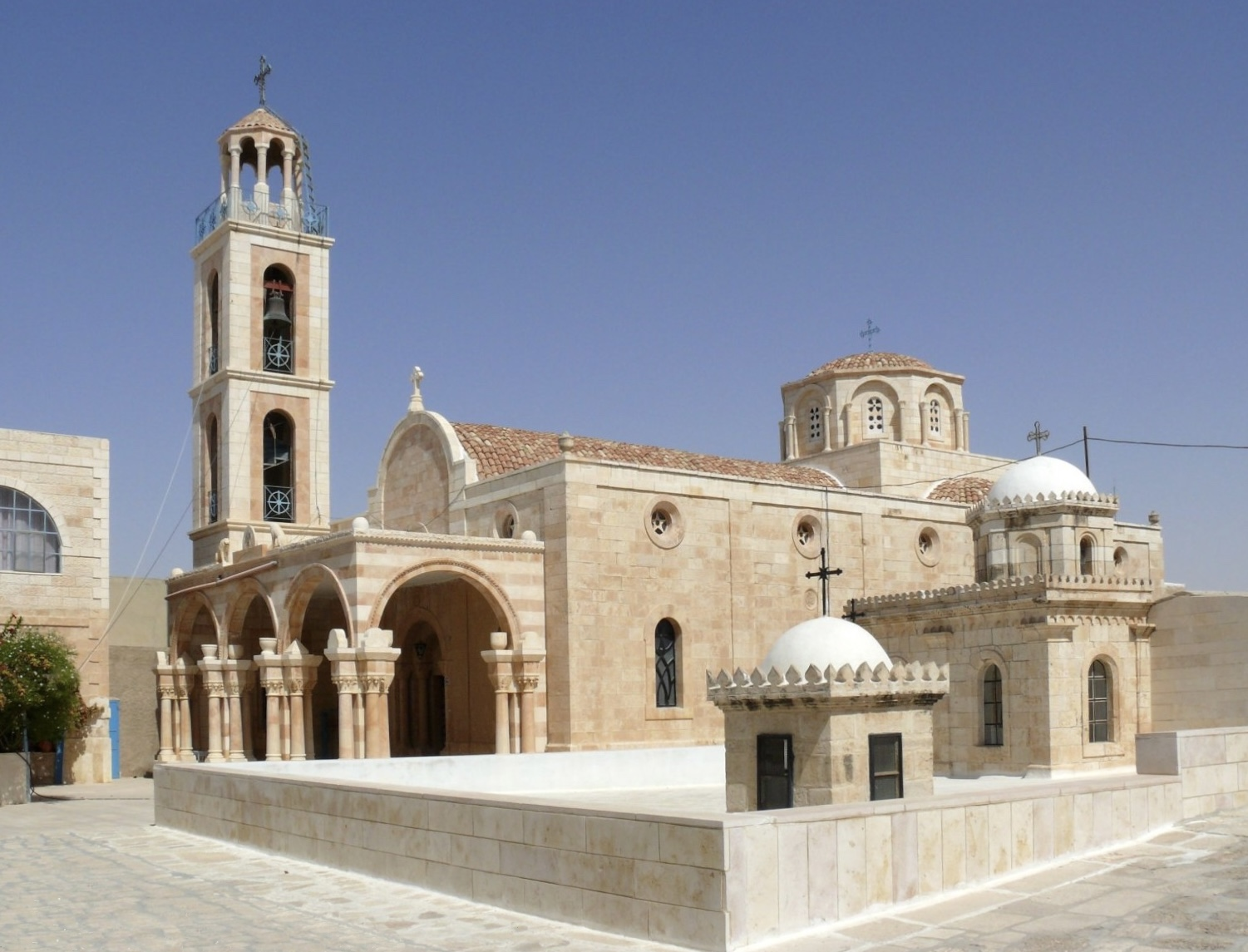
Monastery of St. Theodosius

Theodosius formed a small community of monks near Bethlehem, which later became the Monastery of St. Theodosius. The community grew rapidly, with monks of several cultures and languages, and became very well known for its work with the sick, elderly, and mentally impaired. When Theodosius' friend and countryman Sabbas was appointed archimandrite of all the isolated monks in Palestine by Patriarch Salustius of Jerusalem, Theodosius was made the leader of all those monks who lived in community. This is the origin of his being called "the Cenobiarch", which translates as chief of those living a life in common.

=== Anti-miaphysitic stance and Maronite tradition ===
Theodosius was a staunch opponent of Miaphysitism, which caused the Emperor Anastasius to remove him from office temporarily.

A Maronite tradition has it that, when Theodosius was at the age of ninety, he was exiled by Emperor Anastasius, who was fighting Chalcedonian Orthodoxy, and took refuge in Lebanon where he established the monastery of Qannoubine ("common living") in the Kadisha Valley.

=== Death ===
Theodosius died near Jerusalem, at about 105 years old.

== Sources ==
- Attwater, Donald and Catherine Rachel John. The Penguin Dictionary of Saints. 3rd edition. New York: Penguin Books, 1993. ISBN 0-14-051312-4.
- St. Demetrius of Rostov, Marretta, Fr. Thomas (Translator). The Great Collection of The Lives of the Saints, Vol V: January. Chrysostom Press, 2002. ISBN 1-889814-04-0
- Papadopulos, Leo (Translator). Four Great Fathers: Saint Paisius the Great, Saint Pachomius the Great, Saint Euthymius the Great, and Saint Theodosius. Holy Trinity Monastery, 2007. ISBN 0-88465-139-8
- St. Nikolai Velimirović, Tepsić, Fr. T. Timothy (Translator). The Prologue of Ohrid: Lives of Saints, Hymns, Reflections and Homilies for Every Day of the Year, Vol. 1. Serbian Orthodox Diocese of Western America, 2002. ISBN 0-9719505-0-4
- Great Synaxaristes: (in Greek) Ὁ Ὅσιος Θεοδόσιος ὁ Κοινοβιάρχης καὶ Καθηγητὴς τῆς Ἐρήμου. 11 Ιανουαρίου. ΜΕΓΑΣ ΣΥΝΑΞΑΡΙΣΤΗΣ.
