= Ephraim the Neomartyr =

Controversial Christian saint

Ephraim of Mount Amomon
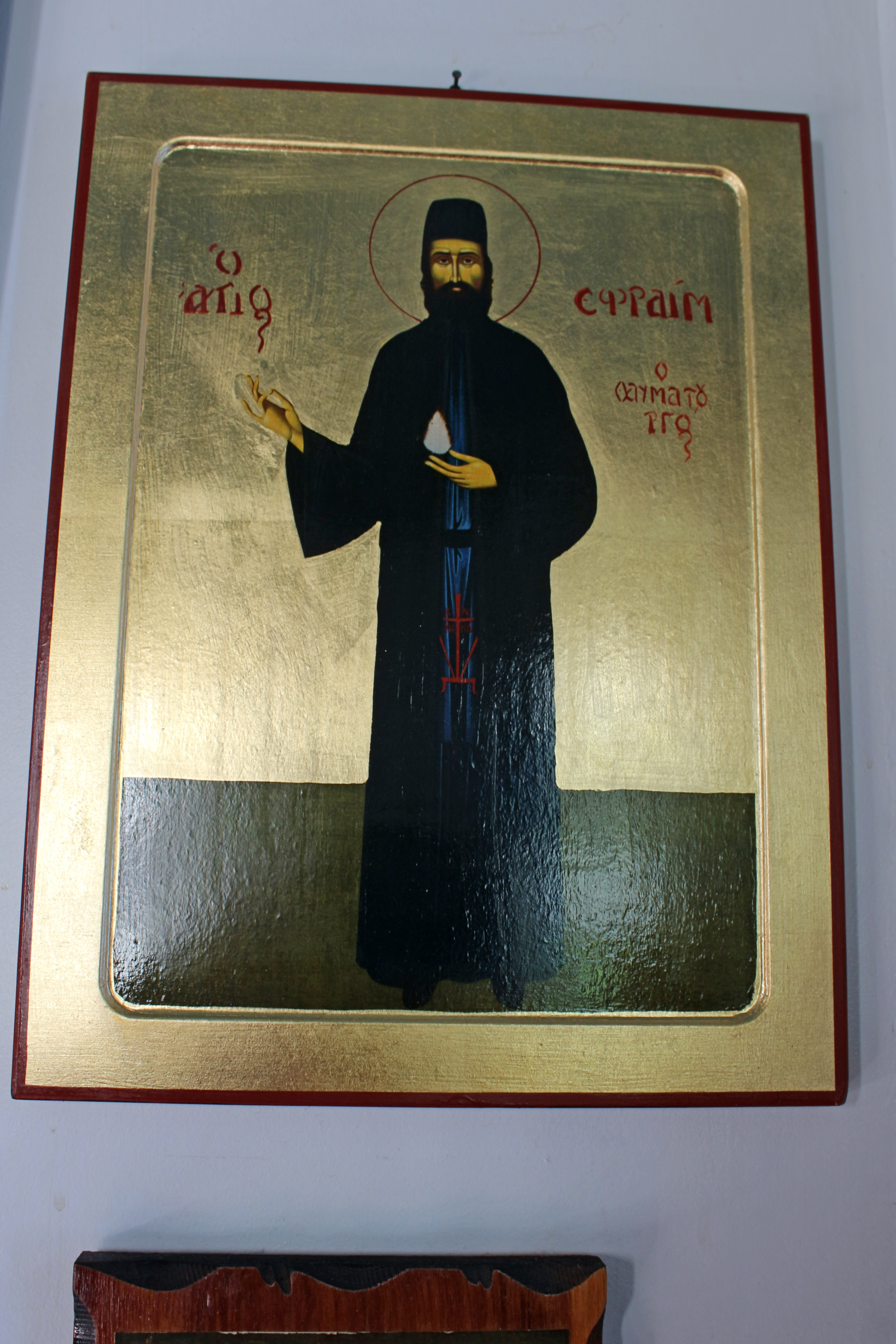
- Icon of St. Ephraim

Neomartyr
- Born: 1384
- Died: 1426; Mount Amomon
- Honored in: Eastern Orthodox Church
- Canonized: 1998 by Orthodox Church of Greece, approved by Ecumenical Patriarchate
- Feast: 3 January (discovery of body), 5 May (martyrdom)
- Controversy: existence uncertain

St. Ephraim the Neomartyr, Ephraim the Martyr, or Ephraim of Mount Amomon (Greek: Άγιος Εφραίμ ο μάρτυρας / του Όρους των Αμώμων), believed to have lived from 1384 to 1426, is venerated as a martyr and miracle-working saint by Ecumenical Patriarchate of Constantinople and Greek Orthodox Church. His status as a saint is controversial, as there are no sources testifying to his existence as an historical person. Believers regard him as a "newly revealed" ("νεοφανής") saint, whose existence is a matter of divine revelation rather than historical proof.

== History ==
St. Ephraim's name and biography, complete with exact dates and details, is said to have been revealed to a hermit nun, Makaria Desipri, in a series of divinely inspired dreams in 1950. Following these dreams, a body believed to be that of the saint was found in the ground near the nun's hermitage, on the site of an abandoned medieval monastery on the slopes of Mount Amomon, near the today town of Nea Makri, in Attica, Greece. The saint, whose body was kept as a holy relic, quickly became the object of popular veneration, as he came to be known as a worker of miraculous healings. On the site of his supposed life and martyrdom a Monastery of the Annunciation of Our Lady (Ιερά Μονή Ευαγγελισμού της Θεοτόκου) was later erected. In 1998, St. Ephraim was officially declared a saint by the Synod of the Orthodox Church in Greece, which was approved by the Patriarch of Constantinople in 2011.

== Biography ==
According to the dreams revealed to Makaria Desipri, St. Ephraim was born on 14 September 1384 in Trikala, Thessalia. His civil name was Konstantinos Morphes. He became a monk, took the monastic name of Ephraim and moved to Attica to live in what was then the Monastery of the Annunciation of Our Lady on Mount Amomon. In 1424 the monastery was destroyed by marauding Ottoman troops. Ephraim escaped and lived for another year as a hermit among the ruins of the monastery. On 14 September 1425 he was captured in another Turkish raid. He was held captive and tormented for more than eight months, until he was finally tortured to death on 5 May 1426. A mulberry tree, believed to be that on which the saint was hanged, is today shown as an object of veneration inside the re-erected monastery.

== Veneration ==
His feast days are 3 January (the anniversary of the discovery of his body), and 5 May (the anniversary of his martyrdom). St. Ephraim is portrayed in iconography as a slim, ascetic figure with black hair and beard, clad in the black robes of a monk.

The monastery in Nea Makri, the centre of the saint's veneration and his miracle-working, is now a much-frequented place of pilgrimage attracting thousands of visitors, especially people praying for the healing of illnesses. The monastery was the object of a public scandal in 2005, as the nuns of the monastery and the bishop of Attica accused each other of embezzling money from pilgrims' donations.
