= January 11 (Eastern Orthodox liturgics) =

Day in the Eastern Orthodox liturgical calendar

Eastern Orthodox liturgical calendar
January 10	January 11	January 12
January 11 O.S. ≍ January 24 N.S. January 11 N.S ≍ December 29 O.S.

An Eastern Orthodox cross

January 11 in Eastern Orthodox liturgical calendars is a feast day and a day of commemoration of saints and martyrs. Although some Orthodox churches use the Revised Julian Calendar and others use the traditional Julian calendar, the fixed commemorations for their respective January 11 are broadly the same, no matter which calendar is used. (Note: Despite the dates being the same, the days to which they refer typically differ by 13 days. The notation Old Style or O.S. is sometimes used to indicate a date in the traditional Julian Calendar (the "Old Calendar"). The notation New Style or N.S, indicates a date in the Revised Julian calendar (the "New Calendar").).

== Feasts ==
- Afterfeast of the Theophany of Our Lord and Savior Jesus Christ

== Saints ==
- Martyr Mairus (Mairos), who died of ill treatment. (Note: It is unknown where and when St. Mairus was martyred for Christ. One hagiography mentions that he is probably same saint as the Holy Maioros (or Maionos) who is celebrated on February 15. But Archbishop Sergiy (Spassky) affirmed definitely that Martyr Major of Gaza under Diocletian is a different person in view of different liturgical verses.)
- Martyrs Peter, Severius and Leucius, at Alexandria.
- Venerable Theodosius, Ascetic of Rhosus and Antioch, Wonderworker (c. 412) (see also: February 5 - Greek)
- Venerable Theodosius the Great, the Cenobiarch (529) (Note: Theodosius the Great (also Theodosius the Cenobiarch), was a founder and organizer of the cenobitic way of monastic life. The monastery that he founded in 476 AD became known as the "Monastery of St. Theodosius", and includes his tomb. It was founded east of the village of al-Ubeidiya (ancient Cathismus) in the West Bank, 12 kilometres east of Bethlehem. The current structure was built by the Crusaders in the 12th century. It is located on a hilltop and is under the administration of the Greek Orthodox Church of Jerusalem.)
- Saint Stephen of Placidian near Constantinople.
- Venerable Theodorus, and Venerable Archimandrite Agapius of Apamea in Syria.
- Venerable Vitalis (Vitalios) of the Monastery of Abba Seridus, Gaza (609–620)

== Pre-Schism Western saints ==
- Hieromartyr Hyginus, Pope of Rome (142) (Note: "AT Rome, the birthday of St. Hyginus, pope, who suffered a glorious martyrdom in the persecution of Antoninus.")
- Saint Leucius, venerated as the first Bishop of Brindisi, where he had come as a missionary from Alexandria (180)
- Hieromartyr Alexander of Fermo, Bishop, martyred under Decius (c. 250) (Note: Born in Fermo near Ancona in Italy, he became bishop of his native city and was martyred under Decius. His relics are enshrined in the Cathedral.)
- Saints Ethenia and Fidelmia, Princesses, daughters of King Laoghaire in Ireland, veiled as nuns by Saint Patrick (433)
- Martyr Salvius, in North Africa, eulogized by Saint Augustine.
- Saint Brandan, Abbot, opponent of Pelagianism (5th century) (Note: Born in Ireland, he took refuge from Pelagianism in Britain and then in France, at a monastery where he became abbot.)
- Saint Honorata of Pavia, Nun, sister of Saint Epiphanius of Pavia, who ransomed her after she was abducted from the monastery of Saint Vincent in Pavia (c. 500)
- Saint Anastasius of Castel Sant'Elia, Abbot (c. 570) (Note: A notary of the Roman church, he became monk and Abbot of Castel Sant' Elia in Italy. St. Gregory the Great narrates that St. Anastasius and his monks reposed, at the call of an angel, in quick succession.) (Note: "At Suppentonia, near Mount Soractes, the holy monk Anastasius, and his companions, who were called by a voice from heaven to enter the kingdom of God.")
- Saint Boadin the Irish, hermit in Gaul.
- Saints Paldo, Taso, and Tato, three brothers, Abbots of San Vincenzo on the Voltorno (8th century) (Note: Three brothers, born in Benevento in Italy, who became monks at Farfa and eventually founded the monastery of San Vincenzo at the headwaters of the Volturno. Of this they successively became abbots, Paldo reposing in c. 720, Taso in c. 729, and Tato in c. 739.)

== Post-Schism Orthodox saints ==
- Saint Romilos (Romilus) the Hermit of Veddin (1375)
- Venerable Theodosius of Mount Athos, Abbott of Philotheou Monastery and Metropolitan of Trebizond (1392)
- Venerable Michael of Klopsk Monastery, Novgorod, Fool-for-Christ and Wonderworker (c. 1453–1456)
- Saint Pachomius of Keno Lake (16th century)
- Saint Joseph the New of Cappadocia (c. 1860) (Note: Although January 11 is given on some calendars as the feast day for Saint Joseph the New of Cappadocia (in Greek): ῾Ο ῞Οσιος ᾿Ιωσὴφ ὁ Νέος ὁ ἐν Καππαδοκίᾳ), other sources indicate that he is celebrated on the Sunday after Theophany.)

=== New martyrs and confessors ===
- New Martyr Nikephoros of Crete, by hanging, for renouncing Islam and confessing his faith in Christ (1832)
- New Hieromartyrs, Priests (1919):

- Nicholas Matsievsky of Perm
- Theodore Antipin of Perm
- Vladimir Fokin of Krasnoyarsk

- New Hieroconfessor Vladimir Khirasko, Archpriest of Minsk (1932) (Note: See: (in Russian) Хираско, Владимир Григорьевич. Википедии. (Russian Wikipedia).)

== Other commemorations ==
- Synaxis of the Myriad of Holy Angels (Synaxis of the Myriangelon). (Note: The feast of the Synaxis of the Myriads of Holy Angels was celebrated in the Martyrium of Saint Anastasia, "in the embolus of Domninus". The Temple of the Myriangelon (The Church of the Myriads of Holy Angels) was especially renowned in the 6th century for the services in honour of the many miracles that were attributed to them.) (see also: November 8 - Synaxis of the Holy Archangels)
- Consecration of the Church of St. Stephen in Placidia Palace, Constantinople.
- Chernigov-Eletskaya Icon of the Mother of God (1060) (Note: See: (in Russian) Елецкая икона Божией Матери. Википедии. (Russian Wikipedia).)
- Glykophilousa (New Valaam) Icon of the Mother of God.
- Repose of Blessed Nun Eupraxia of Teliakov village, Kostroma (1823)

== Icon gallery ==
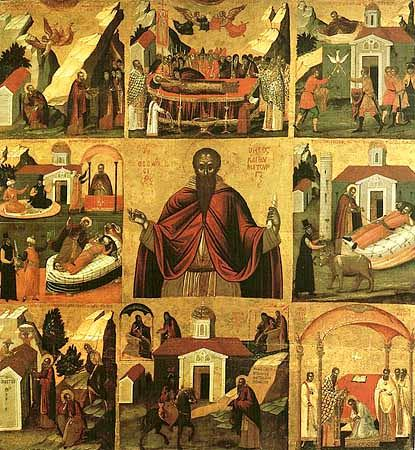
Venerable Theodosius the Cenobiarch.

Venerable Theodosius the Cenobiarch.
(Menologion of Basil II, 10th century).

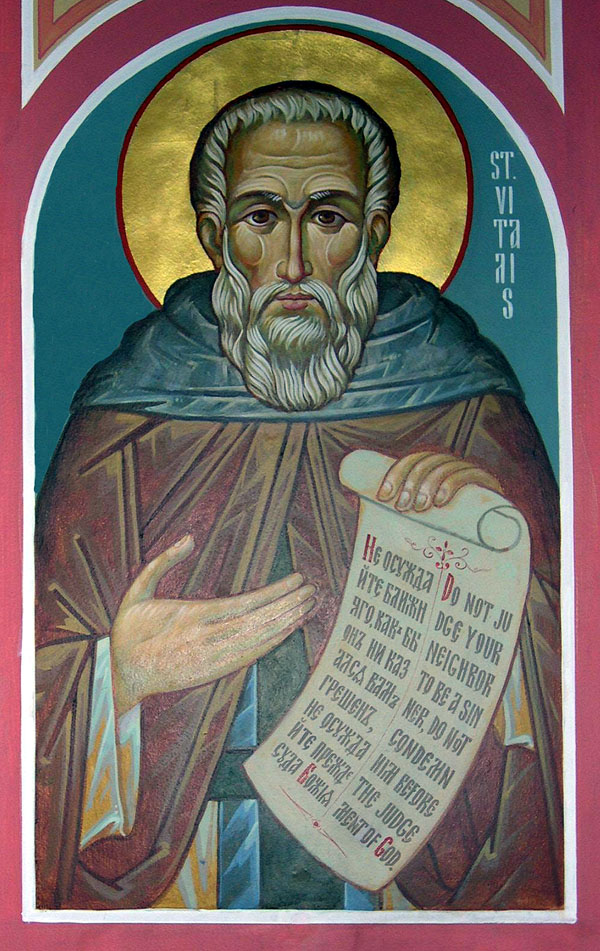
Saint Vitalis of Gaza.

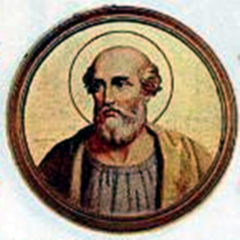
Hieromartyr Hyginus, Pope of Rome.

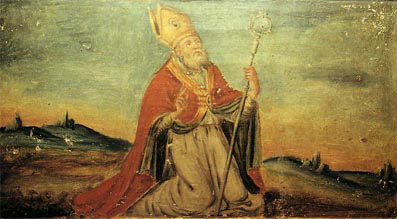
Saint Leucius of Brindisi.

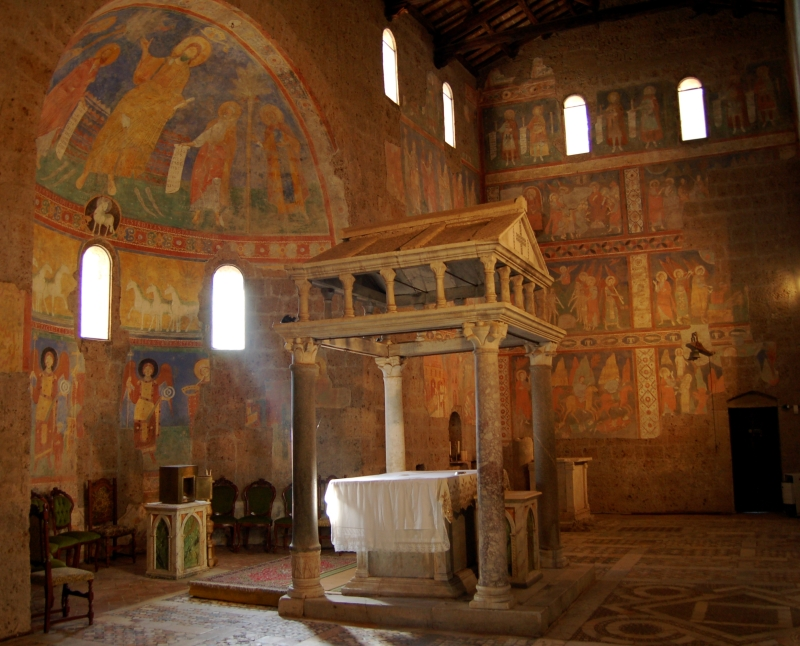
Interior of the Basilica di Sant'Elia, where Saint Anastasius was Abbot.

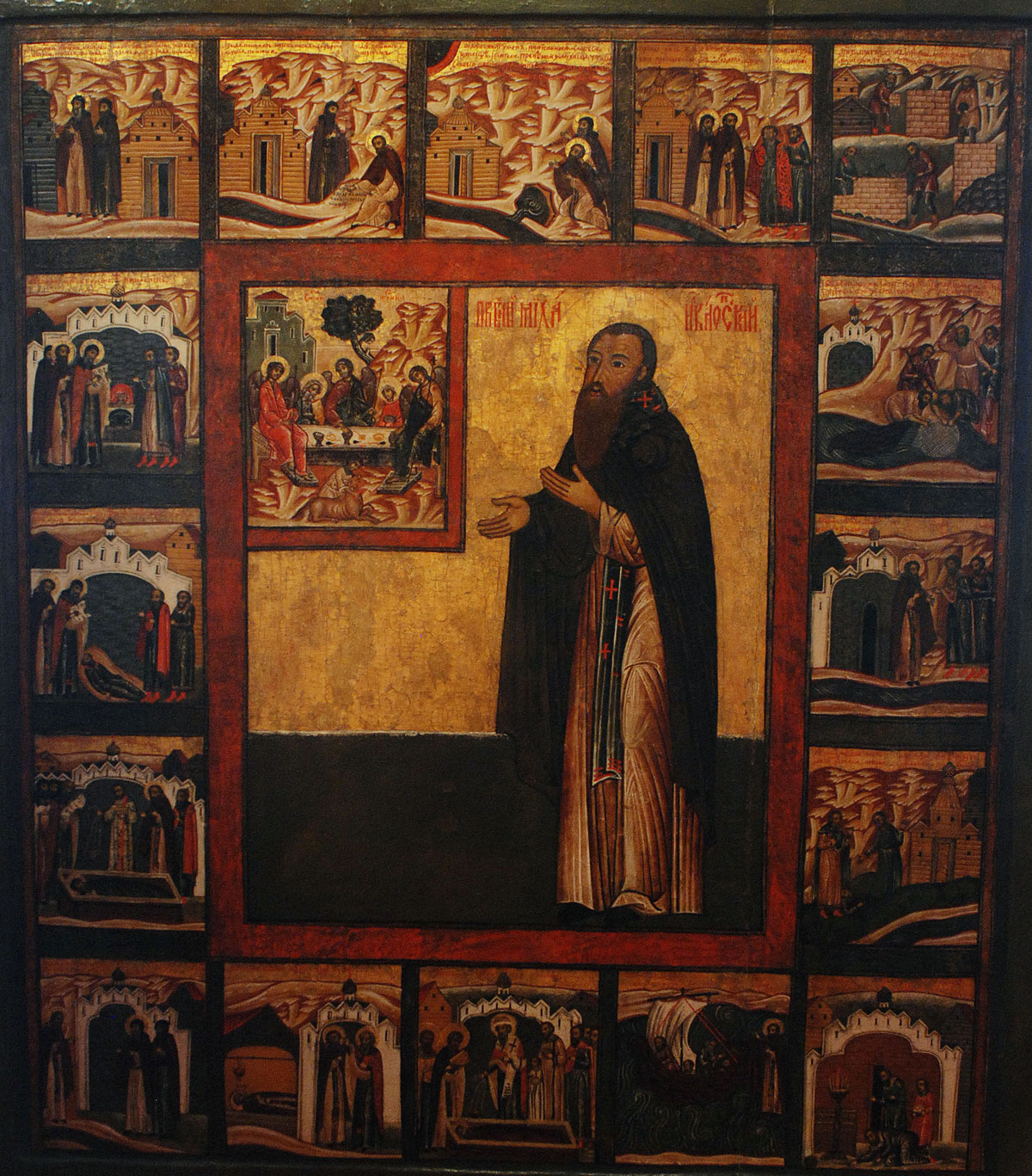
Icon of St. Michael of Klopsk.

New Hieroconfessor Vladimir Khirasko, Archpriest of Minsk.

Chernigov-Eletskaya Icon of the Mother of God.

== Sources ==
- January 11/January 24. Orthodox Calendar (PRAVOSLAVIE.RU).
- January 24 / January 11. HOLY TRINITY RUSSIAN ORTHODOX CHURCH (A parish of the Patriarchate of Moscow).
- January 11. OCA - The Lives of the Saints.
- The Autonomous Orthodox Metropolia of Western Europe and the Americas (ROCOR). St. Hilarion Calendar of Saints for the year of our Lord 2004. St. Hilarion Press (Austin, TX). p. 7.
- January 11. Latin Saints of the Orthodox Patriarchate of Rome.
- The Roman Martyrology. Transl. by the Archbishop of Baltimore. Last Edition, According to the Copy Printed at Rome in 1914. Revised Edition, with the Imprimatur of His Eminence Cardinal Gibbons. Baltimore: John Murphy Company, 1916. pp. 11–12.

Greek Sources

- Great Synaxaristes: (in Greek) 11 ΙΑΝΟΥΑΡΙΟΥ. ΜΕΓΑΣ ΣΥΝΑΞΑΡΙΣΤΗΣ.
- (in Greek) Συναξαριστής. 11 Ιανουαρίου. ECCLESIA.GR. (H ΕΚΚΛΗΣΙΑ ΤΗΣ ΕΛΛΑΔΟΣ).

Russian Sources

- (in Russian) 24 января (11 января). Православная Энциклопедия под редакцией Патриарха Московского и всея Руси Кирилла (электронная версия). (Orthodox Encyclopedia - Pravenc.ru).
- (in Russian) 11 января (ст.ст.) 24 января 2013 (нов. ст.). Русская Православная Церковь Отдел внешних церковных связей. (DECR).
