= Leucius of Brindisi =

Missionary and martyr

Saint Leucius of Brindisi
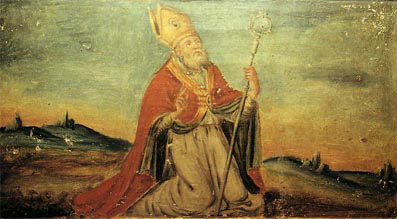
- Depiction of St Leucius in the Cathedral of Benevento, by Oronzo Tiso

Martyr and Bishop of Brindisi
- Born: Early 2nd century Location Unknown, believed to be Eastern Europe
- Died: 180
- Venerated in: Roman Catholic Church, Orthodox Church
- Canonized: Pre-congregation
- Major shrine: Benevento
- Feast: 11 January (Roman Catholic Church), (Orthodox Church)
- Attributes: Pastoral Staff
- Patronage: Atessa, Brindisi

Saint Leucius was initially a missionary from Alexandria, Egypt, who later founded the Diocese of Brindisi as the first bishop in 165. It is believed that he later became a martyr in 180.

== Early life ==
Not much is known of Leucius' early life, although it is believed that he was born in Eastern Europe, to Eudecius and Euphrodisia and was given the name of Eupressius at birth. What is known is that the young Eupressius was educated and spent the formative years of his life in Alexandria, Egypt. Following the death of his mother, he entered monastic life. After a heavenly vision during the Feast of the Assumption of the Virgin his name changed from Eupressius to Leucius. Having already been ordained a bishop, Leucius wanted to undertake a missionary apostolate in Brindisi, to liberate the pagans there from misconceptions of Christianity. Leucius left Alexandria for Brindisi, which at the time was one of the largest ports of the Mediterranean, in what is now the southern part of Italy.

== Religious life ==
Leucius first came to fame when many pagans in Apulia heard him preaching the Gospel during a drought. He claimed that if they had faith in his message, the rains would come. After the rains fell, the pagans who had heard Leucius were immediately converted to Christianity. Soon after, he became the first Bishop of Brindisi and proceeded to build the churches of St. Mary's and St. John the Baptist. The later part of his life is unknown, but according to tradition he suffered martyrdom in the year 180. Soon after his death his remains were returned to Brindisi, where they remained until the Lombard invasion of 768.

== Veneration ==
The cult of St. Leucius spread throughout the region of Apulia (where many of the rural parishes still bear his name), and he became much venerated in Trani, Lecce, Benevento, Caserta, and Capua. The spread of the cult of Saint Leucius in southern Italy came to coincide with the official conversion to Christianity of the Lombard Duchy of Benevento, Brindisi, which is believed to be attributed to Saint Barbato, in 680 and to the Duchess Teoderada in 706. Later that century, the remains of Leucius, which had begun to attract the attention of many pilgrims, were transferred to Trani and placed in a chapel under the cathedral. Later they were transferred again to Benevento, the capital of the Duchy of Benevento. The cult of the saint spread throughout the region, even reaching Rome, where a monastery dedicated to him was constructed as early as the sixth century. In Atessa a legend grew around St. Leucius in which the Bishop of Brindisi killed a dragon that had long terrorized the people, and in witness of his work gave him one of the ribs.

Theodosius, bishop of Brindisi and Oria, succeeded in the late 9th century to retrieve parts of the relics of St. Leucius and placed them in a new basilica above the ancient martyrium from where they had been taken to Trani. In the Basilica Cathedral of Brindisi, which was dedicated in 1771, the altar which closes the left aisle preserves the relic of an arm of Leucius. A depiction of the saint on canvas by Oronzo Tiso (1726–1800) adorns the cathedral.

== Bibliography ==
- Pietro Degli Onofri, Vita di Santo Leucio, primo vescovo di Brindisi, Ed. Raimondi, Napoli 1789.
- E. Bove, Il lungo viaggio del beato Leucio, Ed. del Matese, 1990.
