= December 18 (Eastern Orthodox liturgics) =

Day in the Eastern Orthodox liturgical calendar

Eastern Orthodox liturgical calendar
December 17	December 18	December 19
December 18 O.S. ≍ December 31 N.S. December 18 N.S ≍ December 5 O.S.

An Eastern Orthodox cross

December 18 in Eastern Orthodox liturgical calendars is a feast day and a day of commemoration of saints and martyrs. Although some Orthodox churches use the Revised Julian Calendar and others use the traditional Julian calendar, the fixed commemorations for their respective December 18 are broadly the same, no matter which calendar is used. (Note: Despite the dates being the same, the days to which they refer typically differ by 13 days. The notation Old Style or O.S. is sometimes used to indicate a date in the traditional Julian Calendar (the "Old Calendar"). The notation New Style or N.S. indicates a date in the Revised Julian calendar (the "New Calendar").)

== Saints ==
- Living-Martyr Eubotius, at Cyzicus (320)
- Martyrs Phocas and Hermylus (Hermilas), by the sword.
- Hieromartyrs Zacchaeus the Deacon and Alphaeus the Reader, at Caesarea. (see also November 18)
- Hieromartyr Modestus I, Archbishop of Jerusalem (389) (Note: "Even though the existence of this St. Modestus seems doubtful, we have retained his commemoration here in accordance with the Greek tradition." "Contradictions between the evidence of ecclesiastical history and of the tradition of the Synaxarion led St. Nicodemus the Athonite to postulate the existence of two Saints Modestus of Jerusalem: Modestus I, the 4th-century hieromartyr now commemorated on 18 Dec. (16 Dec. according to some manuscripts), and Modestus II, known to historians as the substitute for Patriarch Zacharias during the Persian occupation in the 7th century, commemorated on 16 Dec. Since the name of Modestus I is absent from the lists of Bishops of Jerusalem until the 5th century, doubts have been expressed about whether he really existed: but in popular tradition, he is venerated as the protector of domestic animals.) (Note: "The parents of Saint Modestus, pious Christians from Sebaste in Asia Minor, died in prison during Maximian's persecution (c. 305) while their son was in his infancy... ...When he went on pilgrimage to Jerusalem, the doors of the Church of the Holy Sepulchre opened at his prayer, to the jubilation of the people who, at this sign, chose Modestus to be Archbishop of the Mother of the Churches and successor of Saint James... ...Such was his favor with God that not only did he heal the bodily and spiritual diseases of his faithful, but he also wrought countless miracles for their oxen and mules and other domestic animals. To this day, it is the custom on the feast of Saint Modestus to sprinkle byres, stables and even houses with holy water in order to secure his protection. It is said that, after many years full of miracles and of contests for virtue, Saint Modestus was handed over to the pagans by the Jews, and that he was beheaded after enduring numerous torments.") (see also December 16 - Modestus II (†634))
- Saint Florus, Bishop of Amisus (7th century)
- Saint Michael the Synkellos and Confessor at Constantinople (846)
- Saint Sophia the Wonderworker. (Note: (in Greek): Δὲν ἔχουμε καμία πληροφορία γιὰ τὴν ζωή της, μόνο τὸ δίστιχο: «Θεοῦ σοφίαν ἠγάπησε Σοφία, ὅθεν χάριν δέδεκτο καὶ τῶν θαυμάτων».)
- Venerable Nomon. (Note: His memory is referenced only briefly in the Small Euchologion, in the edition printed by the Apostoliki Diakonia in 1956, without any other information. He is probably a Saint of the Cypriot Church.)

== Pre-Schism Western saints ==
- Martyrs Rufus and Zosimus, at Philippi in Macedonia (c. 107) (Note: Citizens of Philippi brought to Rome with St. Ignatius of Antioch and thrown to the beasts in the Roman amphitheatre two days before the latter's martyrdom. According to the Roman Martyrology, they "were of the number of the disciples, by whom the primitive church was founded among the Jews and the Greeks. Their happy martyrdom is mentioned by St. Polycarp, in his epistle to the Philippians.")
- Martyr Moses (Moysetes), a martyr in North Africa who probably suffered under Decius (c. 250) (Note: "S. CORNELIUS, in his letter to Fabius of Antioch about Novatus, says that the heretic was excommunicated by "Moyses, the blessed witness who but lately endured a glorious and wonderful martyrdom, and who, whist yet among the living, seeing the audacity and folly of the man, excluded him from communion.")
- Martyrs Quintus, Simplicius and Companions, in North Africa under the Emperors Decius and Valerian (c. 255)
- Martyrs Victurus, Victor, Victorinus, Adjutor, Quartus and 30 other companions, in North Africa.
- Martyr Sebastian, at Rome, and his companions:

- Martyrs Nicostratus, Zoe, Castorius, Tranquillinus, Marcellinus, Mark, Claudius, Symphorian, Victorinus, Tiburtius, and Castulus (287)

- Saint Gatianus, first Bishop of Tours (3rd century) (Note: He was venerated as a disciple of St. Dionysius of Paris and the first Bishop of Tours in France.)
- Saint Bodagisil, founded and was the first Abbot of a monastery on the Meuse in Belgium (588)
- Saint Samthann, foundress of the convent of Clonbroney in Co. Longford in Ireland (6th century)
- Saint Flannán, first Bishop of Killaloe, Ireland (7th century) (Note: He also worked in the Hebrides and elsewhere. He managed to recite the whole Psalter every day.)
- Saint Desiderius of Fontenelle (Desideratus), son of Saint Waningus (700) (Note: Son of St. Waningus, the founder of the monastery of Fécamp, he became a monk at Fontenelle in the north of France. His relics were enshrined in Ghent in Belgium.)
- Saint Winebald (Winibald), Abbot of the Benedictine double monastery of Heidenheim and Bishop of Eichstatt, Germany (761) (Note: Born in England, he was the brother of Sts Willibald and Walburgh. While on pilgrimage to the Holy Land with his brother Winebald, he was taken ill and remained in Rome. Eventually he returned to England and went to Germany where he became Abbot of Heidenheim and then Bishop of Eichstätt.)

== Post-Schism Orthodox saints ==
- Saint Daniil (Daniel) Sihastrul the Hesychast of Voroneț Monastery, Moldavia (15th century) (Note: He labored in asceticism in a Bukovina monastery and later settled in a secluded area. Many came to him, including the Moldovan ruler Stefan III. He refused an appointment to the See of Moldova and founded the Voronets Monastery.)
- Venerable Sebastian, Abbot of Poshekhonye Monastery, Vologda (1500) (Note: See: (in Russian) Севастиан Сохотский. Википедии. (Russian Wikipedia).)

=== New martyrs and confessors ===
- New Martyr Victor Matveev (1936)
- New Hieromartyr Thaddeus Uspensky, Archbishop of Tver (1937) (Note: See: (in Russian) Фаддей (Успенский). Википедии. (Russian Wikipedia).)
- New Hieromartyr Nicholas Klementiev, Archbishop of Great Ustiug (1937) (Note: See: (in Russian) Николай (Клементьев). Википедии. (Russian Wikipedia).)
- New Hieromartyrs (1937):
  - Andrew Voskresensky of Moscow,
  - John Mironsky of Chimkent,
  - Vladimir Preobrazhensky of Chimkent, and
  - Elias Benemansky of Tver, Priests (1937) (Note: See: (in Russian) Бенеманский, Илья Ильич. Википедии. (Russian Wikipedia).)
- New Hieromartyr Sergius Astakhov, Deacon (1942)
- New Virgin Martyr Vera Truks of Zhitomir (1942) (Note: See: (in Russian) Трукс, Вера Васильевна. Википедии. (Russian Wikipedia).)

== Other commemorations ==
- Consecration of the Church of the Theotokos in Chalkoprateia
- Synaxis of the Holy Family of Saint Gregory Palamas (14th century)
- Glorification (1694) of Righteous Simeon, Wonderworker of Verkhoturye (1642)
- Second Finding of the Wonderworking Icon of Panagia Evangelistria of Tinos (1842) (see also: January 30)
- Repose of Schemanun Nazaria, Eldress of Văratec Monastery, Romania (1814)
- Repose of Metropolitan Benjamin Costachi of Moldavia (1846)
- Slaying of Hieromonk Nestor of Zharki, Ivanovo Oblast (1993)

== Gallery ==
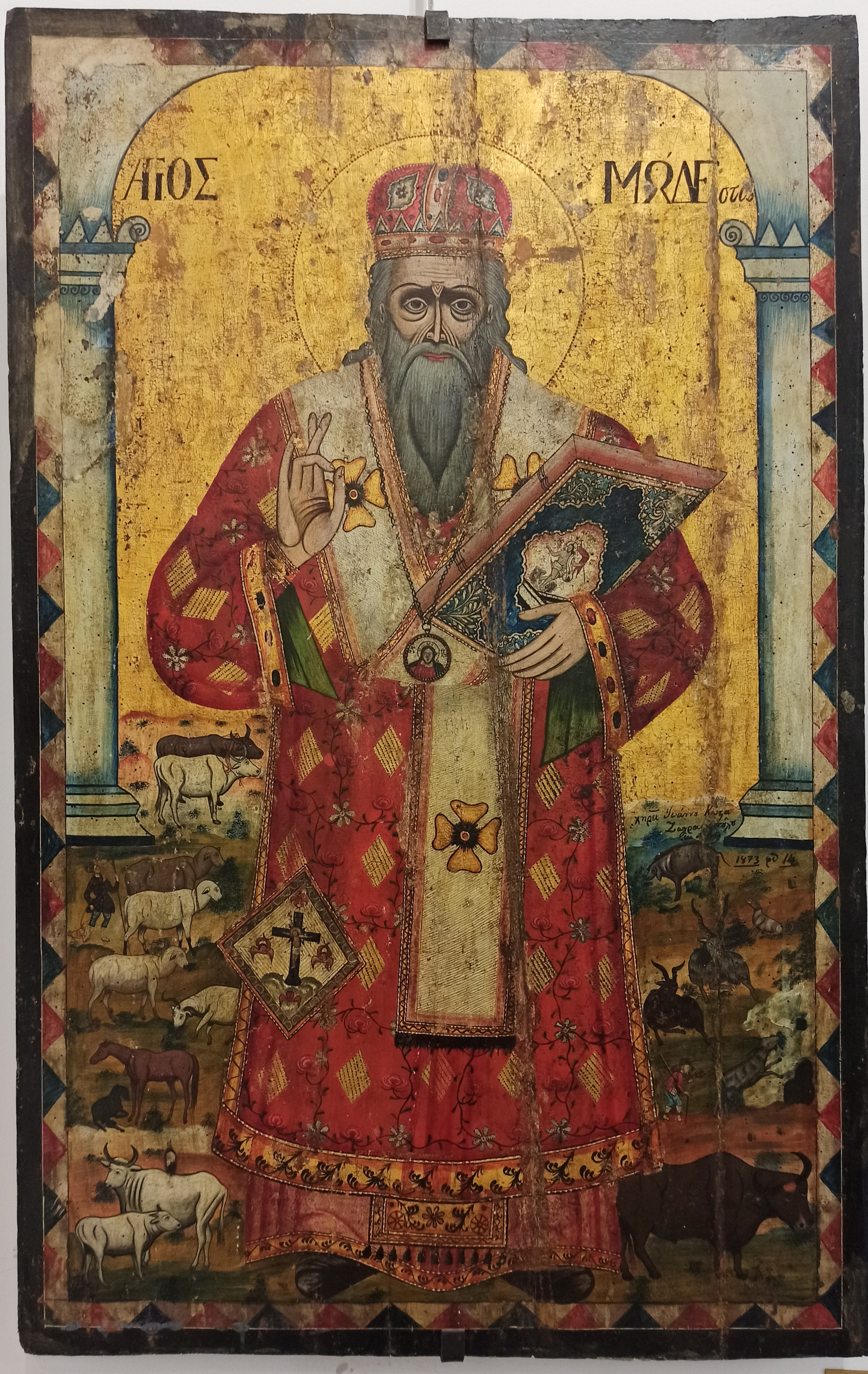
Hieromartyr Modestus I, Archbishop of Jerusalem.

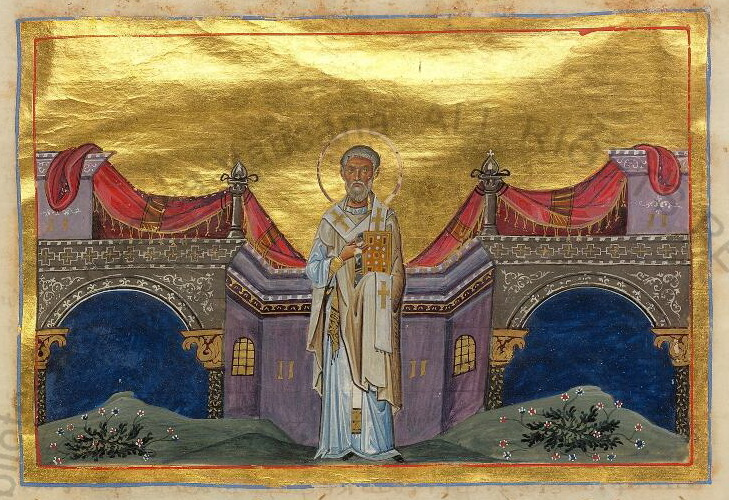
St. Florus, Bishop of Amisus.
(Menologion of Basil II, 10th century).

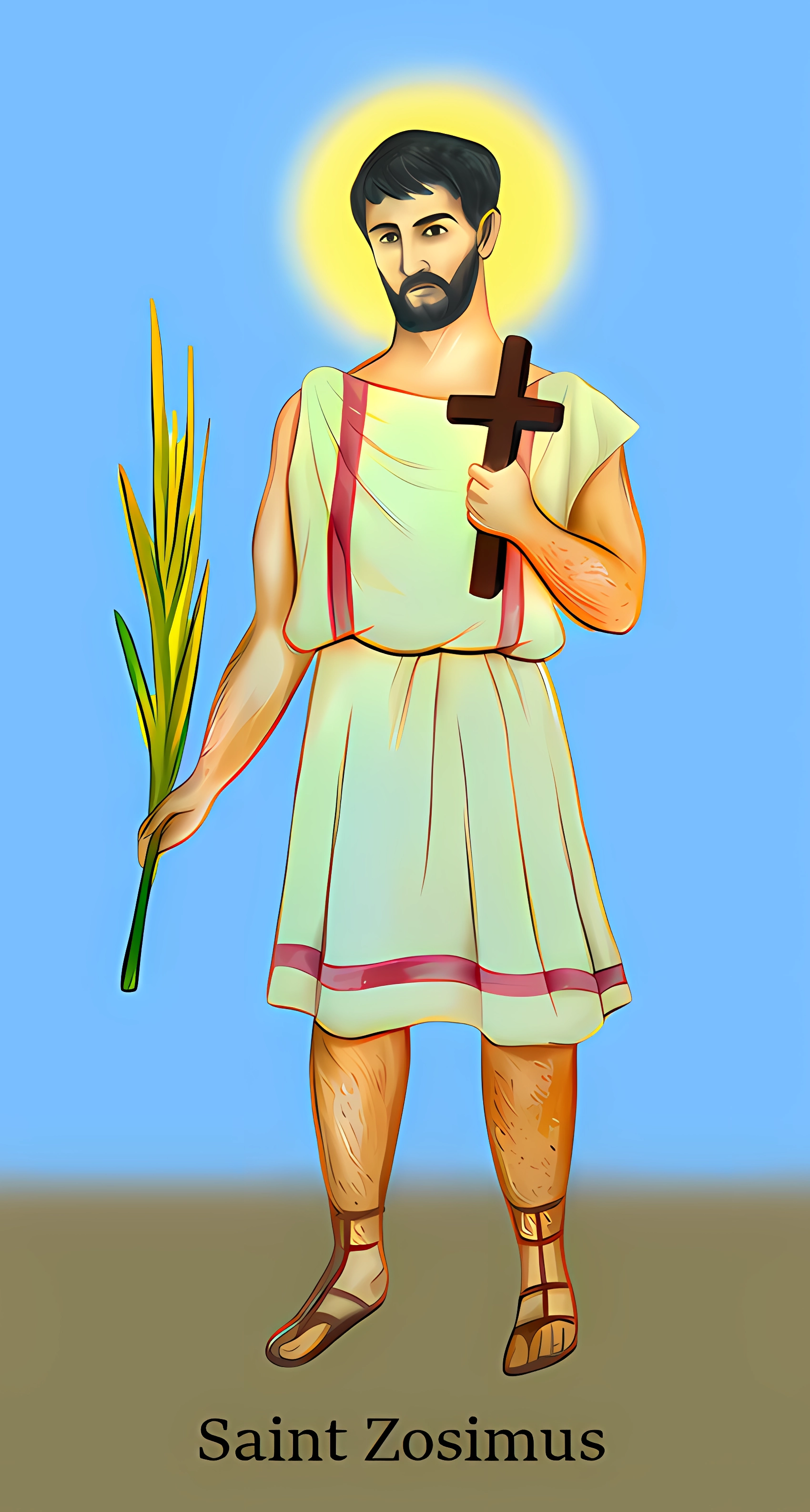
Martyr Zosimus.

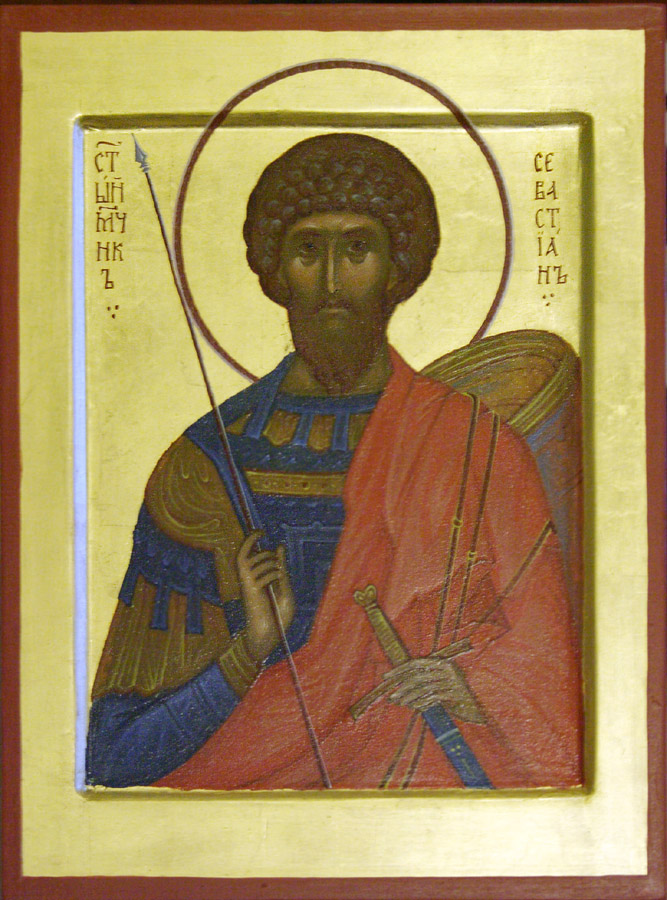
St. Sebastian.

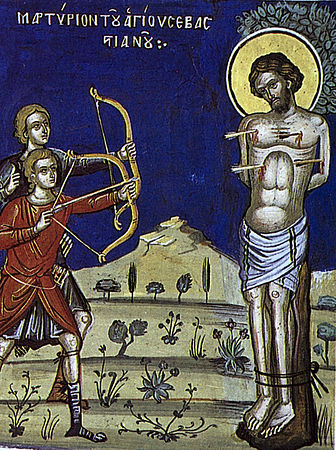
St. Sebastian and the arrows.

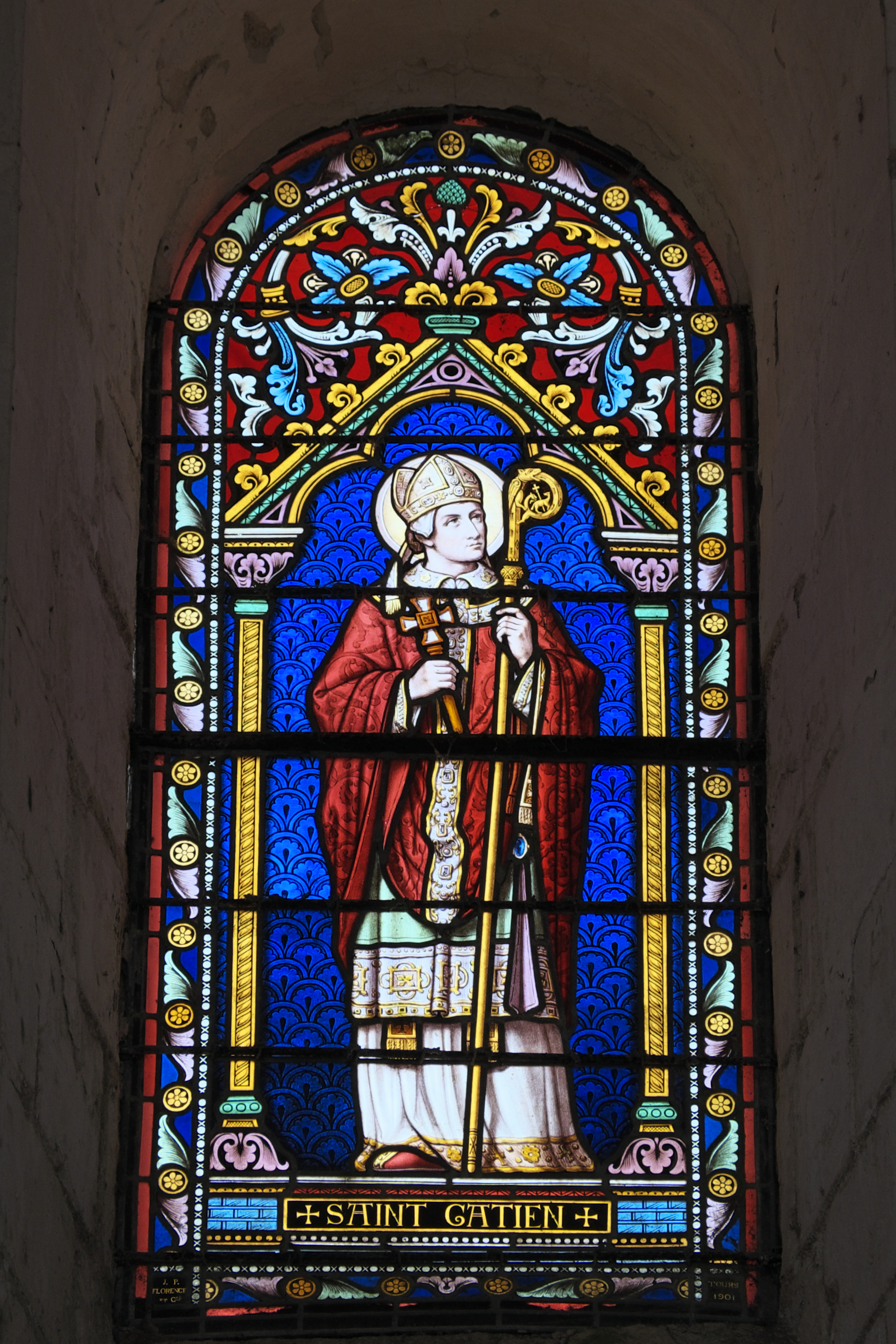
St. Gatianus, first Bishop of Tours.

St. Flannán, first Bishop of Killaloe.

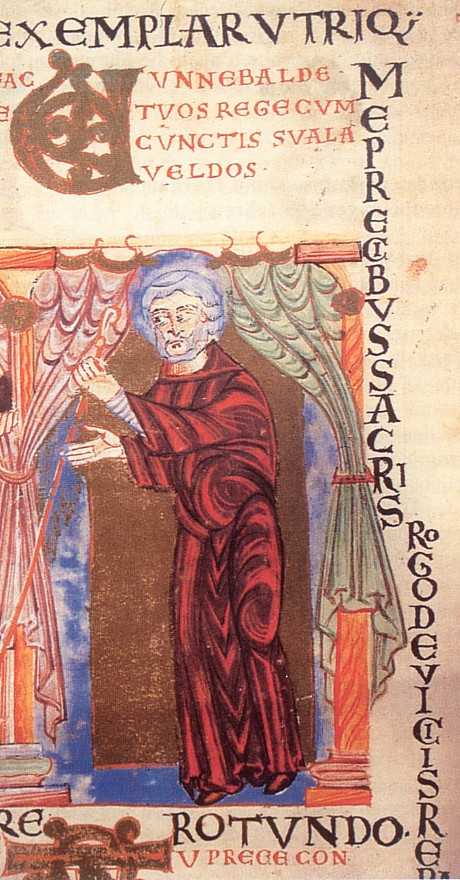
St. Winebald, Abbot of Heidenheim and Bishop of Eichstatt.

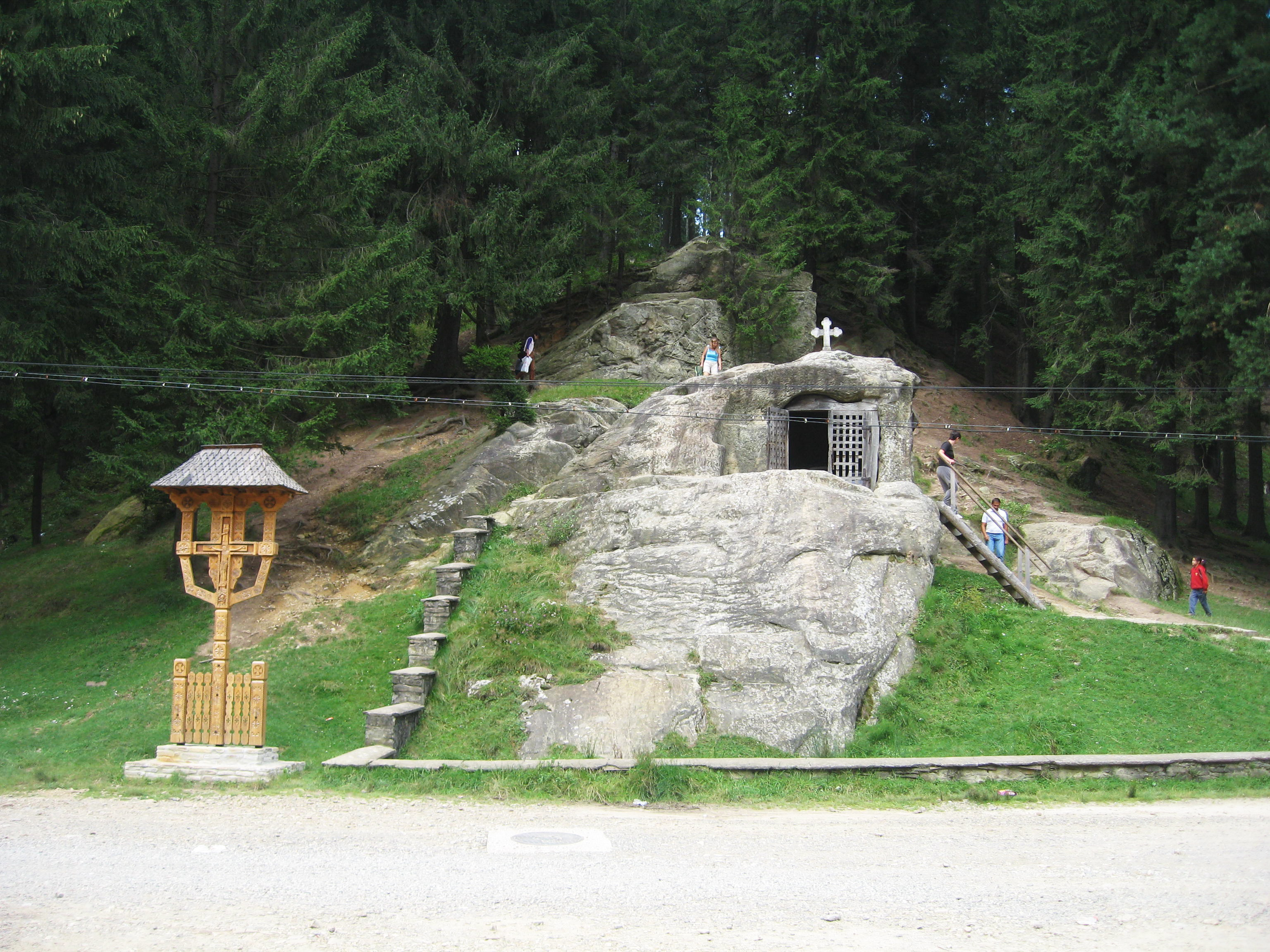
Cell of St. Daniel the Hesychast (Daniil Sihastrul).

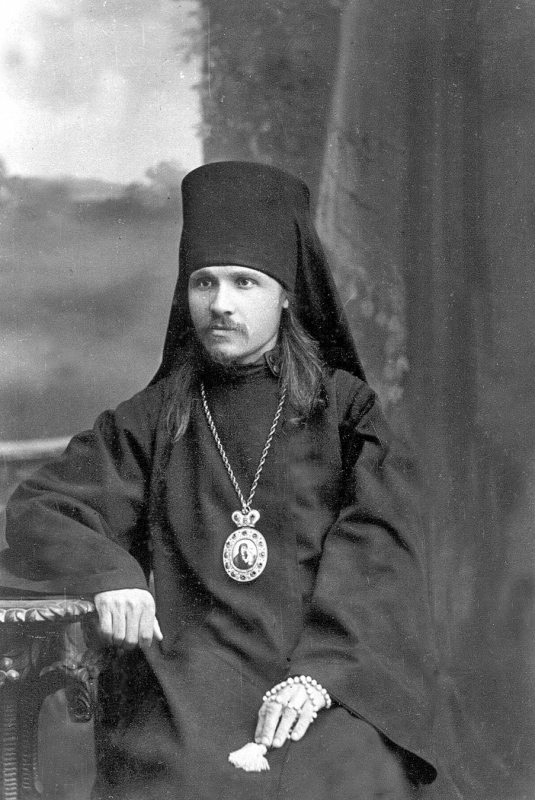
New Hieromartyr Thaddeus Uspensky, Archbishop of Tver.

New Hieromartyr Nicholas Klementiev, Archbishop of Great Ustiug.

New Hieromartyr Elias Benemansky of Tver, Priest.

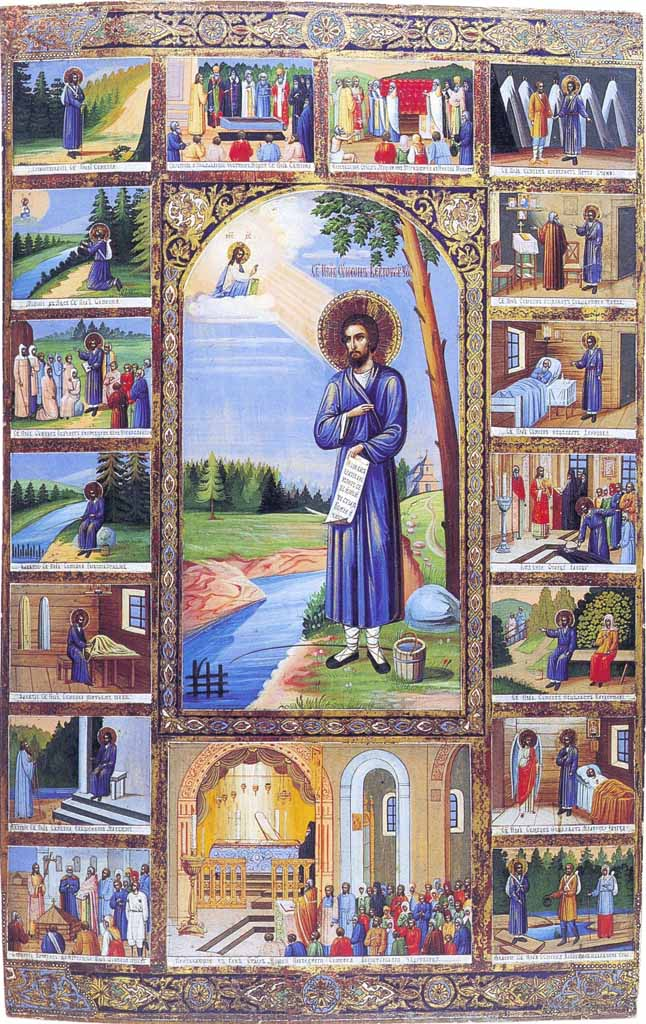
St. Simeon, Wonderworker of Verkhoturye.

== Sources ==
- December 18/31. Orthodox Calendar (PRAVOSLAVIE.RU).
- December 31 / December 18. HOLY TRINITY RUSSIAN ORTHODOX CHURCH (A parish of the Patriarchate of Moscow).
- December 18. OCA - The Lives of the Saints.
- The Autonomous Orthodox Metropolia of Western Europe and the Americas (ROCOR). St. Hilarion Calendar of Saints for the year of our Lord 2004. St. Hilarion Press (Austin, TX). p. 94.
- December 18. Latin Saints of the Orthodox Patriarchate of Rome.
- The Roman Martyrology. Transl. by the Archbishop of Baltimore. Last Edition, According to the Copy Printed at Rome in 1914. Revised Edition, with the Imprimatur of His Eminence Cardinal Gibbons. Baltimore: John Murphy Company, 1916.

Greek Sources

- Great Synaxaristes: (in Greek) 18 ΔΕΚΕΜΒΡΙΟΥ. ΜΕΓΑΣ ΣΥΝΑΞΑΡΙΣΤΗΣ.
- (in Greek) Συναξαριστής. 18 Δεκεμβρίου. ECCLESIA.GR. (H ΕΚΚΛΗΣΙΑ ΤΗΣ ΕΛΛΑΔΟΣ).

Russian Sources

- (in Russian) 31 декабря (18 декабря). Православная Энциклопедия под редакцией Патриарха Московского и всея Руси Кирилла (электронная версия). (Orthodox Encyclopedia - Pravenc.ru).
- (in Russian) 18 декабря (ст.ст.) 31 декабря 2014 (нов. ст.). Русская Православная Церковь Отдел внешних церковных связей. (DECR).
