= Zharki =

Zharki (Russian: Жарки) is the name of several rural localities in Russia.

== Chelyabinsk Oblast ==
As of 2012, one rural locality in Chelyabinsk Oblast bears this name:

- Zharki, Chelyabinsk Oblast, a village in Berezovsky Selsoviet of Krasnoarmeysky District

== Ivanovo Oblast ==
As of 2012, two rural localities in Ivanovo Oblast bear this name:

- Zharki, Savinsky District, Ivanovo Oblast, a village in Savinsky District
- Zharki, Yuryevetsky District, Ivanovo Oblast, a selo in Yuryevetsky District

== Kostroma Oblast ==
As of 2012, two rural localities in Kostroma Oblast bear this name:

- Zharki, Galichsky District, Kostroma Oblast, a village in Dmitriyevskoye Settlement of Galichsky District; 58°10′N 42°10′E
- Zharki, Sudislavsky District, Kostroma Oblast, a village in Raslovskoye Settlement of Sudislavsky District; 57°55′N 41°24′E

== Novgorod Oblast ==
As of 2012, two rural localities in Novgorod Oblast bear this name:

- Zharki, Pestovsky District, Novgorod Oblast, a village in Laptevskoye Settlement of Pestovsky District
- Zharki, Volotovsky District, Novgorod Oblast, a village in Gorskoye Settlement of Volotovsky District

== Pskov Oblast ==
As of 2012, five rural localities in Pskov Oblast bear this name:

- Zharki, Loknyansky District, Pskov Oblast, a village in Loknyansky District
- Zharki, Opochetsky District, Pskov Oblast, a village in Opochetsky District
- Zharki, Porkhovsky District, Pskov Oblast, a village in Porkhovsky District
- Zharki, Pskovsky District, Pskov Oblast, a village in Pskovsky District
- Zharki, Pushkinogorsky District, Pskov Oblast, a village in Pushkinogorsky District

== Vladimir Oblast ==
As of 2012, one rural locality in Vladimir Oblast bears this name:

- Zharki, Vladimir Oblast, a village in Sudogodsky District

== Vologda Oblast ==
As of 2012, one rural locality in Vologda Oblast bears this name:

- Zharki, Vologda Oblast, a village in Shalimovsky Selsoviet of Cherepovetsky District

== Yaroslavl Oblast ==
As of 2012, two rural localities in Yaroslavl Oblast bear this name:

- Zharki, Nekouzsky District, Yaroslavl Oblast, a village in Novinsky Rural Okrug of Nekouzsky District
- Zharki, Tutayevsky District, Yaroslavl Oblast, a village in Borisoglebsky Rural Okrug of Tutayevsky District
