= December 16 (Eastern Orthodox liturgics) =

Day in the Eastern Orthodox liturgical calendar

Eastern Orthodox liturgical calendar
| December 15 | December 16 | December 17 |
December 16 O.S. ≍ December 29 N.S. December 16 N.S ≍ December 3 O.S.

An Eastern Orthodox cross

December 16 in Eastern Orthodox liturgical calendars is a feast day and a day of commemoration of saints and martyrs. Although some Orthodox churches use the Revised Julian Calendar and others use the traditional Julian calendar, the fixed commemorations for their respective December 16 are broadly the same, no matter which calendar is used. (Note: Despite the dates being the same, the days to which they refer typically differ by 13 days. The notation Old Style or O.S. is sometimes used to indicate a date in the traditional Julian Calendar (the "Old Calendar"). The notation New Style or N.S. indicates a date in the Revised Julian calendar (the "New Calendar").)

== Saints ==
- Prophet Haggai (Aggaeus) (500 BC) (see also: December 4, July 4)
- Martyr Marinus of Rome (283)
- Martyrs Promus (Probus) and Hilarion (Hilary), by the sword. (Note: They may be the same commemorated in December 19. (Elias + Ares = Hilary?))
- Saint Memnon, Archbishop of Ephesus (c. 440) (Note: Certain Synaxaria mistakenly refer to him as the Bishop of Jerusalem.)
- Saint Modestus II, Patriarch of Jerusalem (634) (Note: Greek use: at Jerusalem.) (Note: "When the Persian King Chosroes II was advancing on Jerusalem in 614, Patriarch Zacharias sent Modestus through the enemy lines to ask help of the imperial forces stationed at Antioch. The Holy City fell to the Persians after a three-week siege and, for three days, was thoroughly pillaged and was the scene of dreadful massacres. As the holy Patriarch Zacharias (21 Feb.), along with the Holy Cross and thousands of Christians, had been deported to Persia, Modestus was chosen to succeed him in the still smouldering city. Braving death at every moment, the Saint, like a second Zerubbabel, saw to the burying of the tens of thousands of victims and to the cleansing of the devastated and profaned sanctuaries and holy places. He brought together, consoled and gave hope to the survivors, and thanks to unstinted aid from Saint John the Merciful, the Patriarch of Alexandria (12 Nov.), he was able to restore life to the afflicted Church of Sion, bereft of all resource.") (see also December 18 - Modestus I († 389))
- Saint Simeon (Symeon) I, Patriarch of Antioch (834-840) (Note: His memory is recorded in the Synaxarion of Delahaye, p. 361, 53, together with that of St. Memnon, Archbishop of Ephesus.)
- Blessed Empress Theophano Martinakia the Wonderworker (893), wife of Byzantine Emperor Leo VI the Wise
- Saint Nicholas II Chrysoberges (Chrysovergis), Ecumenical Patriarch of Constantinople (995)

== Pre-Schism Western saints ==
- Martyrs Valentine, Concordius, Navalis and Agricola, martyrs venerated in Ravenna in Italy (c. 305) (Note: "At Ravenna, the holy martyrs Valentine, military officer, Concordius, his son, Navalis, and Agricola, who suffered for Christ in the persecution of Maximian.")
- Women Martyrs of North-West Africa, a great number of women martyred under Hunneric, Arian King of the Vandals (482) (Note: "In Africa, many holy virgins, who reached a happy termination of their martyrdom in the persecution of the Vandals, under the Arian king Hunneric, by having heavy weights tied to them, and burning plates of metal applied to their bodies.")
- Saint Dabheog (Beoc, Beanus, Mobeoc), founder of a monastery on an island in Lough Derg in Donegal in Ireland (5th century)
- Saint Ado of Vienne (875) (Note: Born in Burgundy in France, he became a monk at Prüm near Trier in Germany. From here he travelled to Rome. On his return he became Bishop of Vienne and was an excellent bishop. He is remembered for the martyrology which bears his name.)
- Saint Adelaide of Italy, daughter of the King of Burgundy, she was married to Lothair II of Italy, became a nun (999) (Note: She was rescued from brutality after his death by Otto the Great who married her. Widowed again, she was maltreated by her son and daughter-in-law. In old age she became the regent of the Empire. At the end of her life she became a nun.)

== Post-Schism Orthodox saints ==
- Venerable Sophia (Solomonia) Saburova of Suzdal, the Wonderworker, Nun, wife of Grand Duke Basil III of Moscow (1542)
- Saint John Rastorguyev the Barefoot, Fool-for-Christ, of Kiev (1849)

=== New martyrs and confessors ===
- New Hieromartyr Vladimir Alexeyev, Priest of Okhansk (1918)
- New Hieromartyr Arcadius Ostalsky, Bishop of Bezhetsk (1937) (Note: See: (in Russian) Аркадий (Остальский). Википедии. (Russian Wikipedia.))
- New Hieromartyr Alexander Kolokolov, Protopresbyter of Tver (1937)
- New Hieromartyr Paul Favoritov, Priest of Tver (1937)
- New Hieromartyr Macarius Smirnov, Priest-monk of Tver (1937) (Note: See: (in Russian) Макарий (Смирнов). Википедии. (Russian Wikipedia).)
- New Hieromartyr Peter Zinoviev, Priest of Tver (1937) (Note: See: (in Russian) Зиновьев, Пётр Константинович. Википедии. (Russian Wikipedia).)
- New Hieromartyr Theodosius Boldiriev, Priest of Tver (1937) (Note: See: (in Russian) Болдырев, Феодосий Фёдорович. Википедии. (Russian Wikipedia).)
- New Hieromartyrs Priests Elias Cheredeev, and Vladimir Damaskinus (1937) (Note: See: (in Russian) Дамаскин, Владимир Николаевич. Википедии. (Russian Wikipedia).)

== Other commemorations ==
- Sunday of the Holy Forefathers of Jesus Christ (December 11–17)

== Icon gallery ==
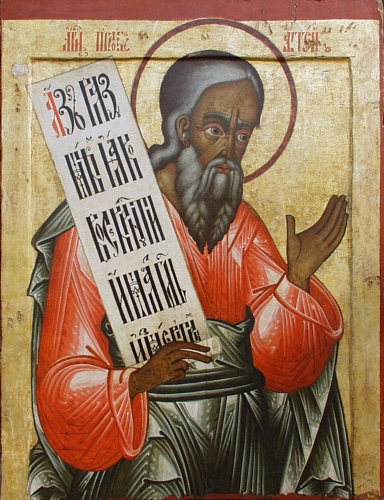
Prophet Haggai, Russian icon from first quarter of 18th century.

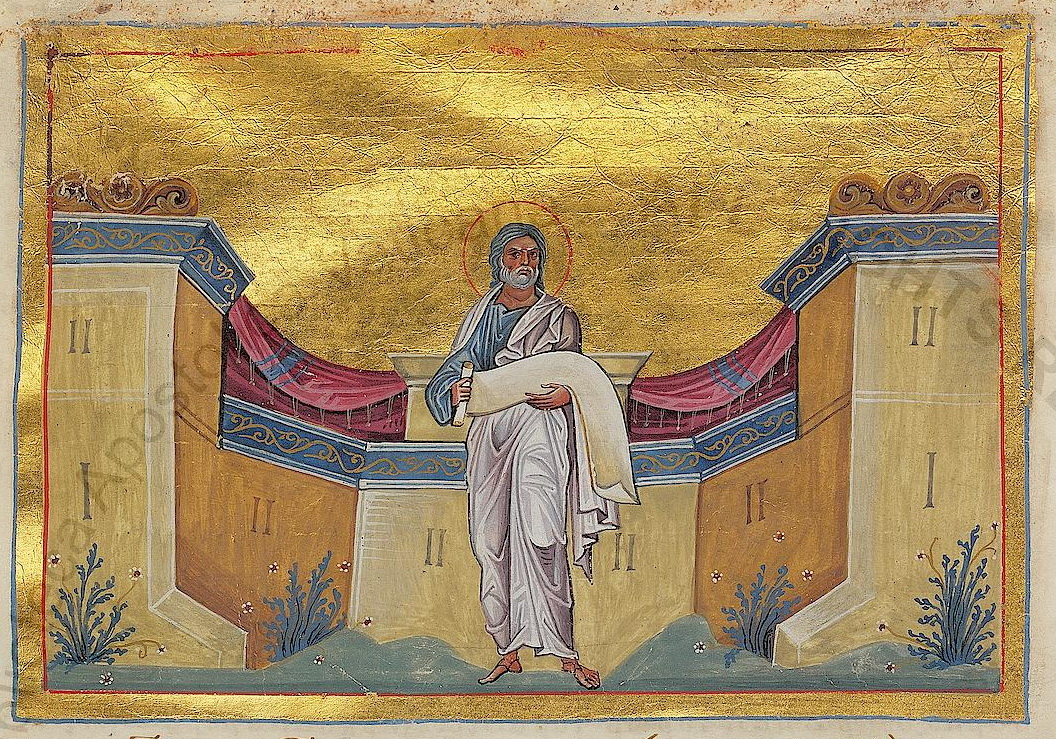
Prophet Haggai.
(Menologion of Basil II, 10th century).

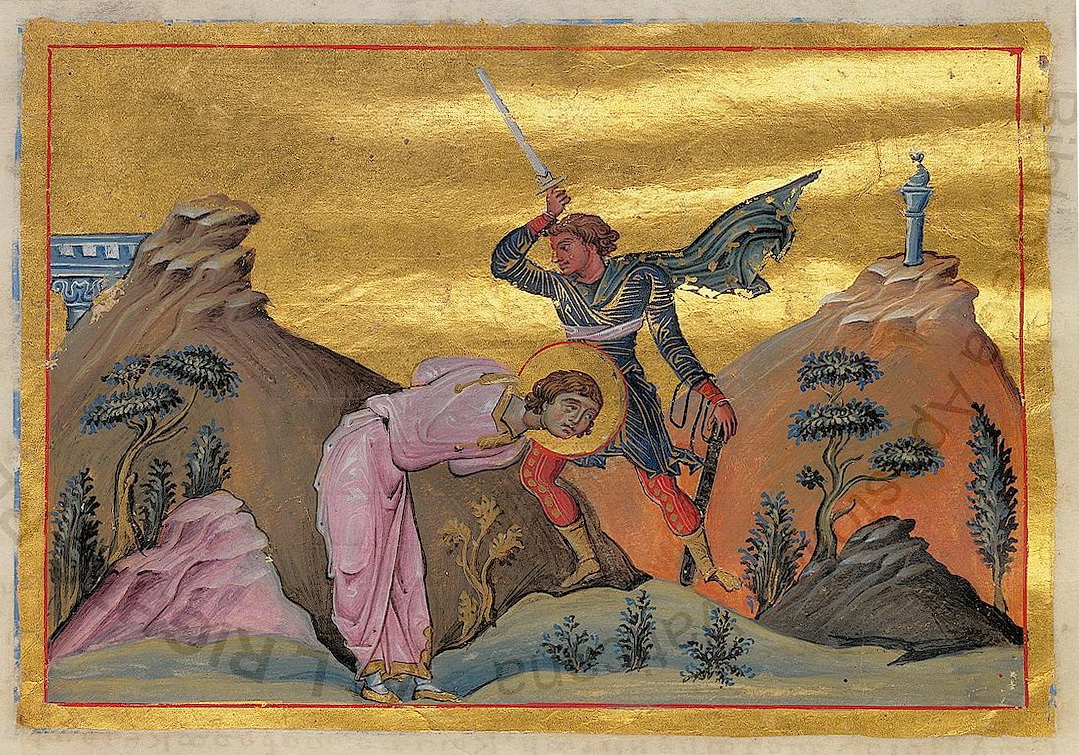
Martyr Marinus of Rome.
(Menologion of Basil II, 10th century).

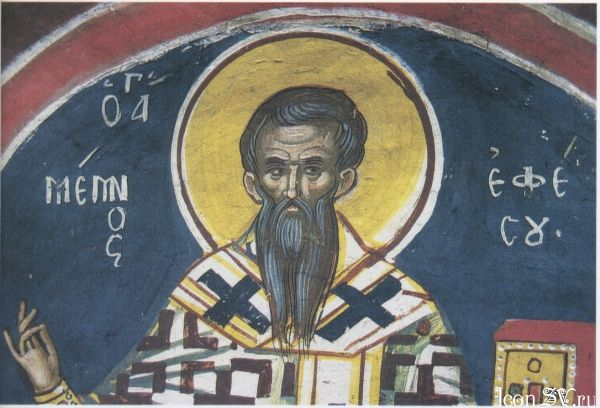
St. Memnon, Archbishop of Ephesus.

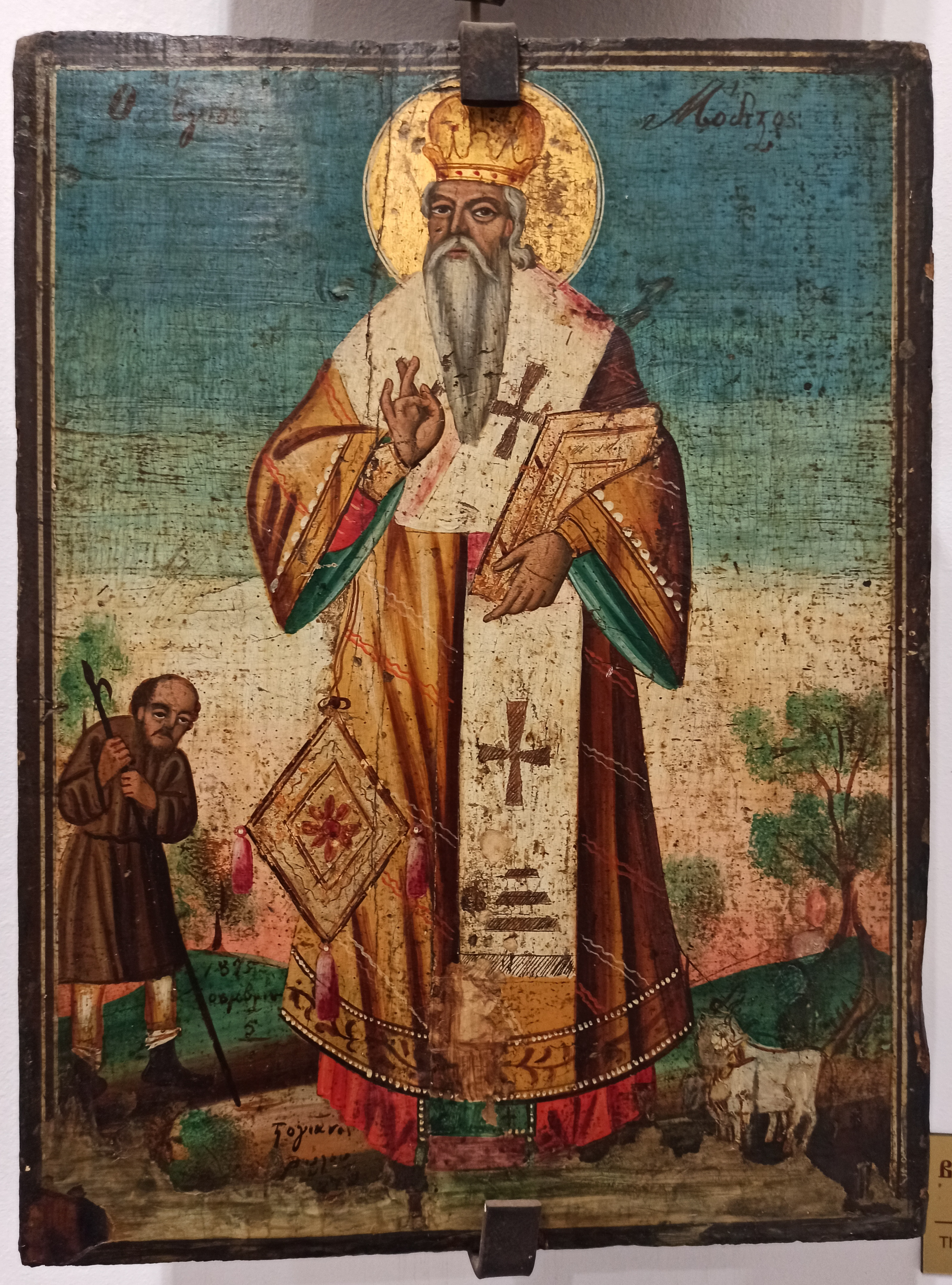
St. Modestus II, Patriarch of Jerusalem.

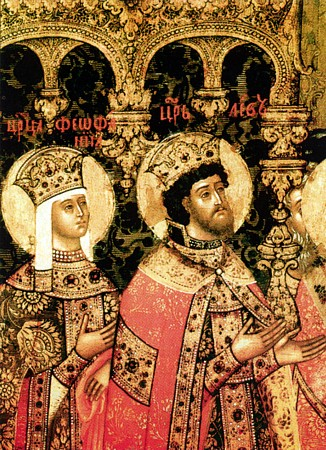
St. Theophano and her husband the emperor Leo VI the Wise.

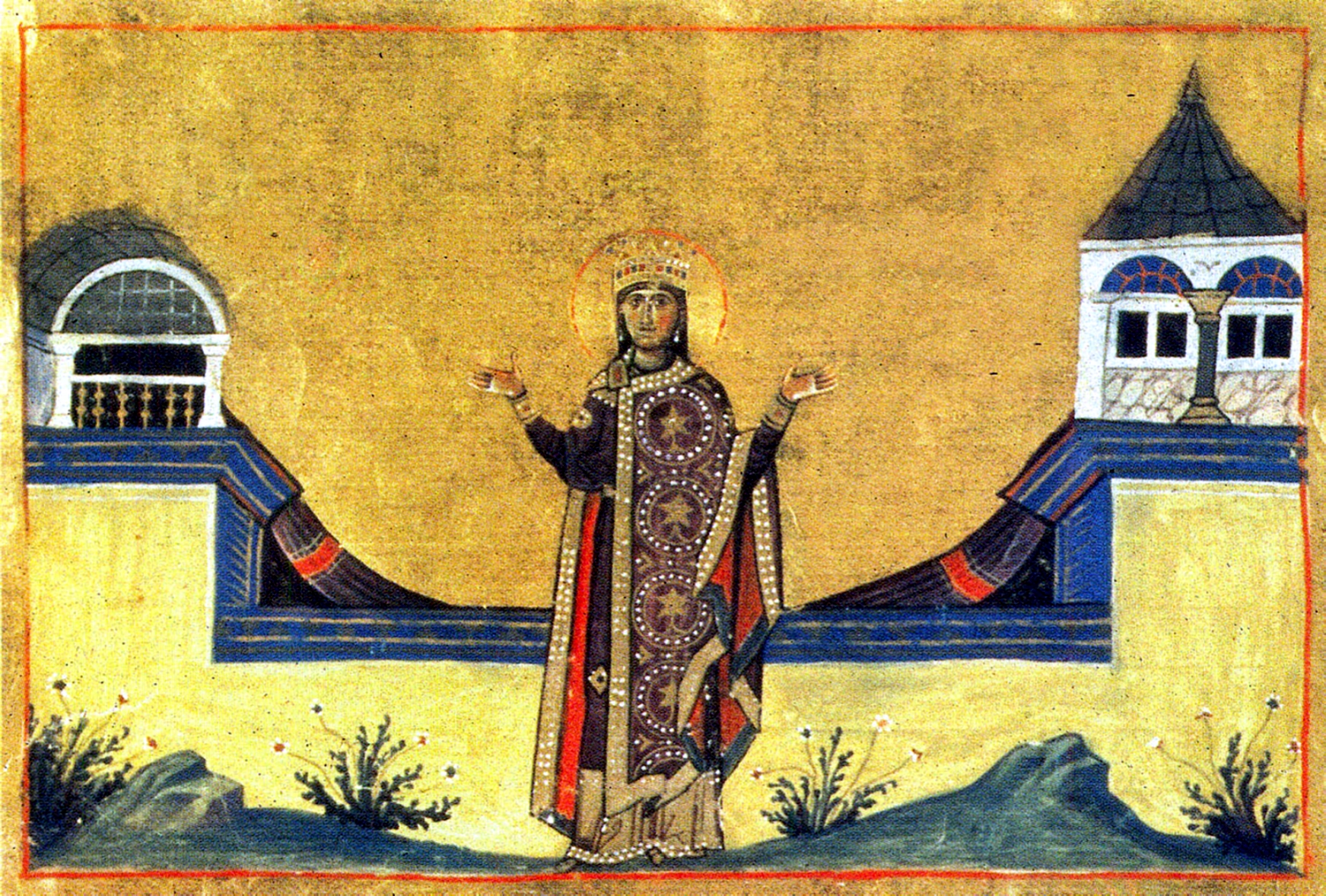
Saint Theophano
(Menologion of Basil II, 10th century).

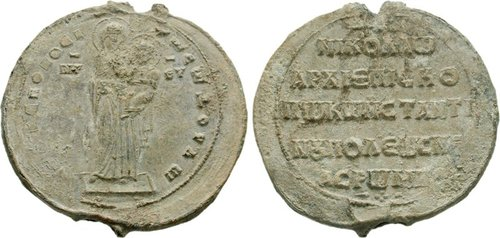
Seal of Patriarch Nicholas II Chrysoberges.

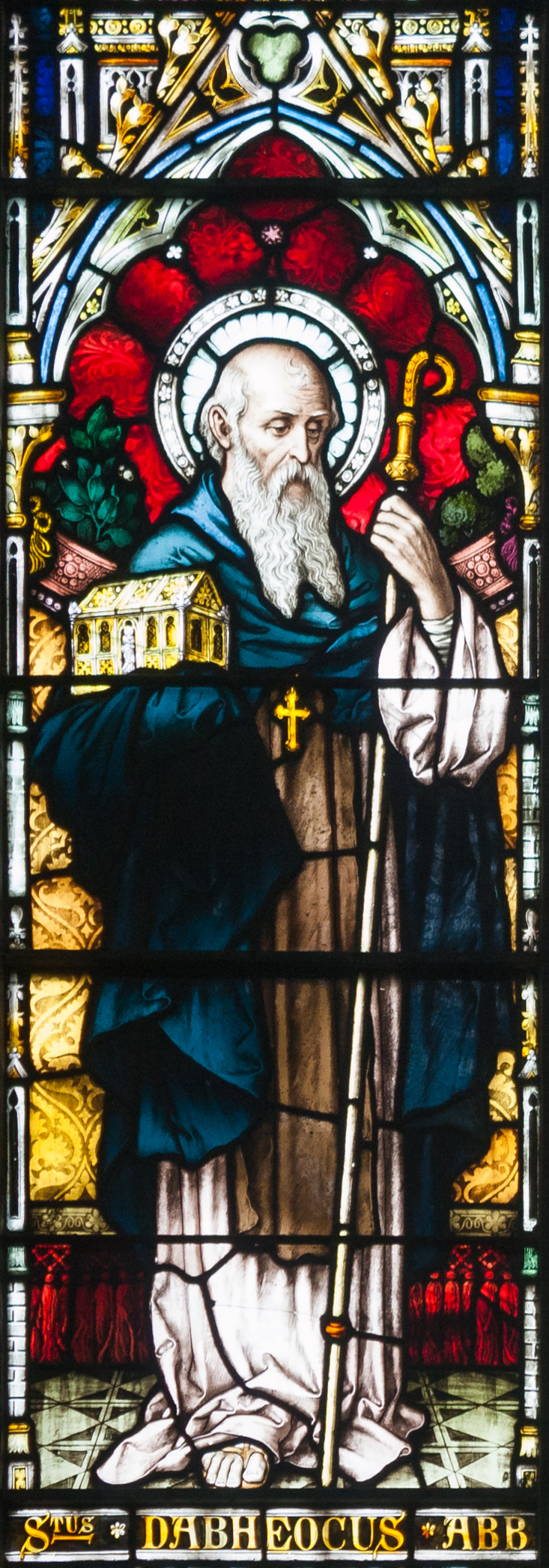
St. Dabheog, founder of a monastery on an island in Lough Derg, Donegal.

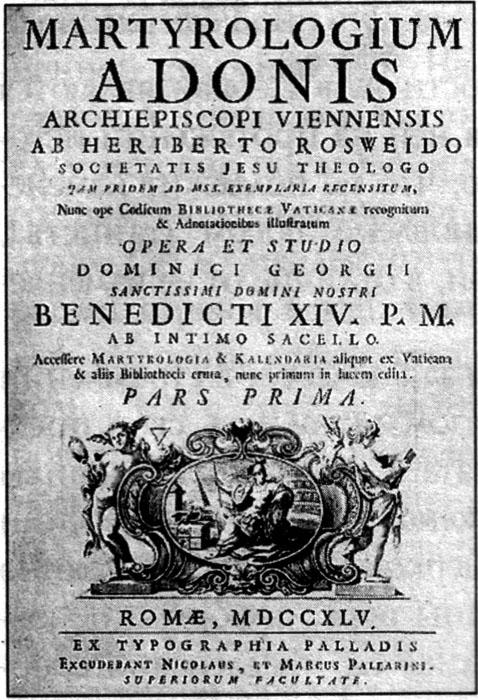
First Page of Martyrologium of Ado Viennensis. Edition: Rome, 1745.

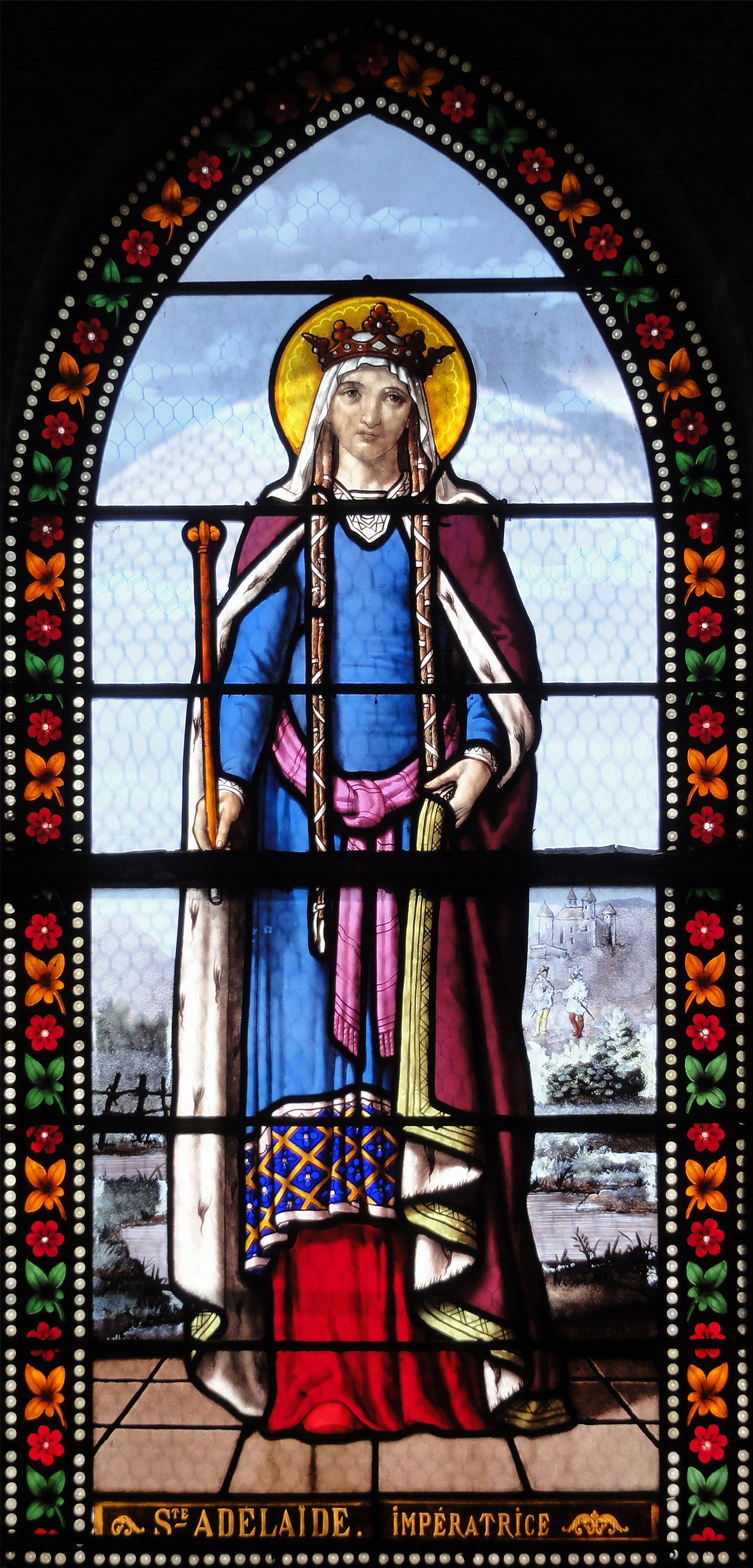
Saint Adelaide of Italy.

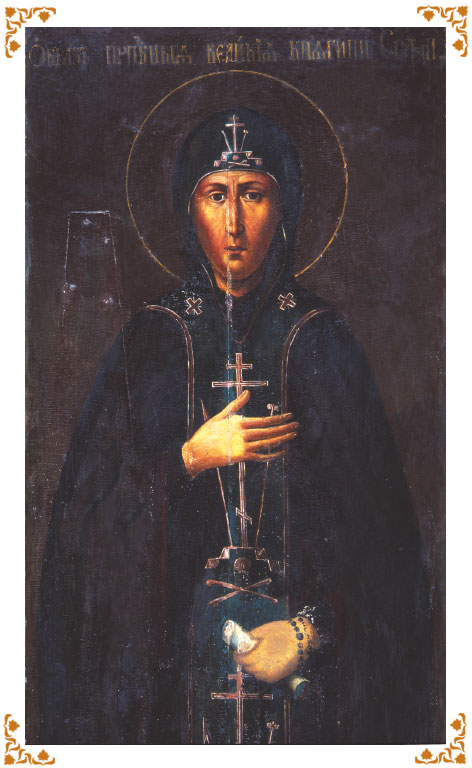
St. Sophia of Suzdal.

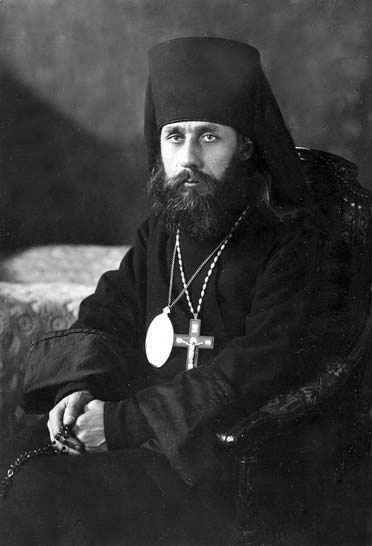
New Hieromartyr Arcadius (Ostalsky), Bishop of Bezhetsk.

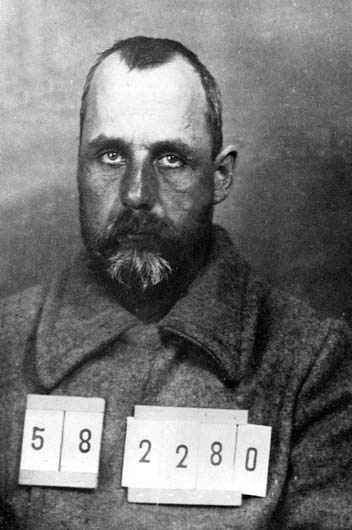
New Hieromartyr Arcadius (Ostalsky), Bishop of Bezhetsk - after NKVD tortures.

New Hieromartyr Peter Zinoviev, Priest of Tver.

== Sources ==
- December 16/29. Orthodox Calendar (PRAVOSLAVIE.RU).
- December 29 / December 16. HOLY TRINITY RUSSIAN ORTHODOX CHURCH (A parish of the Patriarchate of Moscow).
- December 16. OCA - The Lives of the Saints.
- The Autonomous Orthodox Metropolia of Western Europe and the Americas (ROCOR). St. Hilarion Calendar of Saints for the year of our Lord 2004. St. Hilarion Press (Austin, TX). p. 94.
- December 16. Latin Saints of the Orthodox Patriarchate of Rome.
- The Roman Martyrology. Transl. by the Archbishop of Baltimore. Last Edition, According to the Copy Printed at Rome in 1914. Revised Edition, with the Imprimatur of His Eminence Cardinal Gibbons. Baltimore: John Murphy Company, 1916.

Greek Sources

- Great Synaxaristes: (in Greek) 16 ΔΕΚΕΜΒΡΙΟΥ. ΜΕΓΑΣ ΣΥΝΑΞΑΡΙΣΤΗΣ.
- (in Greek) Συναξαριστής. 16 Δεκεμβρίου. ECCLESIA.GR. (H ΕΚΚΛΗΣΙΑ ΤΗΣ ΕΛΛΑΔΟΣ).

Russian Sources

- (in Russian) 29 декабря (16 декабря). Православная Энциклопедия под редакцией Патриарха Московского и всея Руси Кирилла (электронная версия). (Orthodox Encyclopedia - Pravenc.ru).
- (in Russian) 16 декабря (ст.ст.) 29 декабря 2013 (нов. ст.). Русская Православная Церковь Отдел внешних церковных связей. (DECR).
