= December 19 (Eastern Orthodox liturgics) =

Day in the Eastern Orthodox liturgical calendar

Eastern Orthodox liturgical calendar
December 18	December 19	December 20
December 19 O.S. ≍ January 1 N.S. December 19 N.S ≍ December 6 O.S.

An Eastern Orthodox cross

December 19 in Eastern Orthodox liturgical calendars is a feast day and a day of commemoration of saints and martyrs. Although some Orthodox churches use the Revised Julian Calendar and others use the traditional Julian calendar, the fixed commemorations for their respective December 19 are broadly the same, no matter which calendar is used. (Note: Despite the dates being the same, the days to which they refer typically differ by 13 days. The notation Old Style or O.S. is sometimes used to indicate a date in the traditional Julian Calendar (the "Old Calendar"). The notation New Style or N.S. indicates a date in the Revised Julian calendar (the "New Calendar").)

== Saints ==
- Martyr Boniface at Tarsus in Cilicia (290), and Righteous Aglae (Aglais, Aglaida) of Rome (c. 303)
- Martyrs Meuris and Thea in Palestine (307)
- Martyrs Elias, Probus, and Ares the Egyptians, in Cilicia (308) (Note: The Martyrs Elias, Probus and Ares, natives of Egypt, and heedless of their own safety, cared for Christians locked up in prison during the persecution of Maximian (305–313). For this they were arrested, subjected to torture and given over to death (+ 308).) (Note: There's probably a corruption of Elias and Ares into Hilary. This would make them be the same saints commemorated in December 16.)
- Martyrs Polyeuctus at Caesarea in Cappadocia, and Timothy the Deacon at Mauretania, by fire (309) (Note: It is also probable that this Caesarea is Caesarea in Mauretania. This would explain why both saints are commemorated together.)
- Saints Darius, Zosimus, Paul, and Secundus, martyrs of Nicaea by Diocletian (4th century)
- Martyrs Eutychios and Thessaloniki, and with them 200 men and 70 women, by the sword
- Martyr Tryphon, by hanging
- Hieromartyr Capito (Capiton), Bishop of Kherson (Cherson) (4th century)
- Saint Gregory (Gregentios) of Himyaritia (Gregentius of Himyar, Gregentios of Taphar, Gregory of Omirits), Missionary Archbishop of Zafar (capital of the Himyarite tribal confederacy) (552) (Note: "At first, Gregory was a deacon in a church in Mediolanum [Milan] and had many visions. By God's providence he was taken to Alexandria. There Patriarch Proterius, according to a heavenly revelation, consecrated him Bishop of the land of Omir (Himyaritia) in southern Arabia, which St. Elesbaan the King (October 24) had just freed from the tyranny of Dunaan the Jew. He was a good shepherd and great miracle-worker. He organized the Church in Omir with the help of the Christ-loving King Abramius, built many churches, and baptized many Jews. By his prayers he performed great and awesome miracles, even bringing about a revelation of Christ the Lord before the unbelieving Jews, which led to their baptism. He governed the Church for thirty years and entered peacefully into life eternal in the year 552.") (Note: (in Greek): "Ὅταν χήρεψε ἡ ἐπισκοπὴ Αἰθιοπίας, ὁ βασιλιὰς Ἐλεσβαᾶν ζήτησε ἀπὸ τὸν Πατριάρχη Ἀλεξανδρείας νὰ τοῦ στείλει ἐπίσκοπο μορφωμένο καὶ ἐνάρετο. Τότε ὁ Πατριάρχης ἐξέλεξε τὸν Γρηγέντιο, ὁ ὁποῖος ἐπετέλεσε τὴν ἀποστολή του μὲ πολὺ ζῆλο καὶ μεγάλη καρποφορία. Στὸν τόπο αὐτὸ ἦταν πολλοὶ Ἑβραῖοι καὶ ἦταν φανατικὰ προσκολλημένοι στὴ θεωρία τους. Ἕνας μάλιστα δεινὸς συζητητὴς ἀπ’ αὐτούς, ἦταν καὶ ὁ Ραβῖνος Ἐρβᾶς. Ἀλλὰ ὁ Γρηγέντιος, μὲ τὰ σοφὰ ἐπιχειρήματά του, τὴν ἀγαθότητά του καὶ μὲ τὴ θεία χάρη, κατόρθωσε νὰ φέρει στοὺς κόλπους τῆς Ἐκκλησίας τοὺς περισσότερους Ἑβραίους τοῦ τόπου καὶ τὸν ἴδιο τὸν Ἐρβᾶ, ποὺ βαπτίστηκε παρουσία τοῦ βασιλιὰ καὶ μετονομάστηκε Λέων καὶ τιμήθηκε μὲ τὸ ἀξίωμα τοῦ Πατρικίου. Ὁ διάδοχος τοῦ Ἐλεσβαᾶν, γιὸς τοῦ Ἔρδιδος, συνέχισε τὴν ἴδια πολιτικὴ εὐλάβειας πρὸς τὸν Γρηγέντιο. Ὁ Γρηγέντιος πέθανε εἰρηνικὰ στὶς 19 Δεκεμβρίου 552 καὶ τὴν στέρησή του, θρήνησε πολὺς κόσμος.")
- Saint Boniface the Merciful, Bishop of Ferentino (6th century)
- Venerable George the Scribe, and Venerable Sabbas (Sava, Savva), Monks of Khakhuli Monastery (11th century)

== Pre-Schism Western saints ==
- Saint Fausta of Sirmium, the mother of Saint Anastasia of Sirmium (3rd century)
- Saint Anastasius I, Pope of Rome (401) (Note: Pope of Rome and a man of poverty and the apostolic mind, he stopped the spread of Origenism at a Council held in 400.)
- Saint Avitus (Adjutus), Abbot of Micy near Orleans in France, an abbot renowned for the spirit of prophecy (c. 527)
- Saint Gregory of Auxerre, the twelfth bishop of Auxerre in France and Confessor (c. 540)
- Saint Ribert (Ribarius), seventeenth Abbot of Saint-Oyend in France, he is venerated in Franche-Comté (c. 790)
- Saint Manirus of Scotland, one of the Apostles of the north of Scotland (824)

== Post-Schism Orthodox saints ==
- Venerable Elias of Murom, Wonderworker of the Kiev Caves (1188) (Note: "The Monk Ilya Muromets of Pechersk, nicknamed "Chobotok" ("Shoemaker" or "Cobbler"), was from the city of Murom, and popular legend identifies him with the famous bogatyr-warrior hero Ilya Muromets, about whom were sung Russian byliny‑ballads. About the Monk Ilya is known, that he died with the fingers of his right hand formed for prayer in the position accepted even today in the Orthodox Church – the first three fingers together, and the two outermost last fingers contracted into the palm [in contrast to the hand formation in making the sign of the Cross used by the "Old Ritualist" "Staroverie" "Old Believers"]. In the period of the struggle with the Old Ritualist ("Staroobryadnyi") Schism (end of the 17th – 19th century), this fact from the life of the saint served as a powerful proof in the usage of the present hand formation.")
- Nun-Martyr Evloghia Țârlea, of Samurcășești Monastery (1949) (Note: See: (in Romanian) Evloghia Țârlea. Wikipedia. (Romanian Wikipedia).)
- Saint Seraphim Romantsov, Schema-Archimandrite of Sukhumi, Abkhazia, Elder of Glinsk Monastery (1976)

== Other commemorations ==
- Repose of Blessed Hieromonk Hermogenes, founder of Kirensk and Albazin Monasteries in Siberia (1690)
- Repose of Saint Amphilochius the Wonderworker of Pochaev (1971) (see also: April 29 - feast day)

== Icon gallery ==
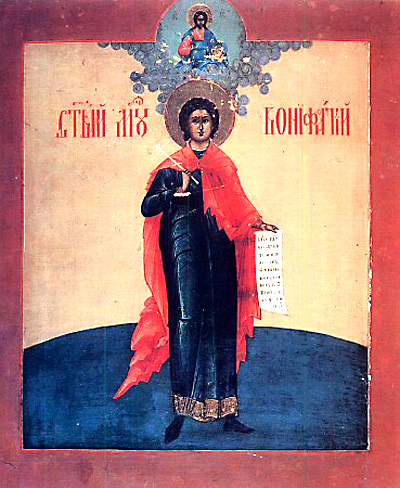
St. Bonifatius from Tarsus.

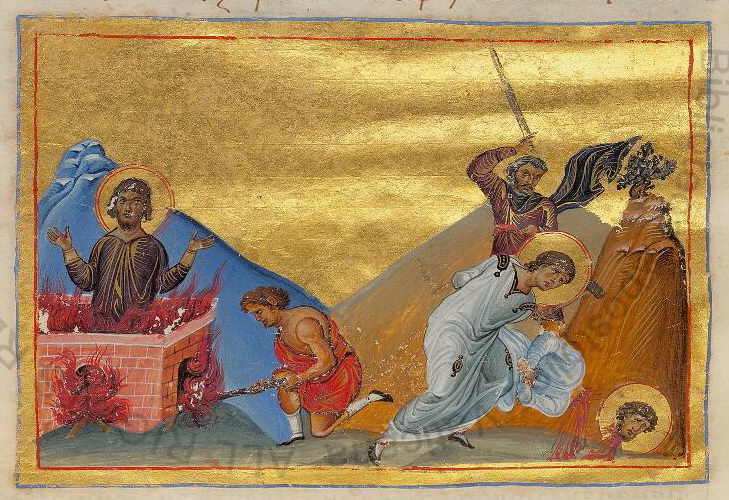
Martyrs Elias, Probus, and Ares the Egyptians, in Cilicia.
(Menologion of Basil II, 10th century).

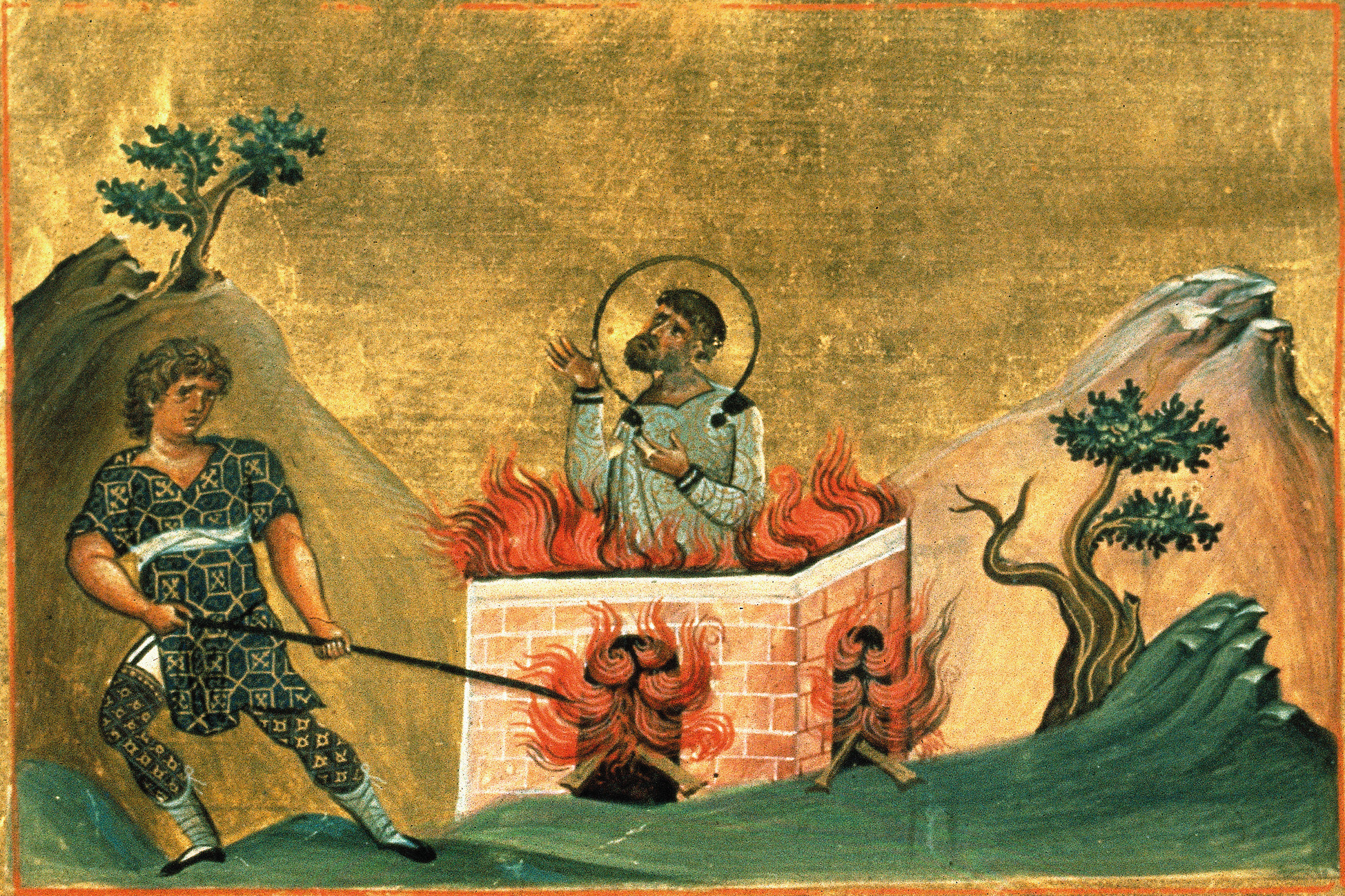
Martyr Polyeuctus, at Caesarea in Cappadocia (Menologion of Basil II, 10th century).

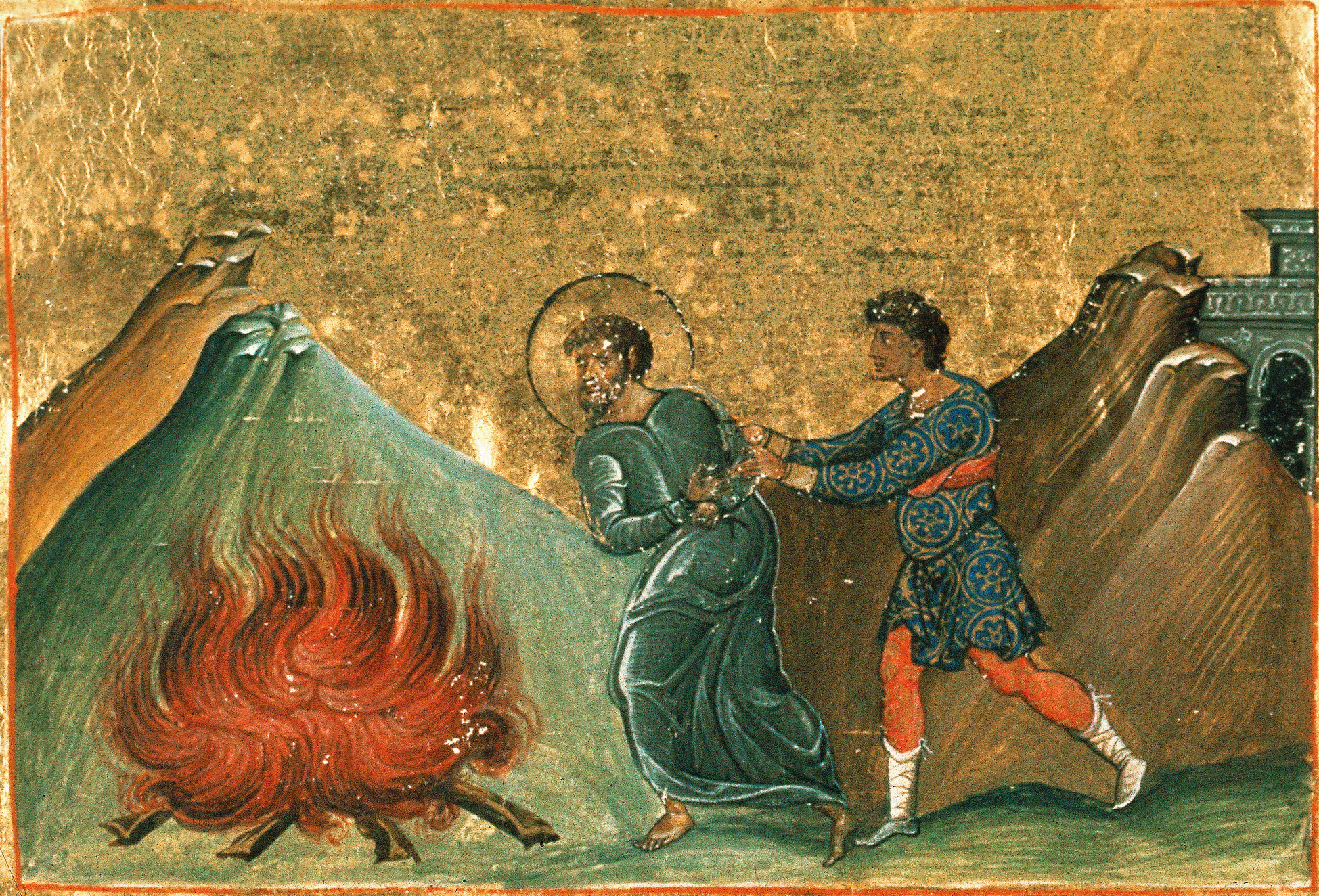
Martyr Timothy the Deacon, in Mauretania.
(Menologion of Basil II, 10th century).

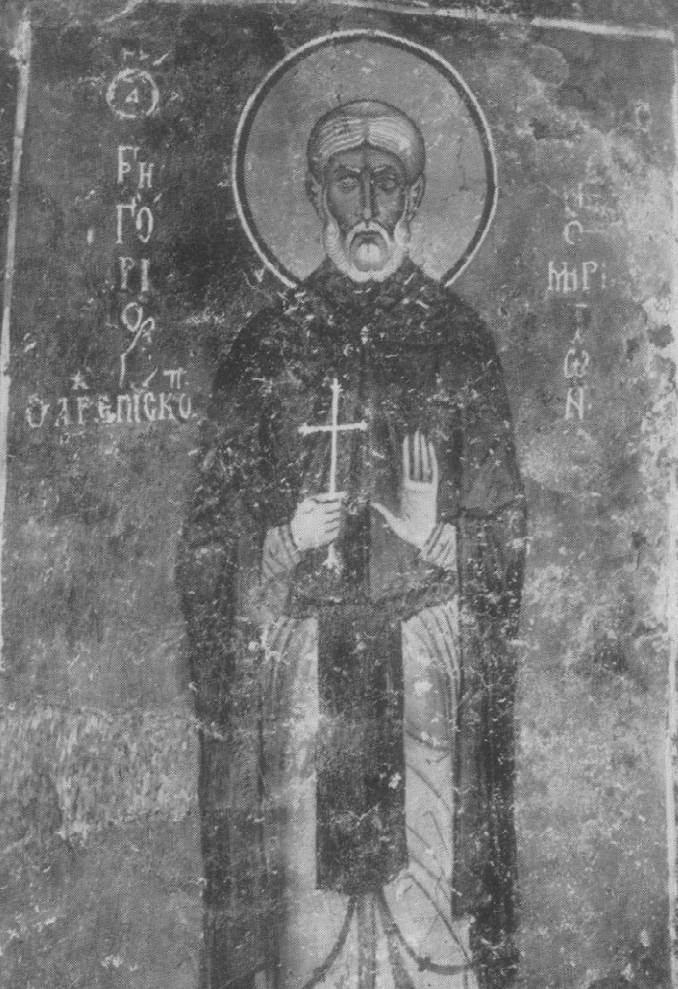
Saint Gregory (Gregentios) of Himyaritia, Missionary Archbishop of Zafar.
(12th-century fresco in a Cypriot church).

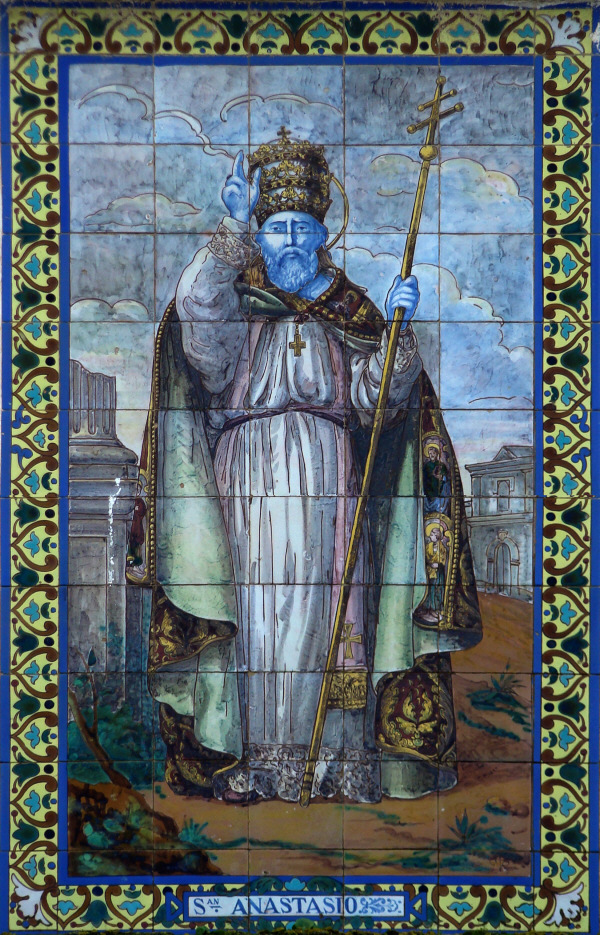
Ceramic altarpiece with St. Anastasius I, Pope of Rome (1923).

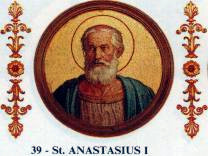
St. Anastasius I, Pope of Rome

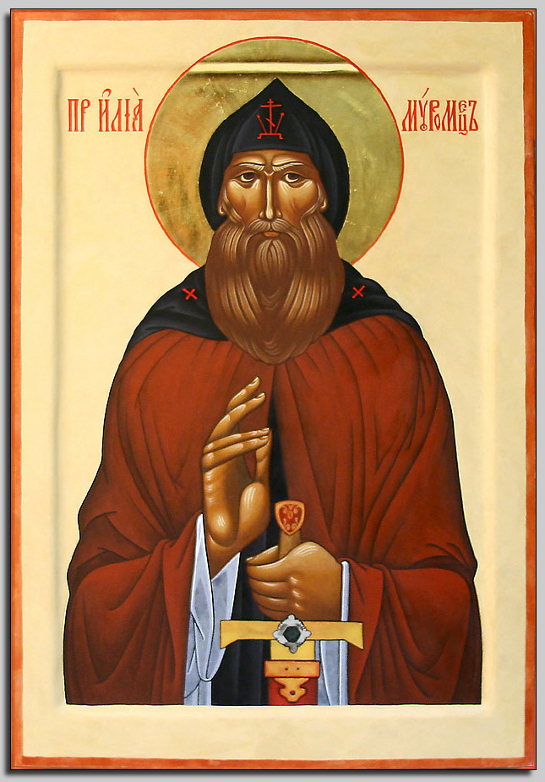
St. Elias of Murom (Ilya Muromets).

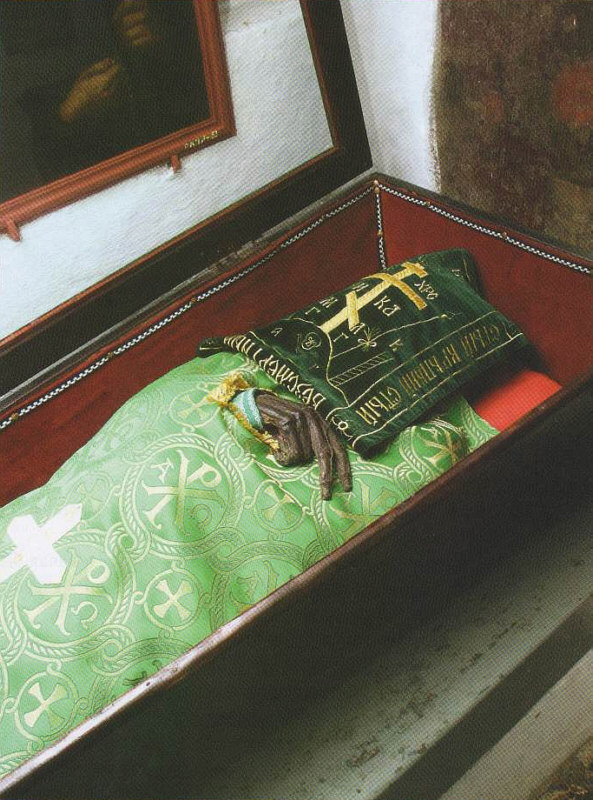
The relics of St. Elias of Murom (Ilya Muromets).

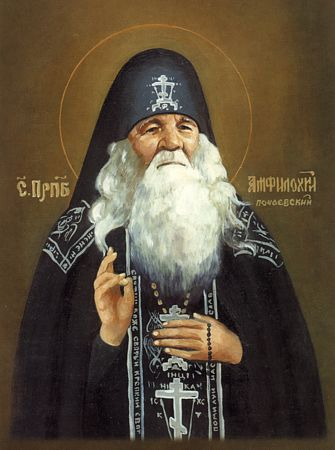
St. Amphilochius the Wonderworker of Pochaev.

== Sources ==
- December 19/January 1. Orthodox Calendar (PRAVOSLAVIE.RU).
- January 1 / December 19. HOLY TRINITY RUSSIAN ORTHODOX CHURCH (A parish of the Patriarchate of Moscow).
- December 19. OCA - The Lives of the Saints.
- The Autonomous Orthodox Metropolia of Western Europe and the Americas (ROCOR). St. Hilarion Calendar of Saints for the year of our Lord 2004. St. Hilarion Press (Austin, TX). p. 1.
- December 19. Latin Saints of the Orthodox Patriarchate of Rome.
- The Roman Martyrology. Transl. by the Archbishop of Baltimore. Last Edition, According to the Copy Printed at Rome in 1914. Revised Edition, with the Imprimatur of His Eminence Cardinal Gibbons. Baltimore: John Murphy Company, 1916.

Greek Sources

- Great Synaxaristes: (in Greek) 19 ΔΕΚΕΜΒΡΙΟΥ. ΜΕΓΑΣ ΣΥΝΑΞΑΡΙΣΤΗΣ.
- (in Greek) Συναξαριστής. 19 Δεκεμβρίου. ECCLESIA.GR. (H ΕΚΚΛΗΣΙΑ ΤΗΣ ΕΛΛΑΔΟΣ).

Russian Sources

- (in Russian) 1 января (19 декабря). Православная Энциклопедия под редакцией Патриарха Московского и всея Руси Кирилла (электронная версия). (Orthodox Encyclopedia - Pravenc.ru).
- (in Russian) 19 декабря (ст.ст.) 1 января 2015 (нов. ст.). Русская Православная Церковь Отдел внешних церковных связей. (DECR).
