= Rufus and Zosimus =

2nd century Christian martyrs

Saints Rufus and Zosimus
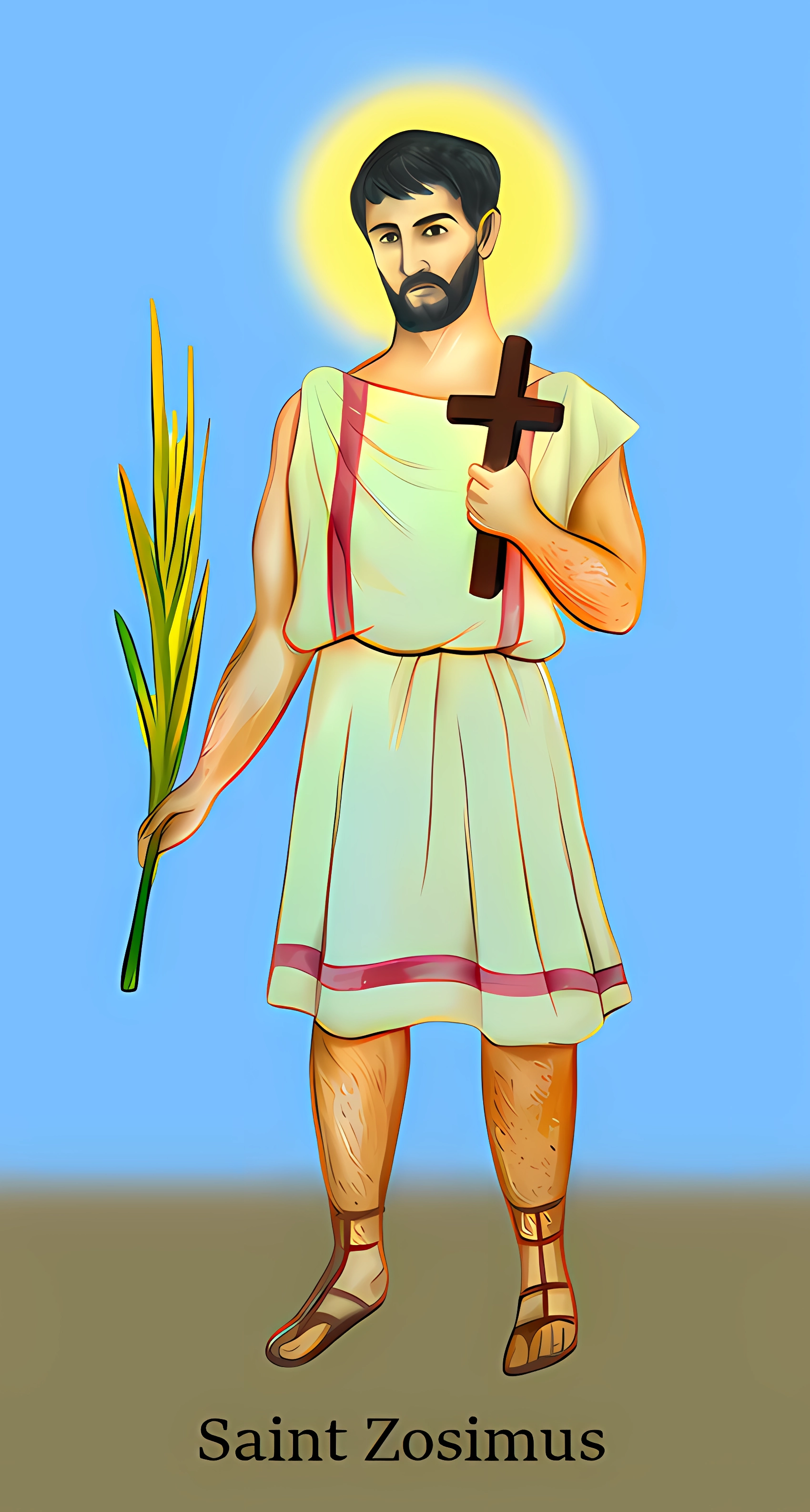

Martyrs
- Died: 107; Rome, Roman Empire
- Venerated in: Roman Catholic Church, Eastern Orthodox Churches
- Feast: 18 December

Rufus and Zosimus (died 107 AD) are 2nd century Christian martyrs venerated by the Roman Catholic and the Eastern Orthodox churches. They lived in Antioch and were martyred with Ignatius of Antioch during the persecution of Christians under the Roman emperor Trajan. They were killed by beasts in the Roman arena two days before Ignatius suffered the same fate. Their feast day is December 18.
