= Dabheog =

Irish saint

Saint Dabheog
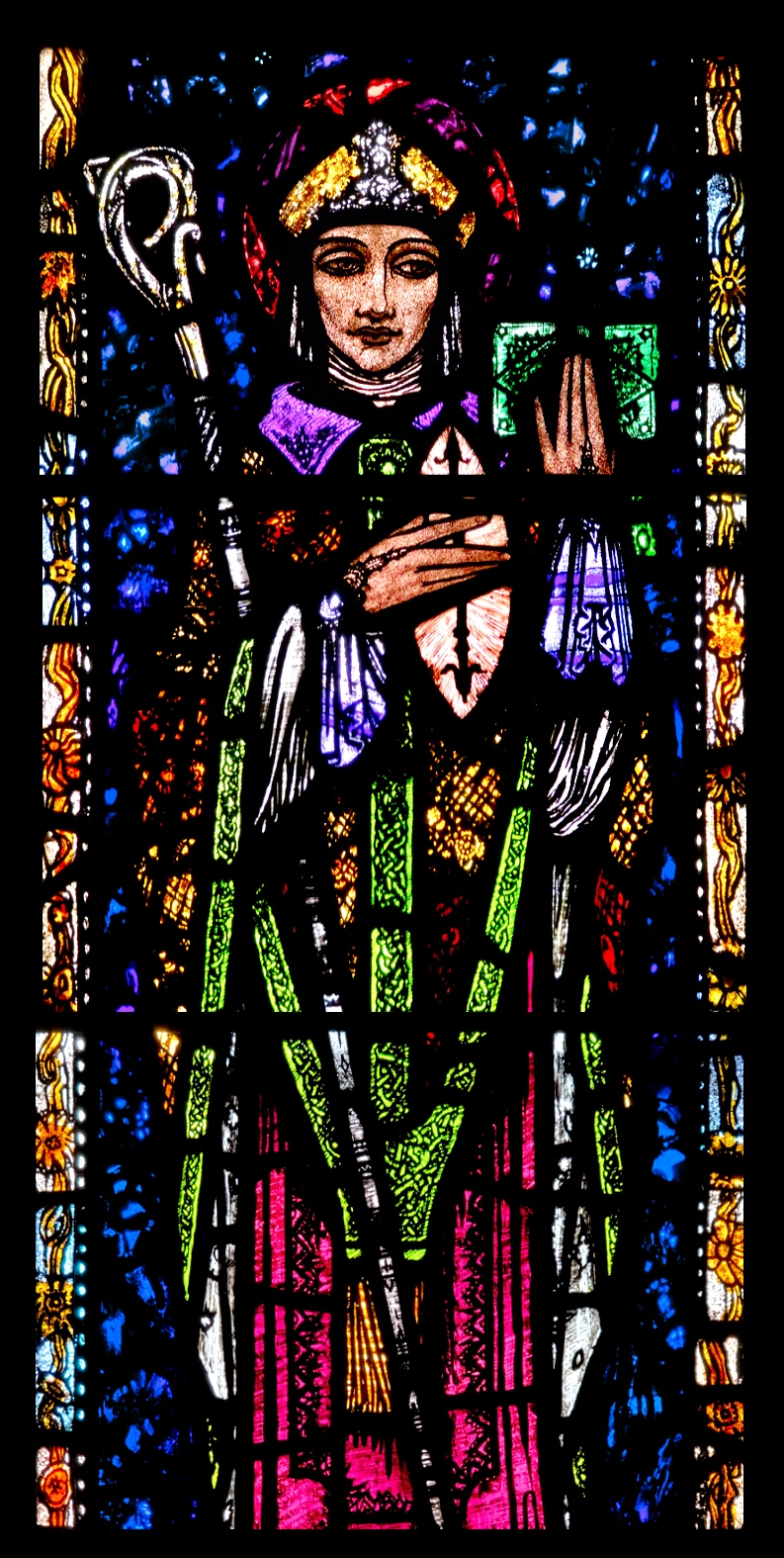
- St Dabheog by Harry Clarke Studios at St. Joseph's Carrickmacross

Abbot of Lough Derg
- Born: 5th century? Wales
- Patronage: Patron saint of Lough Derg

Saint Dabheog is the patron saint and a founder of a monastery on an island in Lough Derg, a lake in County Donegal, Ireland, near the town of Pettigo and shouldering the border of counties Donegal and Fermanagh. His feast day is 16 December.

== Biography ==
Little is known about his biography but local records mention his existence as an abbot of Lough Derg in the 5th century. Healy states that Dabheog was born in Wales. He was the son of King Breca (or Brychan), the great father of a host of Welsh saints.

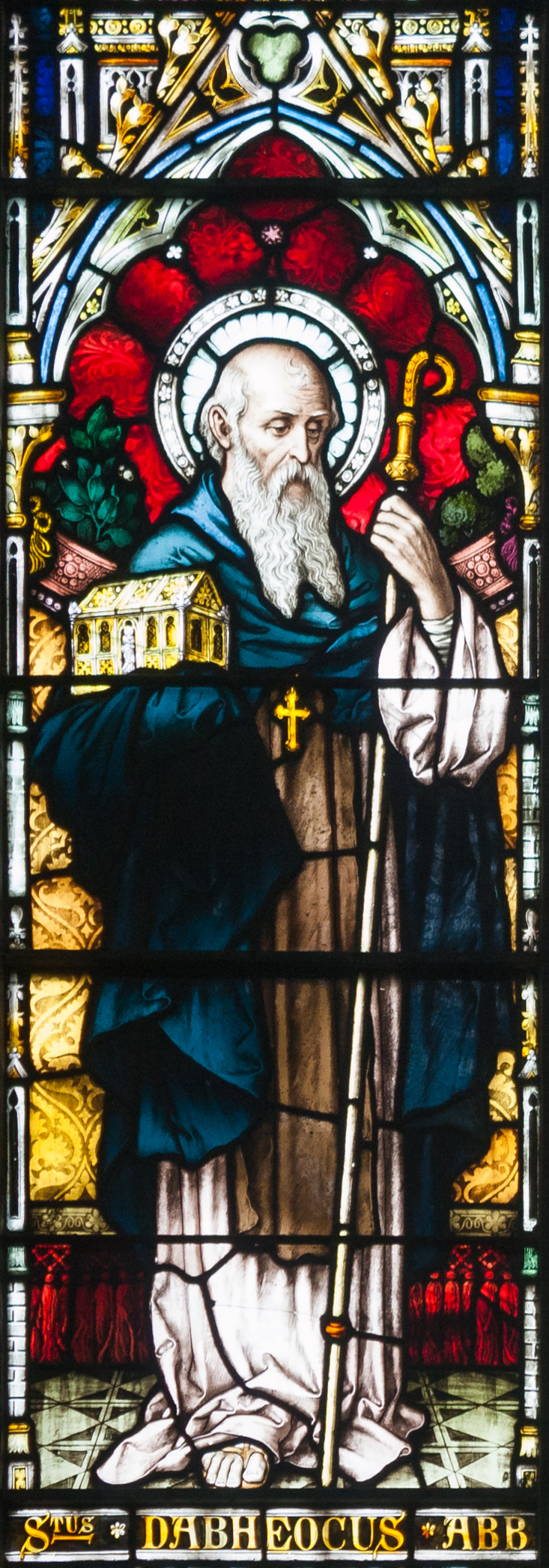
St. Dabheog at St. Macartan's Cathedral

Dabheog is considered to be a disciple of Saint Patrick who became responsible for caring for the site known as St. Patrick's Purgatory, which was on one of the islands in the lake known as Lough Derg. He took charge of the church and hermitage in Tirhugh.

There is a firmly established tradition regarding St. Dabheog, who presided over, and possibly established, the monastery on the site during the lifetime of Patrick. His name has been associated from early centuries with several places in the area: St. Dabheoc's Chair on the south bank of Lough Derg, the townland of Seedavoc (St. Dabheoc's Seat), and a mountain in that townland, Seavadog Mountain. One of the islands in Lough Derg was also named after him: St. Dabheoc's Island, which may have been Saints Island.

Many of the modern Catholic pilgrimage rituals at Lough Derg are focused on devotion to St. Dabheog: including the short hike to a pre-Christian Bronze Age burial site (known as Dabheog's Chair or Seat) on a hill overlooking Lough Derg, and the meditation upon one of the beehive cells on Station Island which is dedicated to the saint.

One of the boats which transports pilgrims to Station Island is named after Dabheog, as well as the valley overlooking Lough Erne. The Clan McGrath, who were the Coarbs (hereditary overseers) of Lough Derg from the 13th-17th century, consider Dabheog as their patron saint. Dabheog is also known by the following aliases: Dabeoc, Davog, Davoc, Daboc, Beoc, Mobeoc, Mobheog, Daveoc, Daveog. This variation is due to the lack of standardization in the Irish language and the ambiguity of the saint's historical origins.

The plant name Daboecia has been given to St. Dabheog's heath.
