= Zharki, Vologda Oblast =

Zharki Жарки
- Village
- Location within Vologda Oblast Location within Russia
- Coordinates: 58°57′N 38°32′E
- Country: Russia
- Region: Vologda Oblast
- District: Cherepovetsky District
- Time zone: UTC+3:00

Zharki (Russian: Жарки) is a rural locality (a village) in Yugskoye Rural Settlement, Cherepovetsky District, Vologda Oblast, Russia. The population was 3 as of 2002. There are 4 streets.

== Geography ==
Zharki is located 55 km southeast of Cherepovets (the district's administrative centre) by road. Velyamikovo is the nearest rural locality.
