= Zharki, Vladimir Oblast =

Zharki Жарки
- Village
- Location within Vladimir Oblast Location within Russia
- Coordinates: 55°53′N 40°38′E
- Country: Russia
- Region: Vladimir Oblast
- District: Sudogodsky District
- Time zone: UTC+3:00

Zharki (Russian: Жарки) is a rural locality (a village) in Golovinskoye Rural Settlement, Sudogodsky District, Vladimir Oblast, Russia. Its population was 11 as of 2010.

== Geography ==
Zharki is located on the Vanchuga River, 27 km southwest of Sudogda (the district's administrative centre) by road. Buchkovo is the nearest rural locality.
