= January 14 (Eastern Orthodox liturgics) =

Day in the Eastern Orthodox liturgical calendar

Eastern Orthodox liturgical calendar
January 13	January 14	January 15
January 14 O.S. ≍ January 27 N.S. January 14 N.S ≍ January 1 O.S.

An Eastern Orthodox cross

January 14 in Eastern Orthodox liturgical calendars is a feast day and a day of commemoration of saints and martyrs. Although some Orthodox churches use the Revised Julian Calendar and others use the traditional Julian calendar, the fixed commemorations for their respective January 14 are broadly the same, no matter which calendar is used. (Note: Despite the dates being the same, the days to which they refer typically differ by 13 days. The notation Old Style or O.S. is sometimes used to indicate a date in the traditional Julian Calendar (the "Old Calendar"). The notation New Style or N.S, indicates a date in the Revised Julian calendar (the "New Calendar").)

== Feasts ==
- Apodosis (Leavetaking) of the Theophany of Our Lord and Savior Jesus Christ.

== Saints ==
- Virgin Martyr Agnes, in dark solitary confinement.
- Saint Nina (Nino), Equal-to-the-Apostles, Enlightener of Georgia (335)
- Saint Joseph Analytinus of Raithu Monastery (4th century) (Note: Saint Joseph Analytinus of Raithu was a strict ascetic He attained such a high degree of perfection in the spiritual life that a light shone upon him while he prayed. He foretold the time of his death to his disciple Gelasius, and died in peace, before the slaughter of the Sinai Fathers.)
- The Holy Fathers slain at Mount Sinai and Raithu (4th-5th century), including:

- the Holy 38 Fathers slain at Mount Sinai (c. 300-311), (Note: "Some say that the massacre occurred in the reign of Diocletian and in the episcopate of St. Peter of Alexandria (d. 311, cf. 24 Nov.); according to others it happened in the reign of Theodosius the Great (d. 395). In any case, it is hard to know whether the three massacres commemorated today do in fact refer to three distinct events." "...The few survivors buried them with tears, and found two other monks still alive. One of them died that evening; and the other, Sabas by name, although not badly wounded, wept and exclaimed, 'Woe is me, wretched and unworthy sinner that I am, who am alone excluded from the everlasting blessedness which the holy Martyrs have acquired today!' The Lord at last heard his prayer, and he gave up his soul, thus completing the choir of forty (40) holy Martyrs." "On Mount Sinai, thirty-eight holy monks, killed by the Saracens for the faith of Christ.") and:
- the Holy 43 Fathers slain at Raithu (c. mid-5th century), (Note: "In Egypt, in the district of Raithy, forty-three holy monks, who were put to death by the Blemmians, for the Christian religion.") including Hieromartyrs:

- Isaiah, Sabbas, Moses and his disciple Moses, Jeremiah, Paul, Adam, Sergius, Domnus, Proclus, Hypatius, Isaac, Macarius, Mark, Benjamin, Eusebius, Elias, and others.

- Venerable Theodulus (Theodoulos), son of Venerable Nilus of Sinai (5th century)
- Venerable Stephen, Abbot of Chenolakkos Monastery in Triglia, near Chalcedon (716)

== Pre-Schism Western saints ==
- Saint Felix, a presbyter at Nola near Naples, Italy, sometimes referred to as a martyr (c. 250) (Note: The son of a Romano-Syrian soldier who had settled in Nola near Naples in Italy. Felix was ordained a priest and devoted himself to his bishop, St. Maximus, especially during the persecution which broke out under Decius. On account of his sufferings during the persecution, he was sometimes referred to as a martyr.) (Note: "At Nola, in Campania, the birthday of St. Felix, priest, who (as is related by bishop St. Paulinus), after being subjected to torments by the persecutors, was cast into prison and extended, bound hand and foot, on (snail) shells and broken earthenware. In the night, however, his bonds were loosened and he was delivered by an angel. The persecution over, he brought many to the faith of Christ by his exemplary life and teaching, and, renowned for miracles, rested in peace.") (see also: November 15)
- Saint Euphrasius, a bishop martyred in North Africa by the Arian Vandals.
- Saint Dacius (Datius), Bishop of Milan (552) (Note: His diocese was overrun by Arian Ostrogoths and he had to flee to Constantinople where he spent the rest of his life.)
- Saint Kentigern (Mungo), first Bishop of Strathclyde (Glasgow), Scotland (614) (see also January 13 - Greek and West)
- Saint Fulgentius of Cartagena, Bishop of Ecija, Spain (630 or 632)

== Post-Schism Orthodox saints ==
- Saint Sava I (Savva I), Enlightener and first Archbishop of Serbia (1235) (see also January 12)
- Saint Joannicius of Tarnovo, Metropolitan of Tarnovo in Bulgaria (13th century)
- Saint Acacius, Bishop of Tver (1567) (Note: "Acacius, Bishop of Tver, died Moscow, 14 January 1567. Russian Church. Known as Alexander in his monastery, he was bishop from 1522. Feast 29 June." See also: (in Russian): Акакий (епископ Тверской). Russian Wikipedia.) (see also June 29)
- Saint Meletius (Meletios) Yakimov, Bishop of Ryazan, Missionary to Yakutia (1900) (Note: See also: (in Russian): Мелетий (Якимов). Russian Wikipedia.)

=== New martyrs and confessors ===
- New Hieromartyr Ambrose (Ambrosius) Gudko, Bishop of Sarapul and Yelabug (1918) (see also: July 27)
- New Hieromartyrs Platon Kulbusch, Bishop of Revel (Tallinn), Estonia, Nicholas Bezhanitsky and Michael Bleive, Archpriests (1919), and all the New Martyrs of Estonia. (see also January 1)
- New Martyrs slain at Raithu Monastery near Kazan (1930):

- Joseph (Gavrilov), Anthony (Chirkov), Varlaam (Pohilyuk), Job (Protopopov), and Sergius (Guskov), Hieromonks, and Peter (Trupitsyn), Novice.

- New Hieroconfessor John Kevroletin, Hieroschemamonk of Verkhoturye (1961)

== Other commemorations ==
- Repose of Nicholas Motovilov (1879), disciple of Saint Seraphim of Sarov.
- Repose of Hieromonk Cosmas of Grigoriou, Missionary to Zaire (1989)

== Icon gallery ==
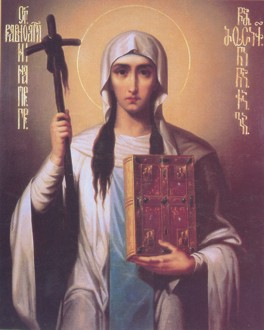
St. Nina (Nino), Equal-to-the-Apostles, Enlightener of Georgia.

The Holy Fathers slain at Mount Sinai
(In the reign of Diocletian (284-305), and in
the episcopate of St. Peter of Alexandria
(c. 300-311)).
(Menologion of Basil II, 10th century).

The Holy Fathers slain at Mount Sinai
(In the reign of Theodosius the Great
(c. 379-395)).
(Menologion of Basil II, 10th century).

The Holy 43 Fathers slain at Raithu
(c. mid-5th century).
(Menologion of Basil II, 10th century).

Venerable Theodulus (Theodoulos), son of Venerable Nilus of Sinai.
(Menologion of Basil II, 10th century).

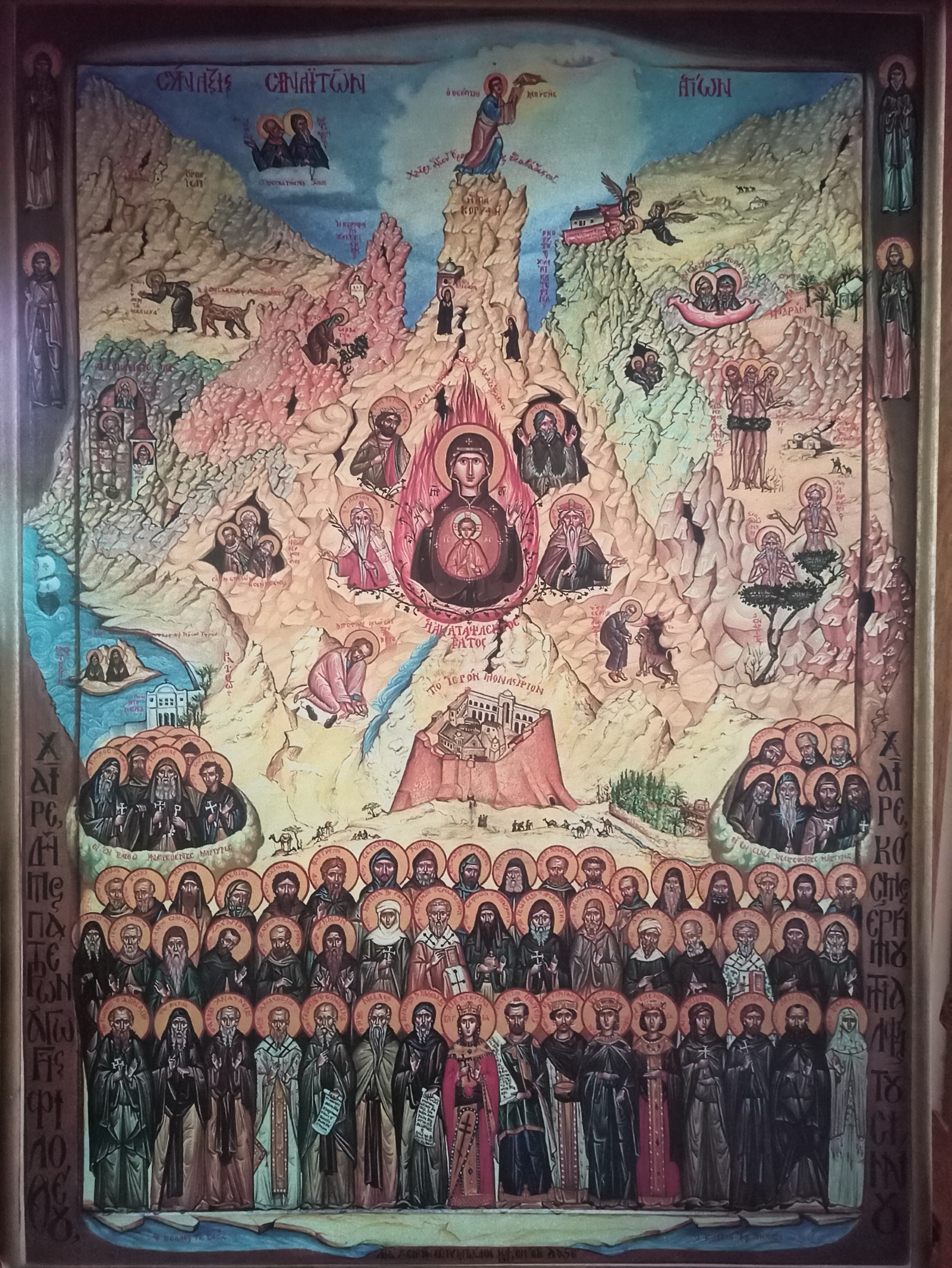
Icon of the Synaxis of All Saints of Mount Sinai. (Note: The Synaxis of the Saints of Sinai is commemorated on Bright Wednesday.)

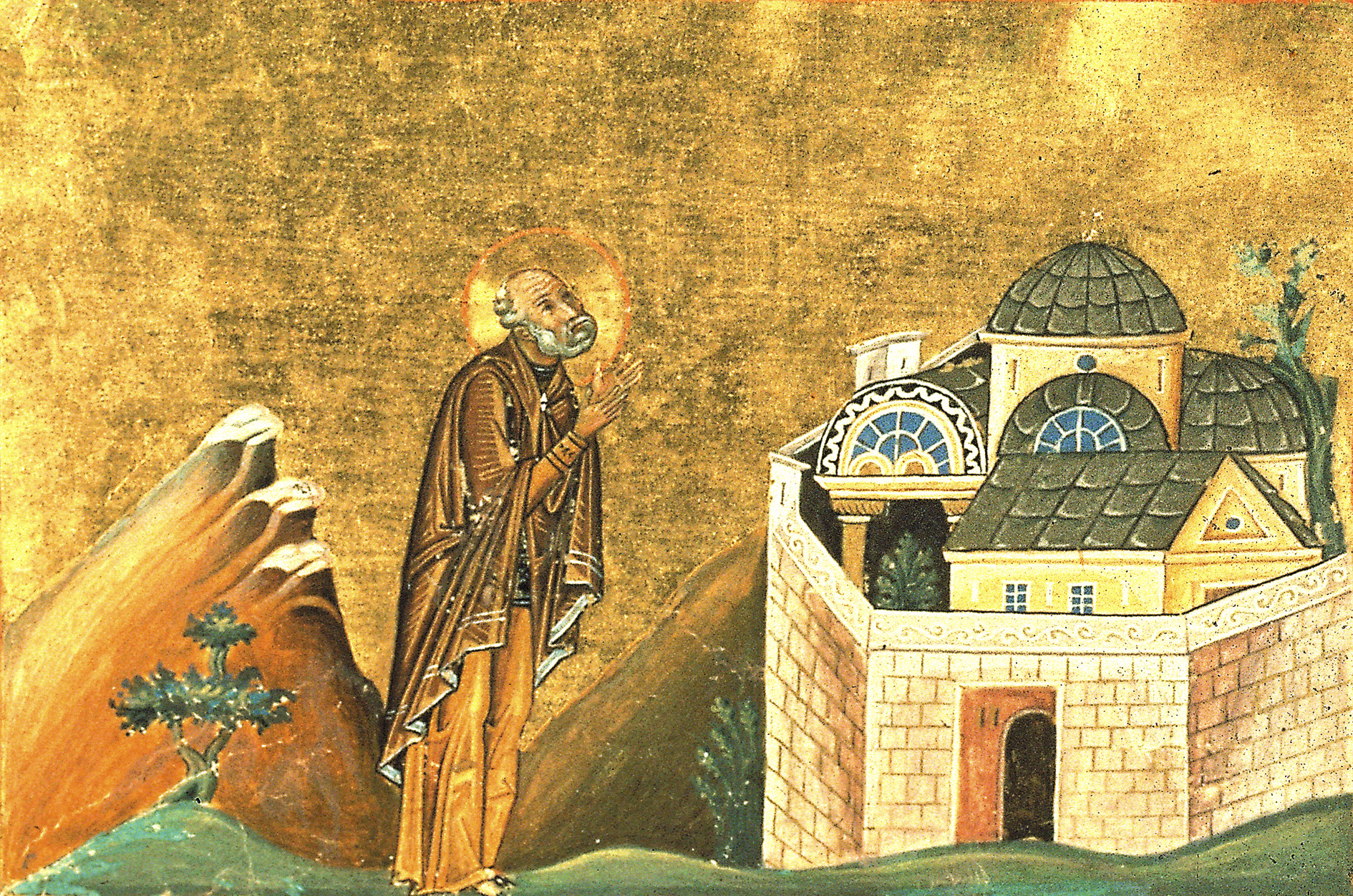
Venerable Stephen, Abbot of Chenolakkos Monastery in Triglia, near Chalcedon.
(Menologion of Basil II, 10th century).

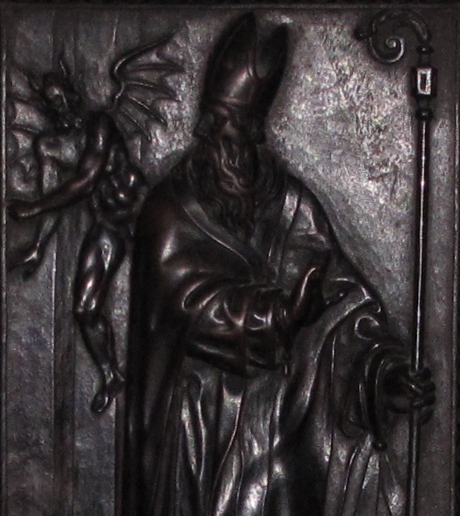
St. Dacius, Bishop of Milan, as an exorcist.

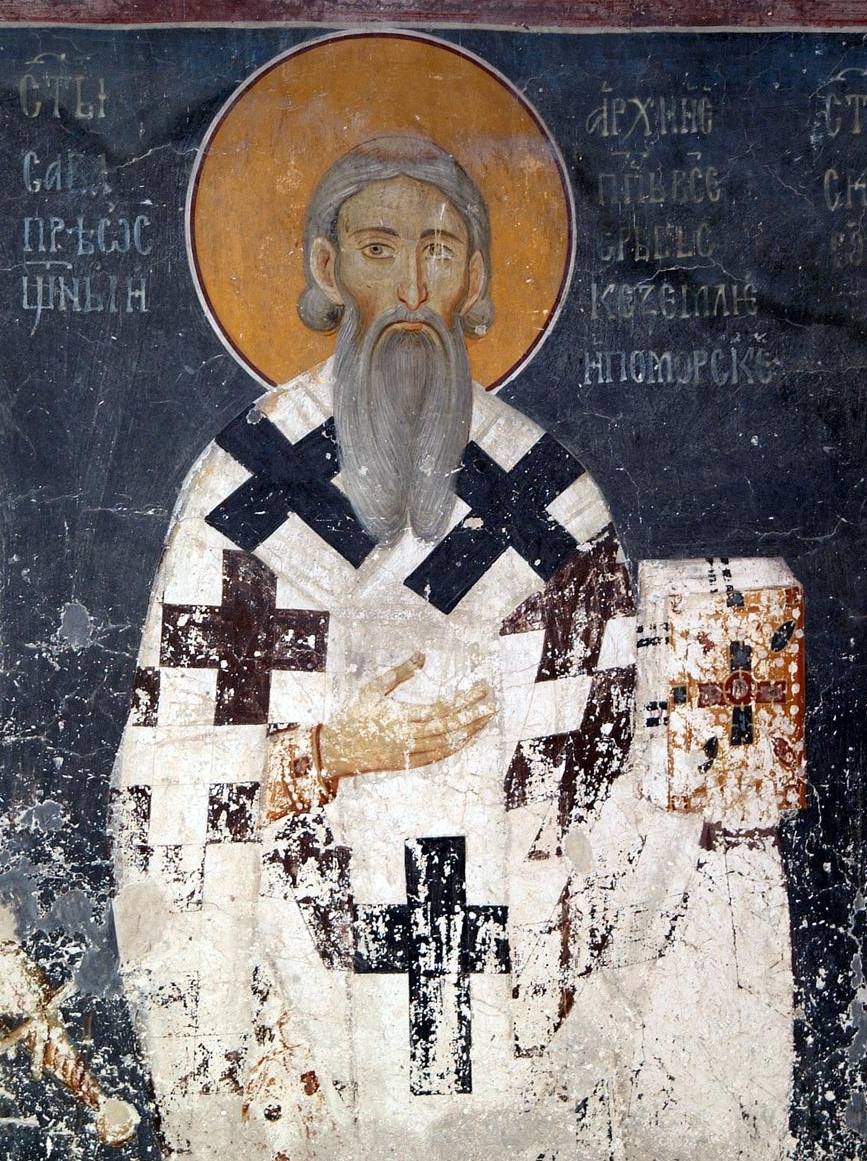
Saint Sava I, Equal-to-the-Apostles, Enlightener and first Archbishop of Serbia.

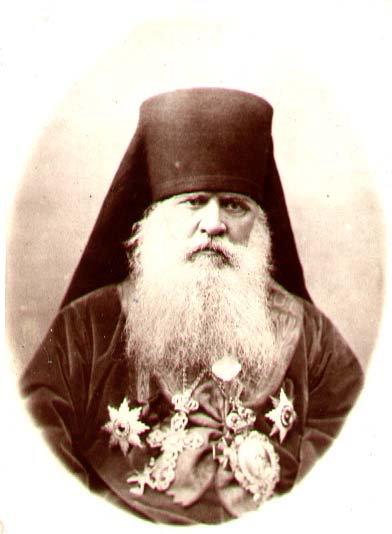
St. Meletius (Yakimov), Bishop of Ryazan, Missionary to Yakutia.

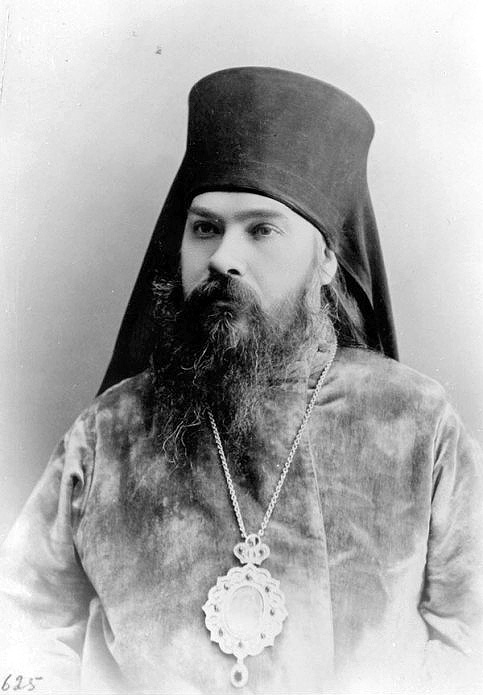
New Martyr Ambrosius (Gudko), Bishop of Sarapul and Yelabug.

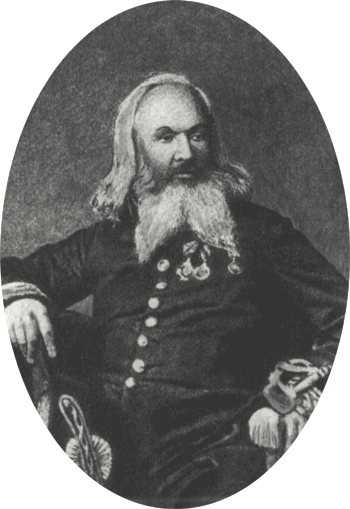
Nicholas Motovilov, disciple of St. Seraphim of Sarov, and Fool for Christ.

== Sources ==
- January 14/January 27. Orthodox Calendar (PRAVOSLAVIE.RU).
- January 27 / January 14. HOLY TRINITY RUSSIAN ORTHODOX CHURCH (A parish of the Patriarchate of Moscow).
- January 14. OCA - The Lives of the Saints.
- The Autonomous Orthodox Metropolia of Western Europe and the Americas (ROCOR). St. Hilarion Calendar of Saints for the year of our Lord 2004. St. Hilarion Press (Austin, TX). p. 7.
- January 14. Latin Saints of the Orthodox Patriarchate of Rome.
- The Roman Martyrology. Transl. by the Archbishop of Baltimore. Last Edition, According to the Copy Printed at Rome in 1914. Revised Edition, with the Imprimatur of His Eminence Cardinal Gibbons. Baltimore: John Murphy Company, 1916. pp. 14–15.

Greek Sources

- Great Synaxaristes: (in Greek) 14 ΙΑΝΟΥΑΡΙΟΥ. ΜΕΓΑΣ ΣΥΝΑΞΑΡΙΣΤΗΣ.
- (in Greek) Συναξαριστής. 14 Ιανουαρίου. ECCLESIA.GR. (H ΕΚΚΛΗΣΙΑ ΤΗΣ ΕΛΛΑΔΟΣ).

Russian Sources

- (in Russian) 27 января (14 января). Православная Энциклопедия под редакцией Патриарха Московского и всея Руси Кирилла (электронная версия). (Orthodox Encyclopedia - Pravenc.ru).
- (in Russian) 14 января (ст.ст.) 27 января 2014 (нов. ст.). Русская Православная Церковь Отдел внешних церковных связей. (DECR).
