= Kholm =

Kholm may refer to:

- Kholm, Afghanistan, a town in Afghanistan
- Kholm, Russia, name of several inhabited localities in Russia
- Kholm, Kholmsky District, Novgorod Oblast
- Kholm, transliteration of Ukrainian name for the town of Chełm (Eastern Poland)

== See also ==
- Kholmsky (disambiguation)
- Kholm Governorate (disambiguation)
