= July 27 (Eastern Orthodox liturgics) =

Day in the Eastern Orthodox liturgical calendar

Eastern Orthodox liturgical calendar
| July 26 | July 27 | July 28 |
July 27 O.S. ≍ August 9 N.S. July 27 N.S ≍ July 14 O.S.

An Eastern Orthodox cross

July 27 in Eastern Orthodox liturgical calendars is a feast day and a day of commemoration of saints and martyrs. Although some Orthodox churches use the Revised Julian Calendar and others use the traditional Julian calendar, the fixed commemorations for their respective July 27 are broadly the same, no matter which calendar is used. (Note: Despite the dates being the same, the days to which they refer typically differ by 13 days. The notation Old Style or O.S. is sometimes used to indicate a date in the traditional Julian Calendar (the "Old Calendar"). The notation New Style or N.S. indicates a date in the Revised Julian calendar (the "New Calendar").)

== Saints ==
- Holy Great-martyr and Healer Panteleimon (305) (Note: "AT Nicomedia, the martyrdom of St. Pantaleon, a physician. For the faith of Christ he was apprehended by the emperor Maximian, subjected to the torture and burned with torches, during which torments he was comforted by an apparition of our Lord. He ended his martyrdom by a stroke of the sword.") (Note: Name days celebrated today include: Pantelis, Bentley (Παντελής).) (Note: MAGNIFICATION: "We magnify you, Holy Passion-Bearer, Great-Martyr and Healer Panteleimon and we honour the worthy sufferings which you endured for Christ." KONDAK, TONE 5: "As an imitator of the Merciful One, you received the grace of healing from Him, O Passion-Bearer and martyr of Christ. Heal our spiritual diseases by your intercessions and always dispel the snares of the enemy, from them who with faith cry out: save us, O Lord!")
- The blind man healed by St. Panteleimon and beheaded for Christ (4th century)
- The Holy 153 Martyrs of Thrace, by drowning.
- Saint Symeon Stylites (the Younger) of Sicily (6th century)
- Venerable Anthousa the Confessor, Abbess of Mantineus Convent, and her 90 monastic sisters (759) (Note: "At Constantinople, blessed Anthusa, a virgin. Under Constantine Copronymus, after being scourged and banished, she rested in the Lord.")
- Righteous Manuel, monk.
- Holy Equal-to-the-Apostles Clement of Ochrid, Archbishop of Ochrid (916), Angelarius, Gorazd (Horasdus), Nahum, and Sabbas (9th-10th centuries), of Ochrid, disciples of Saints Cyril and Methodius. (see also: May 11 and July 17)

== Pre-Schism Western saints ==
- Martyrs Maurus, Pantaleimon and Sergius, under Trajan (c. 117) (Note: Three martyrs venerated in Bisceglia on the Adriatic in Italy. Maurus is said to have been born in Bethlehem, sent by the Apostle Peter to be the first Bishop of Bisceglia. They were martyred under Trajan.) (Note: "At Biseglia, in Apulia, the holy martyrs Maurus, bishop, Pantaleemon, and Sergius, who suffered under Trajan.")
- Saint Ecclesius, Bishop of Ravenna in Italy from 521 till 532 (Note: He began building San Vitale, where there is still a mosaic of him.)
- Saint Etherius, Bishop of Auxerre in France (573) (Note: "At Auxerre, the demise of blessed Ætherius, bishop and confessor.")
- Martyrs Aurelius, his wife Sabigotha (Natalia), Felix and his wife Liliosa, and Hieromartyr George the Sabbaïte, Hierodeacon, at Córdoba (852) (Note: Martyrs in Cordoba in Spain under the Caliph Abderrahman II. Aurelius and Felix, with their wives, Natalia and Liliosa, were Spaniards; but the deacon George was a monk from Palestine, who, though offered pardon as a foreigner, chose martyrdom for Christ with the others.) (Note: "At Córdoba, in Spain, during the persecution of the Arabs, the holy martyrs George, deacon, Felix, Aurelius, Natalia, and Liliosa.")

== Post-Schism Orthodox saints ==
- Blessed Nicholas Kochanov, Fool-for-Christ of Novgorod (1392)
- Saint Ioasaph of Moscow, Metropolitan of Moscow (1555)
- New Martyr Christodoulos of Cassandra, at Thessaloniki (1777)

=== New martyrs and confessors ===
- New Hieromartyr Ambrose (Gudko), Bishop of Sarapul (1918)
- New Hieromartyrs Platon Gornykh (Note: See: (in Russian) Горных, Платон Горгониевич. Википедии. (Russian Wikipedia).) and Panteleimon Bogoyavlensky, Priests (1918)
- New Hieromartyr John Solovyev, Priest (1941) (Note: See: (in Russian) Соловьёв, Иван Михайлович (священномученик). Википедии. (Russian Wikipedia).)
- New Martyrs of Garavice and Bihac-Petrovac. (Note: The Martyrs of Garavice and Bihać-Petrovac were 12,000 Serbs who were brutally murdered by Ustaše forces in 1941 near Bihać at one of the largest execution sites of World War II in Bosnia and Herzegovina.)

== Other commemorations ==
- Glorification (1970) of St. Herman of Alaska (1836)
- Repose of Abbess Pulcheria of Viatka, Abbess of Nativity Convent (1890)
- Icon of the Most Holy Theotokos of Magadan (1989)

== Icon gallery ==
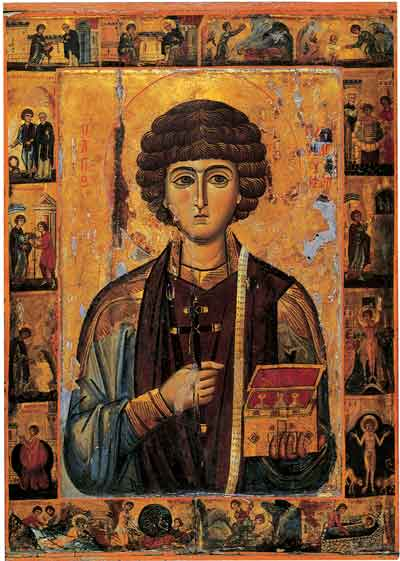
Great-martyr and Healer Panteleimon.

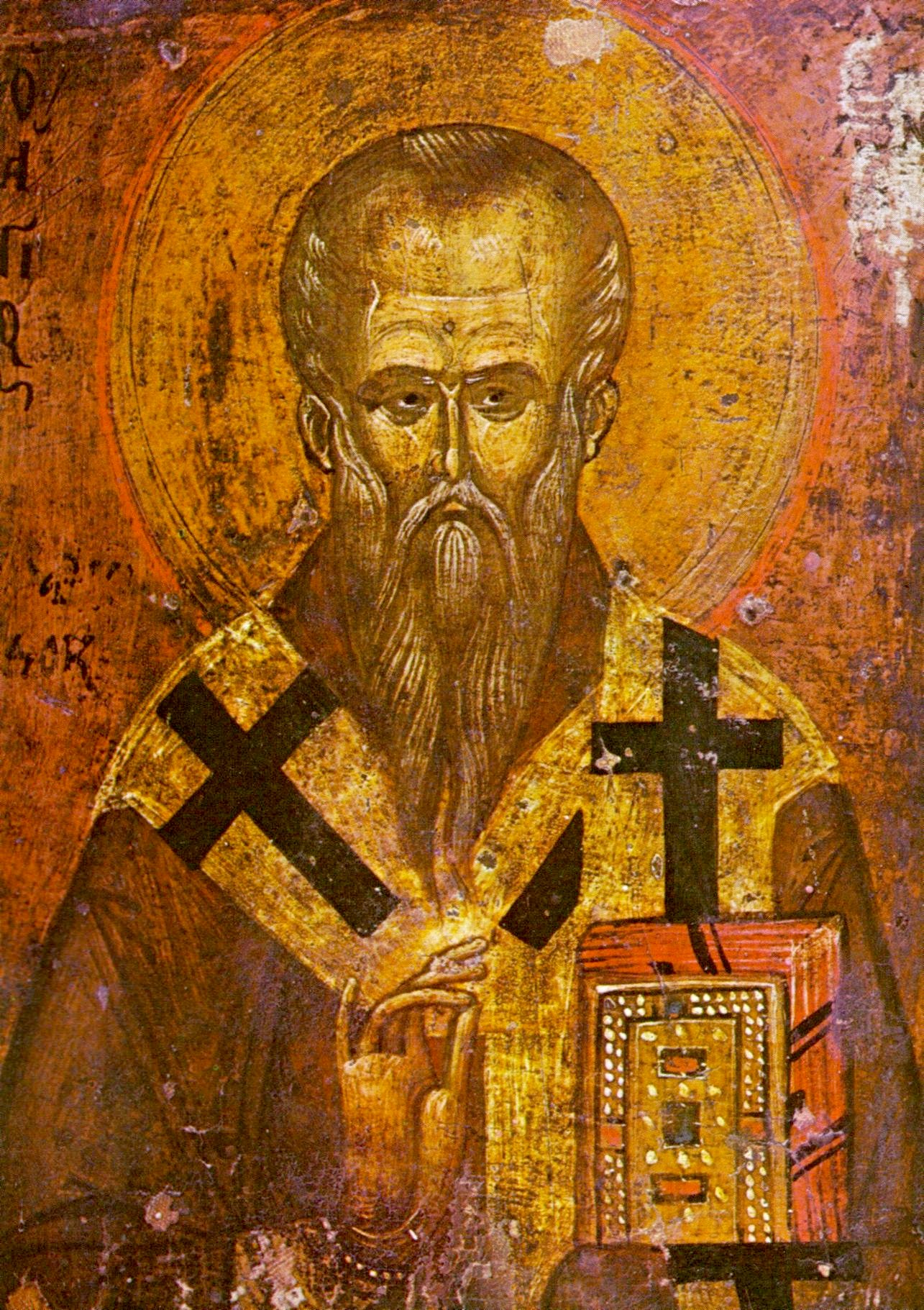
St. Clement of Ohrid.

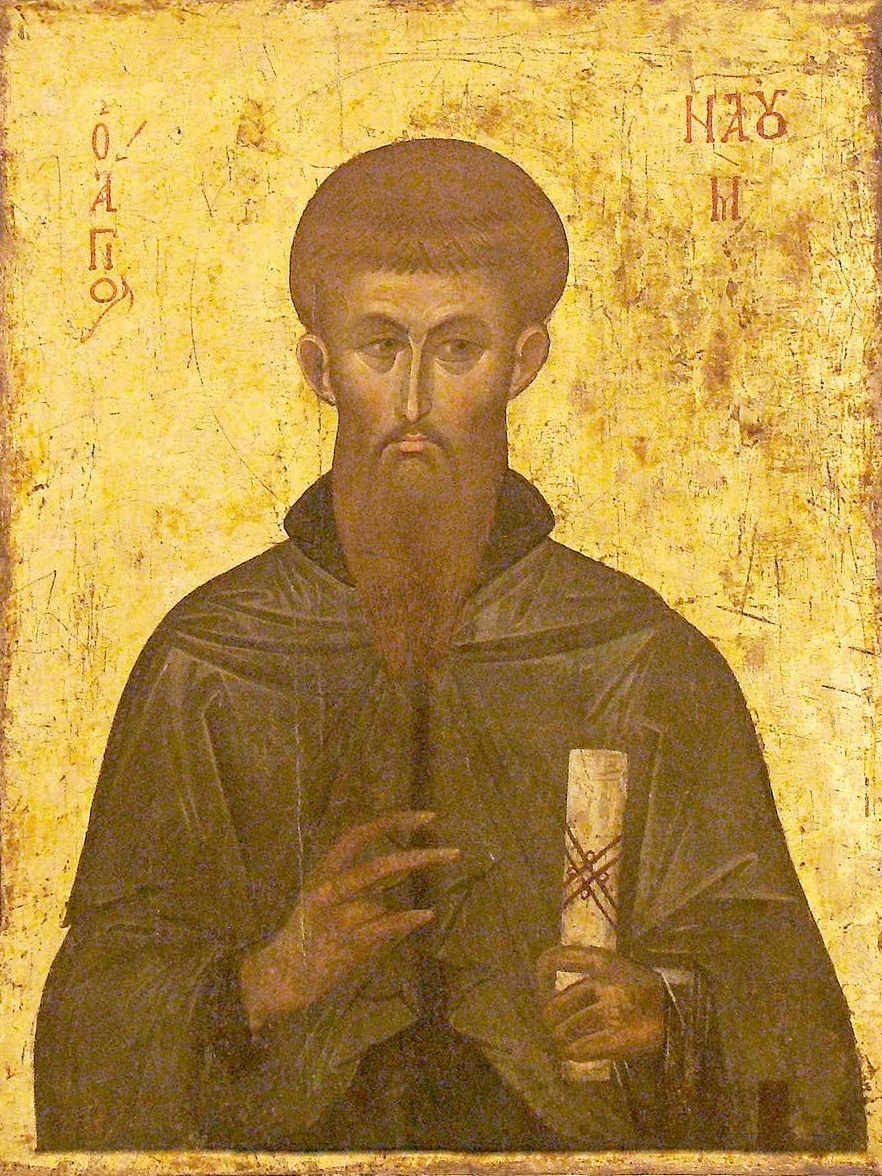
Saint Naum of Preslav.

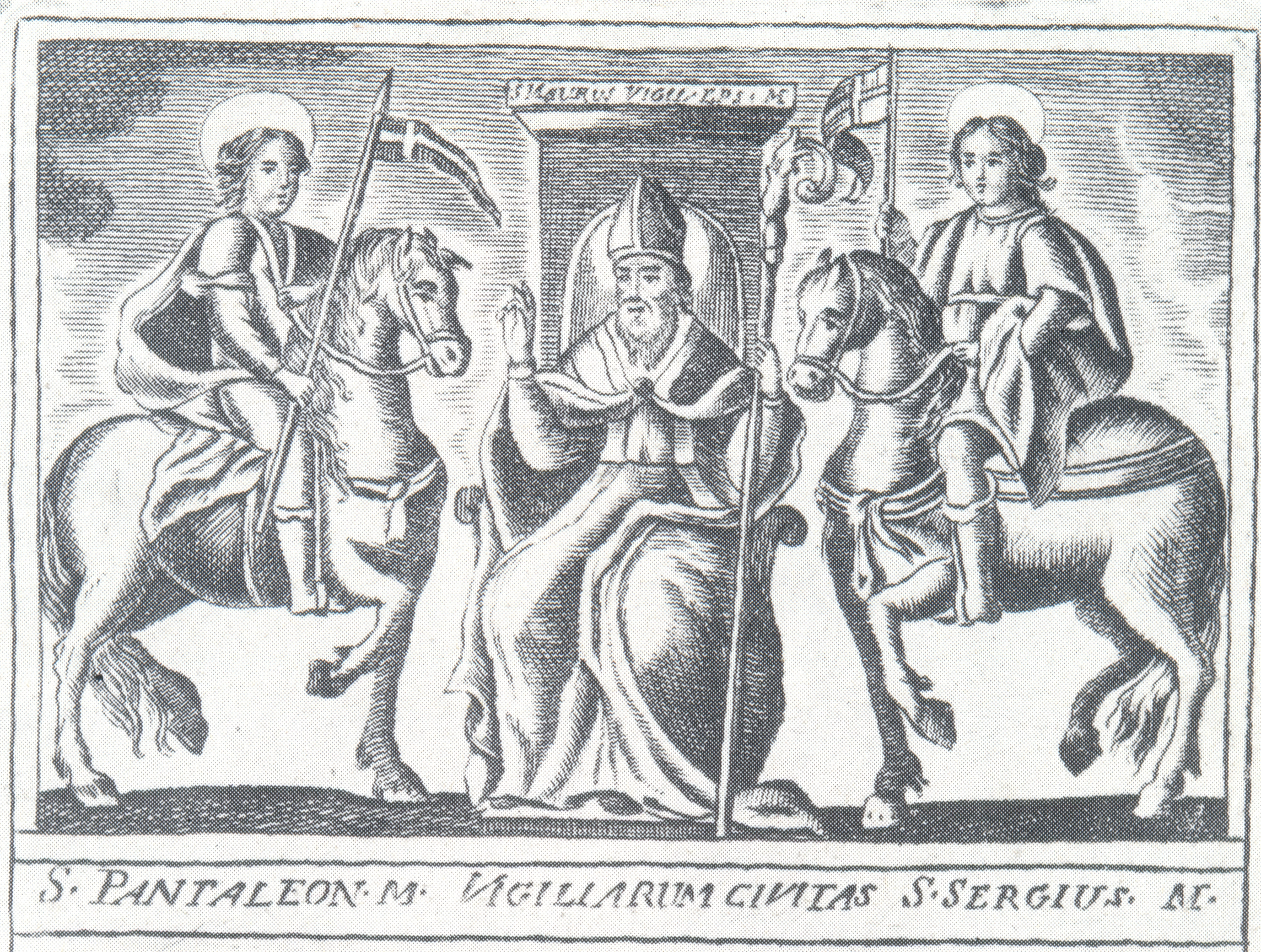
Martyrs Maurus, Pantaleimon and Sergius.

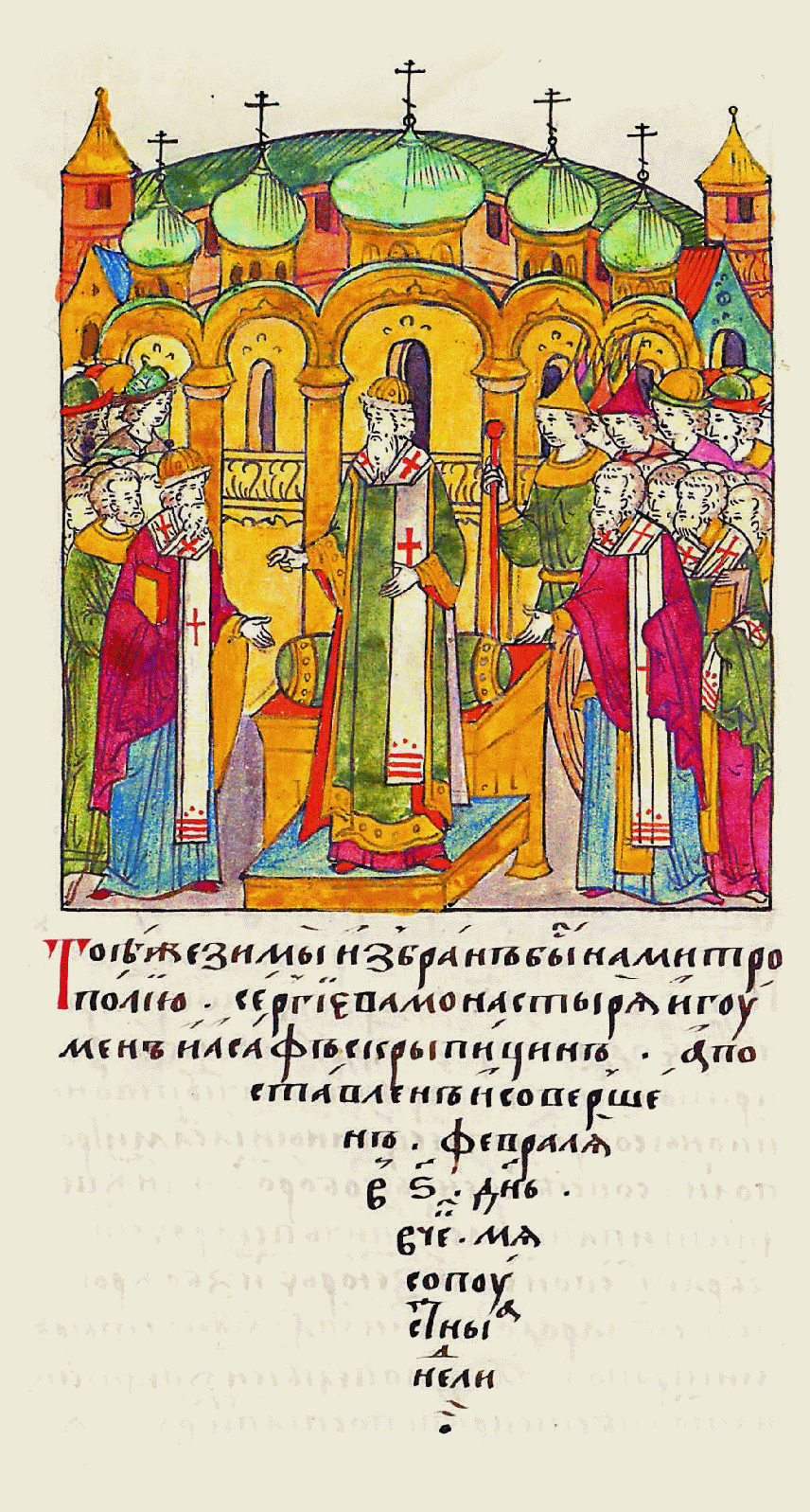
St. Ioasaph of Moscow, Metropolitan of Moscow.

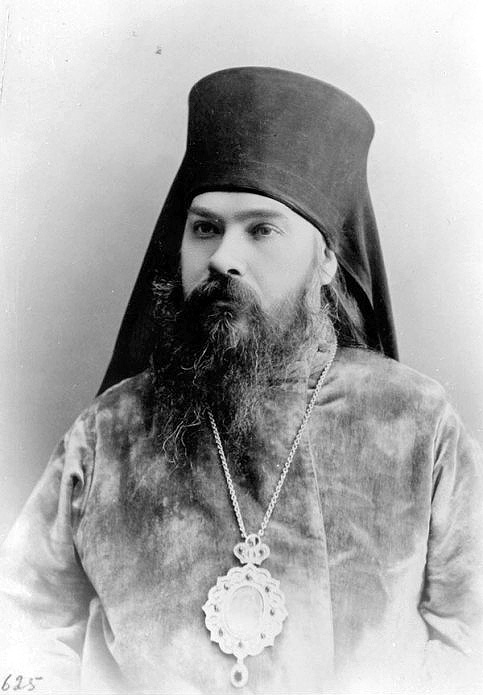
New Hieromartyr Ambrose (Gudko), Bishop of Sarapul.

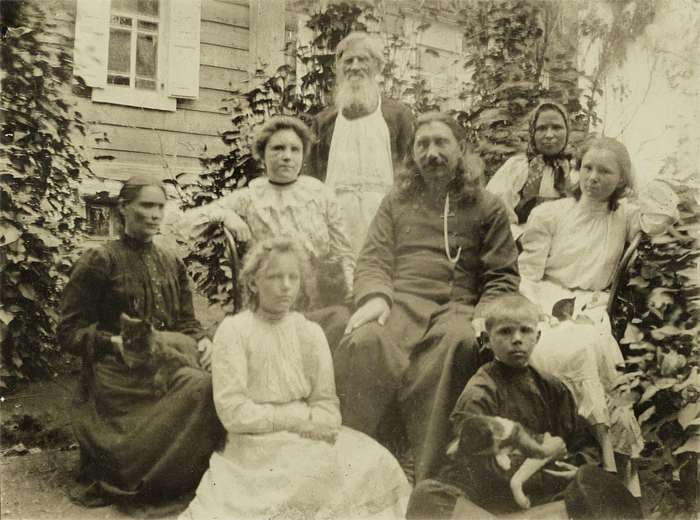
New Hieromartyr Platon Gornykh, with his family.

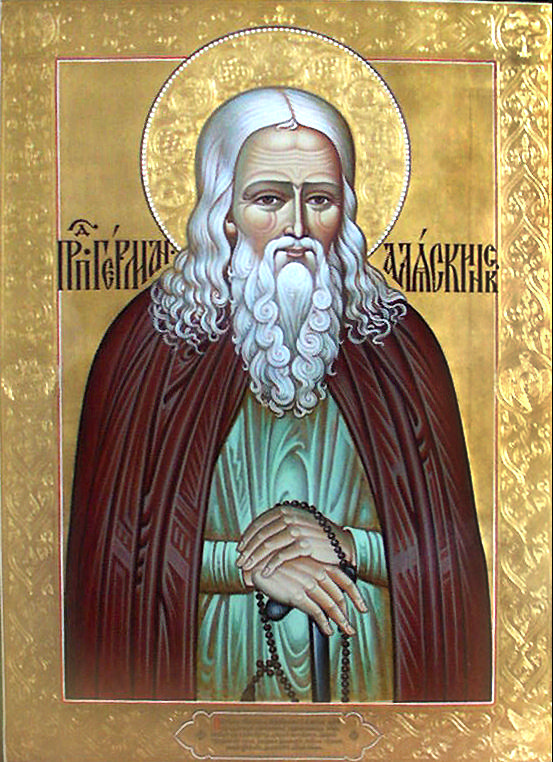
St. Herman of Alaska.

== Sources ==
- July 27/August 9. Orthodox Calendar (PRAVOSLAVIE.RU).
- August 9 / July 27. HOLY TRINITY RUSSIAN ORTHODOX CHURCH (A parish of the Patriarchate of Moscow).
- July 27. OCA - The Lives of the Saints.
- July 27. The Year of Our Salvation - Holy Transfiguration Monastery, Brookline, Massachusetts.
- The Autonomous Orthodox Metropolia of Western Europe and the Americas (ROCOR). St. Hilarion Calendar of Saints for the year of our Lord 2004. St. Hilarion Press (Austin, TX). p. 55.
- The Twenty-Seventh Day of the Month of July. Orthodoxy in China.
- July 27. Latin Saints of the Orthodox Patriarchate of Rome.
- The Roman Martyrology. Transl. by the Archbishop of Baltimore. Last Edition, According to the Copy Printed at Rome in 1914. Revised Edition, with the Imprimatur of His Eminence Cardinal Gibbons. Baltimore: John Murphy Company, 1916. p. 222.
- Rev. Richard Stanton. A Menology of England and Wales, or, Brief Memorials of the Ancient British and English Saints Arranged According to the Calendar, Together with the Martyrs of the 16th and 17th Centuries. London: Burns & Oates, 1892. pp. 362–364.

Greek Sources

- Great Synaxaristes: (in Greek) 27 ΙΟΥΛΙΟΥ. ΜΕΓΑΣ ΣΥΝΑΞΑΡΙΣΤΗΣ.
- (in Greek) Συναξαριστής. 27 Ιουλίου. ECCLESIA.GR. (H ΕΚΚΛΗΣΙΑ ΤΗΣ ΕΛΛΑΔΟΣ).
- (in Greek) 27/07/2026. Ορθόδοξος Συναξαριστής.

Russian Sources

- (in Russian) 9 августа (27 июля). Православная Энциклопедия под редакцией Патриарха Московского и всея Руси Кирилла (электронная версия). (Orthodox Encyclopedia - Pravenc.ru).
- (in Russian) 27 июля по старому стилю / 9 августа по новому стилю. СПЖ "Союз православных журналистов". 2026.
