= Kholmsky =

Kholmsky (masculine), Kholmskaya (feminine), or Kholmskoye (neuter) may refer to:

- Kholmskaya (or Kholmsky), a rural locality (a stanitsa) in Krasnodar Krai, Russia
- Kholmsky District, several districts in Russia
- Daniil Kholmsky (died 1493), Russian military leader
- Vasily Kholmsky (1460s–1524), Russian military leader
- Kholmsky Urban Okrug, a municipal formation which Kholmsky District in Sakhalin Oblast, Russia is incorporated as
- Kholmskoye Urban Settlement, a municipal formation which the town of district significance of Kholm in Kholmsky District of Novgorod Oblast, Russia is incorporated as

== See also ==
- Kholm (disambiguation)
- Kholmsk, a town in Russia
