= Holy fathers slain at Sinai and Raithu =

Saints martyred during the reign of Diocletian

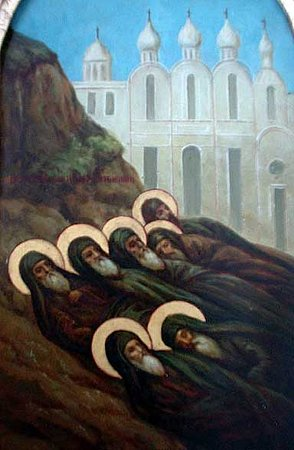
Holy Fathers slain at Sinai and Raithu

The Holy fathers slain at Sinai and Raithu are saints who were martyred in the 4th and 5th centuries. They are venerated together on January 14 by the Eastern Orthodox Church and the Greek Catholic Churches. They are also listed on the same date in the Roman Martyrology of the Roman Catholic Church.

== Background ==
The holy monastic fathers were slain at Sinai and Raithu. There were two occasions when the monks and hermits were murdered by the barbarians. The first took place in the year 312, when forty fathers were killed at Mt. Sinai, and thirty-nine were slain at Raithu on the same day. The attack at Sinai was recorded by an Egyptian monk named Ammon. The attack at Raithu is attributed to the tribe called the Blemmyes, from parts of Arabia.

Their names are given as Isaiah, Sabbas, Moses and his disciple Moses, Jeremiah, Paul, Adam, Sergius, Domnus, Proclus, Hypatius, Isaac, Macarius, Mark, Benjamin, Eusebius, Elias, and others (4th-5th century). They were known to be ascetics, who lived in the wilderness on dates and water.

The martyrs of Raithu were killed about the middle of the 5th century. This was recorded by a monk named Nilus who had managed to escape the attack.
