= Kholmsky District =

Location of Novgorod Oblast in Russia

Location of Sakhalin Oblast in Russia

Kholmsky District is the name of several administrative and municipal districts in Russia

- Kholmsky District, Novgorod Oblast, an administrative and municipal district of Novgorod Oblast
- Kholmsky District, Sakhalin Oblast, an administrative district of Sakhalin Oblast

== See also ==
- Kholmsky (disambiguation)
