= Diocese of Ryazan =

Russian Roman Catholic diocese

Diocese of Ryazan Рязанская епархия
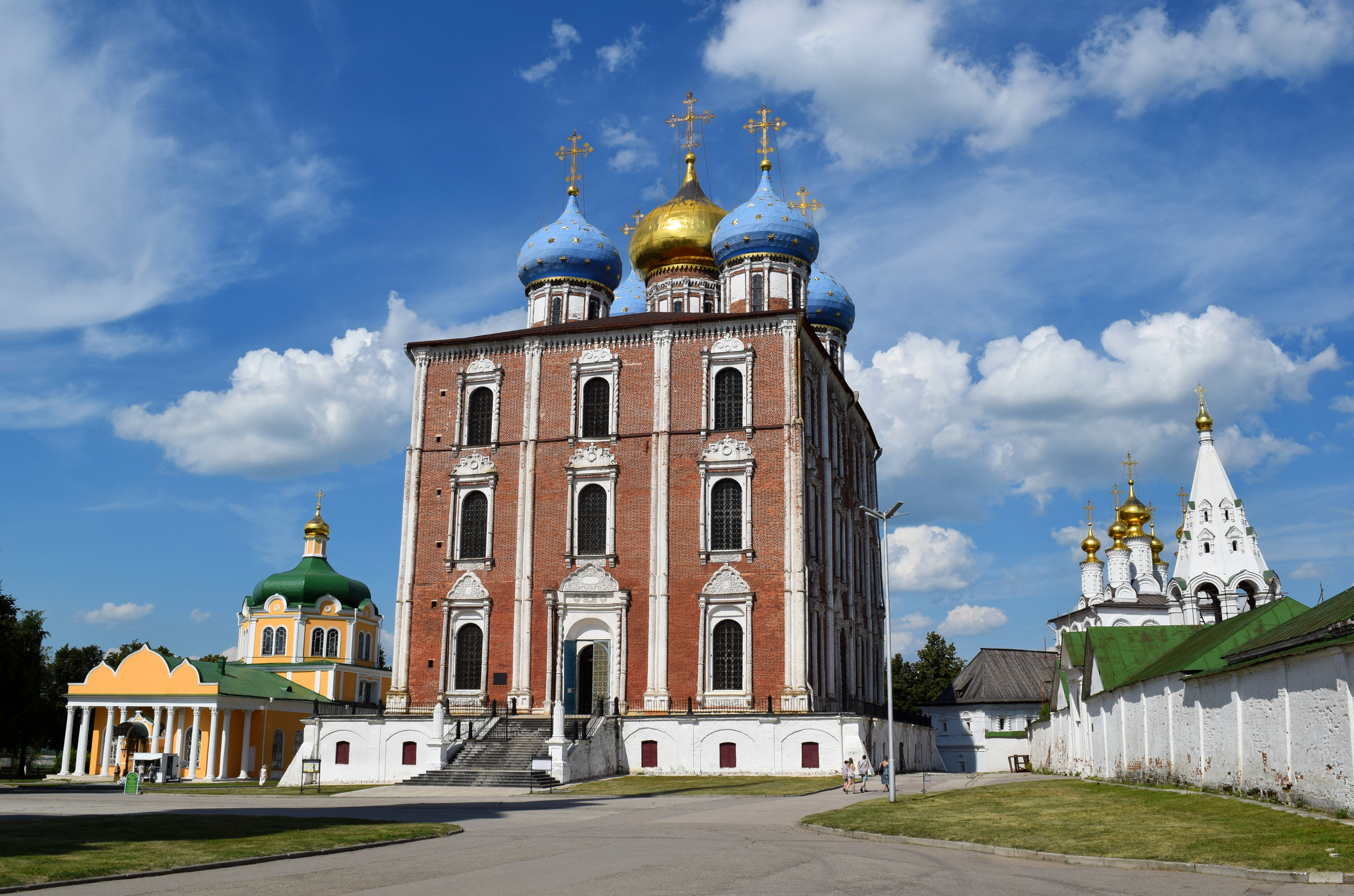
- Assumption Cathedral in Ryazan

Location
- Territory: Ryazan Oblast
- Deaneries: 13
- Headquarters: Ryazan

Information
- Denomination: Eastern Orthodox
- Sui iuris church: Russian Orthodox Church
- Established: 26 September 1198 or 1207
- Cathedral: Nativity Cathedral; Assumption Cathedral
- Language: Old Church Slavonic

Current leadership
- Governance: Eparchy
- Bishop: Mark Golovkov since 22 October 2015

Website
- www.ryazeparh.ru

The Diocese of Ryazan (Russian: Рязанская епархия) is a diocese (eparchy) of the Russian Orthodox Church, uniting parishes and monasteries in the western part of the Ryazan Oblast (within the city of Ryazan, as well as Zakharovsky, Mikhailovsky, Pronsky, Rybnovsky, Ryazansky, Spassky and Starozhilovsky districts). It is part of the Ryazan Metropolitanate.

Established September 26, 1198; according to other sources, in 1207.

== History ==
It was separated from the Chernigov diocese. Initially, the department was located in Murom, but then it was moved to old Ryazan, and after its destruction and desolation - to Pereyaslavl Ryazan, that is, to modern Ryazan. The diocese began to be called Ryazan and Murom.

The importance of the Ryazan diocese in the church and social life of the Russian state grew. From January 26, 1589, the department received the status of an archbishopric, and from June 13, 1669, to 1723, a metropolitanate. Under the Ryazan metropolitans, the Assumption Cathedral was built in the Ryazan Kremlin.

When in 1764, under Catherine II, Murom was assigned to the Vladimir diocese, the diocese began to be called Ryazan and Shatsk. In turn, when in 1799 Shatsk was assigned to the Tambov diocese, and Zaraisk became part of the Ryazan diocese, the diocese was called Ryazan and Zaraisk.

After the October Revolution in 1917, widespread destruction of church life began. At the end of the 1930s, there was no ruling bishop in Ryazan, all monasteries and parochial schools were closed, services were held in a few churches, the rest were destroyed or closed by the authorities. Only after the Patriotic War of 1941-1945 did diocesan life begin to improve somewhat, and after 1988 - to fully revive. Under the conditions of Khrushchev's anti-religious campaign, the Ryazan diocese maintained high income - in 1962 it received 356,207 rubles of net income. At the same time, the diocese contributed large sums to the Peace Fund - in 1962 125,000 rubles, in 1963 already 190,000 rubles. The population of the Ryazan Oblast actively helped the churches. For example, in 1965, believers brought 1.5 tons of flour, 710 m^{2} of fabric and 890 towels and scarves to the temples.

On October 5, 2011, Diocese of Kasimov and Diocese of Skopin were separated from the Diocese of Ryazan. On October 6, 2011, the Metropolinate of Ryazan was formed within the Ryazan Oblast, which includes the Kasimov, Ryazan and Skopin dioceses.

== Deaneries ==
The diocese is divided into 13 ecclesiastical districts (as of October 2022):

- 1st deanery of the city of Kursk
- 2nd deanery of the city of Kursk
- Belovskoye Deanery
- Greater Soldiers' Deanery
- Zolotukhinsky deanery
- Korenevskoe deanery
- Kursk deanery
- Kurchatov Deanery
- Medvensky deanery
- Oboyan Deanery
- Ponyrovsky deanery
- Rila Deanery
- Sudzhan Deanery

== Bishops ==
- Arseny (1198–1213)
- Euphrosynus the Holy Mountain (1225–1237)
- Joseph I (mentioned 1284)[4]
- Basil I (c. 1291–1294)
- Stephen (mentioned 1303)
- Savva (mentioned 1304)
- Mitrofan
- Gregory (1326 - previously 1334)
- Evfimy
- Theodul
- Michael (mentioned 1334)
- Cyril (ment. 1334)
- Joseph II (mentioned 1340)
- George (1340)
- Vasily II (1354–1360)
- Athanasius (1360–1378)
- Vassian (mentioned 1379)
- Theoktist (1385–1387)
- Theognostus I (August 15, 1387 – 1389)
- Jeremiah the Greek (1389–1392)
- Theognostus II (1393–1407)*
- Euphrosynus I (mentioned 1410)
- Sergius (Azakov) (1423–1427)
- Joseph II (mentioned 1430)
- Jonah (Odnoushev) (1431–1448)
- Euphrosynus (Zvenets) (1448 - end of 1461)
- David (February 1, 1462 – 1471)
- Theodosius (December 8, 1471 – 1481)
- Simeon (1481–1496)
- Protasius (December 18, 1496 – 1516)
- Sergius II (February 12, 1517 – 1521)
- Jonah II (March 23, 1522 - early 1548)
- Michael (April 22, 1548 - early 1551)
- Cassian (beginning 1551–1554)
- Gury (Luzhetsky) (March 17, 1554 - April/May 1562)
- Philotheus (1562–1568)
- Sergius III (autumn 1569–1572)
- Theodosius (Vyatka) (1572)
- Leonid (Protasyev) (1573–1586)
- Mitrofan (1586–1598)
- Varlaam (July 1598 - February 17, 1601)
- Ignatius the Cypriot (1602 - June 30, 1605)
- Theodoret (August 1605 - September 10, 1617)
- Joseph III (January 10, 1619 – 1621)
- Anthony (5 May 1621 - 15 February 1637)
- Moses (January 10, 1638 – February 15, 1651)
- Misail (April 13, 1651 - April 19, 1655)
- Hilarion (Yakovlev) (June 5, 1657 - June 6, 1673)
- Joseph IV (August 9, 1674 – September 21, 1681)
- Paul (Moravian) (November 1681 - September 4, 1686)
- Abraham (January 9, 1687 - March 1700)
- Stefan (Jaworski) (April 7, 1700 - November 27, 1722)
- Sylvester (Kholmsky) (February 3, 1723 - August 1725)
- Anthony (Ierofeich) (1725 - April 19, 1726) named
- Gabriel (Buzhinsky) (July 14, 1726 - April 27, 1731)
- Lavrenty (Gorka) (July 1731 - September 26, 1733)
- Alexy (Titov) (September 26, 1733 - September 17, 1750)
- Dmitry (Sechenov) (June 21, 1752 - October 22, 1757)
- Palladium (Yuryev) (June 18, 1758 - March 20, 1778)
- Simon (Lagov) (March 31, 1778 - January 17, 1804)
- Ambrose (Yakovlev-Orlin) (January 29, 1804 - January 26, 1809)
- Theophylact (Rusanov) (March 5, 1809 - May 14, 1817)
- Sergius (Krylov-Platonov) (June 4, 1817 - August 18, 1824)
- Filaret (Amphitheaters) (January 12, 1825 - February 25, 1828)
- Grigory (Postnikov) (March 3, 1828 - July 25, 1831)
- Evgeny (Kazantsev) (August 7, 1831 - May 9, 1837)
- Gabriel (Gorodkov) (July 15, 1837 - May 10, 1858)
- Smaragd (Kryzhanovsky) (June 5, 1858 - November 11, 1863)
- Irinarh (Popov) (December 20, 1863 - August 29, 1867)
- Alexy (Rzhanitsyn) (November 28, 1867 - September 9, 1876)
- Palladium (Raev) (September 9, 1876 - August 21, 1882)
- Feoktist (Popov) (September 28, 1882 - December 2, 1894)
- Justin (Polyansky) (December 10, 1894 - October 14, 1896)
- Meletiy (Yakimov) (October 14, 1896 - January 14, 1900)
- Polievkt (Pyaskovsky) (January 22, 1900 - November 7, 1902)
- Arkady (Karpinsky) (December 18, 1902 - November 3, 1906)
- Nikodim (Bokov) (November 3, 1906 - July 25, 1911)
- Dimitry (Sperovsky) (July 25, 1911 - June 17, 1917)
- Modest (Nikitin) (May 8 - October 9, 1917), military
- John (Smirnov) (November 20, 1917 - October 14, 1919)
- Veniamin (Muratovsky) (July 13, 1920 – 1922)
- Ambrose (Smirnov) (1923 - November 15, 1923)
- Boris (Sokolov) (October 16, 1923 - February 21, 1928)
- Yuvenally (Maslovsky) (May 10, 1928 - October 25, 1937), from the moment of his arrest in January 1936, was deprived of the opportunity to serve in the diocese
- 1937-1942 - the position was vacant
- Alexy (Sergeev) (July 13, 1942 - May 1944)
- Dimitry (Gradusov) (May 26, 1944 - January 13, 1947)
- Jerome (Zakharov) (January 13, 1947 - February 27, 1948)
- Filaret (Lebedev) (May 9, 1948 - March 27, 1951)
- Nikolai (Chufarovsky) (March 27, 1951 - May 14, 1963)
- Palladium (Kaminsky) (May 14, 1963 - February 5, 1965)
- Boris (Skvortsov) (February 21, 1965 - August 11, 1972)
- Simon (Novikov) (October 14, 1972 - May 7, 2003)
- Pavel (Ponomarev) (May 7, 2003 - December 25, 2013)
- Veniamin (Zaritsky) (December 25, 2013 - October 22, 2015)
- Mark (Golovkov) (from October 22, 2015)
