= El Tor, Egypt =

El Tor الطور
- City
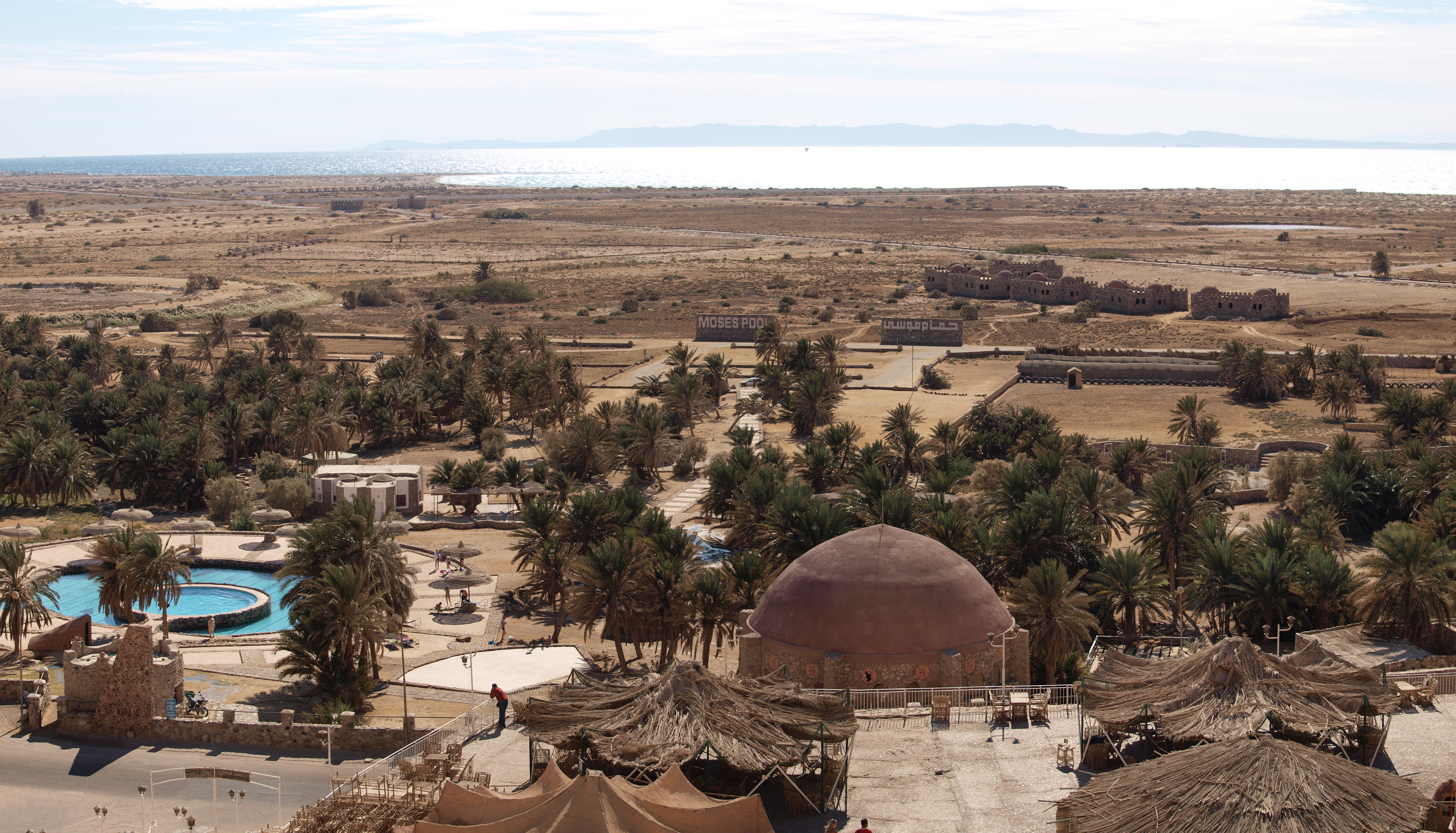
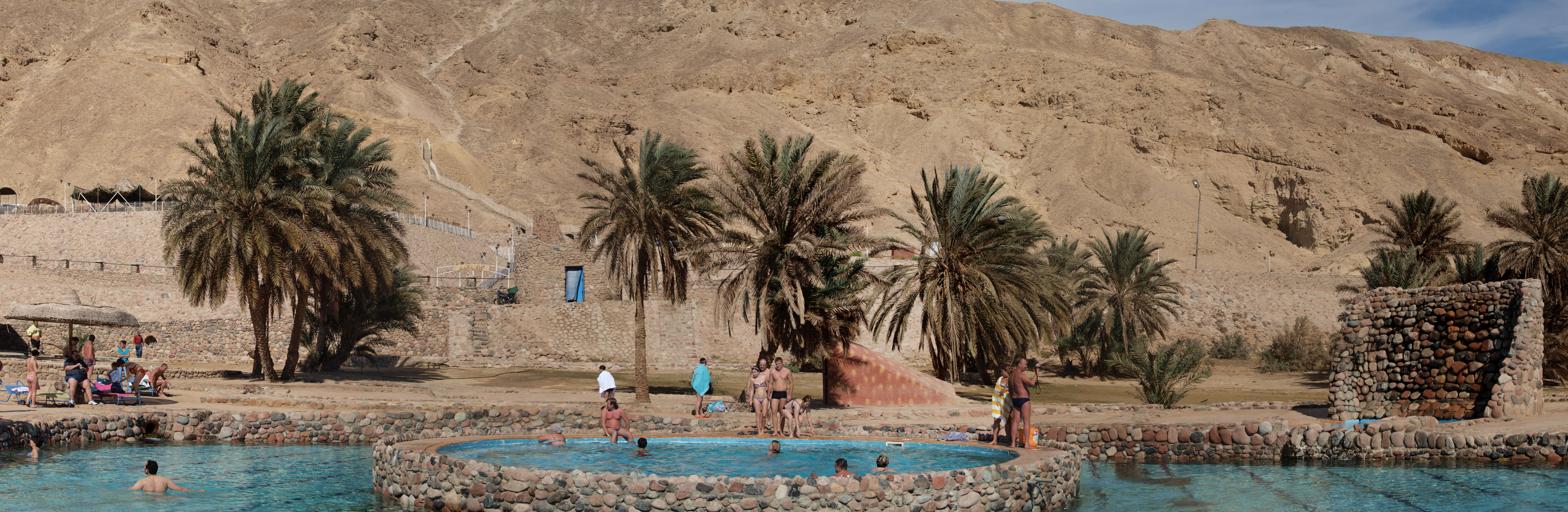
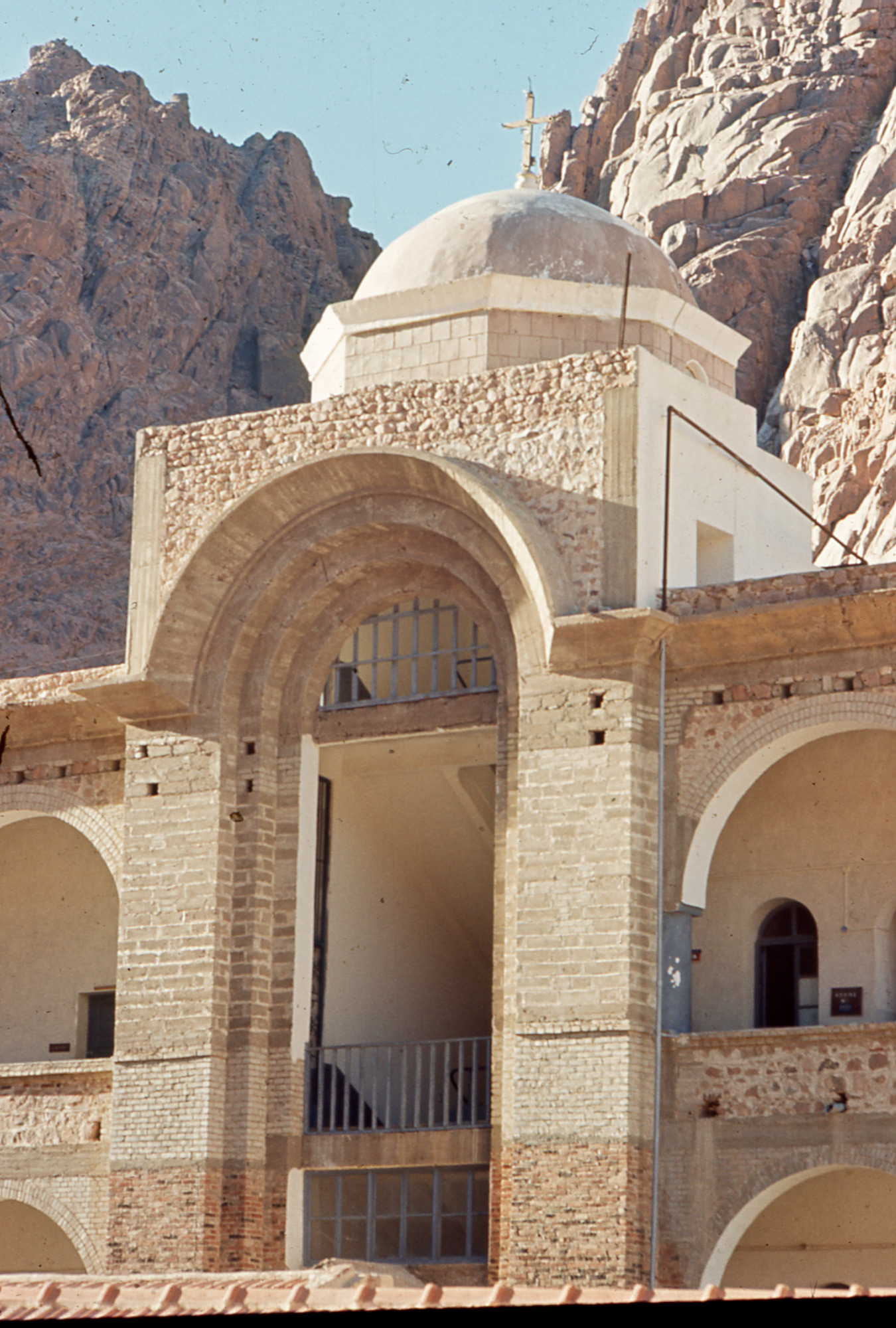
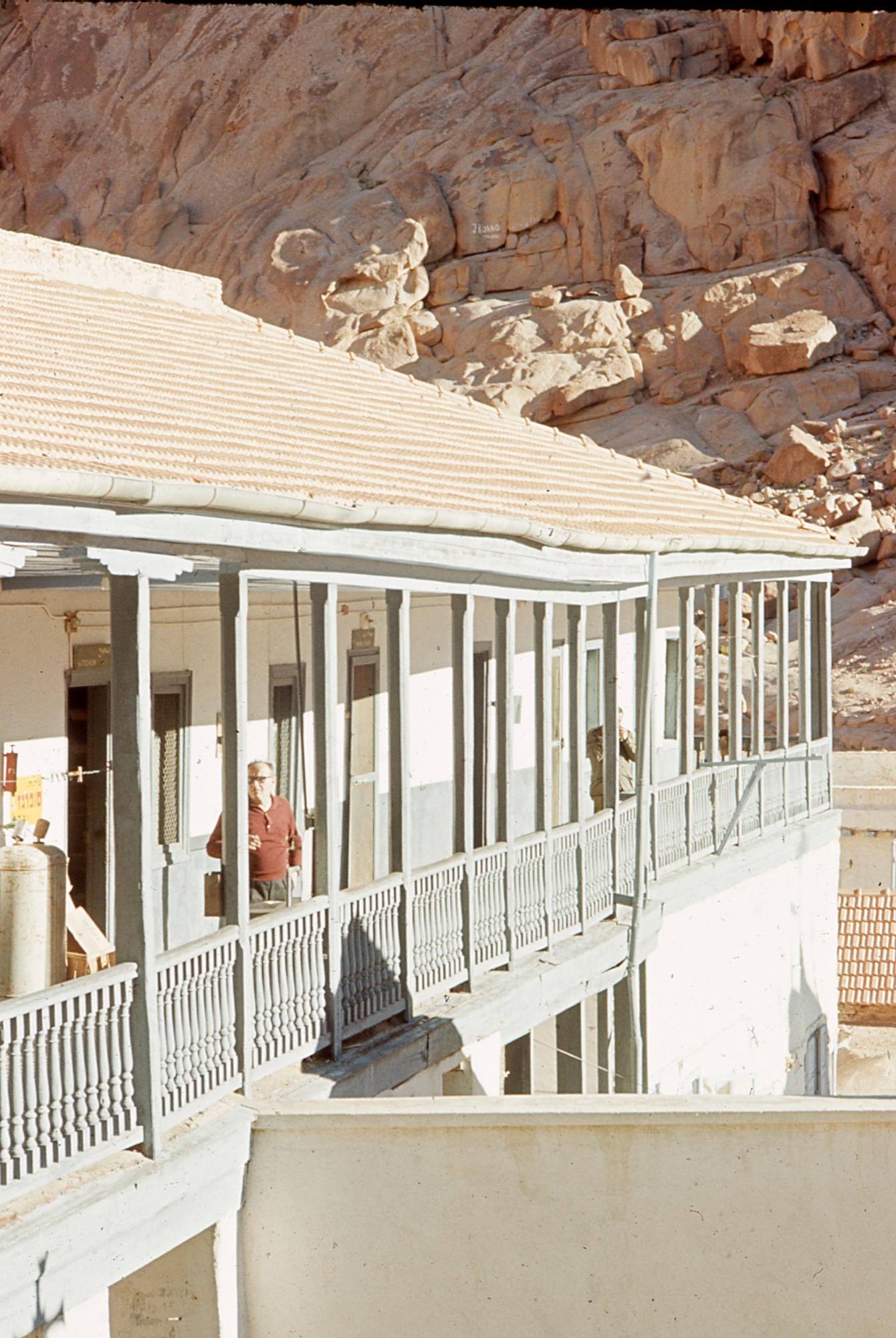
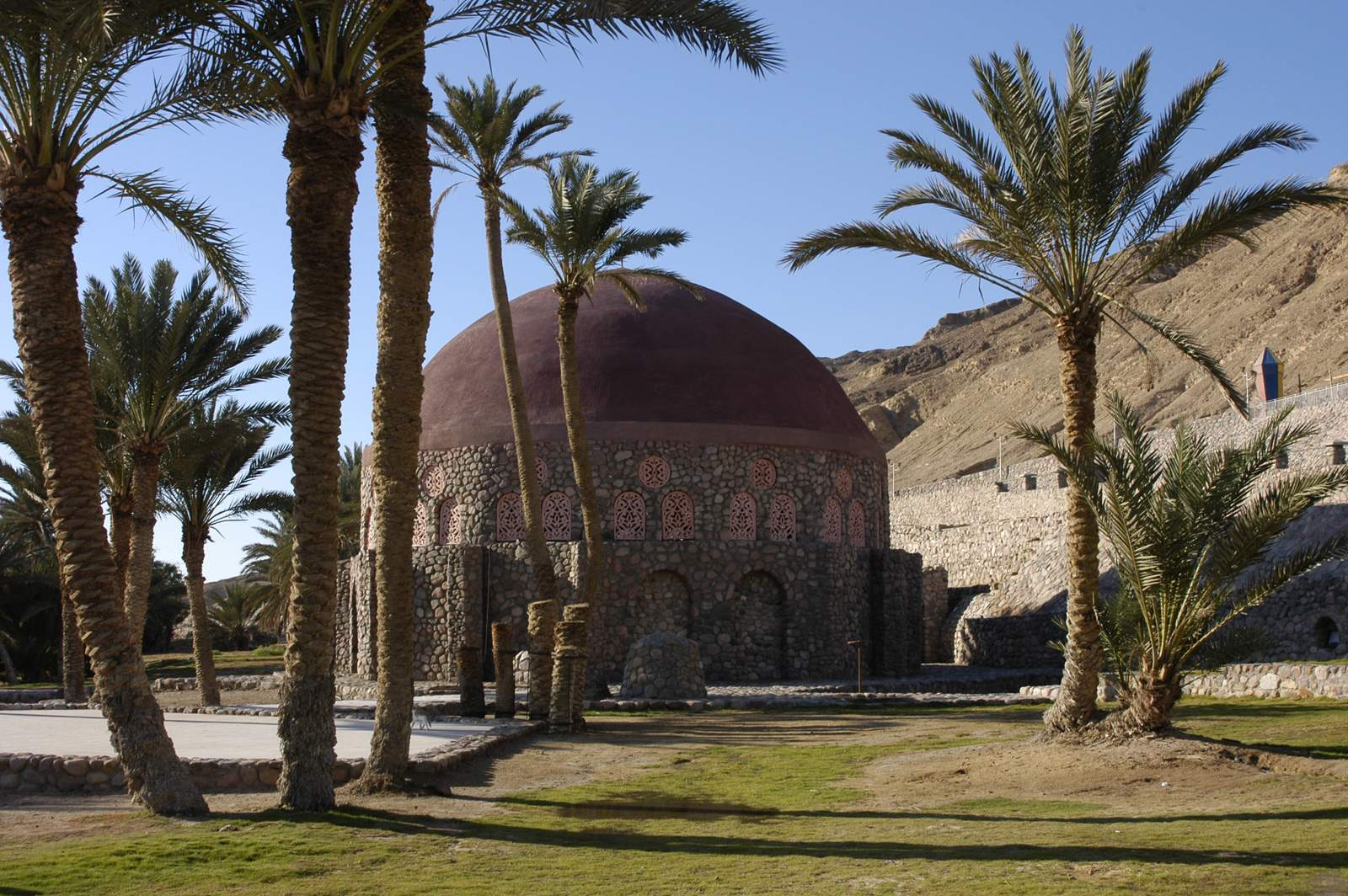
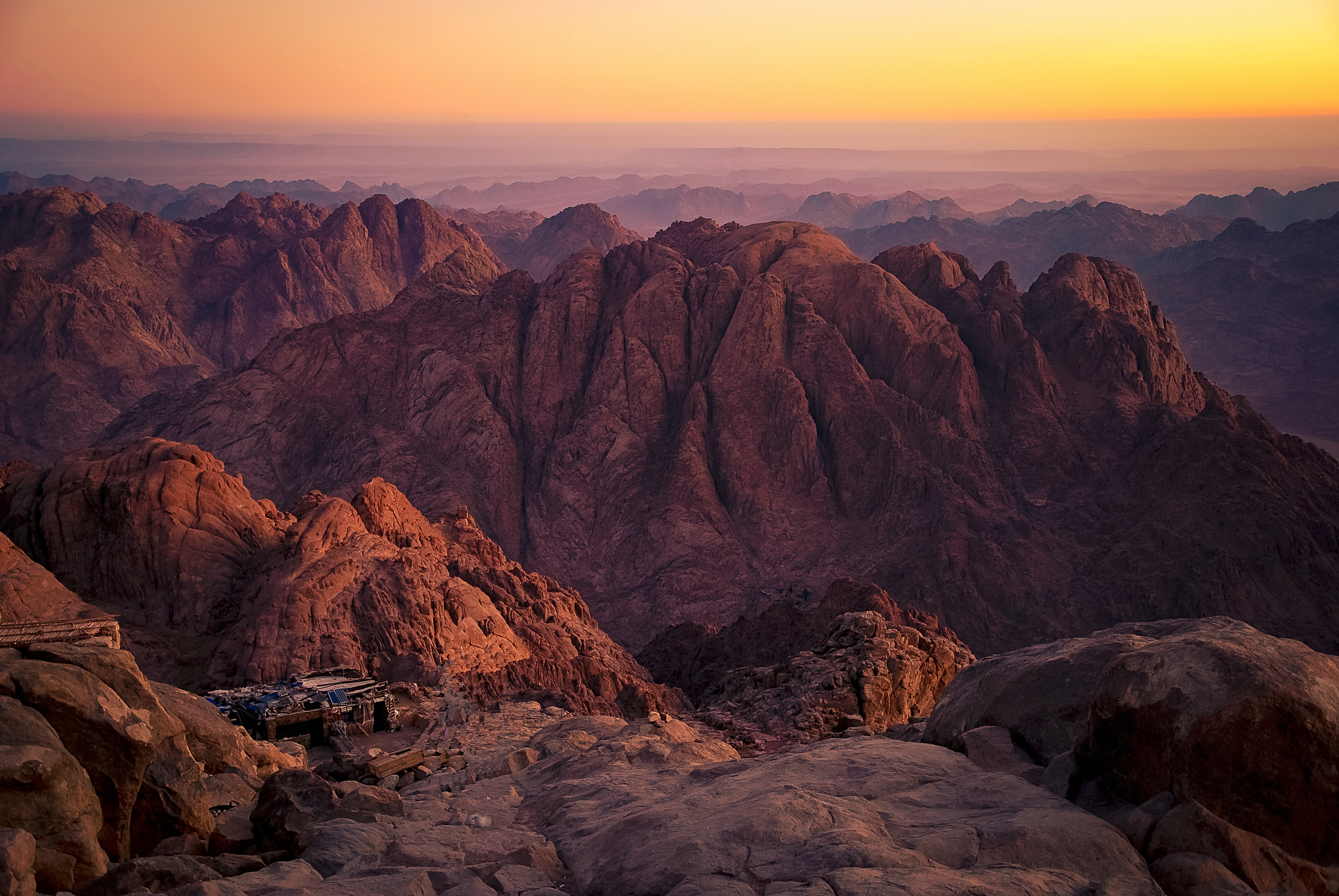

- Location in Egypt El Tor (Africa)
- Coordinates: 28°14′30″N 33°37′20″E
- Country: Egypt
- Governorate: South Sinai

Area
  - Total: 2,581 km^{2} (997 sq mi)
- Elevation: 14 m (46 ft)

Population (2021)
  - Total: 43,720
  - Density: 16.94/km^{2} (43.87/sq mi)
- Time zone: UTC+2 (EST)
- Area code: (+20) 377

El Tor (Egyptian Arabic: الطور aṭ-Ṭūr/et-Ṭūr Egyptian Arabic pronunciation: [etˈtˤuːɾ]), also romanized as Al-Tur and At-Tur and known as Tur Sinai, formerly Raithu, is a city and the capital of the South Sinai Governorate of Egypt. The name of the city comes from the Arabic term for the mountain where the prophet Moses is believed to have received the Tablets of the Law from God; this mountain is designated Jabal Al Tor.

At-Tur itself appears to have been founded in the 13th century near the site of the ancient Raythou (medieval Raya). The El tor strain of cholera was discovered there in 1905. It was a quarantine camp for Muslim pilgrims returning from Hajj (the Islamic pilgrimage to Mecca). Known for its springs, the city is an important tourist destination in the South Sinai Governorate along with Sharm El Sheikh and Saint Catherine.

== History ==
=== Monastery ===
The Raithu desert is situated around El Tor, between Saint Catherine and the Red Sea. It is part of the Archdiocese of Mount Sinai and Raithu of the Eastern Orthodox Patriarchate of Jerusalem. The "Martyrs of Raithu" were 43 anchorites (early Christian hermits) murdered by bedouins (desert dwellers) during the reign of Emperor Diocletian (284-305CE). Christian monks fleeing persecutions had been present since the 3rd century, and the Raithu monastery (or Rutho) was commissioned in the 6th century by Byzantine emperor Justinian. The latter was proposed as a UNESCO World Heritage site on November 1, 1994, in the Cultural category. Theodore of Raithu was champion of neo-Chalcedonism in the early 7th century.

=== Portuguese attack ===
En route to Suez with the objective to seek and destroy the Ottoman fleet, a Portuguese Armada was sent in 1541 to Red Sea.

After several days sailing, the commander Estevão da Gama gave the order to direct a surprise attack. The troops were able to disembark and the defenders came out to the shore but were pushed to the city not managing to close the city doors. The Portuguese as the city fell, were ready to loot, but two priests came to the Commander, and appealed to him avoiding the destruction. Several soldiers were armed Knights after a mass, and the armada stayed for a few days preparing to sail and attack Suez.

=== Modern Egypt ===
El Tor was captured by Israel during the Six-Day War of 1967. It was returned to Egypt, along with the rest of the Sinai Peninsula, following the 1979 Egypt–Israel peace treaty.

== Geography ==
=== Climate ===
Its climate is classified by Köppen-Geiger system as hot desert (BWh).

Climate data for El Tor
Month	Jan	Feb	Mar	Apr	May	Jun	Jul	Aug	Sep	Oct	Nov	Dec	Year
Record high °C (°F)	28.8 (83.8)	29.7 (85.5)	35.9 (96.6)	38.9 (102.0)	42.6 (108.7)	42.4 (108.3)	42.5 (108.5)	40.5 (104.9)	38.2 (100.8)	35.6 (96.1)	31.7 (89.1)	28.7 (83.7)	42.6 (108.7)
Mean daily maximum °C (°F)	20.9 (69.6)	21.9 (71.4)	24.2 (75.6)	28.0 (82.4)	31.0 (87.8)	32.3 (90.1)	33.2 (91.8)	33.3 (91.9)	31.0 (87.8)	28.2 (82.8)	25.3 (77.5)	22.3 (72.1)	27.6 (81.7)
Daily mean °C (°F)	16.1 (61.0)	17.0 (62.6)	19.9 (67.8)	23.4 (74.1)	26.2 (79.2)	27.9 (82.2)	28.9 (84.0)	29.1 (84.4)	27.6 (81.7)	24.5 (76.1)	20.7 (69.3)	17.4 (63.3)	23.2 (73.8)
Mean daily minimum °C (°F)	9.5 (49.1)	10.2 (50.4)	13.5 (56.3)	17.2 (63.0)	20.3 (68.5)	23.1 (73.6)	24.0 (75.2)	24.8 (76.6)	23.2 (73.8)	19.1 (66.4)	14.4 (57.9)	11.4 (52.5)	17.6 (63.7)
Record low °C (°F)	2.6 (36.7)	4.2 (39.6)	5.6 (42.1)	8.8 (47.8)	13.2 (55.8)	18.4 (65.1)	20.3 (68.5)	20.7 (69.3)	17.2 (63.0)	10.5 (50.9)	7.0 (44.6)	5.8 (42.4)	2.6 (36.7)
Average precipitation mm (inches)	0 (0)	0 (0)	0 (0)	0 (0)	0 (0)	0 (0)	0 (0)	0 (0)	0 (0)	1 (0.0)	1 (0.0)	5 (0.2)	7 (0.3)
Average precipitation days (≥ 1.0 mm)	0	0	0	0	0	0	0	0	0	0	0	0.1	0.1
Average relative humidity (%)	53	51	53	55	56	57	59	63	66	61	58	55	57.2
Source 1: NOAA
Source 2: Climate Charts

== See also ==
- List of cities and towns in Egypt
