= Bisceglia =

Bisceglia is an Italian surname. Notable people with the surname include:

- Christian Bisceglia (born 1967), Italian film director and screenwriter
- Marco Bisceglia (1925–2001), Italian pro-gay priest
- Michel Bisceglia (born 1970), Belgian musician
- Pat Bisceglia (1930–2009), American football player
- Vitangelo Bisceglia (1749–1822), Italian agronomist and botanist
