= Ambrose Gudko =

Saint Ambrose of Sarapul
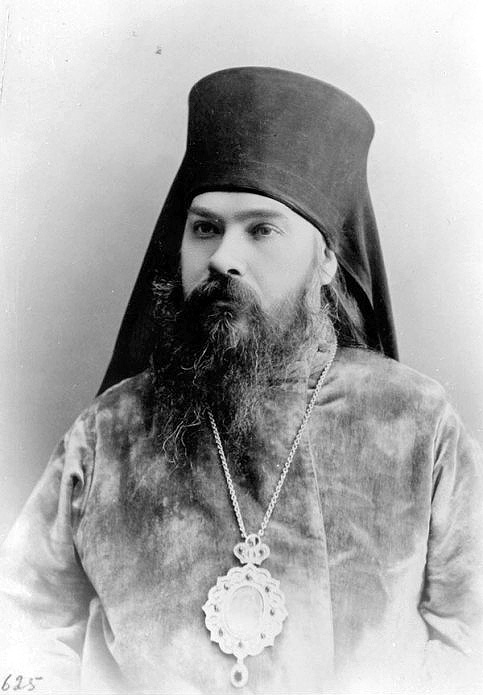

Bishop of Sarapul and Yelabuga, Hieromartyr
- Born: Vasiliy Ivanovich Gudko; December 28, 1867; Kholm Governorate, Russian Empire
- Died: August 9, 1918 (aged 50); Sarapul, Russia
- Venerated in: Russian Orthodox Church
- Canonized: 2000 by Jubilee Bishops' Council
- Feast: August 9

Bishop Ambrose (secular name Vasiliy Ivanovich Gudko, Russian: Василий Иванович Гудко; December 28, 1867 – August 9, 1918) was bishop of Sarapul and Yelabuga. He was canonized as a Russian Saint by the Russian Orthodox Church in 2000. He was killed during the Red Terror.

== Education ==
He graduated the Kholm Ecclesiastical Seminary and the St. Petersburg Ecclesiastical Academy in 1893 with a Master's Degree in Theology.

== Monk, Missionary, Teacher ==
- 1891 invested into monastic life.
- May 30, 1893, ordained a hieromonk.
- 1893 headmaster of the catechist school in Altay.
- 1897 head of the Korean Ecclesiastical Mission in position of archimandrite.
- 1899 superintendent of the Donskoy Ecclesiastical School in Moscow.
- 1901 rector of the Volyn Theological Seminary.

== Vicarious bishop ==
- On April 30, 1904, consecrated Krementsky Bishop, Vicar of the Volyn Diocese.
- On February 27, 1909, Baltsky Bishop, Vicar of the Podolsky Diocese.
- On February 14, 1914, Sarapul Bishop, Vicar of the Vyatsky Diocese.
- On October 5, 1916, Sarapul and Elabug Bishop, Vicar of the Vyatsky Diocese. (In this period, the Synod considered the question of dividing the Sarapul Vicariate into an independent Diocese, but that was not decided before the February Revolution.)

At the end of 1916 there began a conflict between some of Sarapul's social democrats and Bishop Ambrosius, as a result of which the bishop excluded Sarapul's liberal figures Mikhel (trustee of the Nikolaevsky Church Parish school) and Polyakov from Holy Communion. He was considered a supporter of the active preaching of Christianity among the Tatar population. He came out with sermons against alcohol; with his blessing, district brotherhoods for the fight against drunkenness were established in Sarapul and Elabug.
