= Kholm Governorate =

Kholm Governorate may refer to:

- Kholm Governorate (Russian Empire), a region of the Russian Empire in 1912–1915, centered in Kholm (today Chełm in Poland)
- Kholm Governorate (Ukraine), a region of the Ukrainian State in 1918–1919, centered in Brest-Litovsk
