= Chronology of early Christian monasticism =

This is a partial chronology of early Christian monasticism with its notable events listed. It covers 343 years.

Christian monasticism first appeared in Egypt and Syria.

Locations of significant monastic sites.

== Chronology ==
Year (AD)	Historical event
c. 227	Paul the Great is born. He is considered to be the very first Christian eremitic ascetic. He lived very reclusively and was only discovered by Anthony towards the end of his life.
249-51	Persecution of Christians under Emperor Decius forces many Christians to flee into the desert (including Paul the Great), thus starting Egyptian Christian monasticism.
c. 251	Anthony the Great is born, who is considered to have founded eremitic monasticism.
mid-3rd century	Chariton the Confessor is born (died c. 350), founder of monastic life in the Judaean desert and of the lavra-type monastic settlement (founded 3 lavras).
c. 285	Cronius of Nitria is born.
c. 290	Pachomius the Great is born, who is considered to have founded cenobitic monasticism.
291/292	Hilarion the Great is born, who was inspired by Anthony.
293	Athanasius the Great is born. His writings are important for the start of Christian monasticism.
c. 300	Macarius the Great is born.
303	Christian persecution under emperor Diocletian: the Diocletianic Persecution.
305	Anthony the Great relocates from the Outer Mountain to the Inner Mountain of Pispir.
306	Constantine the Great becomes the emperor of Western Rome.; Ephrem the Syrian, the "teacher of repentance", is born.
c. 310-20	Athanasius the Great begins his ecclesiastical career.
313	The Edict of Milan legalizes Christianity and ends persecution.
314	Theodorus of Tabennese (spiritual successor of Poemen) is born.; Pachomius the Great is baptized.
c. 315	Amoun of Nitria begins his monastic life.; Epiphanius is born.
c. 320	Death of Amoun (according to Athanasius' history of Anthony the Great).; Pachomius the Great establishes a monastic community in Tabennisis.
320	Pishoy is born.
c. 323	Pachomius the Great founds a monastery at Tabennisi with more than 100 monks and a monastery at Pabau. He also creates the cenobitic system of monastic governance in which the monks are subject to an abbot.; Pishoy is born.
324	Constantine the Great becomes the sole emperor of all of Rome.
325	First Ecumenical Council of Nicaea.
328	Athanasius the Great becomes Archbishop of Alexandria.
329	Basil the Great is born. He influences Christian monasticism by his ascetic writings.
330	Moses the Black is born.; Macarius the Great establishes a monastic settlement in Scetis (which at its peak had 700 individual monasteries).; Amun establishes a monastic settlement in Nitria.
337	Death of Emperor Constantine (as a Christian).
338	2nd exile of Athanasius the Great.; Monks from Nitria move 20 kilometers away and establish the monastic settlement of Kellia.
339	John the Dwarf is born in Thebes.
c. 340	Pambo (disciple of Anthony) founds many monasteries in Scetis.; Anthony the Great learns of Paul the Great in a vision and finds him before he dies, as recorded by Jerome.; 1st exile of Athanasius the Great that lasts six years. During this time, Athanasius, through his writings, brings ideas from eastern Christian monasticism to western Christianity.; Poemen is born.; Hilarion founds a hermitage close to his native town of Thabatha, starting monasticism in Gaza and Palestine.
c. 341	Death of Paul the Great in Thebes.
c. 345	Rufinus is born.
346	Death of Pachomius the Great.
c. 347	Jerome is born.
347	John Chrysostom is born.
356	Death of Anthony the Great at age 105. Sisoes the Great relocates to the mountain of Anthony.; 3rd exile of Athanasius the Great.
357	Athanasius the Great writes his biography of Anthony the Great.
c. 358	Death of Serapion of Nitria.
360	John Cassian is born.
361	Julian the Apostate becomes the emperor of Rome. Ligugé Abbey founded by Martin of Tours
362	4th exile of Athanasius the Great by Julian the Apostate.
363	Death of Mar Awgin (a Syrian disciple of Pachomius the Great). He had established Christian monasticism in Mesopotamia.
364	5th and final exile of Athanasius the Great.
367	Epiphanius becomes the bishop of Cyprus.
368	Death of Theodorus of Tabennese.
370	Basil the Great, Archbishop of Caesarea, writes his Rules which becomes an important monastic text.
371	Death of Hilarion the Great.
373	Death of Athanasius the Great.; Death of Ephrem the Syrian.
373-5	Rufinus meets Melania in Egypt.
375	Death of Pambo.
c. 376	Jerome writes his Life of Paul of Thebes.
377	Euthymius the Great is born.
379	Death of Basil the Great.
380	At Gaza, Silvanus and a certain Mark the Calligrapher make a settlement.
381	First Ecumenical Council of Constantinople.
382	Jerome returns to Rome.
383	Evagrius of Nitria becomes a monk at Kellia.
385	Jerome moves to the Holy Land and starts a monastic settlement in Bethlehem.; Jerome visits Nitria.
c. 386	Death of Cronius of Nitria.
c. 390	Jerome writes his Life of Malchus.
390	Death of Isidore of Scetes.; Death of Or at age 90.; Palladius of Galatia lives at Nitria.
391	Death of Macarius of the Great.; Destruction of Pagan temples.; Jerome writes his Life of Hilarion.
394-5	Death of John of Lycopolis.
395	Death of Macarius the Younger.; Isaac of the Cells succeeds Cronius of Nitria.; John Cassian visits Paphnutius the Ascetic.
397	Death of Martin of Tours Bishop of Tours, France who helped establish it as a site of monastic learning in Gaul.
398	John Chrysostom is ordained the Archbishop of Constantinople.
399	Death of Evagrius of Nitria.; Archbishop Theophilus of Alexandria opposes Anthropomorphism and condemns Origenism.
c. 400	Arsenius the Great joins the monks at Scetis.; Death of Peter the Pionite.
c. 404	John Cassian establishes the first Egyptian-style monastery in Gaul.
405	Death of Moses the Black and his companions.; Death of John the Dwarf on Mount Colzim in Egypt.
407	Death of John Chrysostom.; Lucius and Longinus flee fame to Enaton.
407-408	1st destruction of Scetis by the Mazices. This marks the shifting of the center of Christian monasticism from Egypt to Palestine.; Poemen and his brothers leave Scetis and move to Terenuthis.
410	Rome is sacked by Alaric and the Visigoths.
c. 410	Foundation of the influential monastery of Lérins (present-day southern France).
411	Rufinus' version of the History of the Monks of Egypt is complete.; Death of Rufinus.
417	Death of Pishoy on July 15.
c. 419-20	Palladius writes his Lausaic History.
421-6	John Cassian writes the Institutes and the Conferences.
429	Death of Sisoes the Great.
431	Ecumenical Council of Ephesus.
434	2nd destruction of Scetis.; Arsenius the Great goes to Troe.
c. 435	Death of Agathon, disciple of Poemen.; Death of John Cassian in Marseilles.
439	Sabbas the Sanctified is born.
444	3rd destruction of Scetis.
445	Death of Arsenius the Great.
449	Death of Daniel of Egypt, disciple of Arsenius the Great.
450	Death of Poemen.; Death of Isidore of Pelusium.
451	Council of Chalcedon. After the Council of Chalcedon, the decision was made to put all Egyptian monasticism under church hierarchical supervision. This marked the end of the classical era of early Egyptian Christian monasticism.
455	Rome under, Emperor Romulus Augustus, is sacked by the Vandals.
459	Death of Simeon the Stylite.; Daniel becomes a Stylite.
c. 480	Birth of Benedict of Nursia who greatly shaped western monasticism ("Benedictine" monks).
484	The Great Lavra (Mar Saba) is founded by Sabbas the Sanctified.
491	Death of Isaiah the Solitary.; Paul the Great is canonized by Pope Gelasius I.
c. 500	Birth of Saint David of Wales to the Nun St. Non. He is a significant figure in Welsh Monasticism.
ca. 520	Foundation of the monastery of Seridus by abbot Seridus of Gaza.
527	Saint Catherine's Monastery is founded on Mount Sinai by Emperor Justinian the Great.
529	St Benedict of Nursia founds his famous monastery of Monte Cassino
c. 543	Death of Barsanuphius and John the Prophet, two hermits who wrote over 800 letters of spiritual guidance to monks, priests and lay people. Their disciple Dorotheus of Gaza goes on to found a new monastery.
521	Saint Columba major figure in monasticism in the British Isles is born.
563	Iona Abbey founded by Saint Columba.
570	4th destruction of Scetis.
