= Nitria =

Nitria could refer to:

- Nitra, a city in western Slovakia
- Nitria (monastic site), abandoned site of early Christian monastic activity
- Nitrian Desert, region in northwestern Egypt
