= Theodore of Pherme =

4th-century Egyptian Christian monk

- Born: Egypt
- Residence: Scetes
- Died: Egypt

Theodore of Pherme was an Egyptian Christian monk who lived in the desert of Scetes in Lower Egypt during the 4th century. He was one of the Desert Fathers.

Theodore was a monk at Scetis and may have been trained by Macarius the Great and Pambo. Once he was deaconized but refused the position out of humility, and wanted to live in solitude instead. Theodore later moved to Pherme after Scetis was sacked by barbarians in 408 A.D.
