= Isaac of the Cells =

Egyptian Christian monk

- Born: c. 4rd century AD; Egypt
- Residence: Nitria
- Died: after 407 AD; Egypt
- Venerated in: Coptic Orthodox Church
- Feast: 27 May (Pashons 19)

Isaac of the Cells (born c. 4th century AD - died after 407 AD) was an Egyptian Christian monk who lived during the 4th and 5th centuries in Nitria, Lower Egypt. He was one of the Desert Fathers.

He was a disciple of Cronius of Nitria and succeeded him in 395. However, later Archbishop Theophilus excommunicated him as an Origenist along with the Four Tall Brothers.

== See also ==
- First Origenist Crisis
