= Pambo =

Egyptian Desert Father

Saint Pambo of Nitria
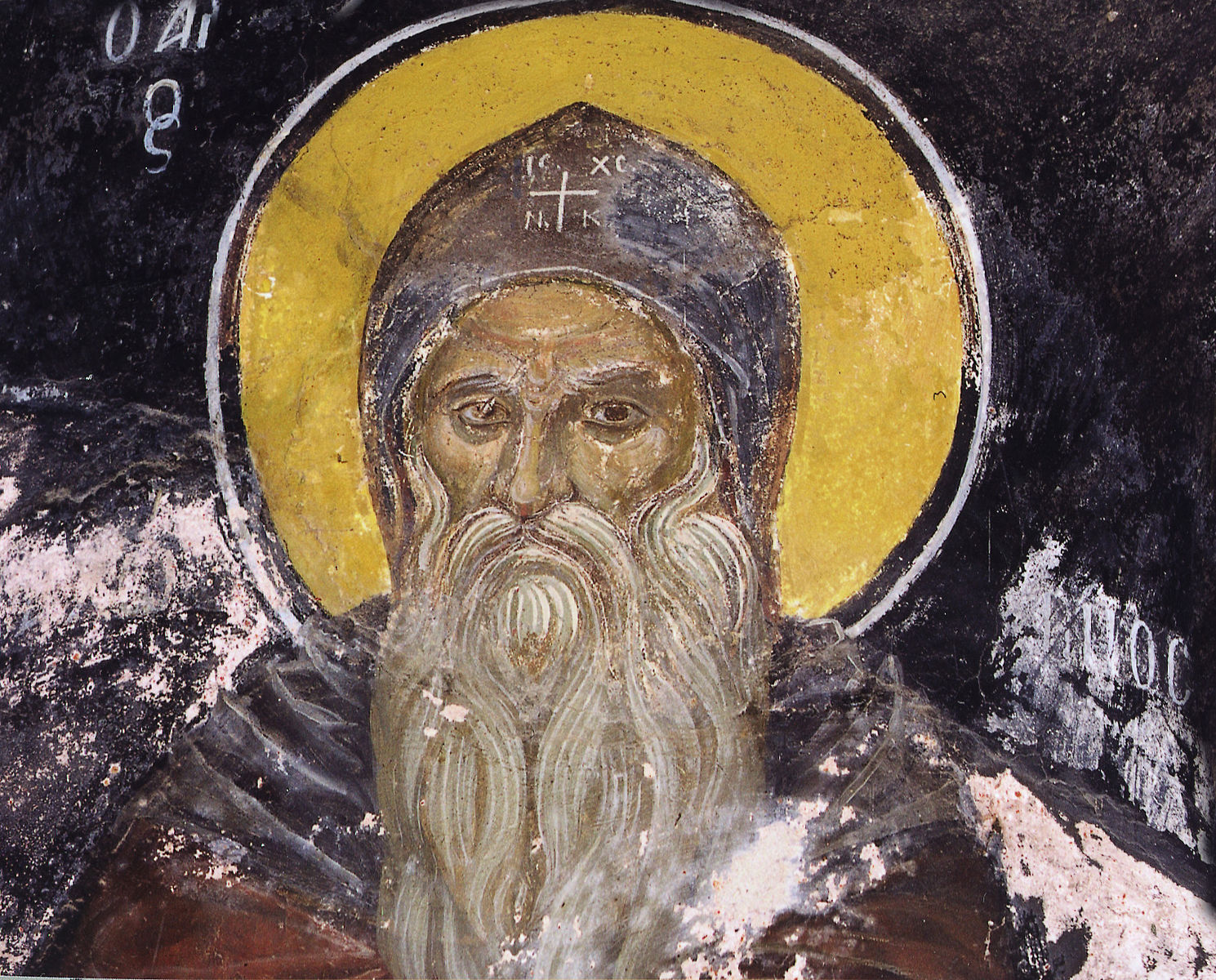

Desert Father Founder of Nitria
- Born: c. 305–315; Roman Egypt
- Died: c. 375–390 (aged 70–75 years); Nitria, Roman Egypt
- Venerated in: Oriental Orthodox Church; Eastern Orthodox Church; Roman Catholic Church
- Feast: July 18

Pambo of Nitria (Ancient Greek: Παμβώ, Pambó; Latin: Pambus; died c. 390) was a Coptic Desert Father of the fourth century and disciple of Anthony the Great. His feast day is July 18 among the Oriental Orthodox, Eastern Orthodox, and Catholic churches.

Pambo was a disciple of Anthony the Great. He lived in the Nitrian Desert where he founded many monasteries. He was renowned for his wisdom, and was consulted by many, including Athanasius, Melania the Elder, and Ammonas of Egypt. He was the spiritual father of several other canonized saints, including Pishoy and John the Dwarf.

== Biography ==
Much of the biographical information about Pambo is related through Palladius' Lausiac History and briefer mentions by Jerome and Tyrannius Rufinus.

=== Early monastic life ===
Little is known of Pambo's life prior to his becoming a monk and disciple of Anthony.

His most striking penance was silence. This began early in his monastic life after receiving the opening of Psalm 39 from his spiritual father: "I said, I will watch my ways so as to be unable to sin with my tongue.'" He did not say a word to his master for six months but worked to internalize this passage, and he humbly told other monks that he had scarcely internalized it even eighteen years later.

=== Spiritual father and abbot ===
He is known for having founded monasteries in the Nitrian Desert.

Pambo and his monastery received many gifts of support from Melania the Elder and had a close relationship with her. Pambo was either banished or simply went on pilgrimage to Palestine with Isidore, Pisimius, Adelphius, Paphnutius and a dozen other clergy, and Melania came with them. It is also related that he did not accept all of the gifts graciously, instead seeing an opportunity to invert her "haughty attitude about money." A particular account relates Melania gifting Pambo several hundred pounds of silver, which he promptly distributed to poor monasteries without acknowledging her.

During the early Christian debates over Arianism, Athanasius brought Pambo from Nitria to support him in the Alexandrian courts. Later, Athanasius wrote highly of Pambo as "well pleasing to God."

It is related that his face "shone like lightning," a mark of his high degree of holiness.

After two brothers received a large inheritance from their father, one gave it all away directly while another built a monastery and cared for those in need. When asked which was holier, Pambo stated that they were equals and reportedly had a vision of the brothers standing before God. This teaching has shed light on how early Christian monastics understood their own communities and purposes.

He personally knew Bessarion, Isaiah, Paësios, Arsisius, Serapion the Great—fellow monks of the Egyptian deserts—and is quoted speaking with several of them in collections of sayings.

The historian and theologian Rufinus visited Pambo in 374.

=== Death ===
==== Narrative ====
He was weaving a basket as he died, making this the first of his relics. Melania the Elder, who collected relics from many holy men, was at Nitria when he died and received that very basket. At the hour of his death, he reportedly said, "From the time that I came into this place of solitude and built my cell and dwelt in it I do not call to mind that I have eaten save what my hands have toiled for, nor repented of any word that I spoke... And so I go to the Lord as one that has not yet made a beginning of serving God."

==== Date of death ====
There is some ambiguity about when Pambo died. Some refer to the "historical Pambo" dying between 373–374. The Lausiac History itself relates only that he died prior to Palladius entering the desert, which would mean before 385. A Catholic daily martyrology maintains his death to have been "about 390," and others hold to the year 393.

Alban Butler's Lives of Saints offers the year of death as "c. A.D. 390."

== Veneration ==
Pambo is venerated among the Oriental Orthodox, Eastern Orthodox, and Catholic churches. His feast day is July 18.

== Legacy ==
=== Alleged Origenism ===
Pambo and other Nitrian monks have been branded by scholars as "Origenists." However, Graham Gould argues that there is little historical basis for believing that Pambo was either a highly educated figure or that he was contemporaneously associated with Origenism. This accusation arose due to controversy around some of his pupils and fellow monks, the Tall Brothers of Kellia.

=== Attributed liturgical views ===
He reportedly opposed women's involvement in liturgical singing and is said to have told a younger monk that troparia and echoi have a corrupting influence. Johannes Quasten himself used this story to demonstrate that early monastics opposed complex liturgical music. More recent scholarship, however, generally accepts that this account does not predate the 6th century. It is also worth noting that the particular collection in which the story is found—Gerbert's Scriptores ecclesiastici—is from the 18th century. So, the reliability of these narratives representing the historical Pambo's views is rather weak. James McKinnon says bluntly, "The story...of how Abba Pambo reproaches a young monk for being impressed with the 'canons' and 'troparia' of the Alexandrian churches, is apocryphal...and has the appearance of being from the sixth century."

=== Later references ===
A fictional version of Pambo appears in the 6th-century work, Legend of Hilaria, variously transliterated as "Bamu" or "Bamfu."

The 19th century writer, Robert Browning wrote a poem titled "Pambo" based on the saint's first lesson from Psalm 39.
