= Antipater of Bostra =

5th-century Greek prelate

Saint Antipater of Bostra

Bishop of Bostra
- Born: early 5th century AD
- Died: late 5th century AD
- Venerated in: Catholic Church; Eastern Orthodox Church
- Feast: 13 June

Antipater of Bostra (Ancient Greek: Ἀντίπατρος) was a Greek prelate who served as metropolitan bishop of Bostra in the Roman province of Arabia and was one of the foremost critics of Origen. He lived in the 5th century AD.

== Biography ==
Little detail is known of Antipater's life. He was born early in the 5th century and was Metropolitan of Bostra by 457, succeeding Constantine who attended the Councils of Ephesus II (449) and Chalcedon (451). Antipater maintained links with Palestinian Monasticism, particularly through Euthymius the Great and his followers. He was a pronounced opponent of Origen, held in high esteem by his contemporaries both civil and ecclesiastical, and was rated among the authoritative ecclesiastical writers by the Fathers of the Seventh General Council (787). There have reached us, in the acts of this council, only a few fragments of his lengthy refutation of the "Apology for Origen" put together (c. 309) by Pamphilus and Eusebius of Caesarea. The work of Antipater was looked on as a masterly composition, and, as late as 540 was ordered to be read in the churches of the East as an antidote to the spread of the Origenistic heresies (Cotelier, Monument. Eccl. Graec., III, 362). He also wrote a treatise against the Apollinarists, known only in brief fragments, and several homilies, two of which have reached us in their entirety. Antipater's date of death is unknown. His memory is kept on 13 June.

== Theology ==
=== Anti-Origenism ===
The most significant contribution Antipater made was his staunch opposition to Origenism. In his Life of Sabbas the Sanctified, Cyril of Scythopolis says that Antipater was for a time the chief doctrinal authority cited in the Origenist crisis of the 6th century. In his Refutation of the Apology for Origen (a text written by Pamphilus of Caesarea), he denounced the doctrines of the pre-existence of souls and apocatastasis with dogmatic precision. Likewise he opposes Origen's allegorical reading of the creation of man in Genesis.

=== Mariology ===
Antipater is the attributed author of a number of Marian homilies which bear witness to the theological settlement of the Council of Ephesus. Two, On John the Baptist and On the Annunciation are edited within Patrologia Graeca. Within those considered genuine, the Eve-Mary parallel used by Christian theologians since the second century is well-attested and he refers to Mary as Theotokos. He speaks highly of Mary's role in the economy of salvation, going so far as to use an early form of a word by which later theologians would dub her Mediatrix. In the 19th century an ancient Greek inscription was found, commemorating the construction of a large church dedicated to Mary in Bostra. Waddington constructs the mostly lost name of the founder as [Ἀντίπατρ]ος, Antipater. Sartre concurs with this rendering, and argues on the basis of the ascribed Marian sermons that Antipater had a special devotion to Mary which drove him to dedicate a church to her. The inscription lauds Mary as "much-sung" and "the undefiled dispenser of marvellous gifts."

== Writings ==
A number of homilies attributed to Antipater have been handed down, in translation or fragmentary form. These include four On Christ's Nativity in Armenian translation, two on St John the Baptist, the Silence of Zechariah, and the greeting of the Mother of God, and The Annunciation and Visitation, two On Epiphany and On the Beginning of the Fast, and a Latin homily On the Assumption of Mary O'Carroll considers many of them to be of dubious authenticity.
