= Theodorus of Egypt =

Coptic monk of the 4th century

- Born: N/A
- Died: ~340 AD; Egypt
- Honored in: Catholic Church, Coptic Church, Eastern Orthodox Church
- Feast: 7 January

Theodorus of Egypt (died ~340) was a Coptic Christian monk and hermit who lived in the time of emperor Constantine the Great. Very little is known of his life. He was a disciple of Saint Amun and one of the first desert fathers in the Nile area. Athanasius of Alexandria and Saint Gregory the Great mention him in their writings.

His feast day in the Catholic Church is on 7 January.
