= Patriarch Theophilus I =

Patriarch Theophilus I may refer to:

- Theophilus I of Alexandria, ruled in 385–412
- Patriarch Theophilus I of Jerusalem, ruled in 1012–1020
