= John Cassian =

Christian monk and theologian (c.360–435)

Saint John Cassian
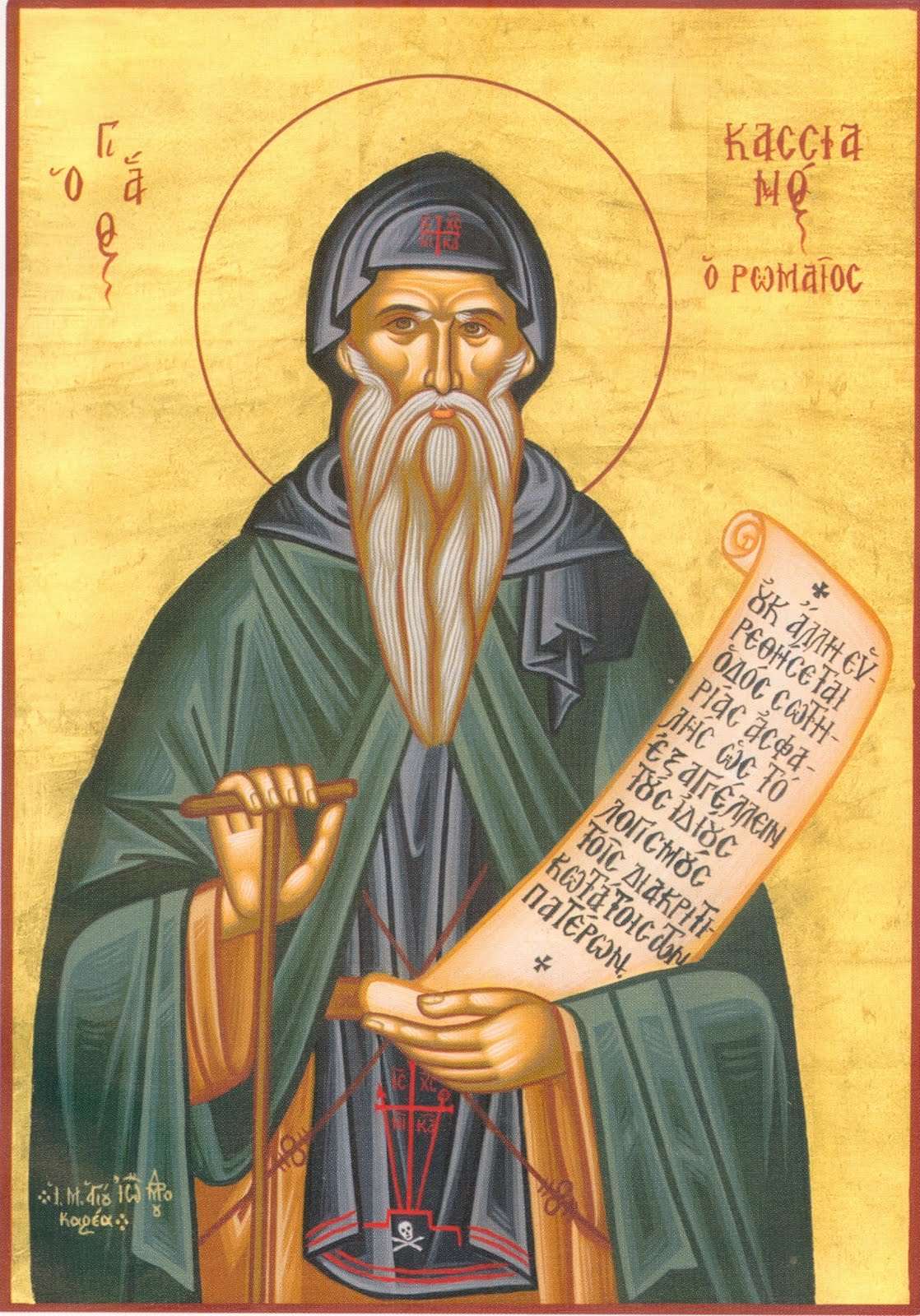

Church Father Theologian, Monk
- Born: c. 360; Scythia Minor, Roman Empire
- Died: c. 435; Massilia, Gallia Narbonensis, Western Roman Empire
- Venerated in: Catholic Church; Eastern Orthodox Church; Oriental Orthodox Church; Anglican Communion
- Major shrine: Monastery of St Victor, Marseille
- Feast: East: February 29th (28th non-leap years); West: July 23

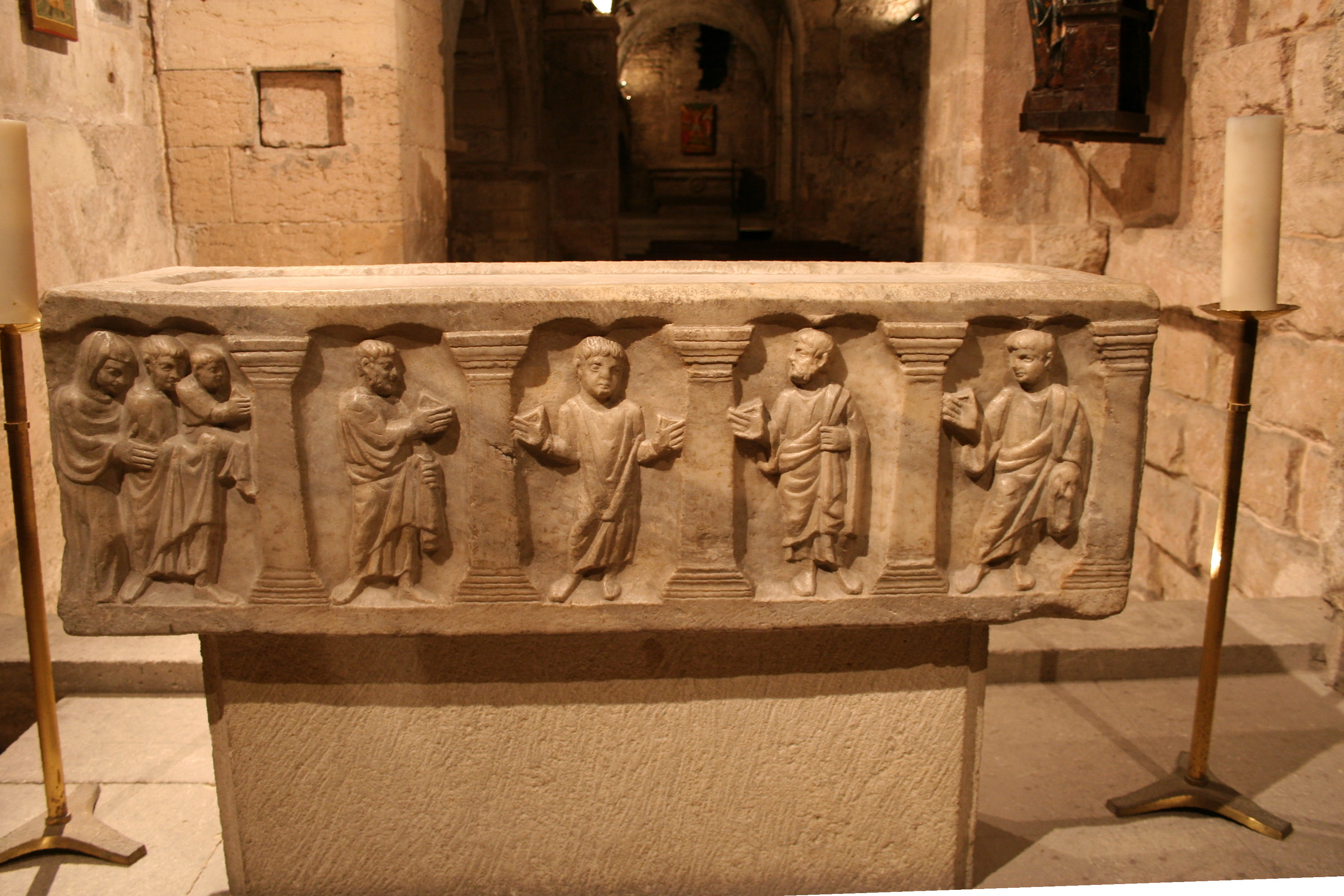
Sarcophagus of John Cassian, from the Abbey of Saint Victor, Marseille

John Cassian (c. AD 360 – c. 435), also known as John the Ascetic and John Cassian the Roman, (Note: Latin: Ioannes Eremita Cassianus, Ioannes Cassianus, or Ioannes Massiliensis; Greek: Ἰωάννης Κάσσιος ὁ Ἐρημίτης) was a Christian monk and theologian celebrated in both the Western and Eastern churches for his mystical writings. Cassian is noted for his role in bringing the ideas and practices of early Christian monasticism to the medieval West.

== Biography ==
Cassian was born around 360, most likely in the region of Scythia Minor (now Dobruja, a historical region in present-day Romania and Bulgaria), although some scholars assume a Gallic origin. The son of wealthy parents, he received a good education: his writings show the influence of Cicero and Persius. He was bilingual in Latin and Greek.

In his first work, the Institutes, Cassian mentions having a sister, with whom he corresponded in his monastic life; she may have ended up with him in Marseille.

As a young adult he traveled to Palestine with an older friend, Germanus, with whom he would spend much of the next twenty-five years. The two entered a hermitage near Bethlehem. After remaining in that community for about three years, they journeyed to the desert of Scete in Egypt, which was rent by Christian struggles. There they visited a number of monastic foundations.

Approximately fifteen years later, about 399, Cassian and Germanus faced the Anthropomorphic controversy provoked in letter form by Theophilus, Archbishop of Alexandria. Cassian noted that the majority of the monks received the message of their patriarch "with bitterness", and charged Theophilus with heresy for impugning the plain teaching of scripture. Following an unsuccessful journey to Alexandria to protest the matter, Cassian and Germanus fled with about 300 other Origenist monks. Cassian and Germanus went to Constantinople, where they appealed to the Patriarch of Constantinople, John Chrysostom, for protection. Cassian was ordained a deacon and became a member of the clergy attached to the patriarch while the struggles with the imperial family ensued. When the patriarch was forced into exile from Constantinople in 404, Chrysostom sent the Latin-speaking Cassian to Rome to plead the patriarchal cause before Pope Innocent I.

While in Rome, Cassian accepted the invitation to found an Egyptian-style monastery in southern Gaul, near Marseille. He may also have spent time as a priest in Antioch between 404 and 415. In any case, he arrived in Marseille around 415. His foundation, the Abbey of St Victor, was a complex of monasteries for both men and women, one of the first such institutes in the West, and served as a model for later monastic development.

Cassian's achievements and writings influenced Benedict of Nursia (480-547), who incorporated many of Cassian's principles into his monastic rule, and recommended to his own monks that they read the works of Cassian. Since Benedictine, Cistercian, and Trappist monks still follow Benedict's rule, John Cassian's thought still exercises influence over the spiritual lives of thousands of men and women in the Latin Church.

Cassian died in 435 at Marseille.

== Writings ==
Cassian came very late into writing and did so only when a request was made by one or more important persons. His sources were the same as those of Evagrius Ponticus, but he added his own ideas, which were arranged in extensive collections. Evagrius was, however, the single most important influence on Cassian's ideas, due to his reverence for the "Origenist" monks (who also relied predominantly on Evagrius) of Nitria, Kellia, and Scetis, three early monastic centres in the desert of the northwestern Nile Delta.

Around 420, at the request of Bishop Castor of Apt in Gallia Narbonensis, Cassian wrote two major spiritual works, the De institutis coenobiorum (Institutes of the Coenobia) and the Conlationes or Collationes patrum in scythica eremo (Conferences of the Desert Fathers). In these, he codified and transmitted the wisdom of the Desert Fathers of Egypt. The Institutes deal with the external organization of monastic communities, while the Conferences deal with "the training of the inner man and the perfection of the heart".

His books were written in Latin, in a simple, direct style. They were swiftly translated into Greek, which indicates the Eastern monks recognized him as one of their own. Some of his works had been translated into Georgian by the 11th century.

=== The Institutes ===
The Institutes were meant to help Castor to establish a coenobium following the model of Egypt, in contrast to the existing monastic life in Gaul, which included the work of Martin of Tours. According to Hugh Feiss the Institutes are a counterweight to Sulpicius Severus' Life of Martin and Dialogues, and are an attempt to put order into a movement Cassian regarded as chaotic. Cassian, who insists on manual work, had a higher opinion of and close ties with the monastery on the Island of Lerins, founded by Honoratus.

In Books 1–4 of Institutions, Cassian discusses clothing, prayer and rules of monastic life. Books 5–12 are rules on morality, specifically addressing the eight vices – gluttony, lust, greed, wrath, sadness, listlessness, boasting and hubris – and what to do to cure these vices. In the Institutions, Cassian discusses a will that is more complex than the will at the heart of the Pelagian message. Willful monks are a contentious problem, and Cassian paid considerable attention to analyzing the will, treating the corrupt will, and chiefly subordinating even the good will for the good of the community and ultimately, the will of God.

Below is an outline of Cassian's Institutes:

| Book | Title in Latin | Topics |
|---|---|---|
| 1 | De habitu monachorum | The monastic habit and its allegorical meaning |
| 2 | De canonico nocturnarum orationum et psalmorum modo | Method of praying the psalms: night prayers |
| 3 | De canonico diurnarum orationum et psalmorum modo | Method of praying the psalms: day prayers |
| 4 | De institutis renuntiantium | Rules and instructions for new monks |
| 5 | De spiritu gastrimargiae | First Vice: Gluttony |
| 6 | De spiritu fornicationis | Second Vice: Fornication |
| 7 | De spiritu filargyriae | Third Vice: Love of money |
| 8 | De spiritu irae | Fourth Vice: Anger |
| 9 | De spiritu tristitiae | Fifth Vice: Sadness |
| 10 | De spiritu acediae | Sixth Vice: Listlessness (acēdia) |
| 11 | De spiritu cenodoxiae | Seventh Vice: Vainglory |
| 12 | De spiritu superbiae | Eighth Vice: Pride |

=== The Conferences ===
The Conferences, dedicated to Pope Leo, to the bishop of Fréjus, and to the monk Helladius, summarize important conversations that Cassian had with elders from the monastery at Scetis about principles of the spiritual and ascetic life. This book addresses specific problems of spiritual theology and the ascetic life. It was later read in Benedictine communities after the evening meal, and from the Latin title, Collationes, comes the word collation in the sense of "light meal".

Outline of Cassian's Conferences:

First Set
| Conference | Title in Latin | Topic | Speaker |
|---|---|---|---|
| 1 | De monachi destinatione vel fine | The goal and end of the monk | Moses (of Scetis) |
| 2 | De discretione | Discernment | Moses |
| 3 | De tribus abrenunitationibus | The three renunciations | Paphnutius (of Scetis) |
| 4 | De concupiscentia carnis ac spiritus | Desires of the flesh | Daniel (of Scetis) |
| 5 | De octo vitiis principalibus | The eight principle vices | Sarapion (of Scetis) |
| 6 | De nece sanctorum | The murder of saintly people | Theodore (of Kellia) |
| 7 | De animae mobilitate et spiritalibus nequitiis | Evil spirits and the soul's changeability | Serenus (of Scetis) |
| 8 | De principatibus | The principalities | Serenus |
| 9 | De oratione | Prayer (disposition, types) | Isaac (of Scetis) |
| 10 | De oratione | Prayer (unceasing, method) | Isaac |

Second Set
| Conference | Title in Latin | Topics | Speaker |
|---|---|---|---|
| 11 | De perfectione | Perfection | Chaeremon (an anchorite near Panephysis) |
| 12 | De castitate | Chastity | Chaeremon |
| 13 | De protectione Dei | Grace and free will | Chaeremon |
| 14 | De spiritali scientia | Spiritual knowledge, biblical interpretation | Nestoros (an anchorite near Panephysis) |
| 15 | De charismatibus diuinis | Charisms | Nesteros |
| 16 | De amicitia | Friendship | Joseph (an anchorite near Panephysis) |
| 17 | De definiendo | Oaths and promises | Joseph |

Third Set
| Conference | Title in Latin | Topics | Speaker |
|---|---|---|---|
| 18 | De tribus generibus monachorum | Three types of monks | Piamun (of Diolcos, a cenobite turned anchorite) |
| 19 | De fine coenobiotae et heremitae | Cenobites and anchorites | John (of Diolcos, an anchorite turned cenobite) |
| 20 | De paenitentiae fine et satisfactionis indicio | Penitence and reparation | Pinufius (of Panephysis, cenobite) |
| 21 | De remissione quinquagensimae | Relaxing during Pentecost | Pinufius |
| 22 | De nocturnis inlusionibus | Dreams and nocturnal emissions | Pinufius |
| 23 | De anamarteto | Sinlessness | Theonas (of Scetis, an anchorite) |
| 24 | De mortificatione | Mortification, renunciation | Abraham (of Diolcos, an anchorite) |

== Spirituality ==
The desert ascetics of Egypt followed a three-step path to mysticism: Purgatio, Illuminatio, and Unitio. These stages correspond to the three ways of later Catholic theology. During the first level, Purgatio (in Greek, Catharsis), young monks struggled through prayer and ascetic practices to gain control of "the flesh"—specifically by purging their gluttony, lust and desire for possessions. This period of purgation, which often took many years, was intended to teach young monks that whatever strength they had to resist these desires (grace) came directly from the Holy Spirit.

At this point, the Illuminatio (theoria in Greek) commenced. During this period the monks practiced the paths to holiness as revealed in the Gospel, identifying strongly with the Christ who taught the Sermon on the Mount (found in Matthew 5–7). Many monks took in visitors and students and tended the poor as much as their resources allowed. Many monks died never having moved past this period. The final stage was the Unitio (theosis in Greek), a period in which the soul of the monk was meant to bond with the Spirit of God in a union often described as the marriage of the Song of Solomon (also called the "Song of Songs" or the "Canticle of Canticles"). To find the solitude and peace that this level of mystical awareness demanded, elderly monks often fled into the deep desert or into remote forests.

His asceticism, while rigorous, was tempered by common sense. Cassian says hospitality should override ascetical routine. Even the most contemplative of anchorites should entertain visitors. Both asceticism and ministry are aspects of the practical life.

In his Conferences, Cassian recommended as "absolutely necessary for possessing the perpetual awareness of God" the formula in Psalm 70 (69) v. 2, Deus, in adiutorium meum intende. Domine, ad adiuvandum me festina ("God, incline unto my aid; O Lord, make haste to help me"). He says of it:

Not without reason has this verse been selected out of the whole body of Scripture. For it takes up all the emotions that can be applied to human nature and with great correctness and accuracy it adjusts itself to every condition and every attack. It contains an invocation of God in the face of any crisis, the humility of a devout confession, the watchfulness of concern and of constant fear, a consciousness of one's own frailty, the assurance being heard, and confidence in a protection that is always present and at hand, for whoever calls unceasingly on his protector is sure that he is always present. It contains a burning love and charity, an awareness of traps, and a fear of enemies. Seeing oneself surrounded by these day and night, one confesses that one cannot be set free without the help of one's defender. This verse is an unassailable wall, an impenetrable breastplate, and a very strong shield for those who labour under the attack of demons.

— Cassian 1997, p. 381, Tenth Conference, X, 2-4

Benedict of Nursia praises Cassian's Conferences in his rule and use of this formula became part of the Liturgy of the Hours in the Western Church, in which all the canonical hours, including the minor hours, start with this versicle, which is omitted only if the hour begins with the Invitatory, the introduction to the first hour said in the day, whether it be the Office of Readings or Morning Prayer. Alphonsus Liguori also cites Cassian's recommendation to use this short prayer continually.

In the West, Cassian's proposition that "the slightest glimmer of goodwill" could be attributed to the human drive was widely regarded as unacceptable in relation to the prosperity of the Augustinianism of the period (Conf. 13.7.1; cf Prosper of Aquitaine Contra Collatorem; Cassiodorus, Institutiones 1.29; Decretum Gelasianum V.7). In his Thirteenth Conference and in writings to the Monks of Lerins, Cassian qualifies this by saying the good will is "stirred" by God:

For when God sees us inclined to will what is good, He meets, guides, and strengthens us: for "At the voice of thy cry, as soon as He shall hear, He will answer thee;" and: "Call upon Me," He says, "in the day of tribulation and I will deliver thee, and thou shalt glorify Me." And again, if He finds that we are unwilling or have grown cold, He stirs our hearts with salutary exhortations, by which a good will is either renewed or formed in us.

— Schaff 2009, p. 428

Cassian finds the will to be insufficient for spiritual progress, and traces this back to the initial sin of pride. Cassian illustrates advanced cases of the will's pathology in the Institutions, saying these problems began when man "believed himself capable of attaining the glory of the Godhead by his freedom of will and hard work." To this end, Cassian believes the renunciate must conquer his will, overcome it, and even kill it.

In regards to demons, Cassian noted that the earliest coenobites would ensure one monk was reciting a prayer, psalmody, or reading at all times, due to their belief that demons were especially prevalent at night. Cassian promotes David's evil spirit repulsing prayer at Ps. 35: 1–3, for demons actively oppose the virtuous life, and could be warded off with prayer.

== Accusations of Semipelagianism ==
=== As viewed by the Catholic Church ===
His third book, On the Incarnation of the Lord, was a defense of orthodox doctrine against the views of Nestorius, and was written at the request of the Archdeacon of Rome, later Pope Leo I. In this book Cassian points out a link between Nestorianism which stresses the humanity of Jesus and Pelagianism which stresses human effort. Later theologians, however, labeled Cassian as "Semipelagian" because he stressed the role of the human will, as opposed to Augustine's stress on the totality of grace, in moving towards salvation.

The ideas expressed by Cassian to which critics have pointed as examples of his alleged Semipelagianism are found in his Conferences, in book 3, the Conference of Abbot Paphnutius; book 5, the Conference of Abbot Serapion; and most especially in book 13, the Third Conference of Abbot Chaeremon.

The view that Cassian propounded Semipelagianism has been disputed. Lauren Pristas, writes: "For Cassian, salvation is, from beginning to end, the effect of God's grace. It is fully divine. Salvation, however, is salvation of a rational creature who has sinned through free choice. Therefore, salvation necessarily includes both free human consent in grace and the gradual rehabilitation in grace of the faculty of free choice. Thus Cassian insists salvation is also fully human. His thought, however, is not Semi-Pelagian, nor do readers who submit to the whole corpus emerge Semi-Pelagians." And Augustine Casiday states that "for Cassian ... although sparks of goodwill may exist (which are not directly caused by God), they are totally inadequate and only direct divine intervention can ensure our spiritual progress".

The Latin Church condemned Semipelagianism in the local Council of Orange (529), but recognizes Cassian himself as a saint. It did not endorse Augustine entirely and, while later Catholic theologians accepted Augustine's authority, they interpreted his views in the light of writers such as Cassian.

=== As viewed by the Eastern Orthodox Church ===
Augustine Casiday states that Cassian "boldly asserts that God's grace, not human free will, is responsible for 'everything which pertains to salvation' - even faith." Some other Orthodox, who do not apply the term "Semi-Pelagian" to their theology, criticize the Roman Catholics for allegedly rejecting Cassian, whom they accept as fully orthodox, and for holding, as, in Casiday's interpretation, that everything which pertains to salvation comes from God's grace, and so that even the human consent to God's justifying action is itself an effect of grace. (Note: "When Catholics say that persons cooperate in preparing for an accepting justification by consenting to God's justifying action, they see such personal consent as itself an effect of grace, not as an action arising from innate human abilities" (Karras, Valerie A. "Beyond Justification: An Orthodox Perspective". Archived from the original on 2010-11-30.)) This position of the Roman Catholic Church and of Cassian as interpreted by Casiday is attributed by Eastern Orthodox theologian Georges Florovsky also to the Eastern Orthodox Church, which, he says, "always understood that God initiates, accompanies, and completes everything in the process of salvation", rejecting instead the Calvinist idea of irresistible grace. (Note: The existential and ontological meaning of man's created existence is precisely that God did not have to create, that it was a free act of Divine freedom. But— and here is the great difficulty created by an unbalanced Christianity on the doctrine of grace and freedom— in freely creating man God willed to give man an inner spiritual freedom. In no sense is this a Pelagian or Semi-Pelagian position. The balanced synergistic doctrine of the early and Eastern Church, a doctrine misunderstood and undermined by Latin Christianity in general from Saint Augustine on— although there was always opposition to this in the Latin Church— always understood that God initiates, accompanies, and completes everything in the process of salvation. What it always rejected— both spontaneously and intellectually— is the idea of irresistible grace, the idea that man has no participating role in his salvation. (Florovsky, Georges, The Ascetic Ideal and the New Testament: Reflections on the Critique of the Theology of the Reformation (PDF))) Neither Cassian nor any of his teachings have ever been directly or indirectly called into question or condemned by Eastern Orthodox, as they are considered a witness to the Orthodox position. (Note: Augustine's writings found their way to parts of the West Roman provinces. Saint John Cassian (circa 360-433), former ascetic in the deserts of Egypt and then deacon of the Patriarch of Constantinople Saint John Chrysostom, challenged Augustine's teaching about original sin and pre-destination without mentioning him. The teachings of Augustine on these points were condemned by the Council of Orange in 529.[ 18 ] Augustine's writings completely captured the 8th century Carolingian tradition which knew basically only Augustine until the 12th century. At that time the Franks acquired a translation of Saint John of Damascus' "Book on the Orthodox Faith" which they simply understood within their own Augustinian categories. By the 11th century the Franks had taken over all of Western Europe, except Spain, by either conquest or diplomacy. The Spanish Romans under Arab rule were still under the direct surveillance of the Roman Emperor of Constantinople New Rome. The Umayyad Arabs of Spain and the Abbasid Arabs of Damascus and then Baghdad called their Roman Orthodox subjects Melkites, i.e. those who belong to the religion of the Roman Emperor in New Rome Constantinople. (Romanides, John S. "The Cure of the Neurobiological Sickness of Religion".))

=== In Cassian's writings ===
In The Book of Mystical Chapters, a compilation of sayings of the Church Fathers by renowned theologian and early church historian John Anthony McGuckin, Cassian is quoted as saying the following:

The thief on the cross certainly did not receive
the Kingdom of Heaven as a reward for his virtues
but as a grace and a mercy from God.
He can serve as an authentic witness
that our salvation is given to us
only by God's mercy and grace.
All the holy masters knew this
and unanimously taught that perfection in holiness
can be achieved only through humility.

— McGuckin 2003, p. 24

=== Other views ===
According to some scholars, Cassian is a prominent representative of a monastic movement in southern Gaul which, ca. 425, gave expression to the soteriological view that much later was called Semipelagianism. This emphasized the role of free will in that the first steps of salvation are in the power of the individual, without the need for divine grace. His thought has been described as a "middle way" between Pelagianism, which taught that the will alone was sufficient to live a sinless life, and the view of Augustine of Hippo, which emphasizes original sin and the absolute need for grace. For instance, Anglican priest and historian Owen Chadwick stated that Cassian held that man can come to God without the intervention of divine grace first; and the Presbyterian theologian B. B. Warfield called Cassian the leader of the monastics in southern Gaul who asserted that men begin their turning to God and that God assists that beginning.

== Influence ==
The spiritual traditions of Cassian had an immeasurable effect on Western Europe. Many different western spiritualities, from that of St Benedict of Nursia to that of St Ignatius of Loyola, owe their basic ideas to Cassian.

Pope Gregory I's teaching on the seven deadly sins comes from Cassian, as does much of his teaching on compunction and prayer. Philip Neri used to read Cassian to the laity and would frequently use his work as the starting point for his own addresses. He also influenced John Climacus and John of Damascus, as well as Saint Dominic, Francis de Sales, and John Henry Newman.

Cassian's writings stress the role of prayer and personal asceticism in attaining salvation by contrast with Augustine's writings which stress the role of God's justice and grace (predestination) and take a more negative view of human effort. His teaching on overcoming the eight evil tendencies (See Books 5 to 12 of The Institutes) were the inspiration behind the way the Irish monks practised asceticism, as shown in the Irish Penitentials.

The Institutes had a direct influence on organization of monasteries described in the Rule of Saint Benedict; Benedict also recommended that ordered selections of the Conferences be read to monks under his Rule. Moreover, the monastic institutions Cassian inspired kept learning and culture alive during the Early Middle Ages, and were often the only institutions that cared for the sick and poor.

His works are excerpted in the Philokalia (Greek for "love of the beautiful"), the Eastern Orthodox compendium on mystical Christian prayer.

Even modern thinkers have been influenced by Cassian's thinking. Michel Foucault was fascinated by the rigorous way Cassian defined and struggled against the "flesh". Pope Leo XIV includes his portrayal of a monk's "humility of heart" in his account of monasticism's historic care for the poor.

Cassian's thought and writings are enjoying a recent popularity even in non-religious circles.

== Veneration ==
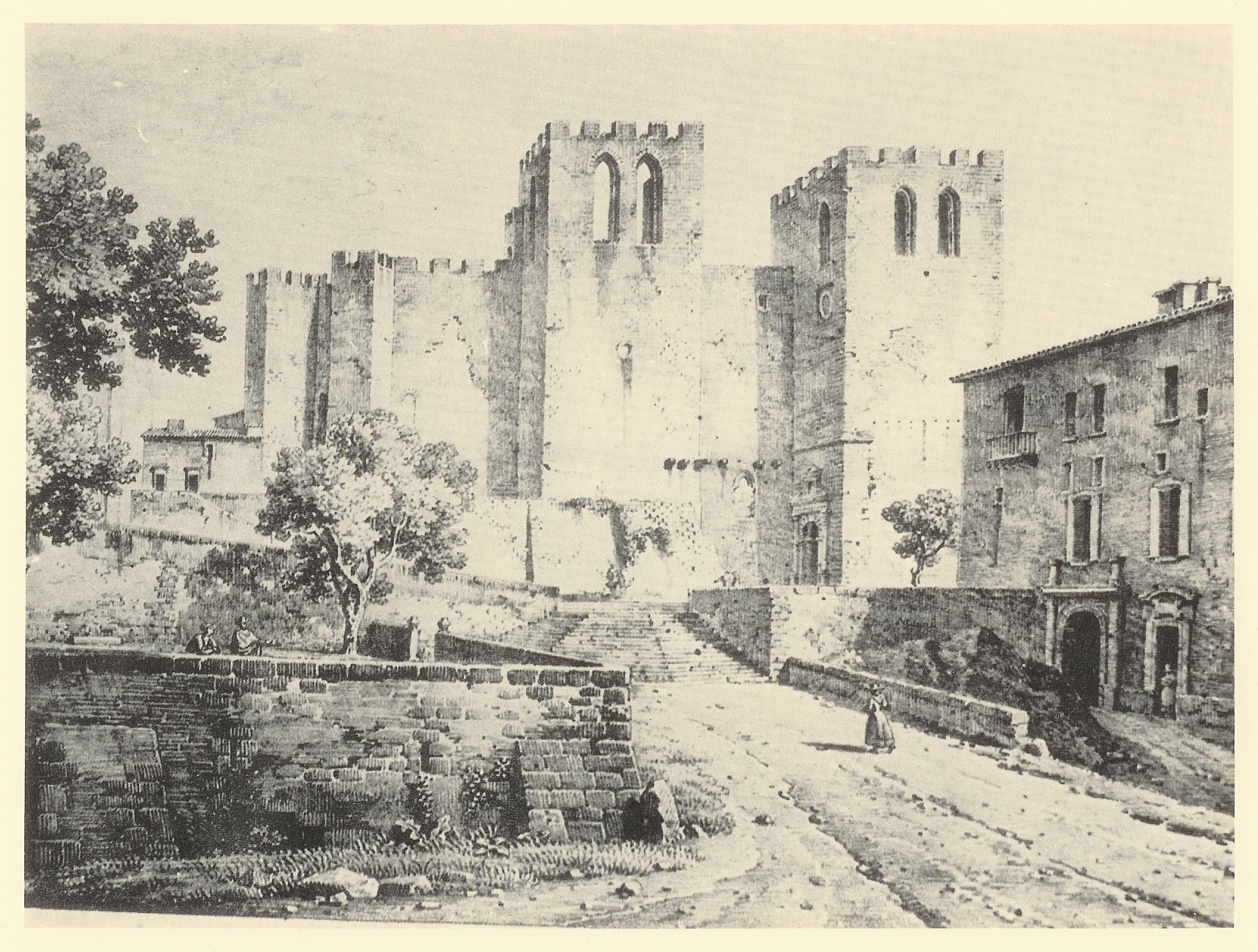
Abbey of Saint Victor, Marseille, where his relics are placed

He is a saint of the Eastern Orthodox Churches, with a feast day on 29 February. Because this day occurs only once every four years on leap years, official church calendars often transfer his feast to another date (usually 28 February).

He is also a saint of the Oriental Orthodox Churches, his Christology considered Miaphysite by the Church and his works being relevant in the theological discourse of the 4th and 5th centuries.

The Catholic Church also ranks him as a saint, with a feast day on 23 July (death anniversary). Like his contemporaries Augustine of Hippo and John Chrysostom, he was never formally canonized, a process that came into use several centuries after his death. Pope Urban V referred to him as sanctus (a saint) and he was included in the Gallican Martyrology He is included also in the Roman Martyrology with a feast-day on 23 July. In the Irish church, at the beginning of the ninth century, Cassian was commemorated on 25 November, as indicated in the Martyrology of Óengus: "Lasin nEoin Cassian assa érchain corann" (With John Cassian whose crown is very fair). Like the great majority of recognized saints of the church, he is not one of the saints in the General Roman Calendar, but the Archdiocese of Marseilles and some monastic orders celebrate his memorial on his feast day.

In 2022, John Cassian was officially added to the Episcopal Church liturgical calendar with a feast day on 23 July.

Cassian's relics are kept in an underground chapel in the Monastery of Saint Victor in Marseilles. His head and right hand are in the main church there.

== Works ==
English Translations

- Cassian, John (1985). Conferences. Translated by Colm Luibhéid. Paulist Press. ISBN 978-0-8091-2694-1.
- Cassian, John (1997). Boniface Ramsey (ed.). The Conferences. ACW 57. The Newman Press. ISBN 978-0-8091-0484-0.
- Cassian, John (2000). Boniface Ramsey (ed.). The Institutes. ACW 58. Newman Press. ISBN 978-0-8091-0522-9.
- Cassian, John (2019). The Institutes. Translated by Edgar C.S. Gibson, amended. SAGOM Press. ISBN 978-1-9456-9909-2.

French translations

- Cassian, John (1955–59). E. Pichery (ed.). Conférences. SC 42. Éditions du Cerf.
- Cassian, John (2024). Pascale-Dominique Nau, o.p. (ed.). Entretiens I-X avec les Pères de Scété: Introduction, traduction et notes. Parole et Silence. ISBN 978-2889595488.
- Cassian, John (1965). Jean-Claude Guy (ed.). Institutions cénobitiques. SC 109. Éditions du Cerf.

== See also ==
- Libertarianism (metaphysics)
