= Cellia =

Cellia may refer to:

- Cellia, subgenus of mosquitos
- Kellia, a 4th-century Egyptian Christian monastic community in the Nitrian Desert
