= Isidore of Scetes =

Egyptian priest and ascetic

Saint Isidore of Scetes
- Born: 4th century Egypt
- Residence: Scetes
- Died: c. 390; Egypt
- Feast: 15 January

Saint Isidore of Scetes (born c. 4th century - died c. 390) was a 4th-century A.D. Egyptian Christian priest and desert ascetic.

Isidore was one of the Desert Fathers and was a companion of Macarius the Great. John Cassian lists him as the leader of one of the four monastic communities of Scetes. The Roman Martyrology describes the blessed Isidore as renowned for holiness of life, faith and miracles. His feast day is 15 January.

== Monks of Ramsgate account ==
The Monks of Ramsgate wrote in their Book of Saints (1921),

ISIDORE (St.) (Jan. 15)
(4th cent) An Egyptian priest and ascetic, the spiritual father of more than a thousand monks, the friend and supporter of St. Athanasius and later of St. John Chrysostom. He played a notable part in the controversies of his time, and underwent much unjust persecution at the hands of Theophilus of Alexandria. Palladius enlarges on his virtues and on his eminent holiness of life. He died at an advanced age, shortly after A.D. 400.}

== Butler's account ==
The hagiographer Alban Butler wrote in his Lives of the Fathers, Martyrs, and Other Principal Saints,

ST. ISIDORE, P.H. He was priest of Scété, and hermit in that vast desert. He excelled in an unparalleled gift of meekness, continency, prayer, and recollection. Once perceiving in himself some motions of anger to rise, he that instant threw down certain baskets he was carrying to market, and ran away to avoid the occasion. When in his old age, others persuaded him to abate something in his labour, he answered; "If we consider what the Son of God hath done for us, we can never allow ourselves any indulgence in sloth. Were my body burnt, and my ashes scattered in the air, it would be nothing." Whenever the enemy tempted him to despair, he said: "Were I to be damned, thou wouldst yet be below me in hell; nor would I cease to labour in the service of God, though assured that this was to be my lot." If he was tempted to vain-glory, he reproached and confounded himself with the thought, how far even in his exterior exercises he fell short of the servants of God, Antony, Pambo, and others. Being asked the reason of his abundant tears, he answered: "I weep for my sins: if we had only once offended God, we could never sufficiently bewail this misfortune." He died a little before the year 391. His name stands in the Roman Martyrology, on the fifteenth of January. See Cassian. coll.18. c.15 and 16. Tillem. t.8.p.440.

== Sources ==
- Butler, Alban (1812), The Lives of the Fathers, Martyrs, and Other Principal Saints: Compiled from Original Monuments and Other Authentic Records, Illustrated with the Remarks of Judicious Modern Critics and Historians, J. Murphy This article incorporates text from this source, which is in the public domain.
- "Fifteenth Day of January", Roman Martyrology, imprimatur of Cardinal James Gibbons (revised ed.), 1914 – via CatholicSaints.info
- St. Augustine's Abbey, Ramsgate (1921). The Book of saints : a dictionary of servants of God canonized by the Catholic Church. London: A. & C. Black, ltd. OCLC 671676136. This article incorporates text from this source, which is in the public domain.
- Ward, Benedicta (1984), The sayings of the Desert Fathers: the alphabetical collectionI, Kalamazoo, M: Cistercian Publications, ISBN 0-87907-959-2
