= Bessarion of Egypt =

Egyptian monk and Desert Father

Saint Bessarion the Great
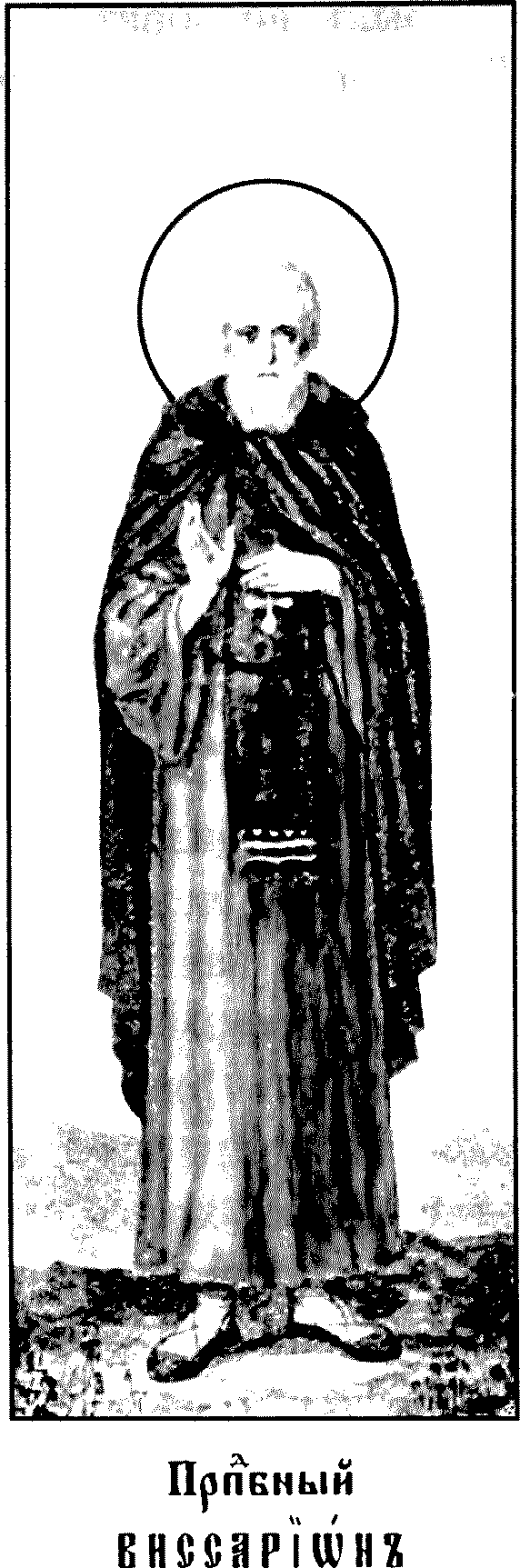

Desert Father and Venerable Wonderworker
- Born: 4th century AD; Roman Egypt
- Residence: Scetes or Nitria
- Died: 5th century AD; Roman Egypt
- Venerated in: Eastern Orthodox Church; Roman Catholic Church; Oriental Orthodox Church
- Feast: 6 June; 17 June

Bessarion of Egypt, also known as Bessarion of Scetis or Bessarion the Great (4th century – 5th century) was an Egyptian Christian monk who lived around the 4th to 5th century in Egypt, wandering in the Nitrian Desert.

As a Desert Father, he is venerated as a saint by the Eastern Orthodox Church, Oriental Orthodox Church, and Roman Catholic Church, the former two commemorate him on 6 June while the latter commemorates him on 17 June.

== Biography ==
Much of what we know about the saint's life is recorded in the Sayings of the Desert Fathers. He was baptized in his teens, after which he set out on a pilgrimage to visit different holy sites. He visited some of the monasteries in the hinterland of Jordan, where he learned about monastic life.

Upon his return, he became a monk and was a disciple of St. Isidore of Pelusium. According to his hagiography, he chose to despise his own body, always sleeping in the open air without shelter, dressed only in a few rags, and withstood both heat and cold. He ate only once a week, spent his time wandering in the desert, always slept under the open sky, and never lay down, choosing always to remain standing or sitting. A legend says that once he remained for forty days and forty nights in prayer, abstaining from eating and sleeping. He died at a great age.

== Legends and miracles ==
The Sayings of the Desert Fathers, Bessarion received the gift of performing miracles from God, and would have used this ability to quench the thirst of his disciples, by using his prayer alone to make rivers flow in the desolate lands where he lived.

It is said that his humility was so great that once, while visiting a skete, seeing a priest chasing away a novice caught sinning, he ran to the two exclaiming, "I too am a sinner". His name is sometimes substituted for that of Saint Paphnutius of Thebes in the legend of the conversion of Saint Thaïs.
