= Pherme =

Former settlement in Egypt

Pherme was the location of a community of ascetic monks in the Nile Delta in Egypt which grew after the 4th century CE as a satellite community of the better known community of Kellia ('the cells').

The site of the monastic remains at Pherme, located 11 kilometres (6.8 mi) southeast of central Kellia, escaped some of the water damage suffered by the lower Kellia site because of its higher elevation. Today the site contains some 115 monastic hermitages, only ten of which were excavated by Swiss archaeologists during digs from 1987 to 1989.

Pherme is mentioned in the Apophthegmata Patrum (Sayings of the Desert Fathers) as the dwelling of several Desert Fathers, including Abba Theodore of Pherme and Abba Lucius.
