= Origenist crises =

Christian theological controversies

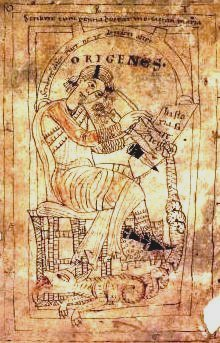
Representation of Origen writing from a manuscript of In numeros homilia XXVII dated to c. 1160

The Origenist crises or Origenist controversies were two major theological controversies in early Christianity involving the teachings of followers of the third-century Alexandrian theologian Origen (c. 184 – c. 253).

The First Origenist Crisis began in the late fourth century in Palestine and later spread to Egypt. It dealt with ideas discussed in some of Origen's writings that some members of the church hierarchy deemed heretical. Objections against Origen's writings and demands for his condemnation were first raised by Epiphanius of Salamis and later taken up by Jerome and Theophilus of Alexandria, who were both initially supporters of Origen's teachings. Origen's defenders included Tyrannius Rufinus and John II, Bishop of Jerusalem.

During the crisis, Theophilus condemned Origen's incorporeal, non-anthropomorphic conception of God, a view which Theophilus himself had previously vocally supported. The crisis concluded with John Chrysostom, the Patriarch of Constantinople, being removed from his position at the Synod of the Oak in 403 for harboring Origenist monks who had been banished from Alexandria.

The Second Origenist Crisis occurred in the 6th century during the reign of Justinian I. It is less well-documented than the first crisis and dealt more with the ideas of groups influenced by Origen rather than with Origen's actual writings. It concluded with the Second Council of Constantinople possibly issuing an anathema against Origen in 553, although scholars dispute whether the Council actually issued the anathema condemning Origen or if it was added later.

== First Origenist Crisis ==
=== Palestinian phase ===
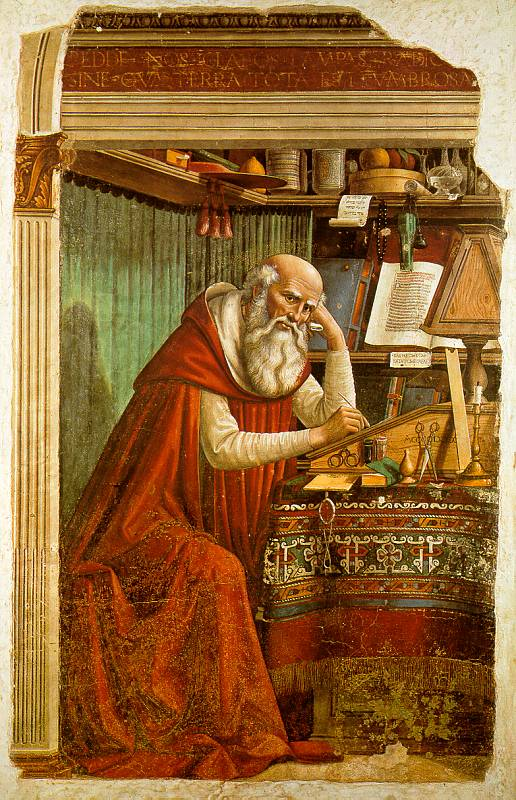
St. Jerome in His Study (1480), by Domenico Ghirlandaio. Although initially a student of Origen's teachings, Jerome turned against him during the First Origenist Crisis. He nonetheless remained influenced by Origen's teachings for his entire life.

The first Origenist crisis began in the late fourth century, coinciding with the beginning of monasticism in Palestine. The first stirring of the controversy came from the Cyprian bishop Epiphanius of Salamis, who was determined to root out all heresies and refute them. Epiphanius attacked Origen in his anti-heretical treatises Ancoratus (375) and Panarion (376), compiling a list of teachings Origen had espoused that Epiphanius regarded as heretical. Epiphanius's treatises portray Origen as an originally orthodox Christian who had been corrupted and turned into a heretic by the evils of "Greek education". Epiphanius particularly objected to Origen's Subordinationism, his "excessive" use of allegorical hermeneutic, and his habit of proposing ideas about the Bible "speculatively, as exercises" rather than "dogmatically".

Epiphanius asked John II, Bishop of Jerusalem to condemn Origen as a heretic. John refused because a person could not be retroactively condemned as a heretic after death. In 393, a monk named Atarbius advanced a petition to have Origen and his writings to be censured. Tyrannius Rufinus, a priest at the monastery on the Mount of Olives who had been ordained by John of Jerusalem and was a longtime admirer of Origen, rejected the petition outright. Rufinus's close friend and associate Jerome, who had also studied Origen, however, came to agree with the petition. Around the same time, John Cassian introduced Origen's teachings to the West.

In 394, Epiphanius wrote to John of Jerusalem, again asking for Origen to be condemned, insisting that Origen's writings denigrated human sexual reproduction and accused him of being an Encratite. John once again denied this request. By 395, Jerome had allied himself with the anti-Origenists and begged John of Jerusalem to condemn Origen, a plea which John once again refused. Epiphanius launched a campaign against John, openly preaching that John was an Origenist deviant. He successfully persuaded Jerome to break communion with John and ordained Jerome's brother Paulinianus as a priest in defiance of John's authority.

Meanwhile, in 397, Rufinus published a Latin translation of Origen's On First Principles. Rufinus was convinced that heretics had interpolated Origen's original treatise and that these interpolations were the source of the heterodox teachings found in it. He therefore heavily modified Origen's text, omitting and altering any parts that disagreed with contemporary Christian orthodoxy. In the introduction to this translation, Rufinus mentioned that Jerome had studied under Origen's disciple Didymus the Blind, implying that Jerome was a follower of Origen. Jerome was so incensed by this that he resolved to produce his Latin translation of On the First Principles, in which he promised to translate every word exactly as it was written and lay bare Origen's heresies to the whole world. Jerome's translation has been lost in its entirety.

=== Egyptian phase ===
In 399, the Origenist crisis reached Egypt. Theophilus of Alexandria was sympathetic to the supporters of Origen and the church historian, Sozomen, records that he had openly preached the Origenist teaching that God was incorporeal. In his Festal Letter of 399, he denounced those who believed that God had a literal, human-like body, calling them illiterate "simple ones". A large mob of Alexandrian monks who regarded God as anthropomorphic rioted in the streets. According to the church historian Socrates Scholasticus, in order to prevent a riot, Theophilus made a sudden about-face and began denouncing Origen. In the year 400, Theophilus summoned a council in Alexandria, which condemned Origen and all his followers as heretics for having taught that God was incorporeal, which they decreed contradicted the only true and orthodox position, which was that God had a literal, physical body resembling that of a human. (Note: Socrates Scholasticus describes this condemnation as a deception to gain the confidence of the Alexandrian monastic community, which vehemently upheld the teaching of an anthropomorphic Deity.)

Theophilus labelled Origen himself as the "hydra of all heresies" and persuaded Pope Anastasius I to sign the letter of the council, which primarily denounced the teachings of the Nitrian monks associated with Evagrius Ponticus. In 402, Theophilus expelled Origenist monks from Egyptian monasteries (including Isaac of the Cells) and banished the four monks known as the "Tall Brothers", who were leaders of the Nitrian community. John Chrysostom, the Patriarch of Constantinople, granted the Tall Brothers asylum, a fact which Theophilus used to orchestrate John's condemnation and removal from his position at the Synod of the Oak in July of 403. Once John Chrysostom had been deposed, Theophilus restored normal relations with the Origenist monks in Egypt and the first Origenist crisis came to an end.

== Second Origenist Crisis ==
=== Beginning of the crisis ===
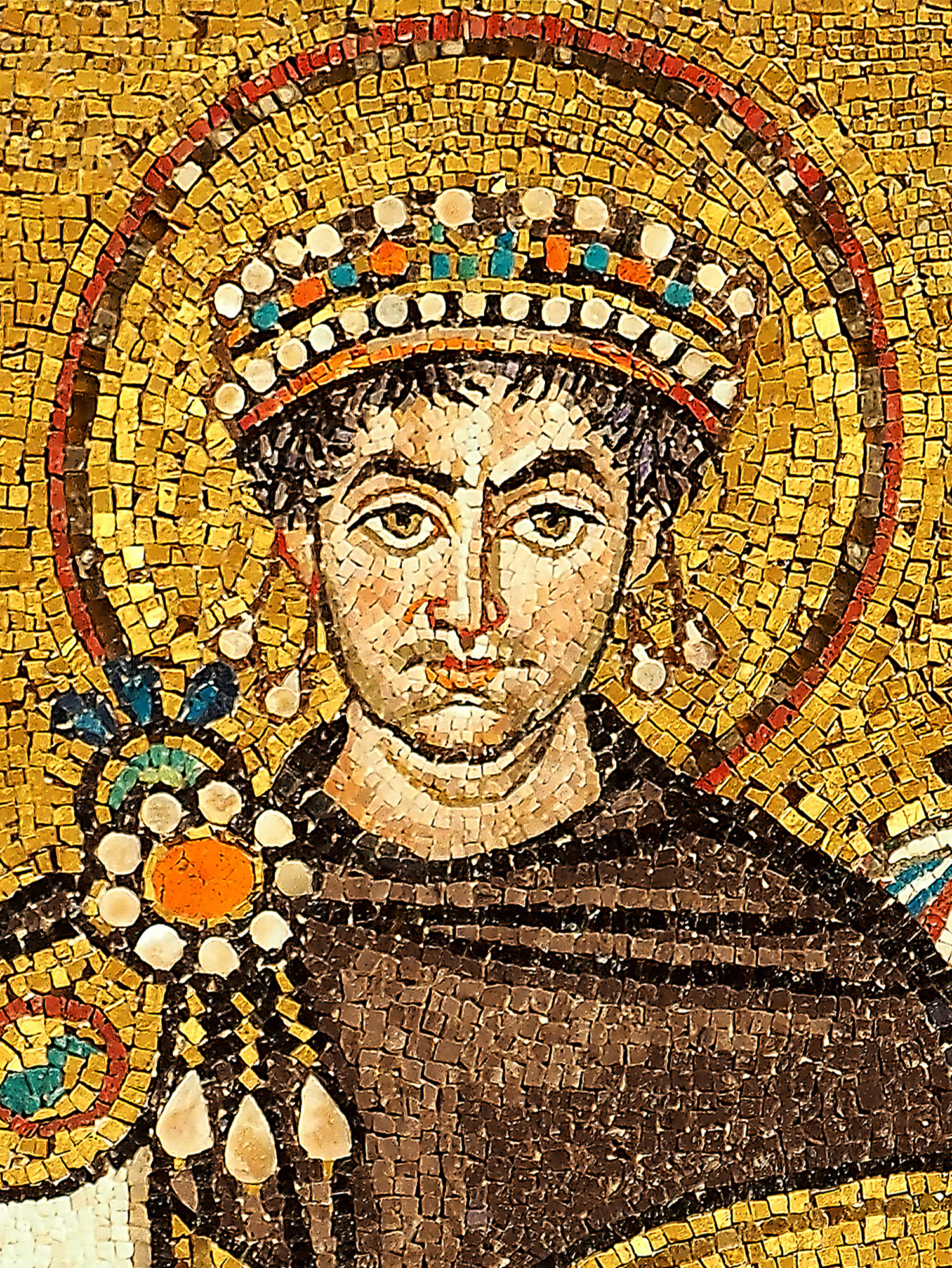
The Emperor Justinian I, shown here in a contemporary mosaic portrait from Ravenna, denounced Origen as a heretic and ordered all of his writings to be burned.

The Second Origenist Crisis occurred in the sixth century, during the height of Byzantine monasticism. Although the Second Origenist Crisis is not nearly as well documented as the first, it seems to have primarily concerned the teachings of Origen's later followers, rather than anything Origen himself had actually written. Origen's disciple Evagrius Ponticus had advocated contemplative prayer, but other monastic communities prioritized asceticism in prayer, emphasizing fasting, labors, and vigils. Some Origenist monks in Palestine, referred to by their enemies as "Isochristoi" (meaning "those who would assume equality with Christ"), emphasized Origen's teaching of the pre-existence of souls and held that all souls were originally equal to Christ's and would become equal again at the end of time. Another faction of Origenists in the same region instead insisted that Christ was the "leader of many brethren", as the first-created being. This faction was more moderate and they were referred to by their opponents as "Protoktistoi" ("First Createds"). Both factions accused the other of heresy and other Christians accused both of them of heresy.

The Protoktistoi appealed to the Emperor Justinian I to condemn the Isochristoi of heresy through Pelagius, the papal apocrisiarius. In 543 AD, Pelagius presented Justinian with documents, including a letter denouncing Origen written by Patriarch Mennas of Constantinople, along with excerpts from Origen's On First Principles and several anathemata against Origen. A domestic synod convened to address the issue concluded that the Isochristoi's teachings were heretical and, seeing Origen as the ultimate culprit behind the heresy, denounced Origen himself as a heretic as well. Emperor Justinian ordered for all of Origen's writings to be burned. In the west, the Decretum Gelasianum, which was written sometime between 519 and 553, listed Origen as an author whose writings were to be categorically banned.

=== Second Council of Constantinople ===
In 553, during the early days of the Second Council of Constantinople (the Fifth Ecumenical Council), when Pope Vigilius was still refusing to take part in it, despite Justinian holding him hostage, the bishops at the council ratified an open letter which condemned Origen as the leader of the Isochristoi. The letter was not part of the official acts of the council and it more or less repeated the edict issued by the Synod of Constantinople in 543. It cites objectionable writings attributed to Origen, but all the writings referred to in it were actually written by Evagrius Ponticus. After the council officially opened, but while Pope Vigillius was still refusing to take part, Justinian presented the bishops with the problem of a text known as The Three Chapters, which attacked the Antiochene Christology.

The bishops drew up a list of anathemata against the heretical teachings contained within The Three Chapters and those associated with them. In the official text of the eleventh anathema, Origen is condemned as a Christological heretic, but Origen's name does not appear at all in the Homonoia, the first draft of the anathemata issued by the imperial chancery, nor does it appear in the version of the conciliar proceedings that was eventually signed by Pope Vigillius, a long time afterwards. These discrepancies may indicate that Origen's name may have been retrospectively inserted into the text after the Council. Some authorities believe these anathemata belong to an earlier local synod. Even if Origen's name did appear in the original text of the anathema, the teachings attributed to Origen that are condemned in the anathema were actually the ideas of later Origenists, which had very little grounding in anything Origen himself had actually written. In fact, Popes Vigilius (537–555), Pelagius I (556–561), Pelagius II (579–590), and Gregory the Great (590–604) were only aware that the Fifth Council specifically dealt with The Three Chapters and make no mention of Origenism or Universalism, nor spoke as if they knew of its condemnation—even though Gregory the Great was opposed to Universalism.
