= Cronius of Nitria =

4th-century Egyptian Christian monk

- Born: c. 285; Egypt
- Residence: Nitria
- Died: c. 386; Egypt

Cronius of Nitria (c. 285 – c. 386) was an Egyptian Christian monk who lived in Nitria, Lower Egypt. He was one of the Desert Fathers.

== Biography ==
Cronius was born about 285 A.D. He first lived in a monastery. Later, he left the monastery to serve as a Greek interpreter for Anthony the Great. Afterwards, Cronius became an anchorite and priest in Nitria. His disciples included Isaac of the Cells. He died around 386 A.D.
