= Origenism =

Christian theological beliefs

Origenism refers to a set of beliefs attributed to the Christian theologian Origen of Alexandria. The main principles of Origenism include allegorical interpretation of scripture, pre-existence, and subordinationism. Origen's thought was influenced by Philo the Jew, Platonism and Clement of Alexandria.

== Principles ==
=== Creation ===
Origen taught that creation is eternal, claiming that God created from eternity. He argued that God created four categories of intellectual beings: angels, luminaries, humans and demons. He interpreted the book of Genesis allegorically and was influenced by Philo the Jew.

=== Trinity ===
Origen believed that the persons of the trinity are immaterial and that the Son is the Wisdom of God and subordinate to the Father; for Origen, the Father has the highest rank over the other persons of the Trinity.

=== Exegesis ===
Origen believed that the words of the scriptures have multiple meanings, arguing that some parts of the Bible would be unworthy of God if they would be taken only literally.

=== Soteriology ===
Origen theorized that all rational beings benefit from the redemption, stating: "We think that the goodness of God, through the mediation of Christ, will bring all creatures to one and the same end", resulting in universal restoration.

One error, according to Catholic doctrine, of Origenism includes denying the eternity of Hell "...by a general rehabilitation of the damned, including, apparently, Satan." This error, while not considered a formal heresy, was condemned at a synod in 548 AD, which was subsequently confirmed by Pope Vigilius.

=== Transmigration of Rational Souls ===
Jerome of Stridon reported that Origen used Jacob's Ladder in Genesis as an allegory for a complex system of transmigration of rational natures between the ethereal bodies of angels, aerial bodies of daemons, and "gross" bodies of men and possibly animals. "That is to say, after they have borne the discipline of punishment and torture for a longer or a shorter time in human bodies, they may again reach the angelic pinnacles from which they have fallen. Hence it may be shown that we men may change into any other reasonable beings, and that not once only or on emergency but time after time; we and angels shall become demons if we neglect our duty; and demons, if they will take to themselves virtues, may attain to the rank of angels." Although an analogy to the story of Jacob's Ladder is not explicitly referred to in Origen's "On First Principles", the latter half of the first of four books comprising the work primarily focuses on using scripture and philosophical reasoning to justify the very same doctrine of transmigration of rational souls reported by Jerome.

=== Sacramentology ===
Origen believed in the necessity of infant baptism. Origen did not mention that the eucharist is a means of forgiveness.

=== Canon ===
Eusebius also records 22 canonical books of the Hebrews given by Origen: The twenty-two books of the Hebrews are the following: That which is called by us Genesis; Exodus; Leviticus; Numbers; Jesus, the son of Nave (Joshua book); Judges and Ruth in one book; the First and Second of Kings (1 Samuel and 2 Samuel) in one; the Third and Fourth of Kings (1 Kings and 2 Kings) in one; of the Chronicles, the First and Second in one; Esdras (Ezra–Nehemiah) in one; the book of Psalms; the Proverbs of Solomon; Ecclesiastes; the Song of Songs; Isaiah; Jeremiah, with Lamentations and the epistle (of Jeremiah) in one; Daniel; Ezekiel; Job; Esther. And besides these there are the Maccabees.

Some suspect that epistle of Jeremiah is interpolated to the canon list or also includes the book of Baruch.

Origen refers to doubts about the author of the book of Hebrews but accepted it as inspired, he also refers to doubts concerning the canonicity of the Book of Wisdom and 2 Peter.

=== Other ===
Origen advocated for pacifism, amillennialism, perpetual virginity of Mary and iconoclasm.

== History ==
Origenism influenced Rufinus, Arius, Jerome (although later wanting to condemn Origen), Firmillian, Pamphilus, Eusebius, Gregory of Nazianzus and Athanasius of Alexandria. Some have argued that iconoclasm was influenced by Origenism. Origenism in Egypt was condemned by Theophilus and later by the anathemas of the second council of Constantinople.

== See also ==
- Origenist crises, the controversy over Origen's ideas
- Meta-historical fall
