= Saint Amun =

4th-century Egyptian monastic founder

Saint Ammonas
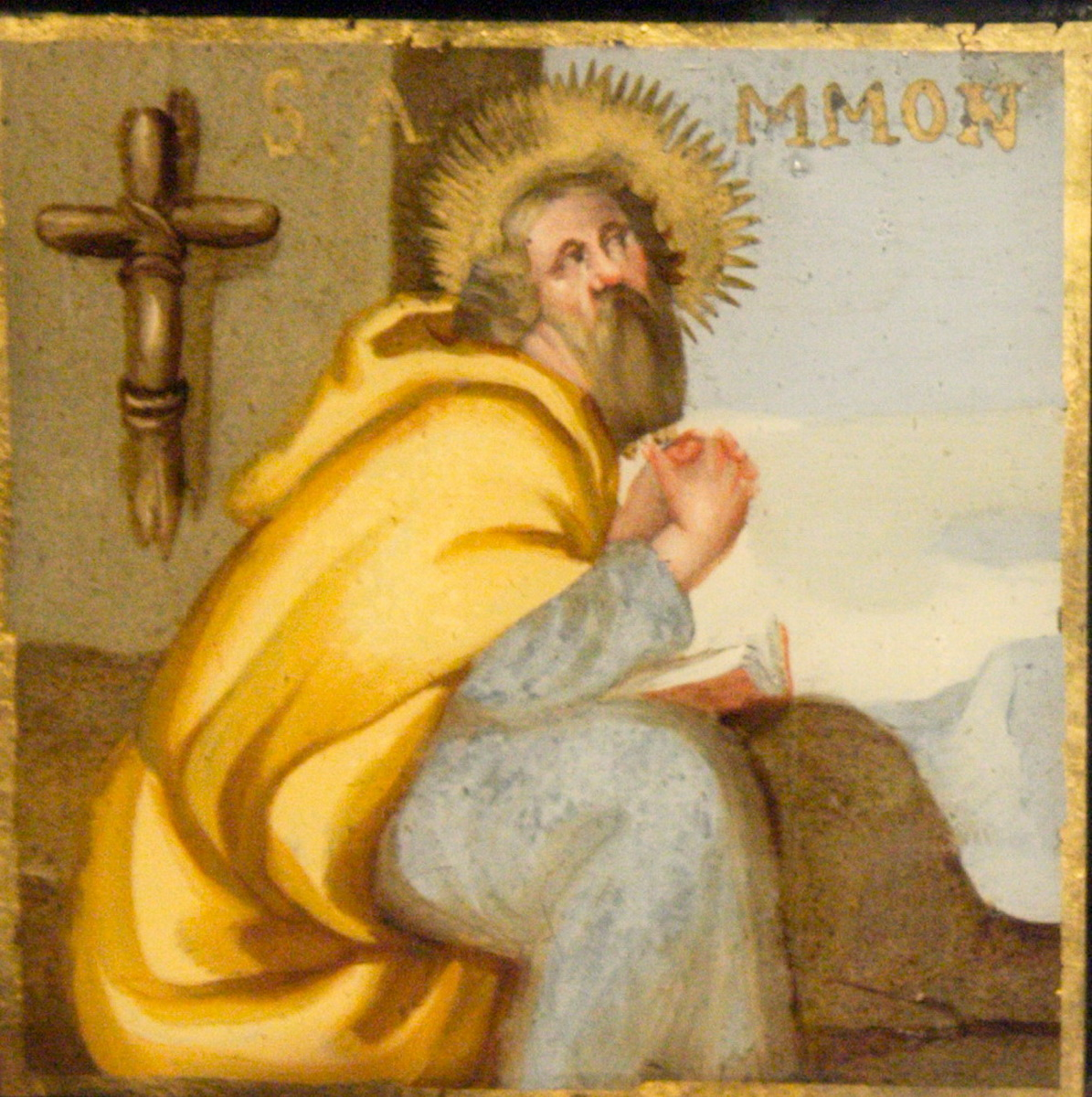

Desert Father Venerable, Hermit
- Born: 294; Mariotis, Egypt, Roman Empire
- Died: 356 (aged 62 years); Scetes, Egypt, Roman Empire
- Venerated in: Catholic Church; Eastern Orthodox Church; Oriental Orthodox Church; Anglican Communion
- Feast: 20 Pashons (i.e. 15 May Julian Calendar); 4 October (Byzantine Christianity); 8 November (Episcopal Church); 4 October (Catholic Church)

Ammon, Amun (Coptic: Ⲁⲃⲃⲁ Ⲁⲙⲟⲩⲛ), Ammonas (Ancient Greek: Ἀμμώνας), Amoun (Ἀμοῦν), or Ammonius the Hermit (/əˈmoʊniəs/; Greek: Ἀμμώνιος) was a 4th-century Christian ascetic and the founder of one of the most celebrated monastic communities in Egypt. He is named after Amun, the ancient Egyptian god. He was subsequently declared a saint. He was one of the most venerated ascetics of the Nitrian Desert, and Athanasius of Alexandria mentions him in his life of Anthony the Great.

== Life ==
Pushed into marriage by his family at the age of 20, he managed to persuade his bride to take a vow of chastity together with him by the authority of Paul's Epistle to the Corinthians. They lived together this way for 18 years, when at her wish, they parted, and he retired to Scetis and Nitria, to the south of Lake Mareotis, where he lived 22 years, visiting his sister-wife twice a year. She had founded a convent in her own house.

He cooperated with Anthony and gathered his monks under his direct supervision, thus forming a monastery from sole hermits. Traditionally, he is supposed to have been the first hermit to have established a monastery, known as Kellia, near Nitria. This is by no means verifiable, but it is more certain that Amun's piety and fame drew others to the region. He is considered to have died at the age of 62 years. His feast day is 4 October in the Eastern Orthodox and Catholic Churches. His feast in the Coptic Orthodox Church is on 20 Pashons.

He died before Anthony the Great from whom there is a surviving epistle written to him, that is, before the year 365, for the latter asserted that he "saw the soul of Amoun borne by angels to heaven." As Athanasius's history of Anthony preserves the order of time, he died perhaps about 320.

== Works ==
There are generally seventeen or nineteen Rules of Asceticism (κεφάλαια) ascribed to him; the Greek original exists in manuscript; they were published in the Latin version of Gerardus Vossius. Twenty-two Ascetic Institutions of the same Amoun, or one bearing the same name, exist also in manuscript. There is a collection of his letters in the Patrologia Orientalis, volume 10/6. His work 'Instructions: Counsel to Novices' also survives, in Greek, Latin, and English.

== Bibliography ==
- Herbermann, Charles, ed. (1913). "St. Ammon" . Catholic Encyclopedia. New York: Robert Appleton Company.
