= Macarius of Alexandria =

Monk in the Nitrian Desert

Saint Macarius of Alexandria
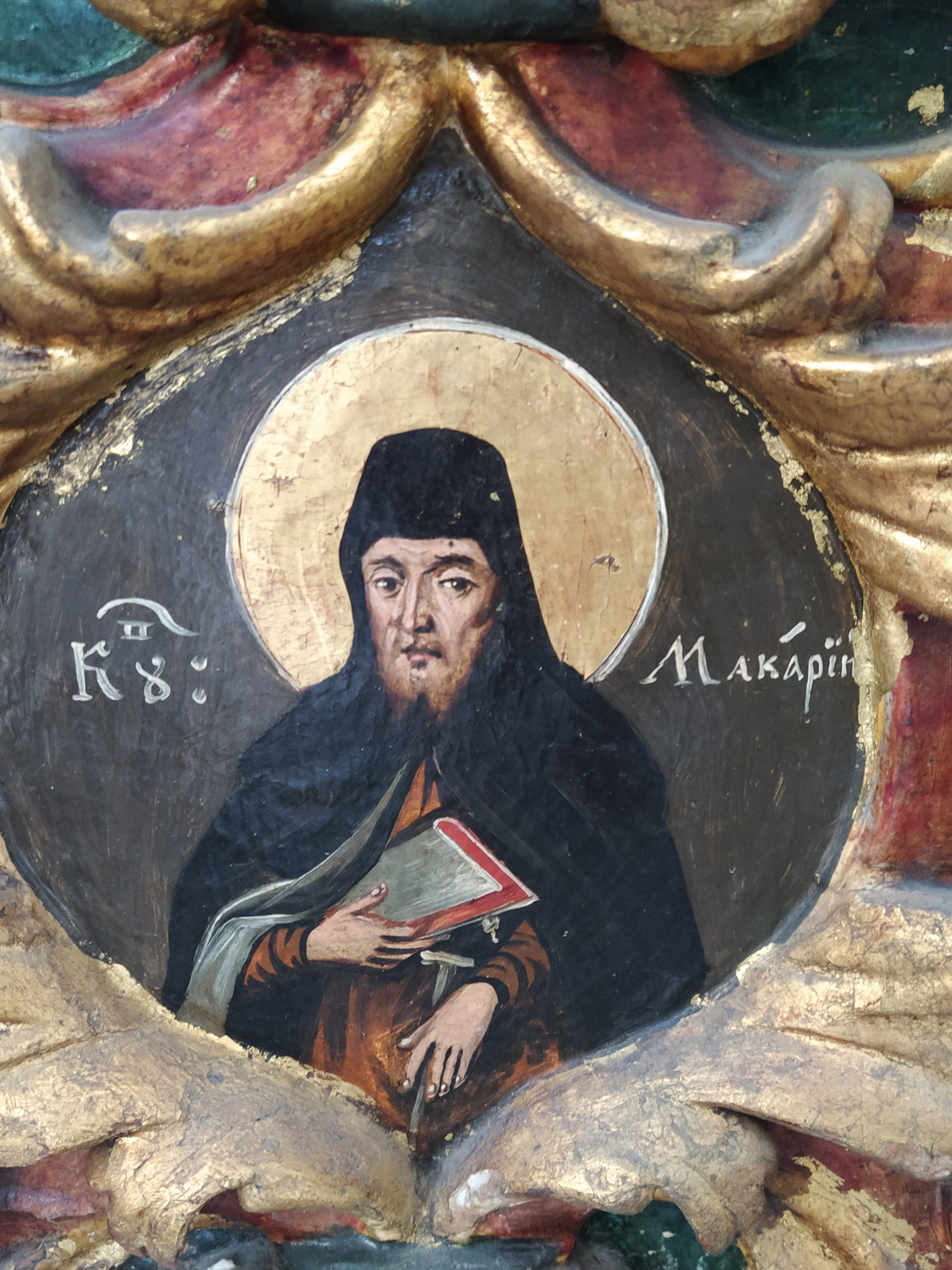

Monk, Ascetic
- Born: c. 300; Egypt
- Died: 395; Egypt
- Venerated in: Eastern Orthodox Church; Roman Catholic Church; Oriental Orthodoxy
- Feast: 19 January (Eastern Orthodox and Roman Catholic Church) 1 May (= 6 Pashons, 111 A.M.) (Coptic Orthodox)

Macarius of Alexandria (Greek: Μακάριος; died 395) was a monk in the Nitrian Desert. He was a slightly younger contemporary of Macarius of Egypt, and is thus also known as Macarius the Younger.

== Life ==
Macarius was born about the year 300 in Alexandria. He was a merchant selling confections until the age of 40, when he was baptized and went off into the desert. After several years of ascetic life, he was ordained a presbyter and appointed prior of a monastery known as the "Kellii", or "cells" in the Egyptian desert, between the Nitria mountain and a skete in which monastic hermits lived in silence, each in his own cell.

About the year 335, Macarius of Alexandria retired to live alone as a recluse in el-Natroun desert. Many miracles were ascribed to him. He presided over five thousand Nitric monks.

Having learned of the extremely strict rule for monastic life observed at the Tabbenesiot Monastery, whose prior was Pachomios the Great (+ 348), Macarius disguised himself in secular clothing, and over the course of the entire Quadragesima [the 40-day Great Lent] neither ate bread nor drank water. No one saw him eating or sitting down. He was making baskets of palm leaves while he was standing. The monks said to Pachomius: "Cast out this man from here, for he is not human." A divine inspiration subsequently revealed Macarius' identity to him, and the monks rushed to receive his blessings. Having demonstrated humility and taught a lesson to all, Macarius returned to his own monastery.

At the age of 73 Macarius of Alexandria was exiled by Emperor Valens, along with Macarius of Egypt to an island, which they subsequently Christianized.

According to Eastern Orthodox tradition, Macarius of Alexandria died on 2 January 395. According to the Coptic Orthodox tradition, he died on 1 May 395. (6 Pashons, 111 A.M.)

In addition to a monastic rule and three brief apothegms, a homily "On the End of the Souls of the Righteous and of Sinners" is ascribed to him, although excellent Vienna manuscripts assign the latter to a monk named Alexander. Palladius and Sozomen also mention a Macarius the Younger of Lower Egypt, who lived in a cell for more than twenty three years to atone for a murder which he had committed.
