= Nitria (monastic site) =

Christian monastic site in Egypt

Nitria (also called the Mountain of Nitria or Petoou Mpihosm in Greek and Latin sources) is one of the earliest Christian monastic sites in Egypt and is located in the Nitrian Desert. It was the first of the three major centers of Christian monastic activity in the Lower Egypt, the other two being Kellia and Scetis.

== History ==
Nitria was founded in c. 325–330 by Amoun of Nitria and quickly attracted thousands of monks through the remainder of the 4th century. By 390, it had evolved from a loose collection of solitary monks to an organized settlement of multiple cenobitic monasteries. Jerome, who visited Nitria in 386, said that it had over five-thousand monks. Palladius of Galatia, who lived there in 390, gave a similar estimate in his Lausaic History.

Christian pilgrims from the nearby city of Alexandria visited Nitria in large numbers, the monks servicing their needs. There were also bankers and merchants. Other monks sought more remote areas, away from tourists and merchants, and established a monastic center in Kellia c. 338.

The monastic population in Nitria declined during the fifth and sixth centuries, and the site was abandoned sometime in the middle of the seventh century. Nitria should not be confused with the monasteries at Wadi El Natrun (formally known as Scetis), which are still in existence.

== Onomatology ==
Nitria was named after a nearby town which took its name from the natural deposits of natron, a salt used by the Ancient Egyptians in the embalming of mummies. The English and German word "natron" was first a French cognate which has its origin from the Spanish "natrón" through Latin "natrium" and Greek "nitron" (νίτρον). This root derives from the Ancient Egyptian word "nṯrj". Natron refers to Wadi El Natrun (English: Natron Valley) in Egypt, where natron salt was mined by the ancient Copts and Egyptians. Natron was also used for washing garments. This led to the symbolism that Nitria is where men's sins were washed away.

Although Nitria is often called the Mountain of Nitria, there is little geographical elevation difference between Nitria and the surrounding region. It was likely called this referring to Matthew 5:14 where Jesus describes his followers as being a "city on a hill".

== Location ==
Nitria is in Lower Egypt (modern day Northern Egypt)

The ancient site of Nitria was located by the archaeologist Hugh Evelyn-White (1884-1924) sometime between 1917 and 1922. It is located approximately 13.7 Kilometers southwest of Damanhur by the village of Al Barnuji, 19.3 Kilometers from Kellia, and about 50 Kilometers south of Alexandria. The coordinates of Nitria are 30.928651°N, 30.385628°E. Nitria is not as far in the desert at Scetis, and according to Historia Monachorum in Aegypto, it takes 24 hours to walk from Nitria to Scetis.

== List ==
Partial list of notable monks who lived at Nitria.

- Or of Nitria
- Serapion of Nitria
- Amoun of Nitria
- Cronius of Nitria
- Anthony the Great
- Bessarion of Egypt
- Chaeremon of Nitria
- The Tall Brothers
- Isaac of the Cells
- John of Egypt
- Macarius of Alexandria
- Macarius of Egypt
- Albianos
- Pambo
- Pishoy
- Sisoes the Great
- Ammonas of Egypt

== See also ==
- Desert Fathers
- Eastern Orthodox Church
