= Wadi El Natrun =

Geographic depression in Beheira, Egypt

Wadi El Natrun: ϣⲓϩⲏⲧ (Coptic); وادي النطرون (Arabic)
- Depression
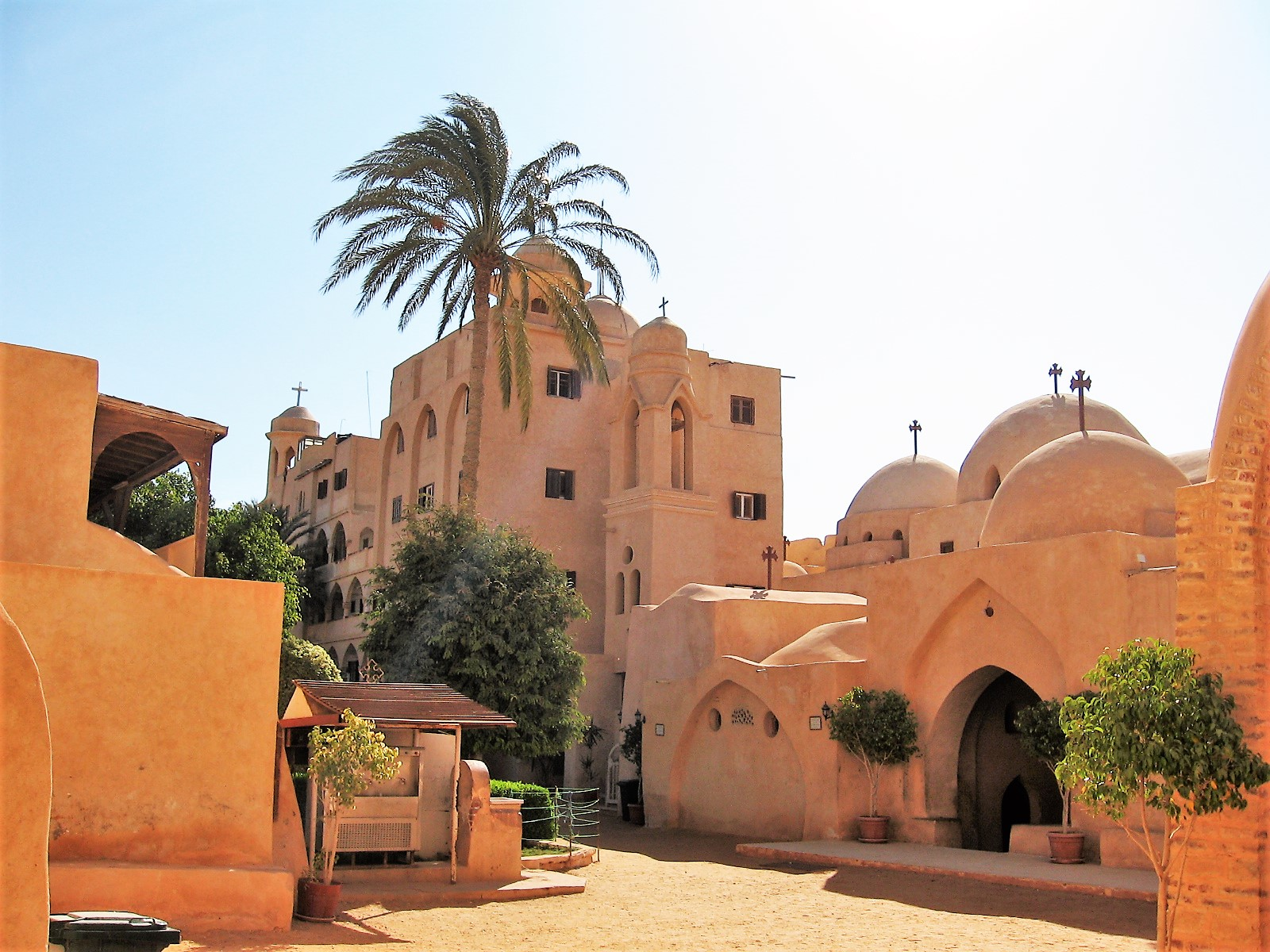
- Monastery of the Syriacs in Wadi el Natrun

- Location in Egypt
- Coordinates: 30°35′N 30°20′E
- Country: Egypt
- Governorate: Beheira

Area
  - Total: 265.7 sq mi (688.2 km^{2})

Population (2021)
  - Total: 88,380
  - Density: 332.6/sq mi (128.4/km^{2})
- Time zone: UTC+2 (EET)
  - Summer (DST): UTC+3 (EEST)

Wadi El Natrun (Arabic: وادي النطرون, lit. 'Valley of Natron'; Coptic: Ϣⲓϩⲏⲧ, romanized: Šihēt, lit. 'measure of the heart') is a depression in northern Egypt that is located 23 m (75 ft) below sea level and 38 m (125 ft) below the Nile River level. The valley contains several alkaline lakes, natron-rich salt deposits, salt marshes and freshwater marshes.

In Christian literature, the region is usually referred to as Scetis (Σκήτις in Hellenistic Greek) or Skete (Σκήτη, plural Σκήτες in ecclesiastical Greek). It is one of the three early Christian monastic centres located in the Nitrian Desert of the northwestern Nile Delta. The other two monastic centres are Nitria and Kellia. Scetis, now called Wadi El Natrun, is best known today for its ancient monasteries that still remain in use, unlike Nitria and Kellia, which only have archaeological remains. The desertified valley around Scetis in particular may be called the Desert of Scetis.

== Geography ==
Wadi al-Natrun is the common name for a desert valley located west of the Nile Delta, along the El Tahrir Markaz, which is about 10 km west of the entrance to Sadat City on the Cairo-Alexandria desert road, and about 50 km from Khatatba on the Rosetta Branch of the Nile. The depression falls about 50 metres below the surface of its surrounding plateau. Its length ranges between 55 and 60 km, its average width is 10 km and its deepest point reaches 24 meters below sea level. The depression is the smallest in the Egyptian Western Desert, with an area of about 500 km^{2}. It is topographically rather than a true valley. Because the region is a closed depression with a distinct beginning and end with no water source, estuary or tributaries, the usage of the term "Wadi" is not technically correct.

The Wadi contains 12 lakes, which have a total surface area of 10 km^{2} and an average depth of only 2 metres. The colour of these lakes is reddish-blue because their water is saturated with natron salt.

== History ==
=== Fossil discoveries ===
Fossils dating to the Pliocene era (5.3–2.6 million years ago) have been discovered in the Wadi El Natrun region, including the long-snouted crocodile Euthecodon, softshell turtles, the camel Paracamelus, the three-toed hipparionine equine Cormohipparion, the primitive hippopotamus Archaeopotamus andrewsi, antelope including reedbuck (Redunca) and Alcelaphinae, and the elephant relative Deinotherium.

=== Ancient history ===
sxt t N23 H mA A t zmn D12 Z2 niwt
sḫt ḥmꜣwt
in hieroglyphs
Era: 1st Intermediate Period
(2181–2055 BC)

The Natron Valley is first attested in the ancient Egyptian literary work The Eloquent Peasant, and it is mentioned among the list of seven oases in the Temple of Edfu. During the Ptolemaic era, it constituted part of the Nitrite Nome (Ancient Greek: Νιτριώτης νομός). It was also known in Coptic as the Mountain of Salt (Coptic: ⲡⲧⲱⲟⲩ ⲙⲡϩⲙⲟⲩ) or Phanihosem (Coptic: ⲫⲁⲛⲓϩⲟⲥⲉⲙ, lit. 'the one (place) on the natron').

The importance of the Natrun Valley dates back to the Pharaonic era, as the ancient Egyptians and Libyans fought numerous battles there. This conflict ended with the Egyptians overcoming their rivals and annexing the eastern side of the desert, which remains part of Egypt today. Although Wadi al-Natrun became an administrative part of the country during the Pharaonic era, little information about its history during that period has been discovered. The latest discovered writings on the wars between the Libu and the Egyptians indicate that the final war occurred in 1170 BC, during the reign of Ramesses III.

As for the religious significance of Wadi al-Natrun, many discoveries indicate that the area was considered sacred as early as year 2000 BCE at the very least. Among these discoveries is a black granite bust dating back to the Seventeenth Dynasty, as well as a granite gate and stones from the lintel of a door bearing cartouches of King Amenemhat I, found at a site known as Al-Dahr (the backbone).

=== Economic history ===
The alkaline lakes of the Natron Valley provided the ancient Egyptians with the sodium bicarbonate used in mummification and in Egyptian faience, and later by the Romans as a flux for glass making. Wadi El Natrun was likely one of the most important centres for primary glass production in Roman Egypt, supplying the provinces of the Roman Empire with raw glass material. Excavations have revealed remains of large rectangular melting furnaces. After a tank furnace had cooled down completely, its vaulted roof was dismantled, and the resulting glass block was extracted and dispatched for further processing. This design form was probably chosen to facilitate the transport of the produced raw glass blocks to secondary workshops, which themselves might not had direct access to the necessary raw materials. Ouest Embiez 1, an early 3rd-century shipwreck discovered off the southern coast of Gallia, was carrying cargo of raw glass in blocks of different sizes, totaling around 15 to 18 tonnes, which appears to confirm the export of raw glass from the eastern provinces to some extent.

The Egyptian Salt and Soda Company Railway was a 33-mile-long (54 km) narrow-gauge railway with a track width of 750 mm built at the end of the 19th century, which attracted the first tourists to the Wadi.

=== Monastic history ===
The desolate region became one of Christianity's most sacred areas. The Desert Fathers and cenobitic monastic communities used the desert's solitude and privations to develop self-discipline (asceticism). Hermit monks believed that desert life would teach them to eschew the things of this world and follow God's call. Between the 4th and 7th centuries AD, hundreds of thousands of people from around the world over joined the hundreds of Christian monasteries in the Nitrian Desert, centred on Nitria, Kellia and Scetis (Wadi El Natrun).

Saint Macarius of Egypt first travelled to Scetis around 330 AD, where he established a solitary monastic site. His reputation attracted a loose band of anchorites, hermits and monks who settled nearby in individual cells. Many of them came from nearby Nitria and Kellia where they had previous experience in solitary desert living; thus the earliest cenobitic communities were a loose consolidation of like-minded monks. By the end of the fourth century, four distinct communities had developed: Baramus, Macarius, Bishoi and John Kolobos. At first these communities were groupings of cells centered on a communal church and facilities, but defensive walls and watchtowers were constructed over time in response to raids from desert nomads. Nitria, Kellia, and Scetis also experienced internal fractures related to doctrinal disputes in Egypt. At its peak the place contained 700 monasteries. The monasteries flourished during the Muslim conquest of Egypt (639–642), but in the eighth and ninth centuries, taxation and administration concerns led to conflicts with the Muslim Abbasid government of Egypt.

==== Invasion of Scetis ====
Scetis was attacked by the Mazices who "came sweeping off the Libyan desert" in 407-408 AD and was decimated, causing many notable Desert Fathers to leave the region, such as Abba Anoub. One of the survivors, St. Arsenius the Great, remarked in 410 that, "The world has lost Rome and the monks have lost Scetis." As the Jesuit historian and Professor Willian J. Harmless said, "Scetis’s destruction marked a turning point in the history of early Christian monasticism. The site would be resettled a few years later, and in fact would suffer other raids, notably in 434, 444, and 570."

Nitria and Kellia were eventually abandoned in the 7th and 9th centuries respectively, but Scetis continued to be inhabited throughout the Medieval period. Although some of the individual monasteries were eventually abandoned or destroyed, four have remained in use to the present day:

- Monastery of Saint Macarius the Great
- Paromeos Monastery
- Monastery of Saint Pishoy
- Syrian Monastery

Some of the most renowned saints of the region include the various Desert Fathers, including Saint Amun, Saint Arsenius, Saint John Cassian, Saint Isidore of Scété, Saint John the Dwarf, Saint Macarius of Egypt, Saint Macarius of Alexandria, Saint Moses the Black, Saint Pishoy, Sts. Maximos and Domatios, Saint Poimen The Great and Saint Samuel the Confessor.

To this day Wadi El Natrun remains the most important center of Coptic monasticism in Egypt.

=== Saint-Exupéry's plane crash ===
The environs of Wadi Natrun have been identified as the likely site of where French aviator Antoine de Saint-Exupéry crashed on December 30, 1935. After miraculously surviving the crash, Antoine and his plane mechanic nearly died of thirst before being rescued by a Bedouin nomad. Saint-Exupéry documented his experience in his book Wind, Sand and Stars. The event is thought to have inspired his most famous work, The Little Prince.

== Gallery ==
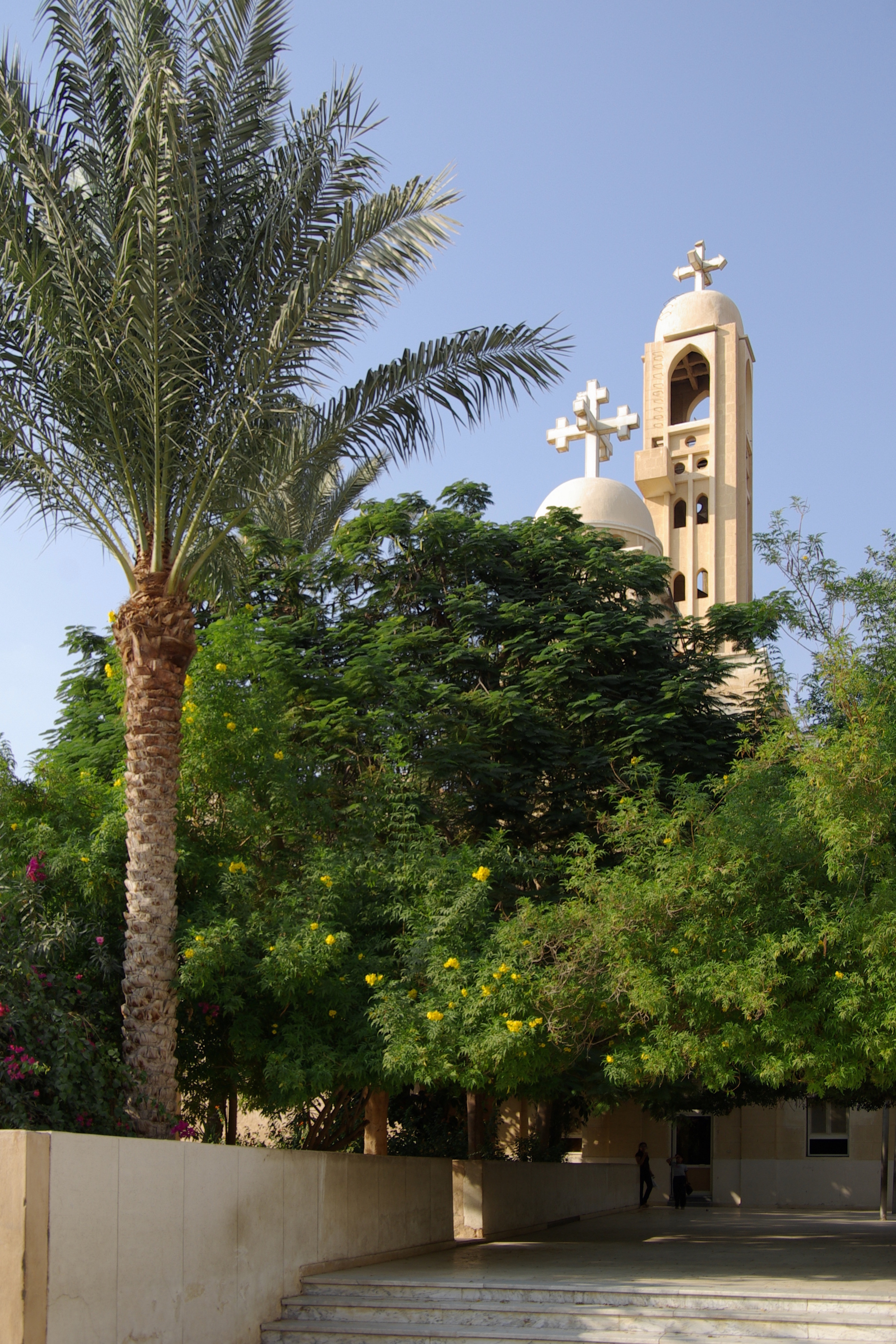
Monastery of Saint Pishoy, Scetes, Egypt

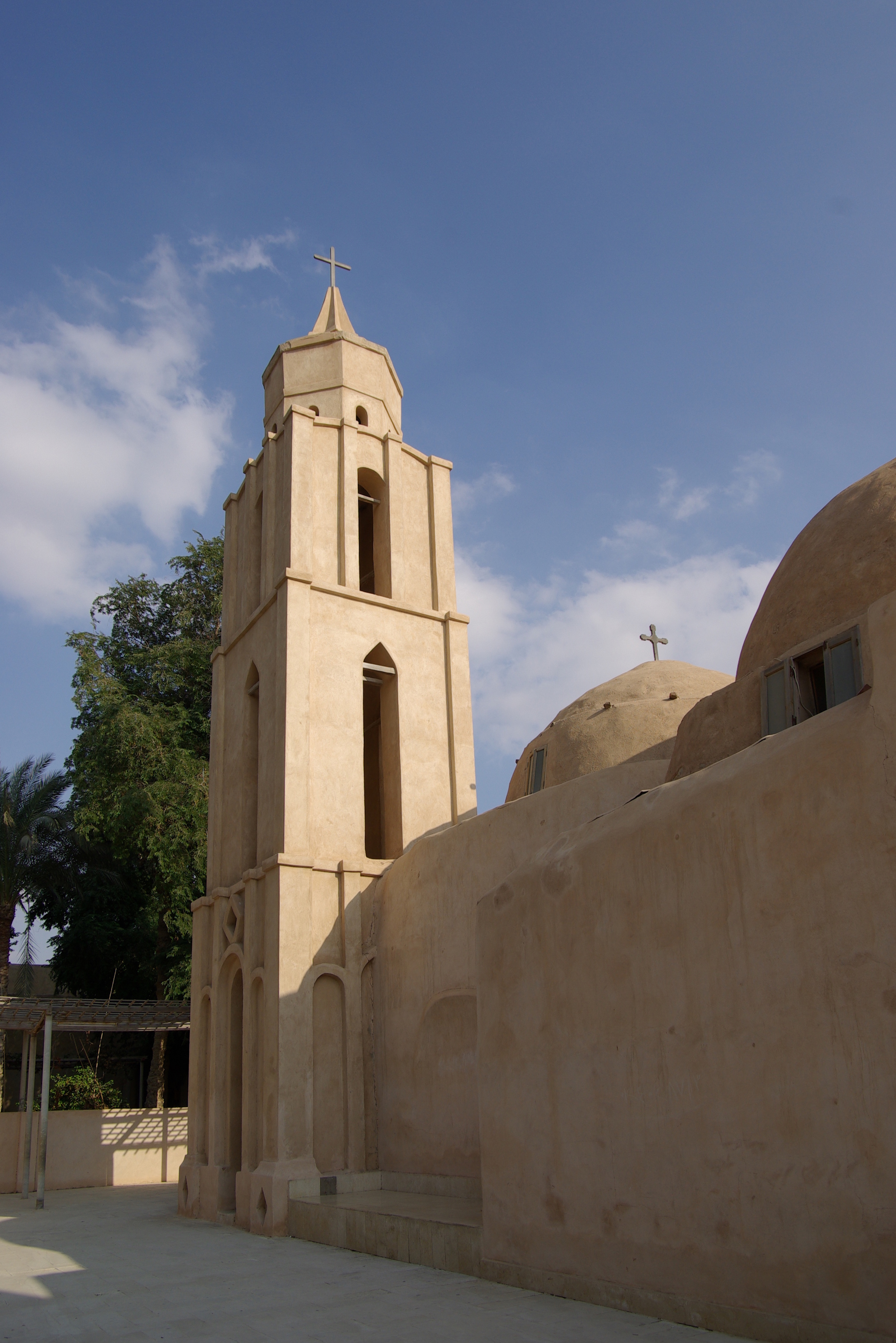
Monastery of Saint Pishoy, Scetes, Egypt

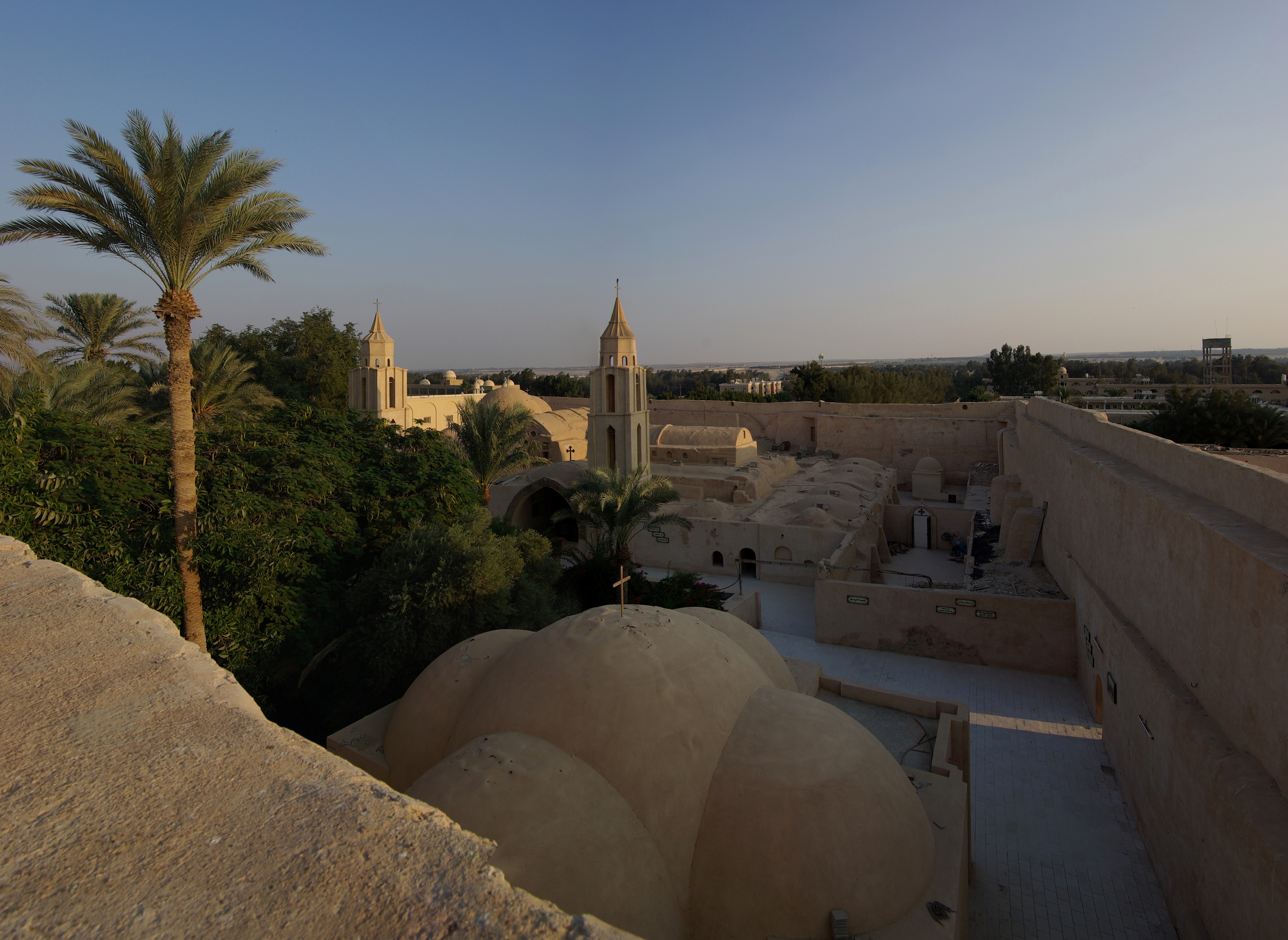
Monastery of Saint Pishoy, Scetes, Egypt

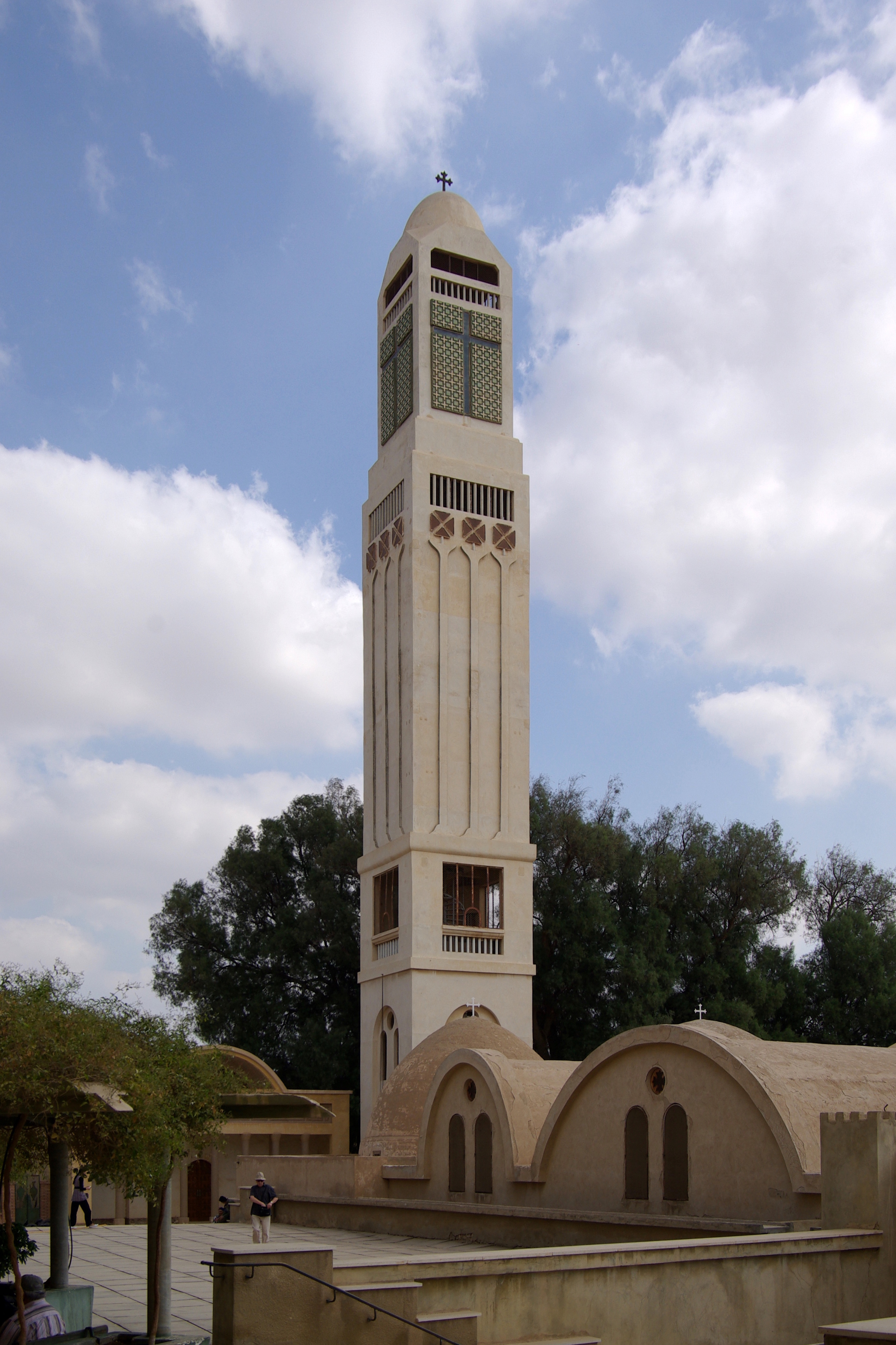
Monastery of Saint Macarius the Great, Scetes, Egypt

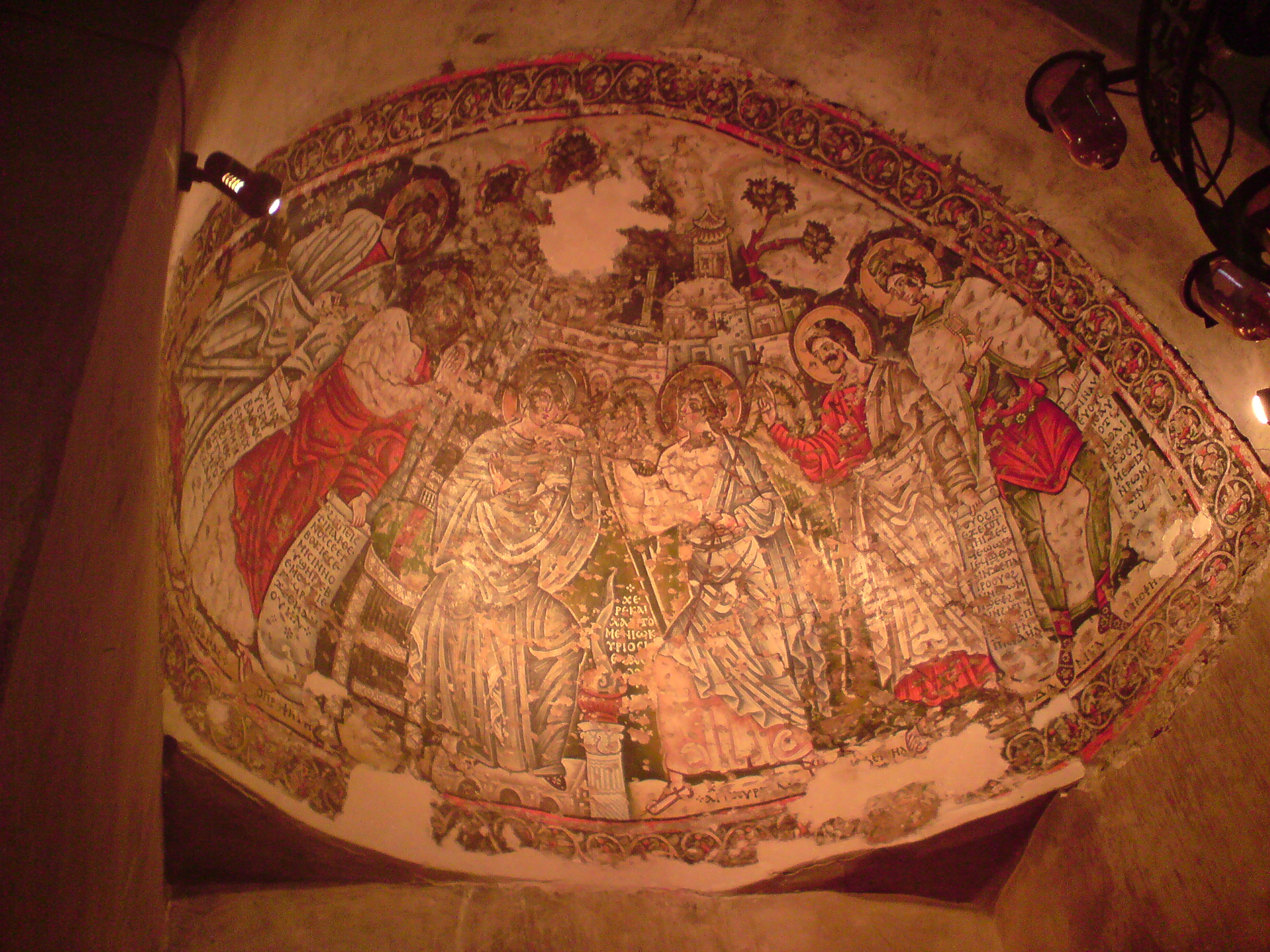
Frescos at the Syrian Monastery, Scetes, Egypt

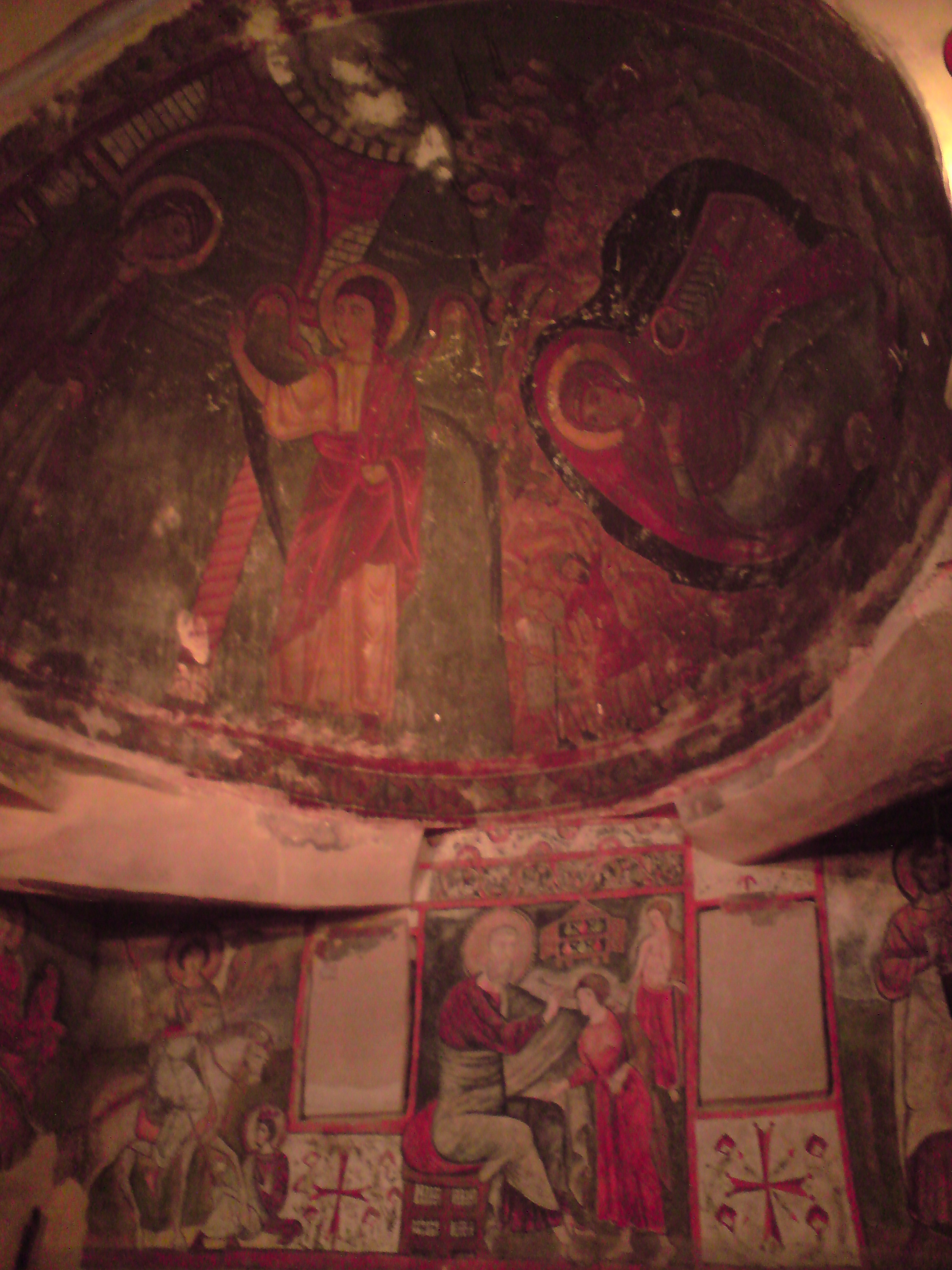
Frescos at the Syrian Monastery, Scetes, Egypt

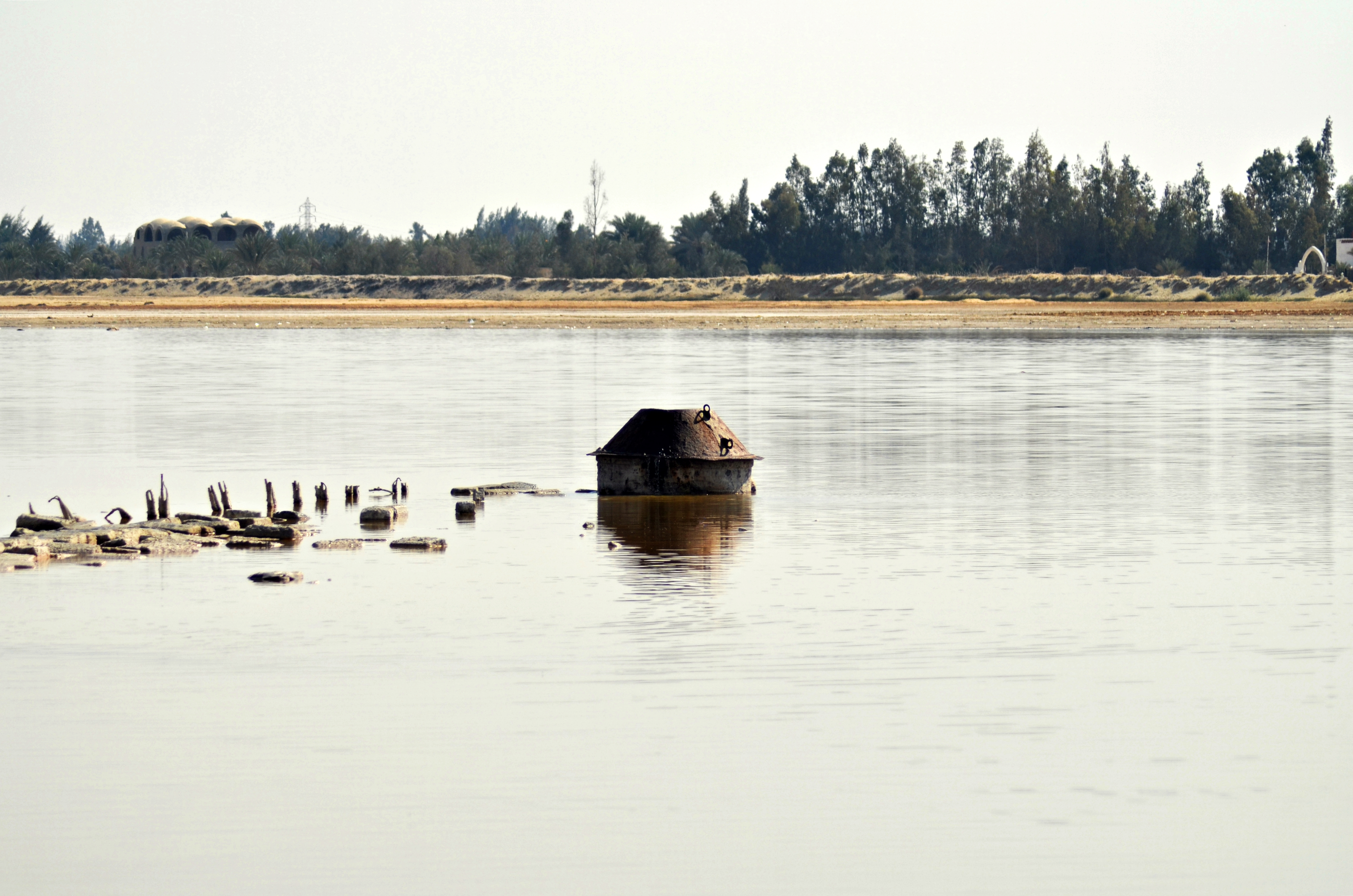
Naba' El-Hamra Lake, Wadi El Natrun, Egypt

== See also ==
- Skete
- Door of Prophecies
- Pikrolimni (lake)
- Pachomian monasteries
