= Tall Brothers =

Egyptian Christian monks

The Tall Brothers (also known as the Four Tall Brothers) were four brothers among the Egyptian monks of Nitria in the fifth century by the names of Ammonius, Dioscorus, Eusebius, and Euthymius. They were referred to as the "Tall Brothers" because they were tall in stature and commanding in appearance.

They were famous for their strict fasting, chastity, and knowledge of the Bible but were controversial for their support of the contested theology of Origen of Alexandria. Opposed by Pope Theophilus I of Alexandria (the uncle of the future Saint Cyril of Alexandria), the Tall Brothers fled to Constantinople, where they were received by Saint John Chrysostom, Archbishop of Constantinople, whose hospitality was later used to condemn and depose him at the Synod of the Oak in AD 403.

== Dioscorus ==
Dioscorus, one of the Tall Brothers, was appointed Bishop of Hermopolis (a city near Nitria) during the late 4th century and attended the Council of Constantinople in 394. However, he was later excommunicated due to his alleged Origenist sympathies. Dioscorus died in the early 5th century.
