= Kellia =

Place in Egypt

Coordinates: 30.776003°N 30.368868°E

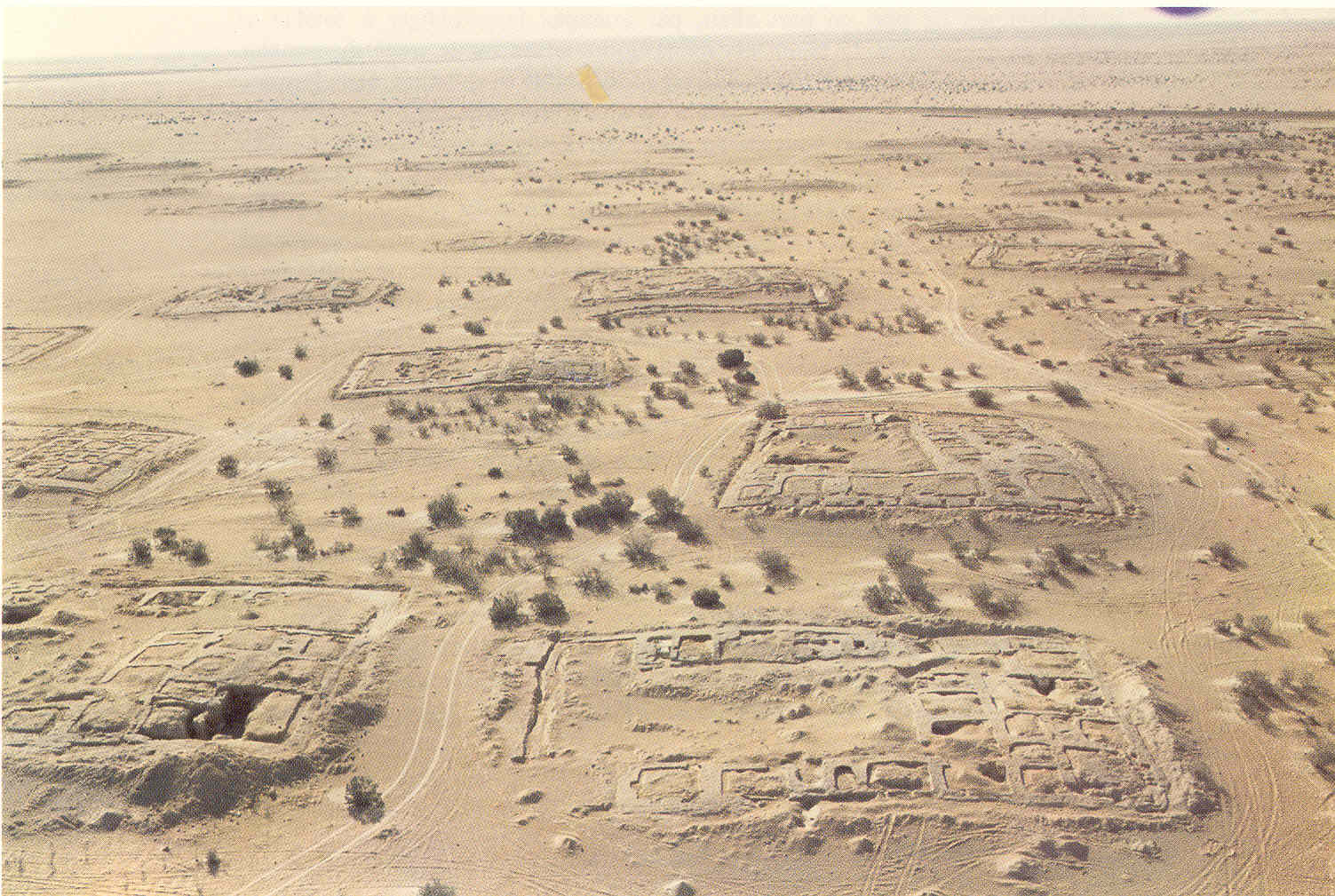
Kellia.

Kellia ("the Cells"), referred to as "the innermost desert", was a 4th-century Egyptian Christian monastic community spread out over many square kilometers in the Nitrian Desert about 65 km (40 mi) south of Alexandria. It was one of three centers of monastic activity in the region, along with Nitria and Scetis (Wadi El Natrun). It is called al-Muna in Arabic and was inhabited until the 9th century. Only archaeological sites remain there today.

== History ==
Founded in 338 C.E. by Saint Amun, under the spiritual guidance of Saint Anthony, it was designed for those who wished to enter the cenobitic life in a semi-anchoritic monastery. An account of its founding, perhaps legendary, is in the Apophthegmata Patrum. Amun, who was then a monk at Nitria, one day talked with Anthony saying that he and some brothers wanted to move away "that they may live in peace". Nitrea had become too successful and they wished for the solitude of the early days. Anthony and Amun ate dinner then walked into the desert until sunset, prayed and planted a cross to mark the site of the new community. The distance was 19 km (12 mi), or what Anthony considered close enough to reach in an after-dinner stroll.

Kellia was for advanced monks, for those who "lived a more remote life, stripped down to bare rudiments," as was recorded in the Greek Historia Monachorum in Aegypto by Flavius Rufinus who personally saw it. The cells were arranged far enough apart that "no one can catch sight of another nor can a voice be heard". It was only for monks who had first mastered the art of desert living at Nitria. They came together on Saturday and Sunday to share a meal together, some journeying around 5 km (3.1 mi) from their cell to the church. "They met in Church and, glimpsing this way and that, see one another as the heaven-restored." If a monk failed to appear they would know he was sick or died and eventually someone (individually) would bring food or help or collect the remains.

It was believed in the 390s up to 600 monks were at Kellia. By the 5th and 6th centuries it numbered in the thousands. Activity began to taper off in the 7th and 8th centuries due to doctrinal disputes in Egypt, and raids from nomads out of the Libyan desert to the west. During the reign of the Coptic patriarch Alexander II (705–730), there were schismatic Barsanuphians and Gaianites at Kellia. They were converted to the Coptic church by Bishop John of Sa El Hagar. The site was abandoned in the 9th century.

== Archaeological discoveries ==
Kellia was discovered by archaeologist Antoine Guillaumont in 1964, and has been excavated for over 25 years by French and Swiss teams. The site covers 125 square kilometers, over which many small hills, or koms, were found. Once excavated they were found to contain many churches and living quarters, or cells named koms. Over 1,500 structures have been identified but it is probable there were many more. The structures range from single-cells for one person, to multiple cells for two or three people, to larger hermitages that included rooms for older monks, chapels and towers. In addition there were clusters of buildings that formed centers for communal services (Qasr Waheida), a complex of churches (Qasr Lsa 1), and a commercial center (Qasr al-lzeila). Buildings were made with a sandy mud brick and brick vaulted roofs. Most of the recovered artifacts are pottery, some of the walls are covered in inscriptions, graffiti and paintings.

== See also ==
- Pherme
- Pachomian monasteries
- Wadi El Natrun
