= Nitrian Desert =

Region in northwestern Egypt

Coordinates: 30.42°N 30.14°E

The Nitrian Desert is a desert region in northeastern Egypt, lying between Alexandria and Cairo west of the Nile Delta. It is known for its history of Christian monasticism.

There were three monastic centres in the Nitrian Desert in Late Antiquity. Around 330, Macarius the Egyptian established a monastic colony in the Wadi El Natrun (Scetis), far from cultivable land. In the 330s, Saint Amun founded Nitria, only 30 miles (48 km) southeast of Alexandria, using the rules of Saint Anthony. He founded a second centre, Kellia, on Anthony's suggestion, deeper into the desert. Kellia has been the object of scientific excavations. Only Scetis in the Wadi El Natrun remains a monastic site today.

== See also ==
- Desert Fathers
- Or of Nitria
- Desert of Mount Athos
- Pachomian monasteries
