= Theophilus I of Alexandria =

Head of the Coptic Church from 384 to 412

Saint Theophilus of Alexandria
- Pope of Alexandria and Patriarch of the See of Saint Mark
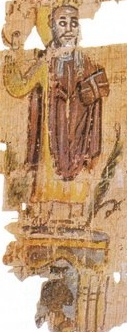
- Artistic depiction of Theophilus at the Serapeum, from the Alexandrian World Chronicle
- Papacy began: 384
- Papacy ended: 15 October 412
- Predecessor: Timothy I
- Successor: Cyril of Alexandria

Personal details
- Born: in the mid-4th century Likely Egypt
- Died: 15 October 412
- Buried: Dominicium, Alexandria
- Denomination: Church of Alexandria
- Residence: Saint Mark's Church

Sainthood
- Feast day: 18 Paopi (Coptic calendar); 15 October (Julian calendar); Currently 28 October (Gregorian calendar)
- Venerated in: Coptic Orthodox Church; Syriac Orthodox Church; Eastern Orthodox Church

Theophilus of Alexandria (Greek: Θεόφιλος; died 15 October 412) was the 23rd Pope of Alexandria and Patriarch of the See of Saint Mark from 385 to 412. He is remembered as a pivotal figure in late antique Christianity, known for his assertive role in suppressing paganism and managing ecclesiastical disputes that shaped the doctrinal course of the early Church.

== Historical context ==
Theophilus rose to the patriarchate during a time of significant transformation in the Roman Empire. Christianity had recently gained imperial support through the policies of Constantine and Theodosius I, displacing long-dominant pagan cults. Alexandria, a center of learning and philosophical traditions, became a focal point of religious and political tensions.

== Early life and patriarchate ==
Little is known about Theophilus’s early life, though he was likely born in Egypt in the mid-4th century. He succeeded Pope Timothy I as Patriarch of Alexandria in 385 AD. His nephew, Cyril of Alexandria, whom he mentored, later succeeded him in the same office.

== Suppression of paganism ==
In 391 AD, following a series of imperial edicts issued by Emperor Theodosius I that banned pagan worship and closed temples across the empire, Patriarch Theophilus I of Alexandria led efforts to repurpose or dismantle pagan religious structures in Alexandria. According to the church historian Socrates Scholasticus, Theophilus publicly mocked pagan artifacts, an act that provoked violent clashes between pagan and Christian factions in the city.

One of the most significant events during this period was the destruction of the Serapeum of Alexandria, one of the most prominent temples in the ancient city. While Christian sources described the incident as a victorious moment in the struggle against idolatry, modern scholars note that the event reflected broader political, religious, and social tensions in late Roman Alexandria. Some argue that the temple's destruction was part of a wider campaign to consolidate Christian authority and imperial control.

== The Origenist controversy ==
Though Theophilus initially supported the allegorical theology of Origen, he changed his position in 399 AD, aligning instead with “Anthropomorphite” monks who interpreted divine imagery literally. At a synod in Alexandria, he condemned Origen's writings and expelled Origenist monks. This included the influential group known as the Four Tall Brothers, intellectuals who later sought refuge under John Chrysostom in Constantinople.

== Synod of the Oak and deposition of John Chrysostom ==
In 403, Theophilus presided over the Synod of the Oak in Constantinople, orchestrating the deposition of John Chrysostom, then Archbishop of Constantinople. Theophilus accused him of insubordination and heresy, partly due to Chrysostom's sheltering of the exiled Origenists.

== Writings and legacy ==
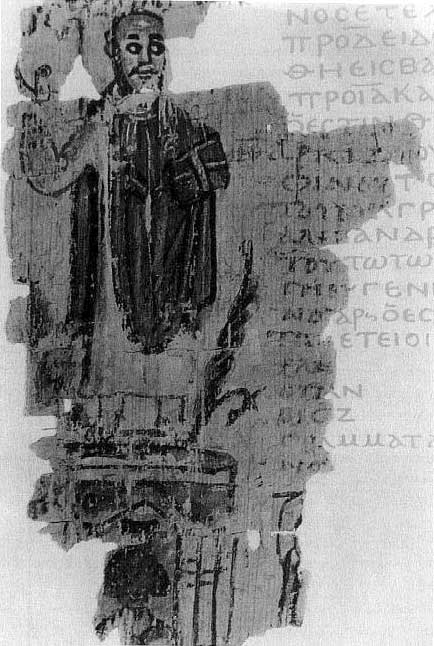
Illustration from a papyrus showing Pope Theophilus I of Alexandria

Theophilus was a prolific author, though most of his writings survive only in fragments or translations. His surviving corpus includes:

- Festal Letters – Issued annually to announce Easter and offer theological reflection.
- Paschal Table – Now lost, but known to have been dedicated to Emperor Theodosius I.
- Homilies – Including *Homily on the Crucifixion and the Good Thief*, preserved in Latin and Coptic/Geʽez versions.
- Correspondence – Letters exchanged with Jerome, Pope Anastasius I, and Pope Innocent I.
- Syriac Texts – Several homilies preserved in Syriac, published in modern editions by Fr. Zakka F. Labib.

Some of his prayers were translated into Geʽez, the liturgical language of the Ethiopian Orthodox Tewahedo Church, signifying his lasting influence beyond Egypt.

== Death and veneration ==
Theophilus died on 15 October 412 and was buried in Alexandria. He is venerated as a saint in the Coptic Orthodox Church, the Eastern Orthodox Church, and the Syriac Orthodox Church. His feast day is celebrated on 18 Paopi in the Coptic calendar, corresponding to 28 October on the Gregorian calendar.

== See also ==
- Cyril of Alexandria
- Serapeum of Alexandria
- Origenist crises
- Synod of the Oak

Titles of the Great Christian Church
Preceded by Timothy I	Pope and Patriarch of Alexandria; 385–412	Succeeded by Cyril
