= December 29 (Eastern Orthodox liturgics) =

Day in the Eastern Orthodox liturgical calendar

Eastern Orthodox liturgical calendar
December 28	December 29	December 30
December 29 O.S. ≍ January 11 N.S. December 29 N.S ≍ December 16 O.S.

The Massacre of the Innocents. (Dionysiou Monastery, 1547).

December 29 in Eastern Orthodox liturgical calendars is a feast day and a day of commemoration of saints and martyrs. Although some Orthodox churches use the Revised Julian Calendar and others use the traditional Julian calendar, the fixed commemorations for their respective December 29 are broadly the same, no matter which calendar is used. (Note: Despite the dates being the same, the days to which they refer typically differ by 13 days. The notation Old Style or O.S. is sometimes used to indicate a date in the traditional Julian Calendar (the "Old Calendar"). The notation New Style or N.S. indicates a date in the Revised Julian calendar (the "New Calendar").)

== Feasts ==
- Afterfeast of the Nativity of Christ

== Saints ==
- The 14,000 Infants (Holy Innocents) slain by Herod at Bethlehem, the first Christian martyrs
- Venerable Athenodorus the Leper, disciple of Saint Pachomius the Great (4th century) (Note: In Parisian Codex 1578, Athenodoros is accompanied by other Venerable fathers, including Benjamin and Babylas.)
- Venerable Benjamin, Monk of Nitria in Egypt (392) (Note: Saint Nicodemus states that he died of dropsy, and that the Evergetinos contains some of his quotations.)
- Venerable Marcellus, Abbot of the Monastery of the Unsleeping Ones ("the Ever-Vigilant"), (Note: (in Greek): Μονὴ Ἀκοιμήτων.) Constantinople (485)
- Venerable Thaddeus the Confessor of the Studion Monastery (818)
- Saint George, Metropolitan of Nicomedia, composer of Canons and Troparia (9th century) (Note: He composed two verses for the feast of the Presentation of the Theotokos, and set them to music for the Akolouthia (service). He also set to music the canon that is chanted for the forefeast of the Annunciation, as well as other canons of the Theotokos. In addition, he also composed other celebratory verses.)

== Pre-Schism Western saints ==
- Saint Trophimus, first Bishop of Arles in France (c. 280) (Note: "At Arles, the birthday of St. Trophimus, mentioned by St. Paul in his epistle to Timothy. Being consecrated bishop by that apostle, he was the first sent to preach the gospel of Christ in that city. From his preaching as from a fountain, according to the expression of Pope St. Zosimus, all Gaul received the waters of salvation.")
- Martyrs Callistus, Felix and Boniface, martyrs in Rome.
- Martyrs Dominic, Victor, Primian, Lybosus, Saturninus, Crescentius, Secundus and Honoratus, martyrs in North Africa.
- Saint Albert of Gambron, a courtier who became a hermit, later founding the small monastery of Gambron-sur-l'Authion in France (7th century)
- Saint Ebrulfus (Evroult), Abbot, born in Bayeux, became a monk at the monastery of Deux-Jumeaux, later founding a monastery at Pays d'Ouche in Normany, and other smaller monasteries (596) (Note: "In Normandy, St. Ebrulphus, abbot and confessor, in the time of king Childebert.")
- Saint Girald (Girard, Giraud), a monk at Lagny in France, later Abbot of Saint-Arnoul; he became Abbot of Fontenelle Abbey, where he was murdered (1031)

== Post-Schism Orthodox saints ==
- Venerable Mark the Grave-Digger of the Kiev Near Caves (11th century)
- Venerable Theophilus the Weeper and John (Ivan) of the Kiev Near Caves (11th–12th century)
- Venerable Theophilus (1412) and Jacob (James), Wonderworkers and Abbots of Luga and Omuch (Omutch), Pskov, disciples of Saint Arsenius of Konevets.
- Saint Job Knyaginitsky, founder of Manyava Skete, Ukraine (1621)
- Venerable Basilisk (Basiliscus) the Hesychast of Turinsk, Siberia (1824) (Note: He was canonized on January 11, 2004. His memory is also celebrated on the Synaxis of All Saints of Siberia, on June 10.)
- Venerable Lawrence (Laurence) of Chernigov (1950) (Note: He is commemorated on December 29/January 11 and January 6/19.) (Note: See: (in Russian) Лаврентий Черниговский. Википедии. (Russian Wikipedia).) (see also: January 6)
- Venerable Chrysostomos Papasarantopoulos, a pioneering missionary of Eastern Orthodox Christianity in Africa — in Uganda, Kenya, Tanzania and Congo (1972) (Note: Venerable Chrysostomos (Papasarantopoulos) was glorified by the Patriarchate of Alexandria on October 8, 2025, with a service in Greek to the saint.) (see also: March 22 - Uncovering of Relics)

=== New martyrs and confessors ===
- New Hieromartyr Vladimir Troepolsky, Priest, of Alupka, Crimea (1905)
- New Hieromartyr Theodosius Belenky, Priest, at Chimkent (1938)
- New Virgin-Martyrs:

- Natalia Sundukova, Natalia Siluyanova, Eudokia Guseva, Anna Popova, Matrona Navolokina, Barbara Derevyagina, Anna Borovskaya, Eudokia Nazina, Ephrosyne Denisova, Agrippina Kiseleva, and Natalia Vasilyeva, shot by the NKVD (1942)

== Other commemorations ==
- Commemoration of all Orthodox Christians who have died from hunger, thirst, the sword, and freezing.
- Commemoration of the Consecration of the Church of the Holy Forty Martyrs near the Bronze Tetrapylon (four-way arch).

== Icon gallery ==
The 14,000 Infants (Holy Innocents).
(Menologion of Basil II, 10th century).

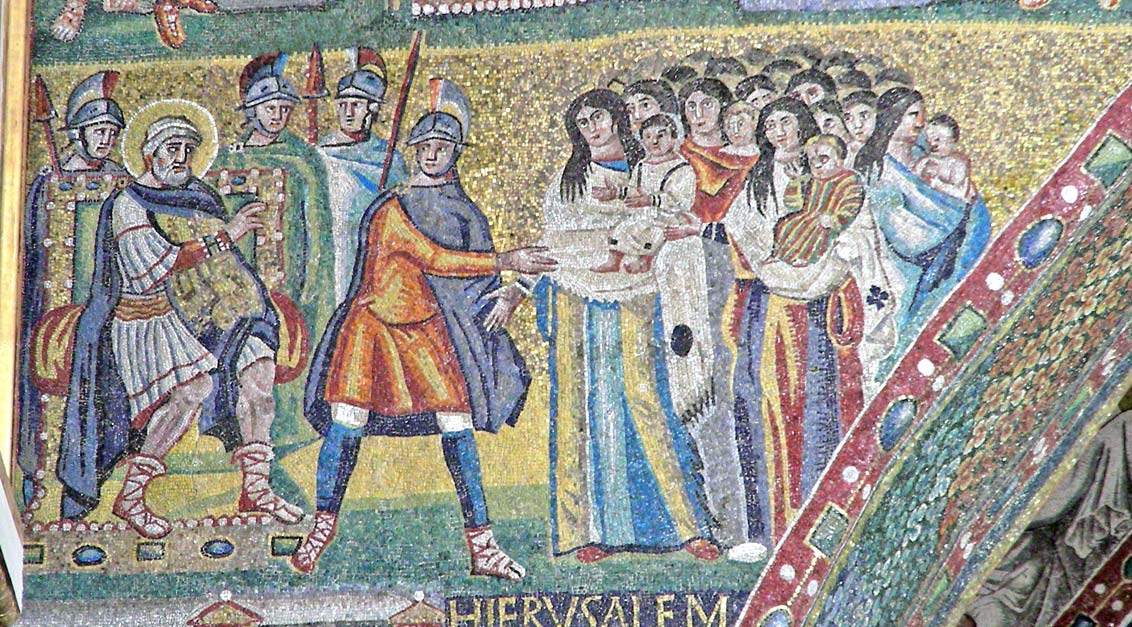
Order for the infanticide in the vicinity of Bethlehem.
(Mosaic in the Basilica of Santa Maria Maggiore, Rome).

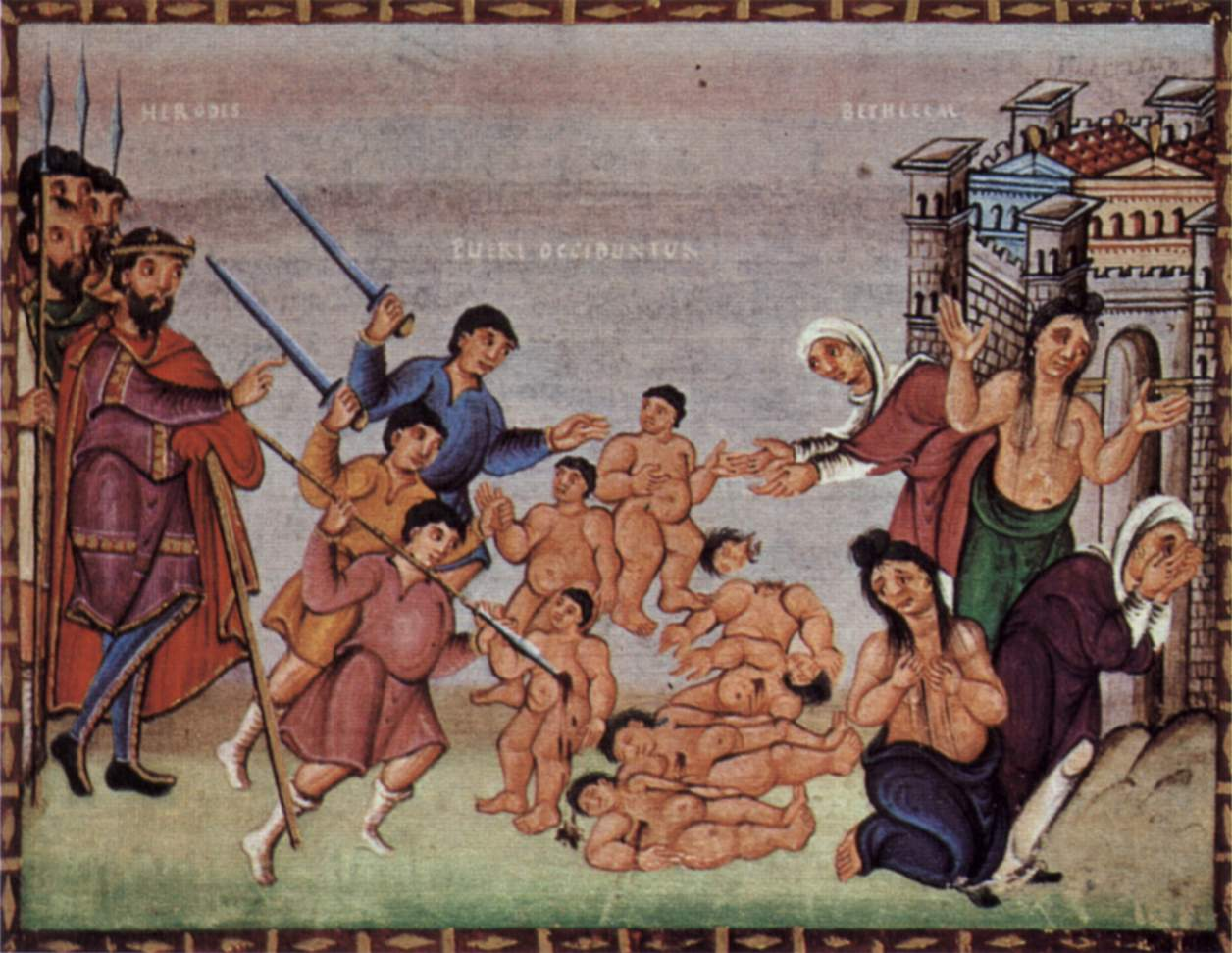
The 14,000 Infants (Holy Innocents).
(Codex Egberti, 10th century).

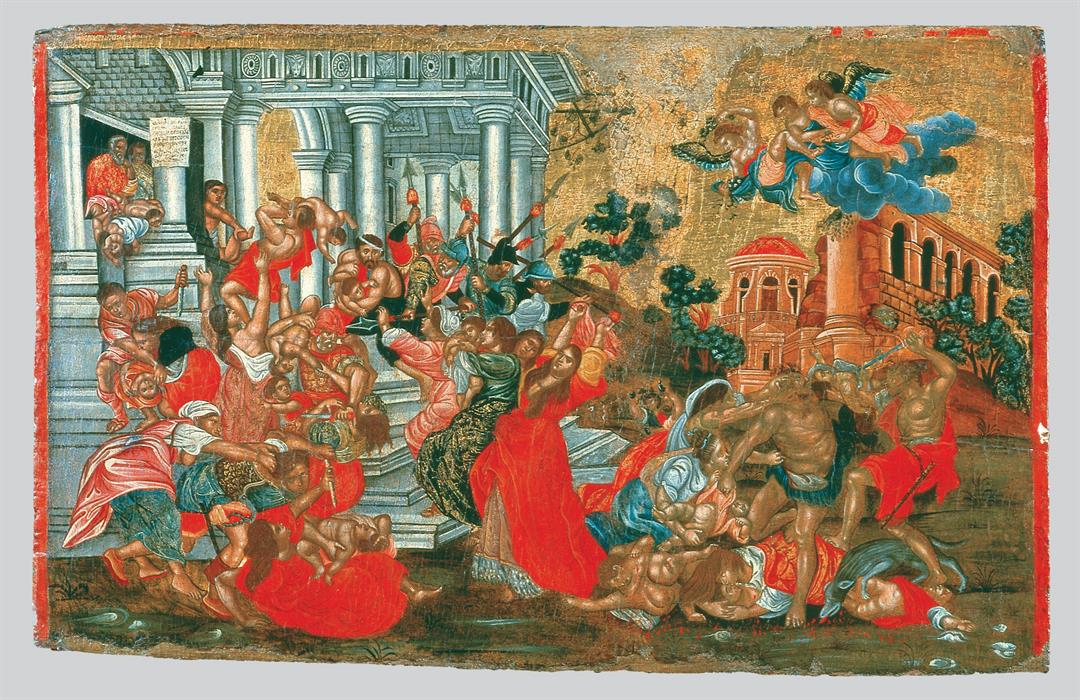
Massacre of the Innocents.
(Ionian, 17th century, Byzantine museum).

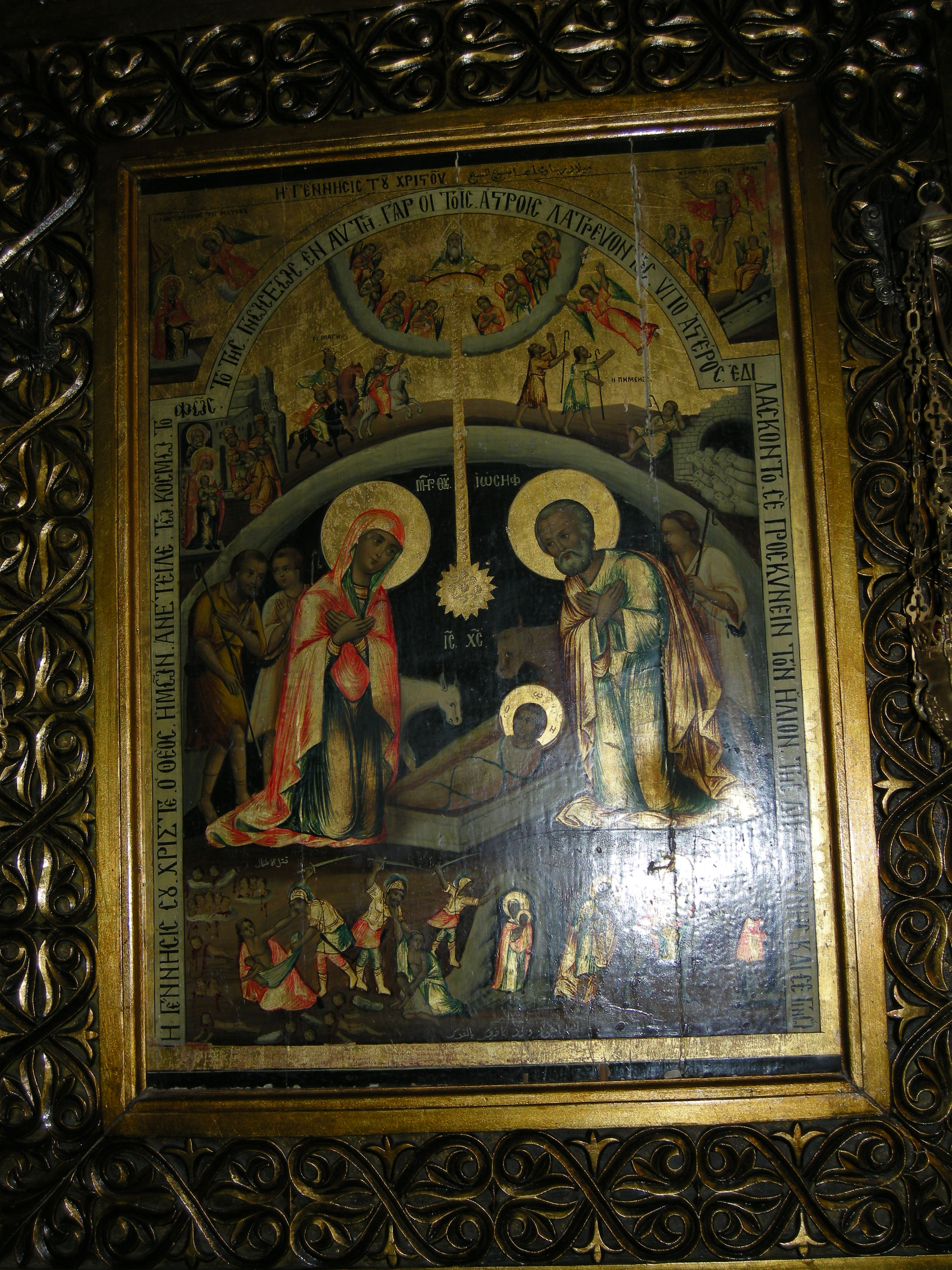
Massacre of the Innocents (bottom left).
(Annunciation Cathedral (Melkite), Jerusalem).

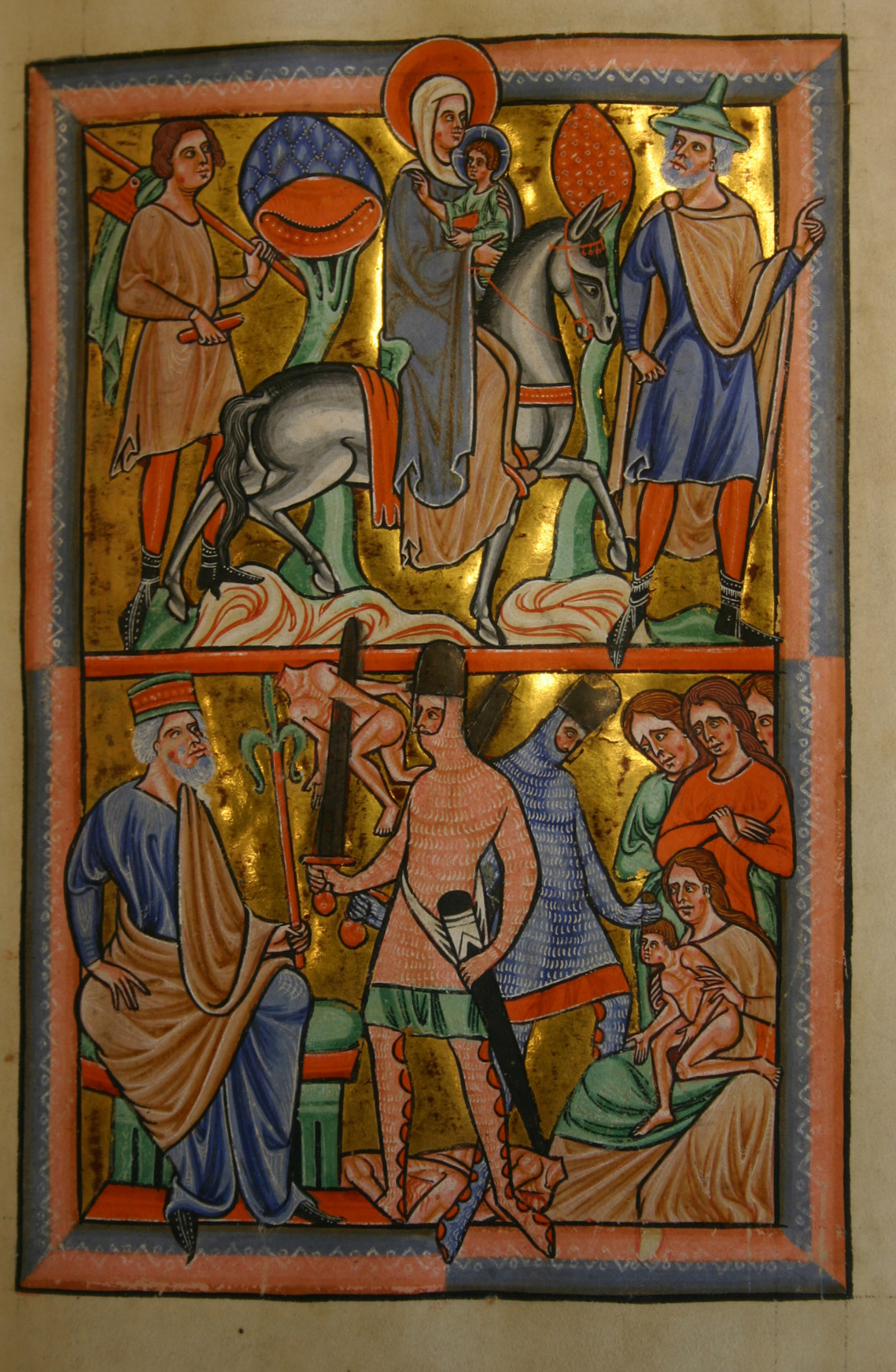
The 14,000 Infants (Holy Innocents)
(Saint Louis Psalter, 1190–1200).

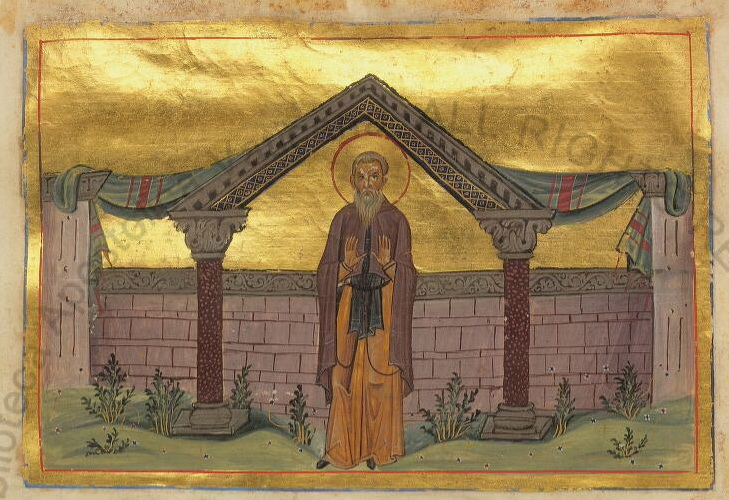
St. Marcellus, Abbot of the Monastery of the Unsleeping Ones ("the Ever-Vigilant").
(Menologion of Basil II, 10th century).

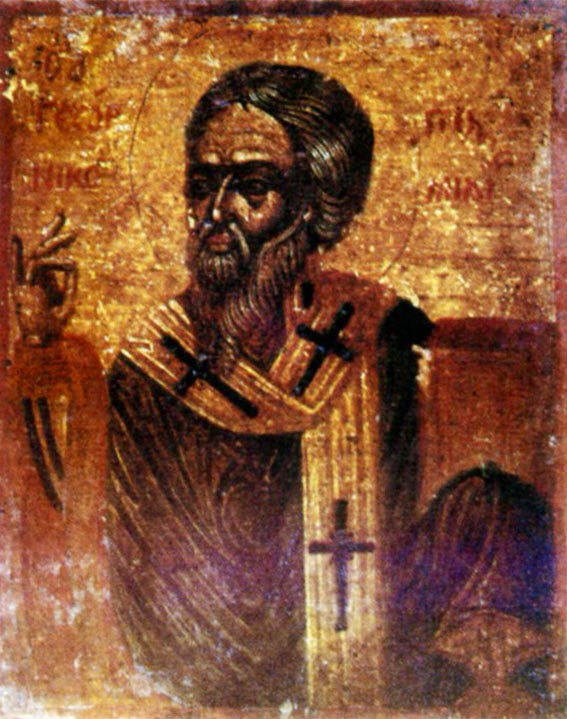
St. George, Metropolitan of Nicomedia.

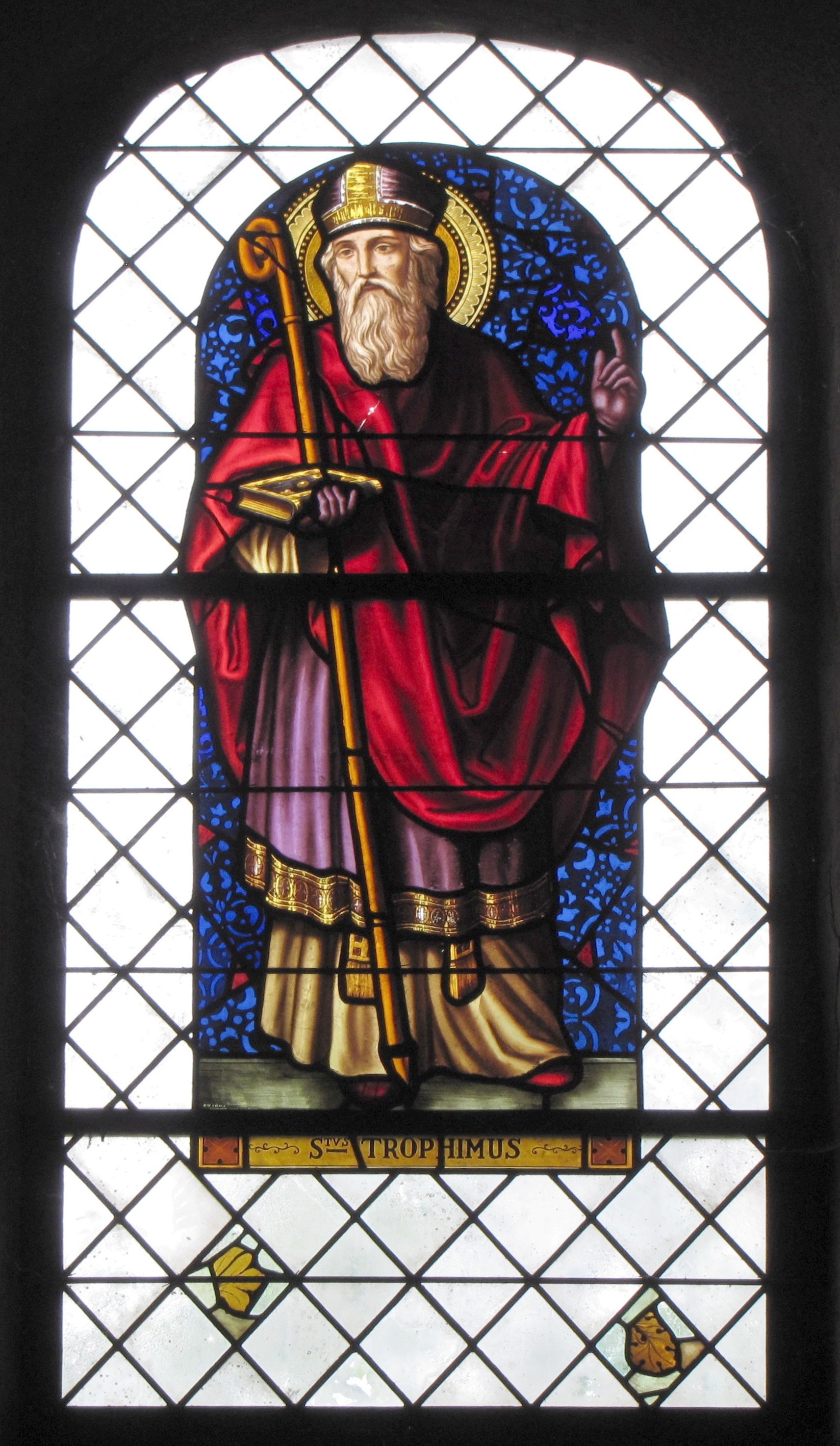
St. Trophimus of Arles, stained-glass window.

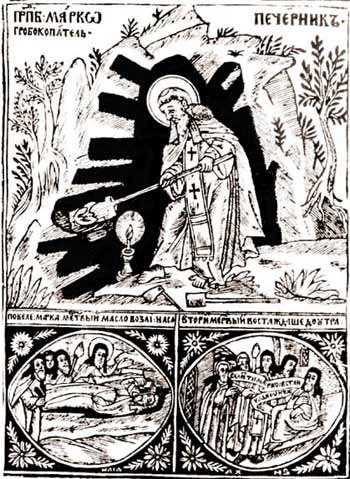
St. Mark the Grave-digger, of the Kiev Caves.

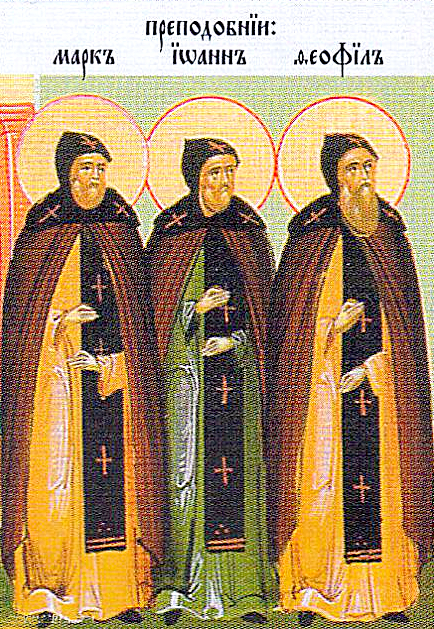
St. Mark the Gravedigger,
St. Theophilus the Weeper, and
St. John of the Kiev Near Caves.

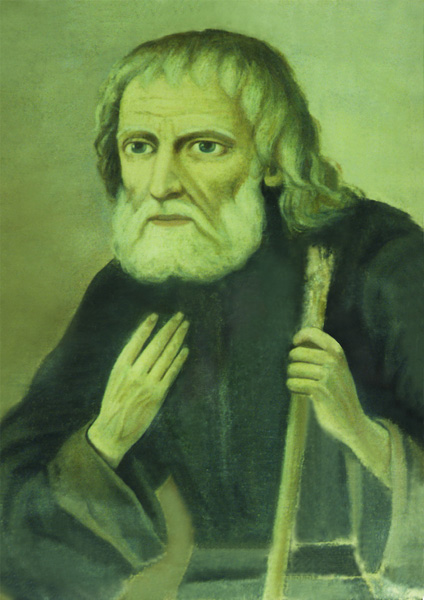
St. Basiliscus, Hesychast of Siberia.

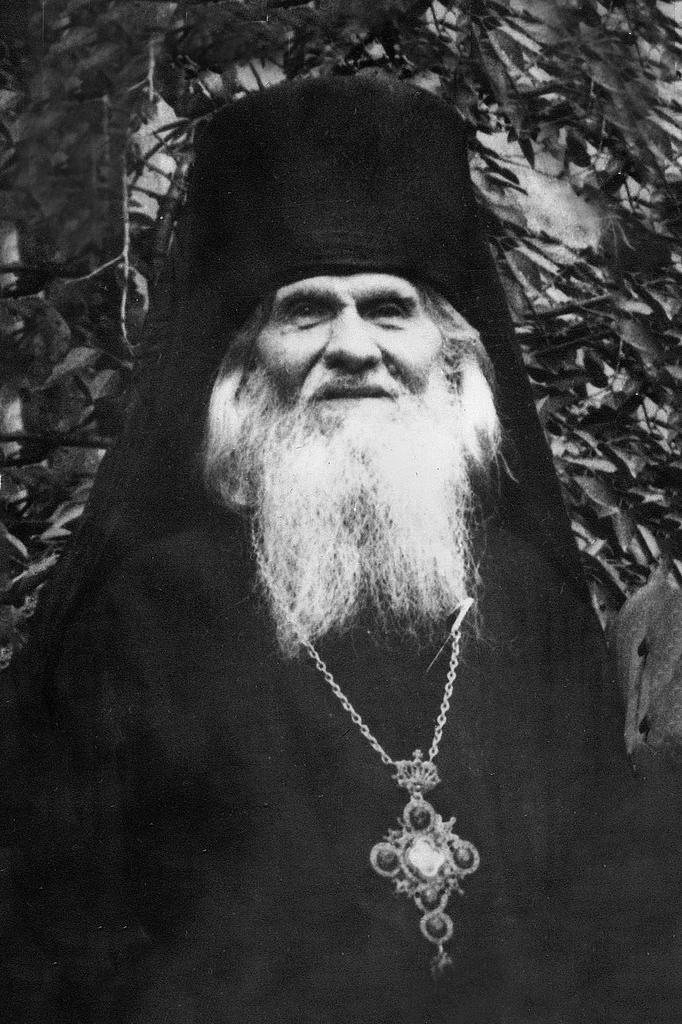
Venerable Laurence of Chernigov.

== Sources ==
- December 29/January 11. Orthodox Calendar (PRAVOSLAVIE.RU).
- January 11 / December 29. HOLY TRINITY RUSSIAN ORTHODOX CHURCH (A parish of the Patriarchate of Moscow).
- December 29. OCA - The Lives of the Saints.
- The Autonomous Orthodox Metropolia of Western Europe and the Americas (ROCOR). St. Hilarion Calendar of Saints for the year of our Lord 2004. St. Hilarion Press (Austin, TX). p. 3.
- December 29. Latin Saints of the Orthodox Patriarchate of Rome.
- The Roman Martyrology. Transl. by the Archbishop of Baltimore. Last Edition, According to the Copy Printed at Rome in 1914. Revised Edition, with the Imprimatur of His Eminence Cardinal Gibbons. Baltimore: John Murphy Company, 1916. pp. 400–401.

Greek Sources

- Great Synaxaristes: (in Greek) 29 ΔΕΚΕΜΒΡΙΟΥ. ΜΕΓΑΣ ΣΥΝΑΞΑΡΙΣΤΗΣ.
- (in Greek) Συναξαριστής. 29 Δεκεμβρίου. ECCLESIA.GR. (H ΕΚΚΛΗΣΙΑ ΤΗΣ ΕΛΛΑΔΟΣ).

Russian Sources

- (in Russian) 11 января (29 декабря). Православная Энциклопедия под редакцией Патриарха Московского и всея Руси Кирилла (электронная версия). (Orthodox Encyclopedia - Pravenc.ru).
- (in Russian) 29 декабря (ст.ст.) 11 января 2013 (нов. ст.). Русская Православная Церковь Отдел внешних церковных связей. (DECR).
