= Kyiv Caves Patericon =

Collection of tales about the monks of the Kyiv Monastery of the Caves

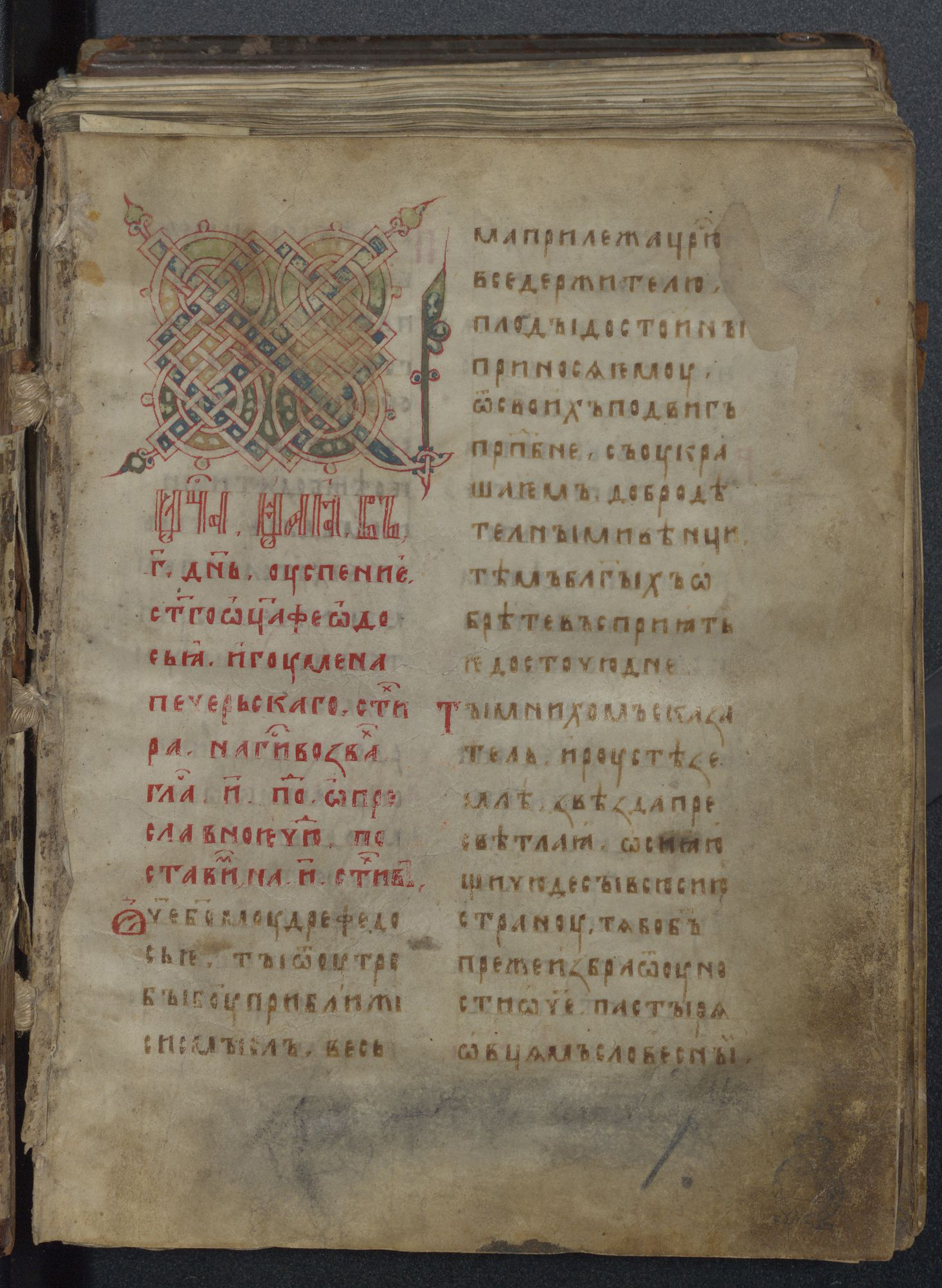
First page of a 1406 manuscript from the collection of the Russian National Library

The Kyiv Caves Patericon or the Kyiv-Pechersk Patericon (Ukrainian: Києво-Печерський патерик), full title: Patericon, or the Life of Saint Fathers of Kyiv Caves, is a monument of Old Russian and Old Ukrainian literature, a collection of tales about the monks of the Kyiv Monastery of the Caves, later Lavra. The patericon is considered one of the most original works of Old East Slavic hagiography; it contains little recycling of previous writings and introduces much new material. Its basis consists of texts written by bishop Simon of Suzdal and Vladimir, and the monk Polycarp of Pechersk of the Kyiv Monastery of the Caves, supplemented over the centuries with additional biographies of the monks.

== Circumstances of creation ==
The Patericon has been preserved in about 200 manuscripts from the 15th to 17th century. The core text traces back to the correspondence between Simon and Polycarp of the early 13th century, which was subsequently expanded upon by later authors and editors.

=== Correspondence between Bishop Simon and monk Polycarp ===
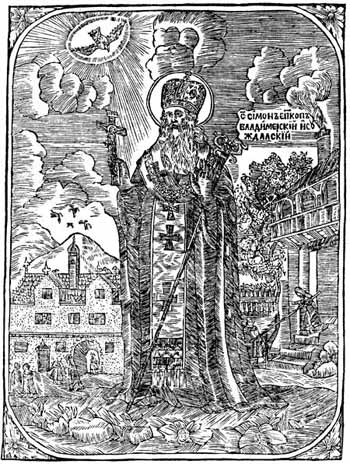
Saint Simon, bishop of Vladimir and Suzdal. Gravure from the 16th century

The contemporary-known Kyiv Caves Patericon emerged through the re-editing of the correspondence exchanged in the 1220s between the monk Polycarp and the Bishop of Vladimir and Suzdal, Simon. Despite clearly indicated senders and recipients, most of the correspondence took the form of open letters. Simon treated the written letters not only as a form of spiritual and theological education for Polycarp but also as a means of promoting knowledge about the Kyiv Monastery (where he had once been a monk) and his ideas related to the clergy. This was related to the loss of Kyiv's original significance as an administrative and ecclesiastical center. The description of the lives of selected monks from the Kyiv Monastery of the Caves was meant to preserve their fate from oblivion and remind of the former glory of the monastery.

The oldest surviving part of the exchange of letters between Simon and Polycarp to our times is a passage known as Simon's Epistle, in which the bishop rebukes his spiritual disciple for excessive desire for power, manifested in his eager pursuit of ecclesiastical dignities without the permission of the hegumen of the Kyiv monastery. Simon presents Polycarp with nine biographies of monks from this monastery, recognized as saints, to convince him that the mere fact of belonging to such a distinguished monastery should be a cause for happiness for him. He complements them with several legends about the unknown beginnings of the monastery. In his text, he uses information known to him from his own experience, from the stories of other monks, but also from chronicles and named lists of the deceased. Among the literary sources used by Bishop Simon are:

- the Life of Theodosius of the Caves;
- the Rostov Chronicle;
- the monastery synod;
- the Life of Anthony of Caves, or An account of why the Caves Monastery is so called (the authenticity of which is doubtful);

and a number of translated monuments:

- "The Parenesis by Ephraim the Syrian;
- The Ladder by John the Ladder-maker;
- the Skete Paterikon; and
- the Prologue.

Polycarp, in turn, undertook the creation of further biographies of monks. The Epistle, which follows Simon's text, contains 11 more stories written by him on this subject. Polycarp dedicated his work to the hegumen of the monastery, Akindyn. Unlike Simon, Polycarp does not present his text in the form of a letter but openly states that the purpose of his writing about the monks is to preserve the memory of the miracles and signs attributed to them.

=== Development of the Kyiv Caves Patericon between the 13th and 15th centuries ===
The statements contained in the correspondence between Simon and Polycarp indicate that both authors aimed to create a collection of stories about the revered monks of the Kyiv Monastery of the Caves. However, even after their death, the text created in this way continued to be developed and modified. Monks from the Kyiv Monastery added stories that emerged later, while other passages were shortened or removed. The goal of this work was to present the entirety of the monastery's history in the Patericon. Ludmiła Nodzyńska believes that it is not possible to determine unequivocally at which point in the development of the text it received the name by which it is known today. Tadeusz Kołakowski, on the other hand, argues that this title appeared in 1462, in the so-called second Cassian edition. The 1406 Arsenian Redaction is the oldest to survive; there is no documentary evidence of an earlier collection, and all assertions of such a collection are hypothetical.

=== Editorials of the Kyiv Caves Patericon created in the 15th century ===
At the beginning of the 15th century, at the behest of Bishop Arsenius of Tver (formerly living in the Kyiv Monastery of the Caves), a new edition of the Patericon was compiled, known as the Arsenian Redaction (1406). This text, although linguistically retaining the characteristics of the original, for reasons unknown, makes cuts in the text, removing both the Epistles and fragments of narratives (including the entire section dedicated to Alimpius). However, it retains some works authored by the monk Nestor the Chronicler, unrelated to the original Patericon.

In the years 1460 and 1462, the monk Cassian of the Kyiv Monastery of the Caves prepared two more editions, the second of which was a significant expansion of the first (referred to as the First and Second Cassian redaction). Cassian adapted the language of the texts to his contemporary readers. Serious differences between the two texts lead some researchers to conclude that Cassian was only a co-author of the first version, as evidenced by his listing together with the contents of the first edition under another monk named John. The second Cassian edition served as the most frequently repeated basis for printed editions (the first in 1661 in Kyiv). Compared to the original wording of the Patericon, the second Cassian edition makes significant changes in style and vocabulary: it removes numerous Ruthenian words in favor of Church Slavonic ones, makes the language of the text more solemn, and adds many quotations from the Bible.

One other redaction is known from the 15th century, the Theodosian redaction, represented by a single manuscript.

=== Trizna edition and Polish print Paterykon ===
The Josif Trizna redaction of the early 17th century is considered highly corrupted. It was "overloaded with far too much additional material, to the extent that the basic form of the work was distorted." The Lives composed by later editors are seen as "worthless, since they do not even assemble the main facts correctly." Yet this Josif Trizna redaction was the basis of the 1635 Polish print edition, which would remain the only published version in circulation until 1872.

In 1635, the first translation of the Patericon into Polish was published by Bishop Sylvester Kosiv of Mogilev, titled Paterykon, albo żywoty ss. Ojców Pieczerskich. Kosiv translated the Patericon with the intention of using it as an argument in discussions between Orthodox and Uniate Christians, especially to demonstrate the complete distinctiveness of the Orthodox tradition from Rome. In preparing the text, he accompanied it with extensive commentary, referring to Rus' and Polish chronicles and explaining inconsistencies in the work concerning historical events. Kosiv dedicated his translation to Adam Kisiel.

The Kosiv edition, developed based on the second Cassian redaction, modifies the language and style of the original in a similar spirit – softening overly harsh formulations, elevating vocabulary and style, and employing complex rhetorical figures. The known works of Piotr Skarga influenced the shape of Kosiv's translation. Despite these significant departures from the original wording of the Patericon, Kosiv's translation became its most popular version in the 17th and 18th centuries, as well as the basis for subsequent translations into Ukrainian and Russian.

Further editions of the Patericon consisted of repetitions of the texts contained in earlier editions. In scholarly works produced in the 20th century, only the original text is used.

== Contents ==
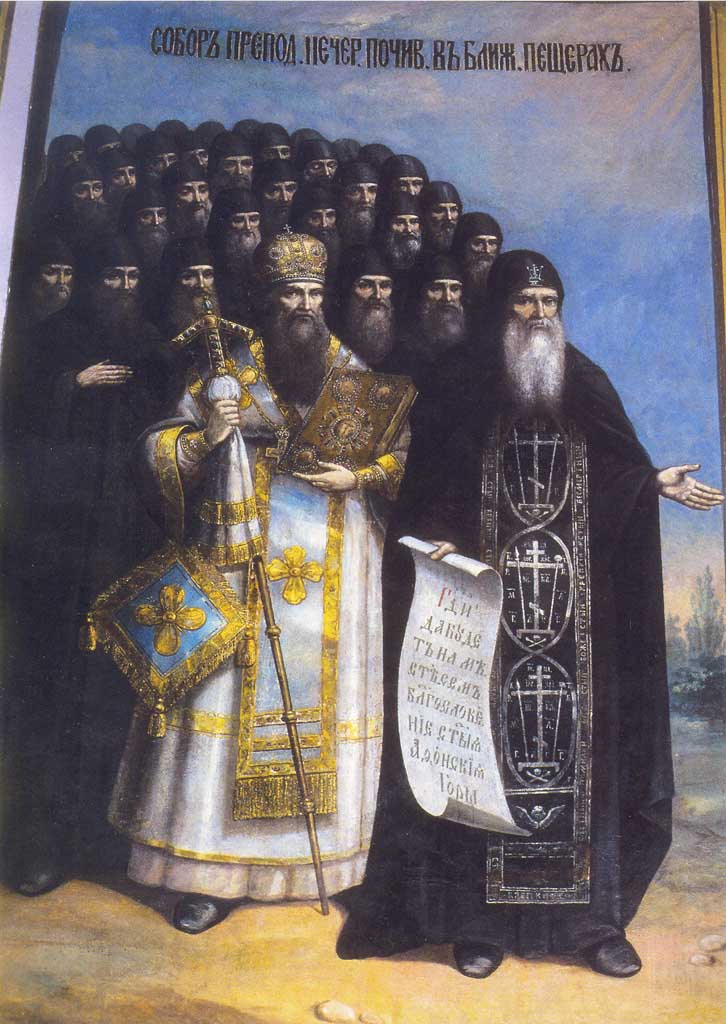
Fresco depicting the council of the Caves Fathers resting in Closer Caves. Some of the monks depicted on it are heroes of the stories contained in the Kyiv Caves Patericon

The Kyiv Caves Patericon, as understood in scholarly literature, i.e., the text compiled by Simon and Polycarp without later modifications, contained the following discourses (slova, "words") according to the standard Second Cassian redaction numbering:

=== Legends about the establishment of the Kyiv Monastery of the Caves ===
Discourses 1–6 were written by Simon; they describe the foundation, building, decoration, and consecration of the Lavra's Dormition Church of the Theotokos (begun in 1073, consecrated in 1089).

- (1) Concerning the building of the church (Note: Full title: The Caves Patericon, which recounts the construction of the church, so that everyone would understand that it arose and was accomplished by the intention and will of the Lord Himself, and by the prayer and desire of His Most Pure Mother, it emerged as a fitting temple to God, resembling the heavens, the great church of the Pechersk Lavra of the Holy Mother of God, the archimandrite of all the Rus' land, which is the lavra of our holy and great father Theodosius.);
- (2) The word about the arrival of church masters from Constantinople to Anthony and Theodosius, or Arrival of the craftsmen from Constantinople;
- (3) The word about the founding of the Caves church;
- (4) The word about the arrival of church painters from Constantinople to Hegumen Nikon, or The coming of the church-painters;
- (5) About John and Sergius, an extraordinary miracle before the miraculous icon of the Mother of God in the Divine Caves Church, or A miracle concerning Ioann and Sergij;
- (6) The tale of the holy altar and the consecration of this Great Church of the Mother of God, or The holy table and the consecration of the great Church;
- (7) An account of why the Caves Monastery is so called, or The Life of Antony of the Caves;
- (8) The Life of our venerable father Theodosius (Feodosij); written by Nestor the Hagiographer;
- (9) The translation of the relics of Theodosius;
- (10) The decoration of Theodosius’s coffin;
- (11) An encomium to our venerable father Theodosius;
- (12) The first monks of the Caves Monastery;
- (36) Venerable Isaakij the Cave-dweller; anonymous, inexplicably separated from Discourse 12 in which four contemporary monks of Isaakij were narrated;
- (13) How Nifont saw Theodosius in a divine revelation.

=== Stories about monks edited by Simon ===
Discourses 14–23 were written by Simon.

- (14) The humble Bishop of Vladimir and Suzdal, Simon's epistle to Polycarp, the Caves monk; not present in the 1406 Arsenian Redaction
- (15) Simon, Bishop of Vladimir and Suzdal's tale of the holy Caves monks. Why one should have devotion and love for the blessed Anthony and Theodosius, the fathers of the caves;
- (16) About the blessed Eustratius the Fastidious;
- (17) About the humble and greatly patient Nikon the monk;
- (18) About the holy martyr Kuksha and Pimen the Fastidious;
- (19) About the holy Athanasius the Recluse, who died and rose again the next day and lived for 12 years;
- (20) About the blessed Nikolai Svatosha, the prince of Chernihiv;
- (21) About Erazm the monk, who lost his property on holy icons and gained salvation through them;
- (22) About Arefa the monk, whose stolen property was counted as alms by thieves, and thereby he was saved;
- (23) About two brothers, Titus the priest and Evagrius the deacon, who quarreled with each other.

=== Stories about monks edited by Polycarp ===
Discourses 24–35 were written by Polycarp.

- (24) The second epistle to our Caves archimandrite Akindyn concerning the holy and blessed Caves monks, our brothers, written by Polycarp, a monk of the same Caves monastery; not present in the 1406 Arsenian Redaction
- (25) About Nikita the Recluse, who later became a bishop in Novgorod;
- (26) About Lawrence the Recluse;
- (27) About the holy and blessed Agapetus, the physician who refused payment; the 1406 Arsenian Redaction has a much shorter ending
- (28) About St. Gregory the Miracle-Worker;
- (29) About the greatly patient John the Recluse;
- (30) About the venerable Moses the Hungarian;
- (31) About Prochorus the monk, who made bread from a plant called "lebioda" through prayer, and salt from ashes;
- (32) About the venerable Mark of the Caves, whose commandments were obeyed even by the dead;
- (33) The word about the holy venerable fathers Theodore and Basil;
- (34) About the holy Spirydon the Prosphora-Baker and Alimp the Icon-Painter; not present in the 1406 Arsenian Redaction
- (35) About the holy sufferer Father Pimen and those who desire monasticism before death.

=== Later additions ===
- Second Cassian redaction of 1462:
  - Discourse 37: An Inquiry by the pious prince Izjaslav concerning the Latins, a polemic against the Latins.
  - Discourse 38: the 1182 election of priest Vasily.

== Characteristics ==
=== Style of the text ===
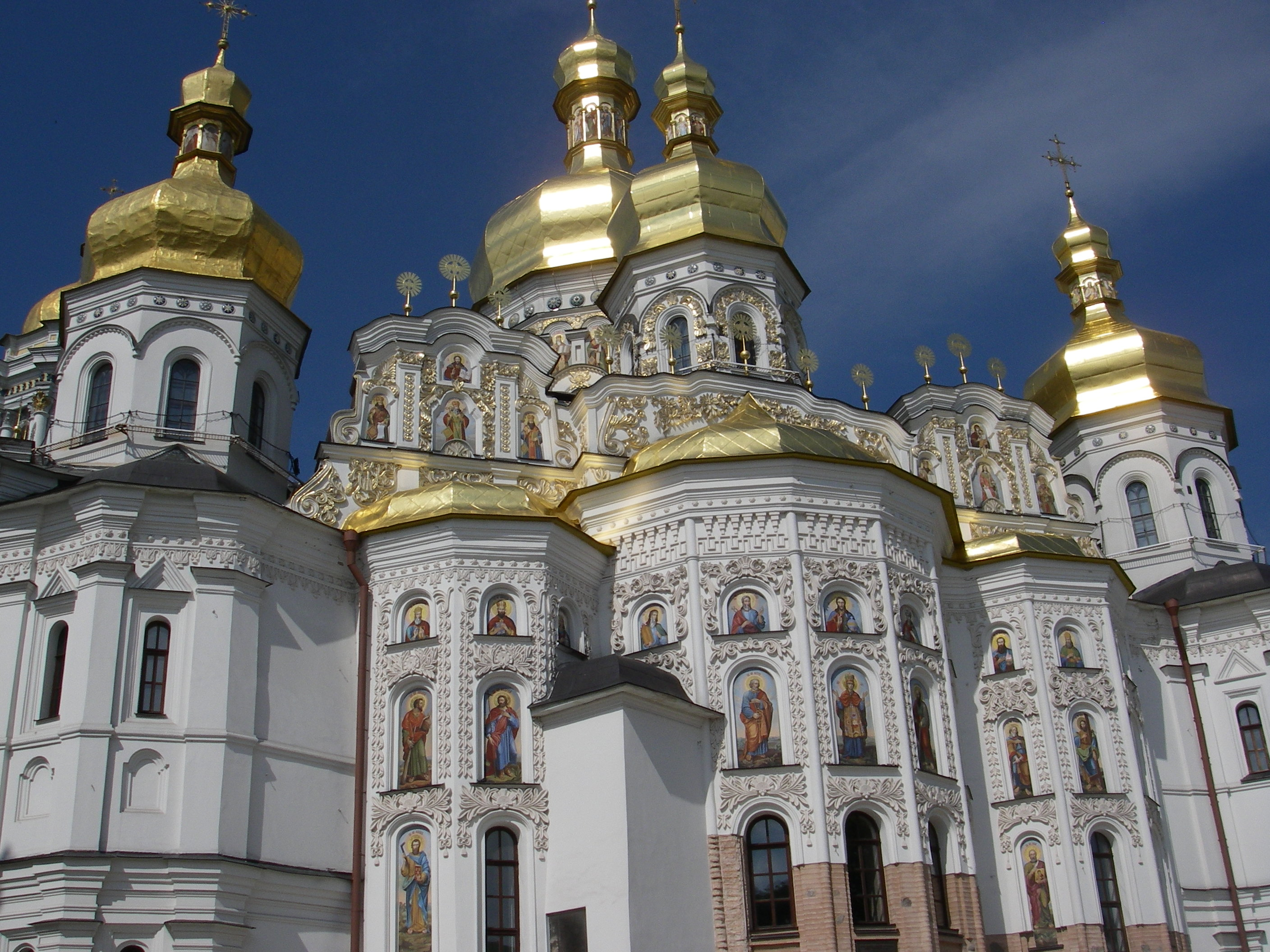
Dormition Cathedral at the Kyiv Pechersk Lavra

The individual parts of the Patericon clearly differ stylistically. The texts written by Simon indicate erudition in patristic literature and a striving for an elegant, lofty style. However, this style diminishes when the author mentions events known to him from personal experience or from the accounts of other monks – they are written in a much simpler manner. Fragments edited by Polycarp are characterized by greater caution in the selection of quotations, which the author seeks to present by referring to credible sources. Due to his presence in Kyiv at the time of writing, Polycarp had wider access to monastery archives than Simon and more faithfully reflected the contemporary realities of monastic life. His stories about the monks approach the conventions of folk tales, which leads some researchers to directly derive them from the tradition of oral transmission.

=== Characteristics of the stories ===
The tales of the monks of the Kyiv Monastery of the Caves combine the characteristics of chronicle accounts, orally transmitted folk tales, hagiographic texts (the ubiquitous presence of supernatural beings, numerous visions, and miracles), or even folk tales (characteristic devilish figures in Polycarp's stories). A clear source of inspiration is the Holy Scripture, which manifests not only in the abundance of direct quotations but also in plot references (similarities between episodes from the lives of the monks and events from the lives of Old Testament prophets and leaders). Many motifs of miracles described in the work appear in almost unchanged form in other saints' legends originating in Rus and later. However, elements constituting the replication of the hagiographic scheme are intertwined with detailed depictions of monastic life and, to a lesser extent, the society of Rus, making the Patericon a unique work in its genre.

The stories also address broader issues. Through examples from the lives of individual monks, the Kyiv Caves Patericon formulates a message regarding the relationship between the monastic community and secular authority; not hiding that disputes occurred between them, it unequivocally supports the monks. The stories about the individual monks are quite schematic. By repeating well-known hagiographic patterns, they focus on emphasizing the extraordinary piety of the monks through descriptions of the ascetic traditions they practiced, followed by the miracles they performed.

== Meaning ==
In the history of literature, the Kyiv Caves Patericon is an example of the process of transferring earlier Eastern Christian traditions to the Rus' context, in this case, a specific genre of hagiographic literature. The Patericon was also a highly popular work in the Rus' lands, highly regarded by later Ukrainian and Russian literati.

Ludmiła Nodzyńska describes the Kyiv Caves Patericon as one of the three fundamental historical sources for the study of the Christianization of Rus', alongside the Primary Chronicle and the Life of Theodosius of the Caves. However, she emphasizes that the nature of all three texts, combining hagiography with an account of known facts to the author, requires their specific treatment. The facts cited in the Patericon must be confronted with other source materials and located in the broader context of the tradition of the Caves Monastery. The most valuable are the depictions of monastery life presented in the text, which – while maintaining the hagiographic poetics – provide a credible picture of the formation of the Kyiv monastic tradition as an adaptation of the life rules developed by Theodore the Studite to the Rus' context.

== Bibliography ==
- Barański, Z.; Semczuk, A., eds. (1975). Literatura rosyjska w zarysie (in Polish). Vol. I. Warsaw: Państwowe Wydawnictwo Naukowe. ISBN 83-01-06758-6.
- Heppell, Muriel, ed. (1989). The Paterik of the Kievan Caves Monastery (PDF). Cambridge, Massachusetts: Harvard Ukrainian Research Institute. p. 262. ISBN 0-916458-27-X.
- Łużny, Ryszard, ed. (1988). "Opowieści z Pateryku Kijowsko-Pieczerskiego". Opowieść o niewidzialnym grodzie Kitieżu. Z legend i podań dawnej Rusi (in Polish). Warsaw: Pax. ISBN 83-211-0721-4.
- Nodzyńska, L. (1993). "Opracowanie". Pateryk Kijowsko-Pieczerski, czyli opowieści o świętych ojcach w pieczarach kijowskich położonych (in Polish). Wrocław: Wydawnictwo Uniwersytetu Wrocławskiego. ISBN 83-229-0736-2.
- Nodzyńska, L. (1998). "Pateryk Kijowsko-Pieczerski o chrystianizacji Rusi". In Łużny, Ryszard (ed.). Dzieło chrystianizacji Rusi Kijowskiej i jego konsekwencje w kulturze Europy (in Polish). Lublin: Redakcja Wydawnictw Katolickiego Uniwersytetu Lubelskiego. ISBN 83-228-0147-5.
- Tolochko, Oleksiy (2013). "Патерик Киево-Печерский". Електронна бібліотека (in Ukrainian).
- Woźniak, M. (1970). Istorija ukrainśkoji literatury. Mouton: Hague.
