= Ammonas of Egypt =

Christian monk and saint of Egypt

Amtnonas, Ammonius, Ammonios, Ammon of Nitria
- Born: c. late third or early fourth century Egypt
- Died: c. early fifth century Egypt
- Honored in: Eastern Orthodox Church
- Feast: 10 January
- Influences: Saint Anthony the Great
- Major works: The Letters of Bishop Ammonas

Ammonas of Egypt (also Amtnonas, Ammon, Ammonius, Greek: Αμμωνάς) was an eastern Christian anchorite, monastic, and Desert Father who was born around the early 4th century. He is a saint in the Eastern Orthodox Church. Ammonas was a disciple of Anthony the Great and Pambo. Many of his known sayings and quotations exist in eleven sections of the Sayings of the Desert Fathers.

Ammonas is commemorated as "Ammon" on January 10th in The Prologue of Ohrid, a synaxarium written by Saint Nikolaj Velimirović. It mentions his 14-year struggle in Scetis against anger.

== Life ==
=== Monastic life ===
Ammonas moved into the Egyptian desert with his three brothers and two sisters so that they could draw nearer to God. At some point during his life, probably during this time, he spent 14 years in Scetis. He was a trusted disciple of Anthony the Great and became his successor at the monastery on the Outer Mountain of Pispir (Egypt, east of the Nile river) after Anthony relocated in AD 305 (see Dayr al-Maymūn).

=== As a bishop ===
Timothy, the Bishop of Alexandria at the time, heard of Ammonas and desired to ordain him. Initially, he did not want to become a bishop even purportedly mutilated his body so that he could escape ordination.

The historical record contains conflicting facts about Ammonas' ordination. In the Episcopal Church Ammonas is regarded as a hermit for life, who not only resisted ordination but ultimately never was ordained.

Nevertheless, Ammonas was eventually ordained a Christian bishop, and at least two third or fourth-century epistles are attributed to him, translated in Syriac (regarded as the most reputable), Latin, and Greek. They exist among the letters and exhortations of Anthony. There were other epistles written by a certain Ammonas, but which scholars are unable to attribute with certainty to Ammonas of Egypt, as Dr. Johannes Tromp of Leiden University notes. The epistles of Ammonas of Egypt that are historically verified to be written by him provide important insight into eastern Christian monasticism in the early centuries of Christianity.

Ammonas is said to have died at the beginning of the fifth century and, according to Palladius of Galatia, was buried in a chapel called Rufinianæ.

== Quotations ==
Selected from the Sayings of the Desert Fathers and from the Letters of Ammonas:

- "The 'narrow and hard way' (Mt 7:14) is this: to control your thoughts, and to strip yourself of your own will, for the sake of God. This is also the meaning of the sentence, 'Lo, we have left everything and followed you.' (Mt 19:27)"
- "Sit in your cell and eat a little every day, keeping the world of the publican (the Jesus Prayer) always in your heart, and you may be saved."
- "If we follow our own will, God no longer sends His power which prospers and establishes all the ways of men."
- "Unless a man denies himself and his own will, and obeys his spiritual parents (elders), he will not be able to recognize God's will..."

== See also ==
- Anchorite
- Anthony the Great
- Christian monasticism
- Desert Fathers
- Or of Nitria
- Pambo
