= January 6 (Eastern Orthodox liturgics) =

Day in the Eastern Orthodox liturgical calendar

Eastern Orthodox liturgical calendar
January 5	January 6	January 7
January 6 O.S. ≍ January 19 N.S. January 6 N.S ≍ December 24 O.S.

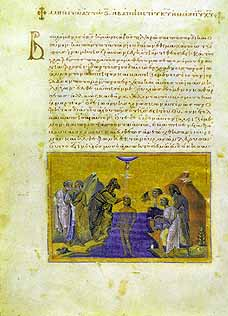
The Baptism of Christ. (Menologion of Basil II, 10th century)

January 6 in Eastern Orthodox liturgical calendars is a feast day and a day of commemoration of saints and martyrs. Although some Orthodox churches use the Revised Julian Calendar and others use the traditional Julian calendar, the fixed commemorations for their respective January 6 are broadly the same, no matter which calendar is used. (Note: Despite the dates being the same, the days to which they refer typically differ by 13 days. The notation Old Style or O.S. is sometimes used to indicate a date in the traditional Julian Calendar (the "Old Calendar"). The notation New Style or N.S, indicates a date in the Revised Julian calendar (the "New Calendar").)

== Feasts ==
- The Holy Theophany of Our Lord, God, and Saviour Jesus Christ (Baptism of the Lord) - Cross Procession with Great Blessing of Waters outdoors. (Note: A traditional greeting in some places, during the Theophany season, is: "Christ is baptized!" The response is, "In the waters of the Jordan!") (Note: Name days celebrated today include: Fotis (Φώτης); Photini (Φωτεινή); Theophanis or Theophan (Θεοφάνης); Theophania (Θεοφάνεια); Fanis (Φάνης); Fanny or Faye (Φανή); Jordan (Ἰορδάνης); Theano (Θεανῶ); Ourania or Rania (Οὐρανία); and; Theopoula (Θεοπούλα).)
- Traditionally, the beginning of the season of house blessings with Holy Water.

== Saints ==
- Venerable Evagrius of Nitria (415) (Note: The Venerable Evagrius came from Iberia and was the son of a priest. He was ordained as Reader by Saint Basil the Great and Deacon by St. Basil's brother, Bishop St. Gregory of Nyssa. God endowed him with the gift of oratory. However from this he was led to pride and almost lost his prudence, since the sin of selfishness (egoism) led him to fall in love with a rich woman. But he came to repentance and guided his steps to Jerusalem, where he again faced the temptation of pride. The Blessed Melania the Roman († December 31) became his spiritual adviser, who practiced her ascetism in a small cell (hermitage) of Jerusalem. Thus, St. Evagrius took refuge to a certain Mount of Nitria, where he lived the solitary regime of prayer, fasting and abstinence. God did not abandon him and blessed him with the gift of clairvoyance. The Blessed Evagrius reposed peacefully around 415 AD.)
- Venerable Martyr George the Persian (615)

== Pre-Schism Western saints ==
- Martyrs of North-West Africa, burnt at the stake under Septimius Severus (c. 210) (Note: "In Africa, the commemoration of many holy martyrs, who were burned at the stake in the persecution of Severus.")
- Virgin Martyr Macra, from Rheims in France, martyred in Fismes in Champagne before the persecution under Diocletian began (287) (Note: "In the Diocese of Rheims, the martyrdom of St. Macra, virgin, who, in the persecution of Diocletian, was cast into the fire by order of the governor Rictiovarus. As she remained uninjured, she had her breasts cut off, was imprisoned in a foul dungeon, rolled upon broken earthenware and burning coals, and finally she gave up her soul while engaged in prayer.")
- Martyr Anastasius, a martyr in Syrmium in Pannonia, now Hungary (4th century)
- Martyrs Anastasius, Jucundus, Florus, Florianus, Peter, Ratites, Tatia and Tilis, in Syrmium in Pannonia, now Hungary (4th century)
- Saint Hywyn, probably a companion of Saint Cadfan on his return journey from Brittany to Cornwall and Wales; by tradition he founded Aberdaron in Gwynedd (516)
- Saint Melaine (Melanius), born in Brittany, he was Bishop of Rennes and succeeded in overcoming idolatry in his diocese (c. 535) (Note: "At Rennes, in France, St. Melanius, bishop and confessor, who, after a life remarkable for virtues innumerable, with his thoughts constantly fixed on heaven, gloriously departed from this world.")
- Saint Edeyrn (Eternus), born in Britain, he was hermit and the patron saint of a church in Brittany (6th century)
- Saint Eigrad (Eugrad), a brother of Saint Samson, he was a disciple of Saint Illtyd and founded a church in Anglesey in Wales (6th century)
- Saint Schotin (Scarthin), a disciple of Saint David in Wales, lived as a hermit on Mt Mairge in Leix (County Laois) for many years (6th century) (see also: January 2)
- Saint Merinus (Mirren of Benchor), a disciple of Dunawd at Bangor in Wales and venerated there and in Brittany (6th century)
- Saint Peter of Canterbury, a monk from St Andrew's in Rome, he was one of the first missionaries sent to England (c. 607) (Note: He became first Abbot of Sts Peter and Paul (later St Augustine's Abbey), founded in Canterbury. While travelling to France he was drowned off Ambleteuse near Boulogne, where his relics are still honoured.)
- Saint Diman (Dimas, Dima), a monk with Saint Columba and afterwards Bishop of Connor in Ireland (658)
- Venerable Wiltrudis of Bergen, founded the convent of Bergen near Neuburg in Germany (c. 976) and herself became a nun and the first Abbess (986) (Note: See: (in German) Wiltrud von Bergen. Wikipedia. (German Wikipedia).)
- Saint Frederick of Arras, a monk at St Vanne and later St Vedast Abbey in Arras (1020)

== Post-Schism Orthodox saints ==
- Venerable Macarius of Mount Athos (1431)
- Saint Theophan the Recluse, Bishop of Tambov (1894) (Note: He reposed on January 6, 1894. His service is also celebrated on January 10.) (see also: January 10)
- Saint Laurence the Wonderworker of Chernigov Convent (1950) (Note: He is commemorated on December 29/January 11 and January 6/19.) (see also: December 29)

=== New martyrs and confessors ===
- New Martyr Assad the Tailor (1218)
- New Hieromartyr Romanus, Priest of Lacedemonia, at Constantinople, by the sword (1695)
- New Hieromartyr Michael Chekhranov, Archpriest and Martyr Irina Chekhranova, of Zaporozhye, Ukraine (1918) (Note: On June 26, 2016, on the Sunday of All Saints, on the day of commemoration of the Synaxis of the New Martyrs and Confessors of Zaporozhye (June 13), they were glorified in the Zaporozhye diocese as Hieromartyr Mikhail Chekhranov and Martyr Irina Chekhranova.)

== Other commemorations ==
- Repose of Schemamonk Nicholas of Valaam (1824)
- Repose of Schemamonk Sergius Yanovsky (1876), disciple of Saint Herman of Alaska.

== Icon gallery ==
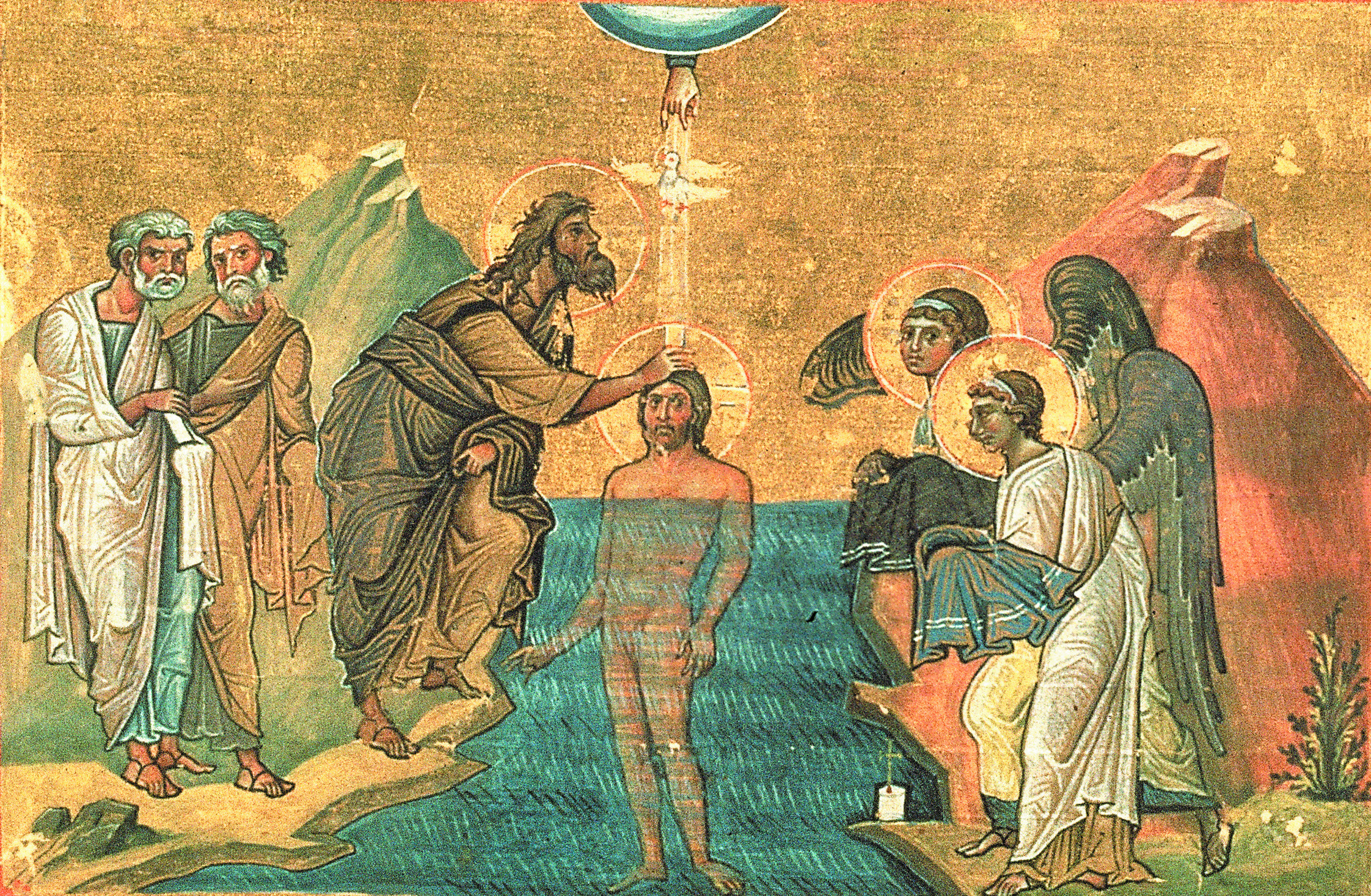
The Holy Theophany of Our Lord, God, and Saviour Jesus Christ.
(Menologion of Basil II, 10th century).

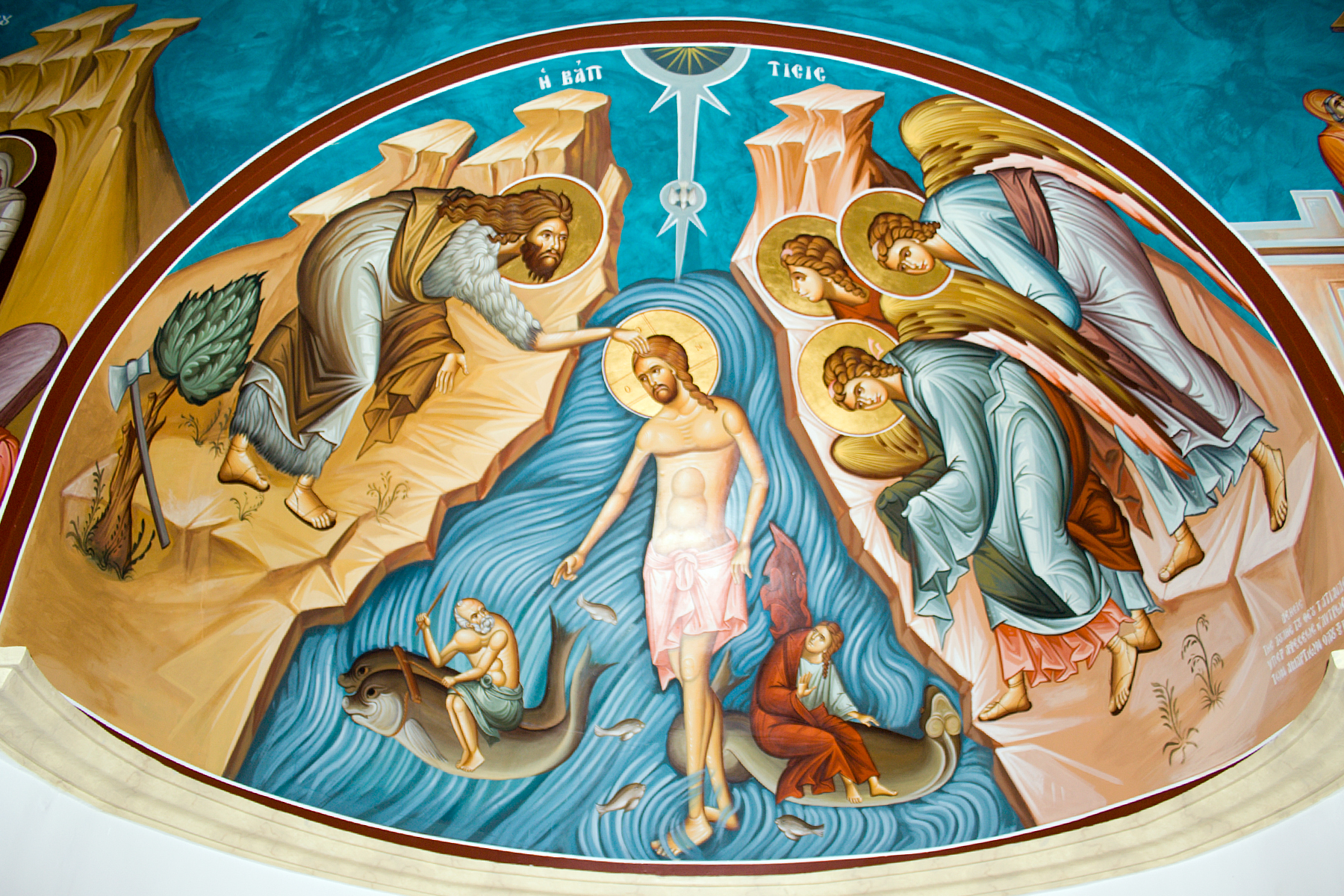
The Holy Theophany of Our Lord, God, and Saviour Jesus Christ.
(Mural from the interior of St. John the Baptist Church at the Jordan River, depicting Jesus' baptism).

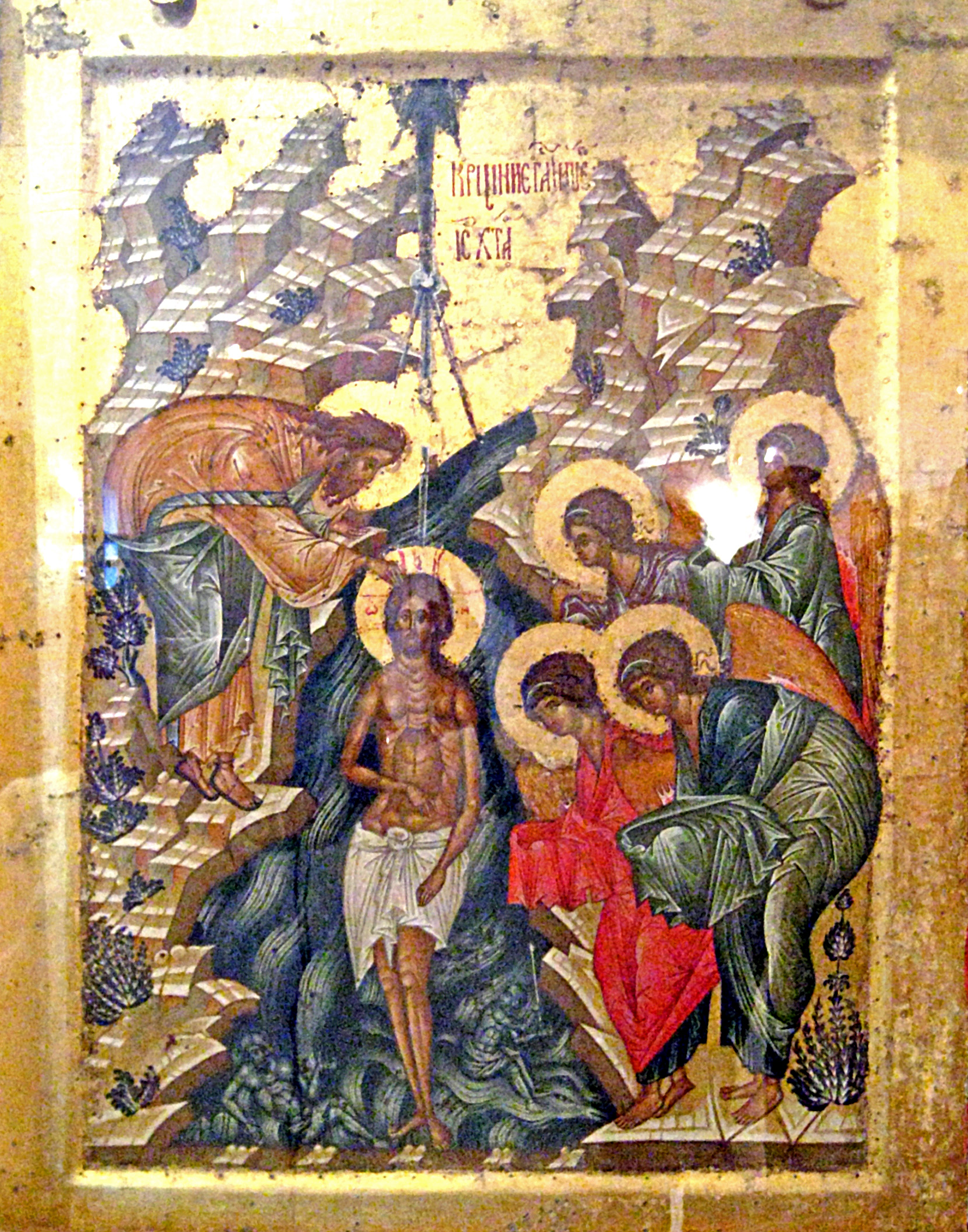
Baptism of the Lord.
(Church of the Assumption of the Mother of God, Kilillo-Byelozhersk (1497)).

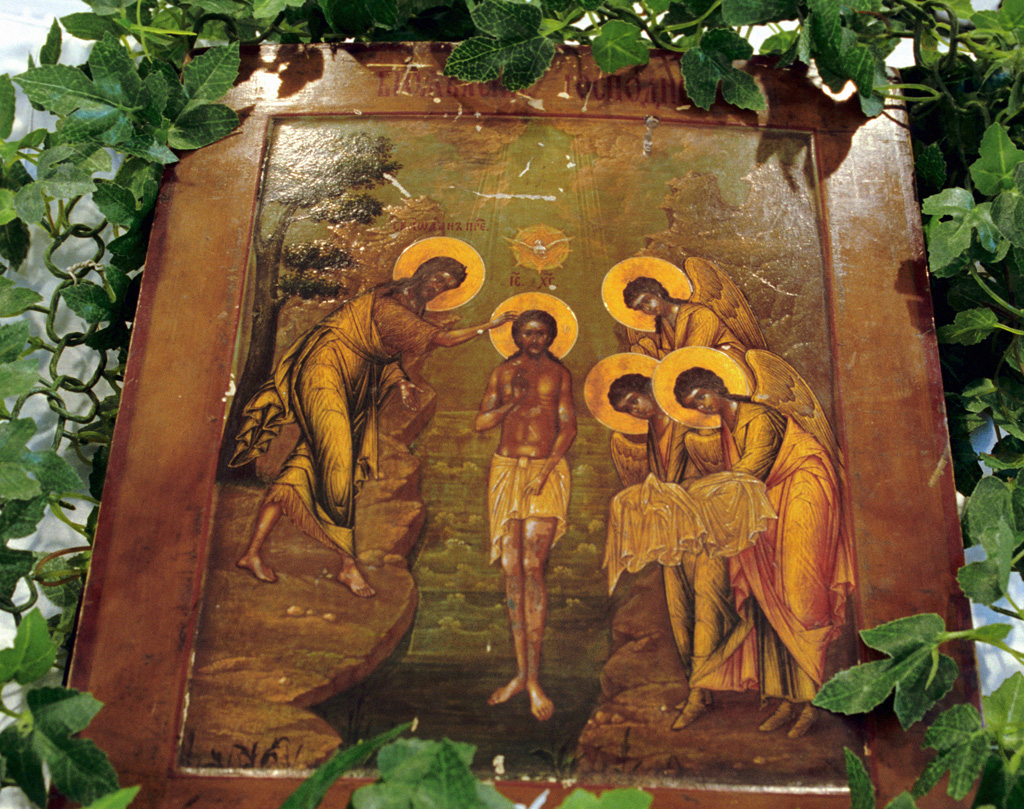
The Baptism of Our Lord. Miracle-working icon.
(17th century. Novo-Tikhvinsky Convent).

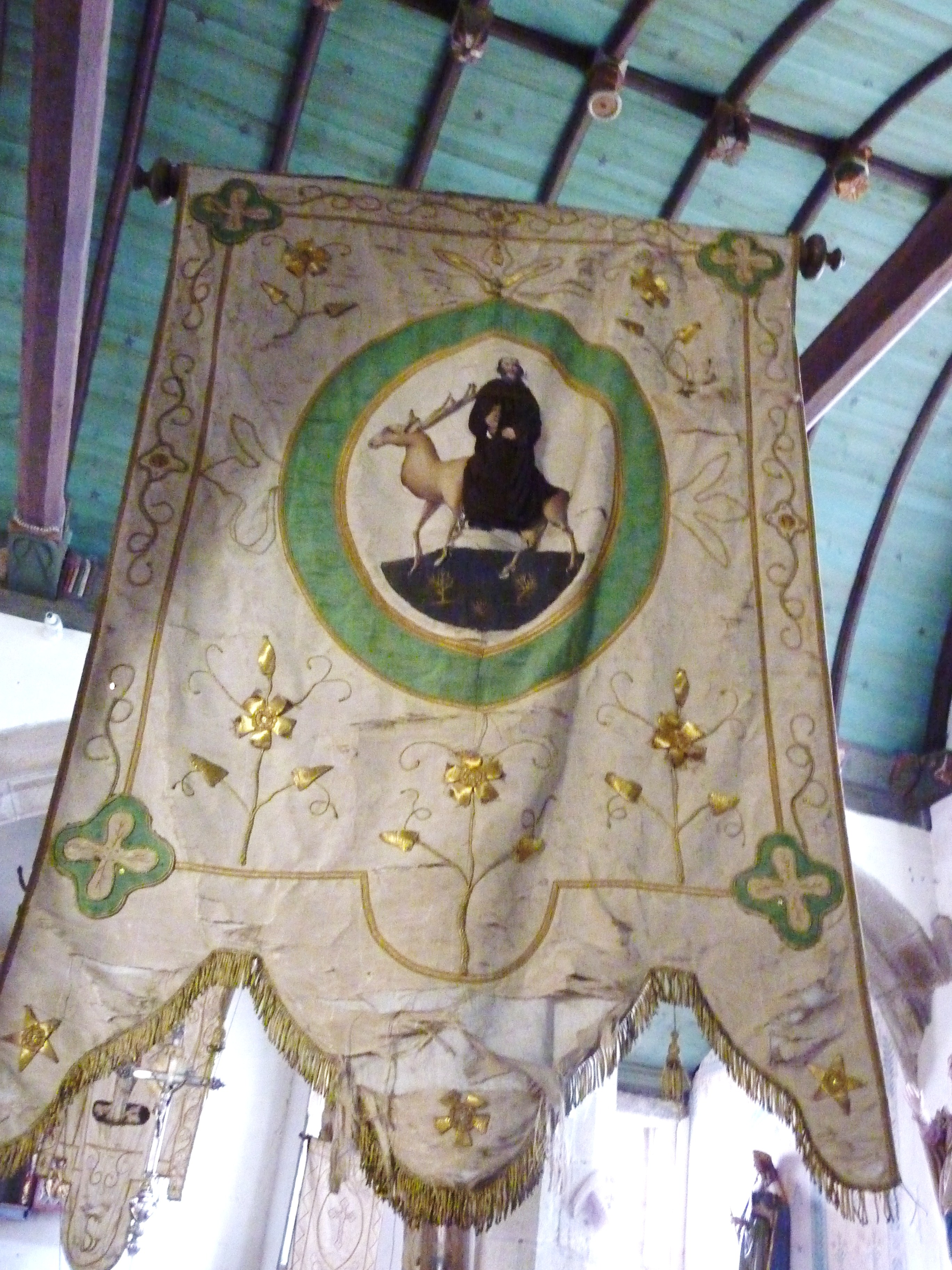
The standard of St. Edeyrn (Eternus), at Loqueffret, France.

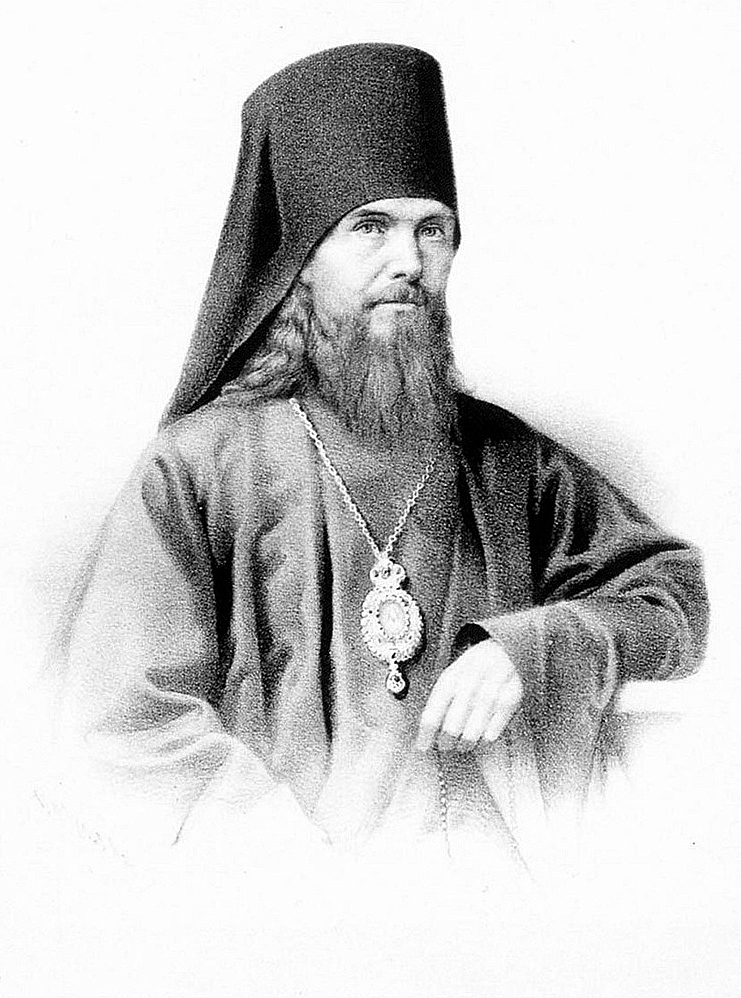
Saint Theophan the Recluse.

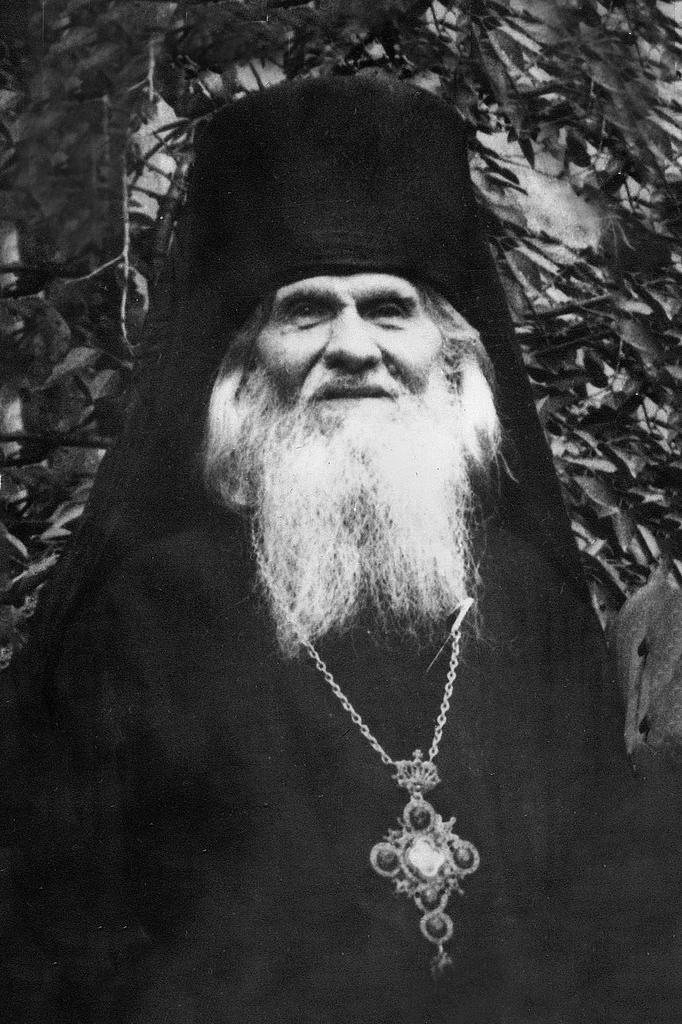
Venerable Laurence of Chernigov.

== Sources ==
- January 6/January 19. Orthodox Calendar (PRAVOSLAVIE.RU).
- January 19 / January 6. HOLY TRINITY RUSSIAN ORTHODOX CHURCH (A parish of the Patriarchate of Moscow).
- January 6. OCA - The Lives of the Saints.
- The Autonomous Orthodox Metropolia of Western Europe and the Americas (ROCOR). St. Hilarion Calendar of Saints for the year of our Lord 2004. St. Hilarion Press (Austin, TX). pp. 5–6.
- January 6. Latin Saints of the Orthodox Patriarchate of Rome.
- The Roman Martyrology. Transl. by the Archbishop of Baltimore. Last Edition, According to the Copy Printed at Rome in 1914. Revised Edition, with the Imprimatur of His Eminence Cardinal Gibbons. Baltimore: John Murphy Company, 1916. p. 7.

Greek Sources

- Great Synaxaristes: (in Greek) 6 ΙΑΝΟΥΑΡΙΟΥ. ΜΕΓΑΣ ΣΥΝΑΞΑΡΙΣΤΗΣ.
- (in Greek) Συναξαριστής. 6 Ιανουαρίου. ECCLESIA.GR. (H ΕΚΚΛΗΣΙΑ ΤΗΣ ΕΛΛΑΔΟΣ).

Russian Sources

- (in Russian) 19 января (6 января). Православная Энциклопедия под редакцией Патриарха Московского и всея Руси Кирилла (электронная версия). (Orthodox Encyclopedia - Pravenc.ru).
- (in Russian) 6 января (ст.ст.) 19 января 2014 (нов. ст.). Русская Православная Церковь Отдел внешних церковных связей. (DECR).
