= Patericon =

Genre of Byzantine religious literature

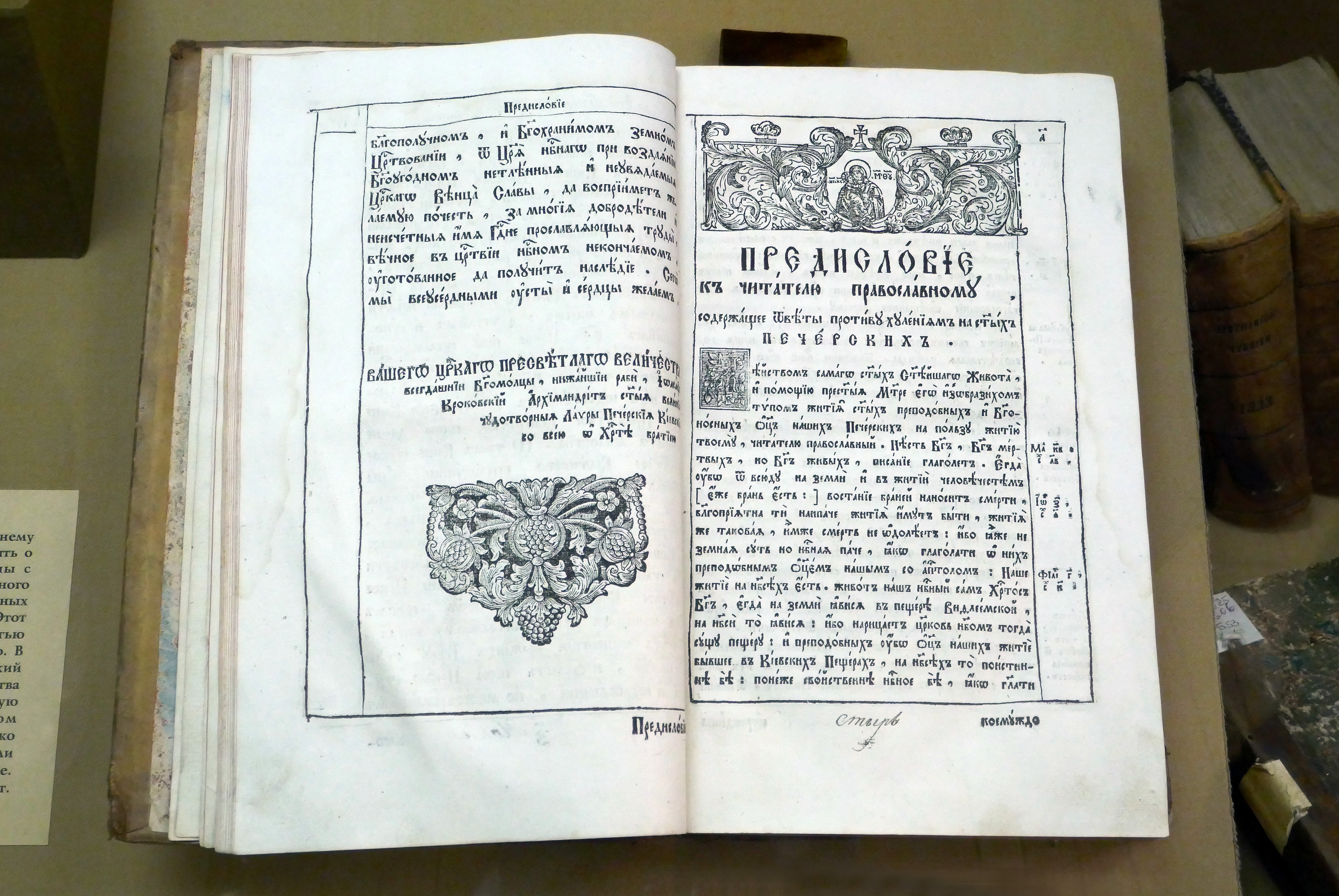
The Kievan Cave Patericon (Russia, 1758).

Patericon or paterikon (Greek: πατερικόν), a short form for πατερικόν βιβλίον ("father's book", usually Lives of the Fathers in English), and sometimes also known as gerontikon (Greek: γεροντικόν), is a genre of Byzantine literature of religious character, which were collections of sayings of saints, martyrs and hierarchs, and tales about them. These texts also have their roots in early monasticism.

Among the earliest collections of this kind are the Αποφθέγματα των άγίων γερόντων (Apophthegmata of Saint Elders, also known as the Alphabetical Patericon, Apophthegmata Patrum, Sayings of the Fathers of the Desert (Sayings of the Desert Fathers) ), the Historia monachorum in Aegypto and Λαυσαϊχόν (Historia Lausiaca, ) by Palladius - of the 4th century. Various paterica also known in translations into a number of languages (Latin, Slavonic, Coptic, Armenian, etc.)

In Russian Orthodoxy this kind of literature is known from the early Slavic literature, first translations, then original texts created in various monasteries. The popular paterica in the Russian monastic scene included the Kievan Cave patericon, the patericon of Volokolamsk Monastery, and the patericon of Solovki Monastery. The Kievan Cave patericon dates back from the first half of the 13th century and it also includes tales about the history of the monastery and its first monks such as the correspondence between Bishop Simon of Vladimir-Suzdal and the cave monk Polikarp. The text is based on the paterica compiled in the centers of Eastern Orthodox Church and was preserved in three 15th-century redactions: Arsenian (1406), First Cassian (1460), and Second Cassian (1462).

== Some paterica ==
- Glinsk Patericon (Redding, California: St. Xenia Skete)
- Valaam Patericon, a paterikon of the Valaam Monastery
- Ioanichie Balan, Romanian Patericon: Saints of the Romanian Orthodox Church ISBN 978-0-938635-97-0
- Daniel M. Rogich, Serbian Patericon: Saints of the Serbian Orthodox Church ISBN 978-0-938635-75-8
- Scete Patericon, an early Slavonic translation of Apophthegmata Patrum
- Kyiv Caves Patericon, a patericon of the Kyiv Pechersk Lavra (13th century)
- Volokolamsk Patericon (16th century)
- An Athonite Gerontikon (2003) (English translation; originally published in Greek as Αθωνικόν Γεροντικόν (2003))

== See also ==
- Synaxarion
- Patristics
- Kiev Patericon reference to St. Mark of the Caves
