= January 10 (Eastern Orthodox liturgics) =

Day in the Eastern Orthodox liturgical calendar

Eastern Orthodox liturgical calendar
January 9	January 10	January 11
January 10 O.S. ≍ January 23 N.S. January 10 N.S ≍ December 28 O.S.

An Eastern Orthodox cross

January 10 in Eastern Orthodox liturgical calendars is a feast day and a day of commemoration of saints and martyrs. Although some Orthodox churches use the Revised Julian Calendar and others use the traditional Julian calendar, the fixed commemorations for their respective January 10 are broadly the same, no matter which calendar is used. (Note: Despite the dates being the same, the days to which they refer typically differ by 13 days. The notation Old Style or O.S. is sometimes used to indicate a date in the traditional Julian Calendar (the "Old Calendar"). The notation New Style or N.S, indicates a date in the Revised Julian calendar (the "New Calendar").).

== Feasts ==
- Afterfeast of the Theophany of Our Lord and Savior Jesus Christ

== Saints ==
- Blessed Theosebia the Deaconess, sister of Saints Macrina the Younger, Basil the Great, Peter of Sebaste, and Gregory of Nyssa (385)
- Saint Gregory, Bishop of Nyssa, Cappadocia (c. 394)
- Venerable Ammon, Monk of Nitria in Egypt (5th century) (Note: There are three lives of "Venerable Ammons" who excelled in holiness. One was a student of Anthony the Great. The other was a student of Abba Pambo, who cut off the monks' ear, so that he would not become a bishop. And the third built cells to house new monks who attended the hermitage. Which of the three is the saint celebrated on 10 January is unknown. We only know that all three lived in the desert and spent their lives as Venerable monks.)
- Saint Marcian the Presbyter of Constantinople (471)
- Venerable Domitian (Dometian), Bishop of Melitene and Wonderworker (601)

== Pre-Schism Western saints ==
- Saint Pétrone (Petronius), monk at Lérins Abbey, then Bishop of Die in France (463)
- Saint Diarmaid the Just (Dermot, Diarmis), spiritual father of St Kieran of Clonmacnois and later founder of a monastery on Innis-Clotran Island, Ireland (6th century)
- Saint Tómméne (Thomian, Toimen), Archbishop of Armagh in Ireland (c. 660)
- Saint Sæthryth (Sethrid), Abbess (c. 660) (Note: Stepdaughter of Anna, King of East Anglia. She became a nun at Faremoutiers-en-Brie in France under St Fara, whom she succeeded as abbess. She was the half-sister of Sts Etheldred (Audrey) and Ethelburgh.) (Note: "Being called to the religious state, ST. SETHRYDA retired, with her half-sister, St. Ethelburga, and her niece, St. Ercongota, to the Abbey of Faremontiers, whilst the foundress, St. Fara, or Burgundofora, was still alive. So great was the esteem, in which the English strangers were held, and so high the reputation of their holy lives, that the two sisters were successively chosen to be Abbesses, and are counted among the Saints of God.")
- Saint John Camillus the Good, Bishop of Milan, he worked against Arianism and Monothelitism (669)
- Saint Agatho, Pope of Rome (681) (Note: A Sicilian from Palermo, he called for the holding of the Sixth Oecumenical Council in Constantinople in 680 against Monothelitism.) (see also: February 20 - East)
- Saint Peter Urseolus (Pietro I Orseolo), Doge of Venice, later became a monk at the Monastery of Cuxa in Spain (987) (Note: "In the monastery of Cusani, the birthday of St. Peter Urseolus (Orsini), confessor, previously Doge of Venice, and afterwards monk of the Order of St. Benedict, renowned for piety and miracles.")

== Post-Schism Orthodox saints ==
- Venerable Paul, founder and Abbot of Obnora Monastery, Vologda (1429) (Note: See: (in Russian) Павел Обнорский. Википедии. (Russian Wikipedia).)
- Venerable Macarius (Makarios) of Pisemsk, Kostroma, and Obnora Monastery in Vologda, founder and Abbot of Pisma Monastery (15th century) (Note: The Monk Makarii of Pisemsk and Kostroma – was a co-ascetic of the Monk Paul of Obnorsk. He was the founder, in the second half of the 14th century, of the Makar'ev Transfiguration wilderness monastery, at the River Pis'ma in the Kostroma outskirts.) (Note: See: (in Russian) Макарий Писемский. Википедии. (Russian Wikipedia).)
- Venerable Antipas of Calapodesti in Romania, Mount Athos, and Valaam Monastery, Hieroschemamonk (1882)
- Venerable Theophan the Recluse, Bishop of Tambov (1894) (see also: January 6)

=== New martyrs and confessors ===
- New Venerable Martyr Ephraim, Elder of Obnora Monastery, Vologda, and six monks of Obnora whose relics are incorrupt (1538)
- New Hieromartyr Zenobius Sutormin, Priest (1920)
- New Hieromartyr Peter Uspensky, Archpriest of Radushino (Zaraisk) (1930)
- New Hieromartyr Anatole (Anatolius) Grisyuk, Metropolitan of Odessa and Cherson (1938) (Note: See: (in Russian) Анатолий (Грисюк). Википедия. (Russian Wikipedia).)
- New Martyr Arsenia Dobronravova, Abbess of the Holy Resurrection–St. Theodore Convent (Shuisk) (1939) (Note: See: (in Russian) Арсения (Добронравова). Википедии. (Russian Wikipedia).)

== Icon gallery ==
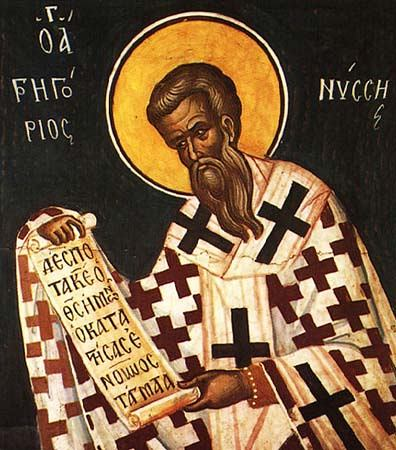
Saint Gregory of Nyssa.

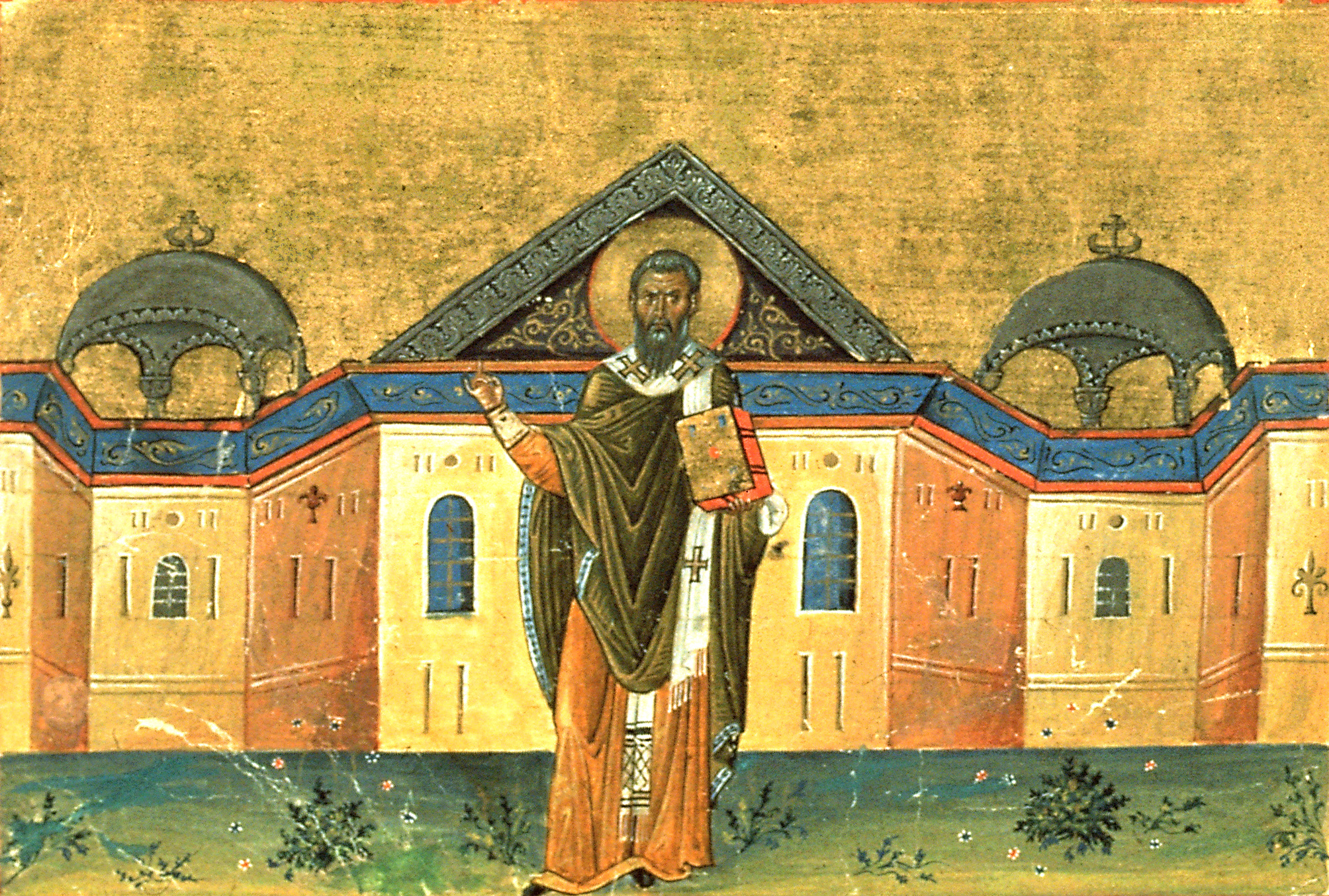
Saint Gregory of Nyssa.
(Menologion of Basil II, 10th century).

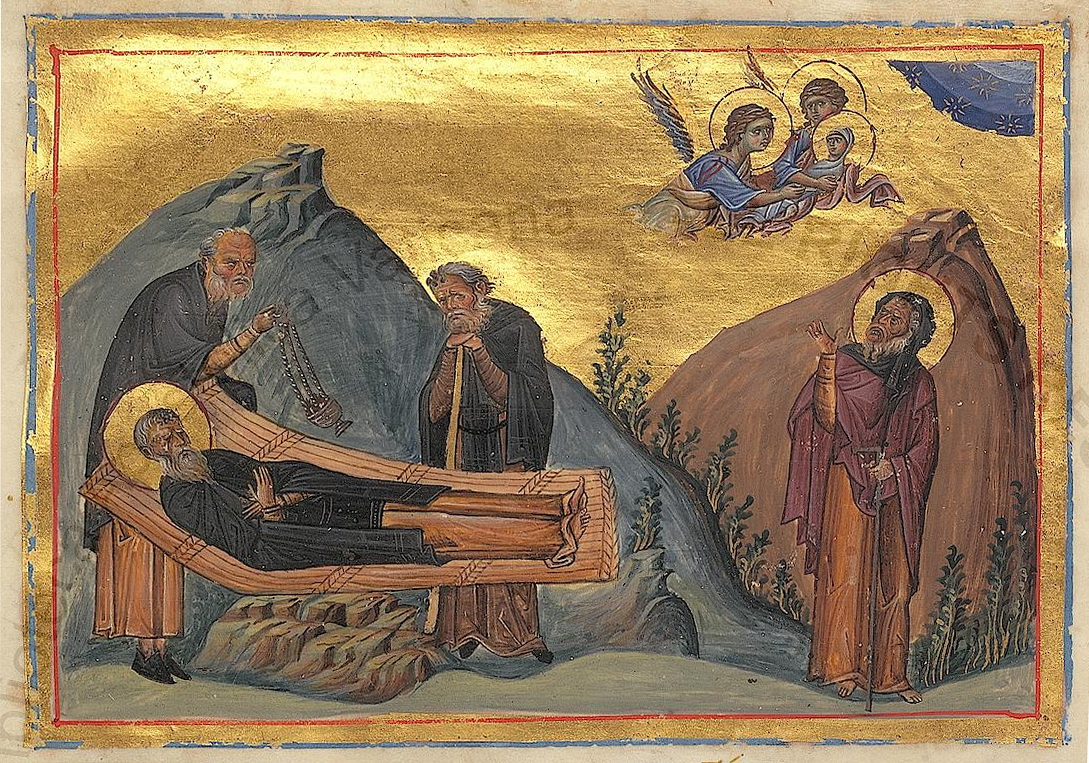
Venerable Ammon, monk, at Scetis, Egypt.
(Menologion of Basil II, 10th century).

St. Marcian the Presbyter of Constantinople.
(Menologion of Basil II, 10th century).

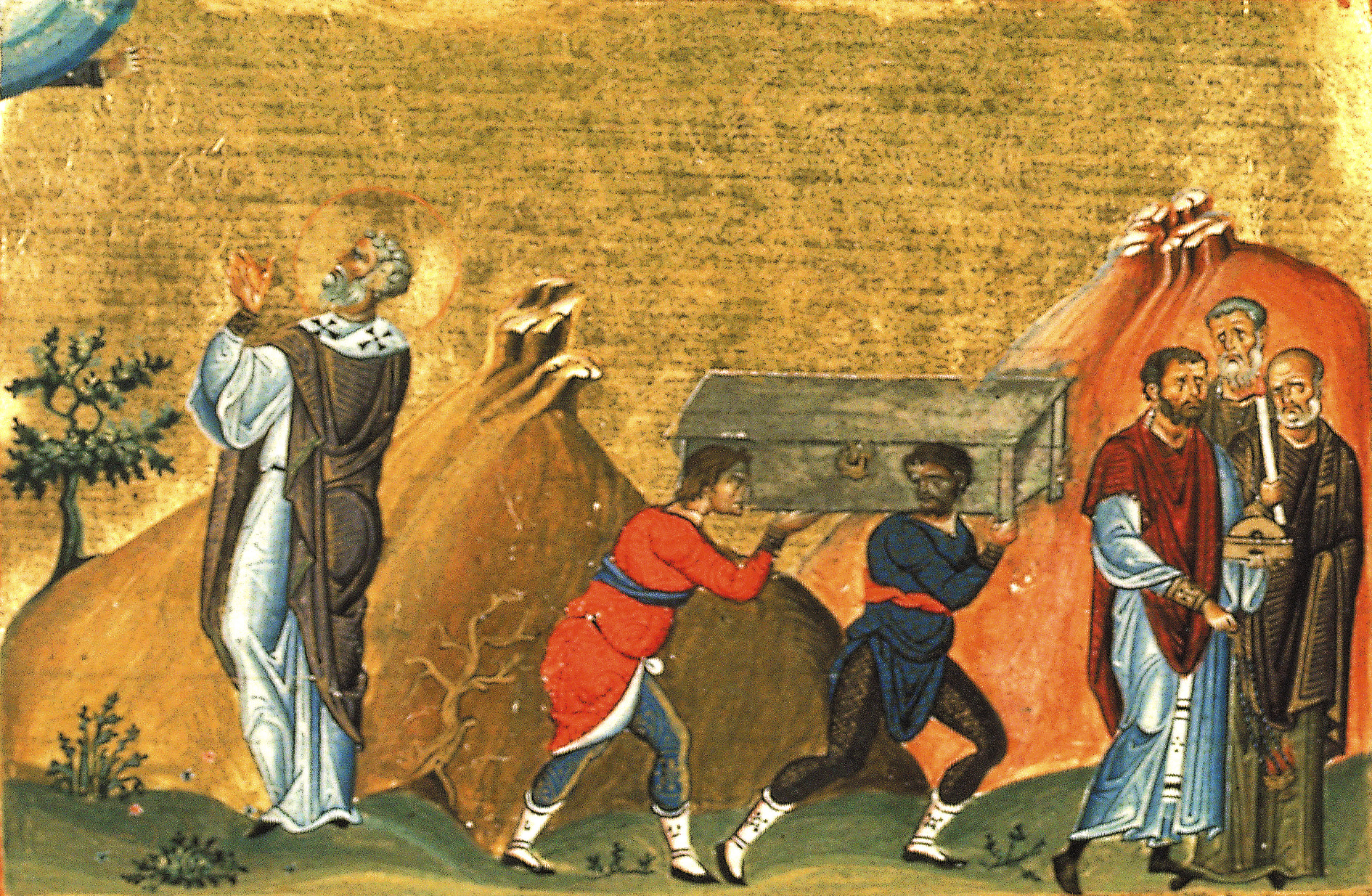
Burial of Dometian, Bishop of Melitene.
(Menologion of Basil II, 10th century).

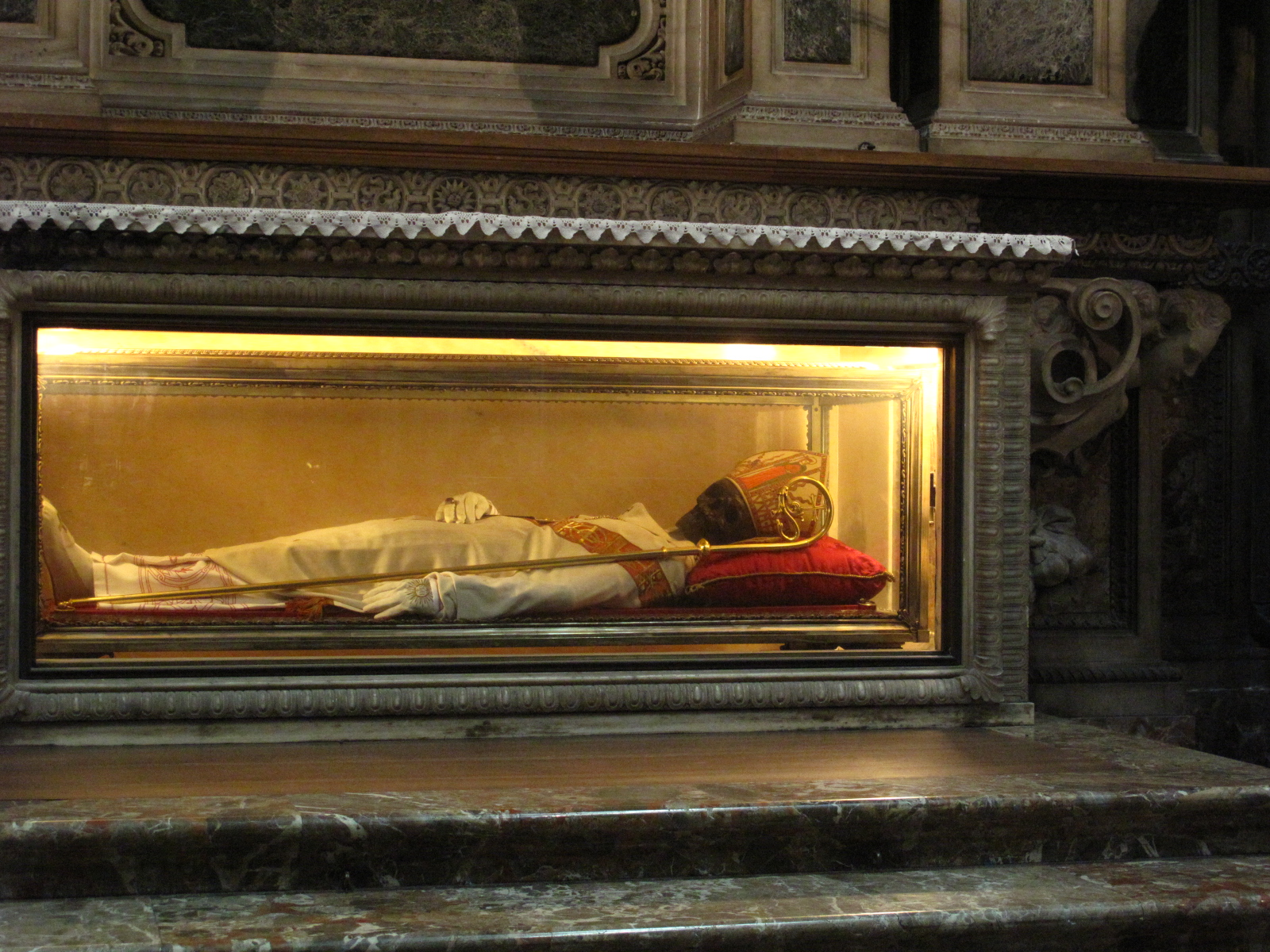
Relic of Saint John Camillus the Good, Cathedral of Milan.

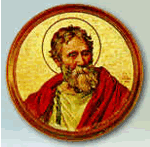
Saint Agatho, Pope of Rome.

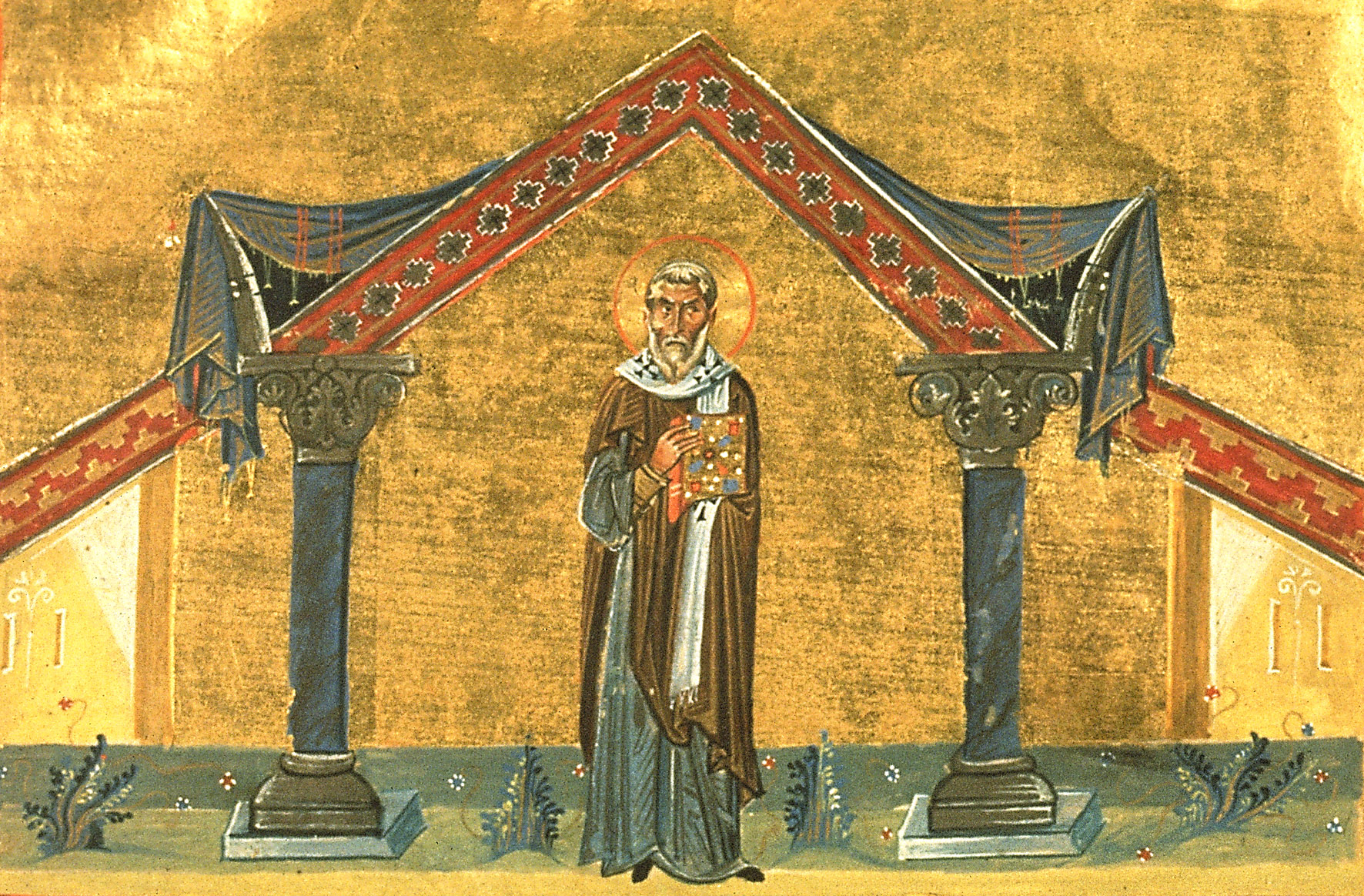
Saint Agatho, Pope of Rome.
(Menologion of Basil II, 10th century).

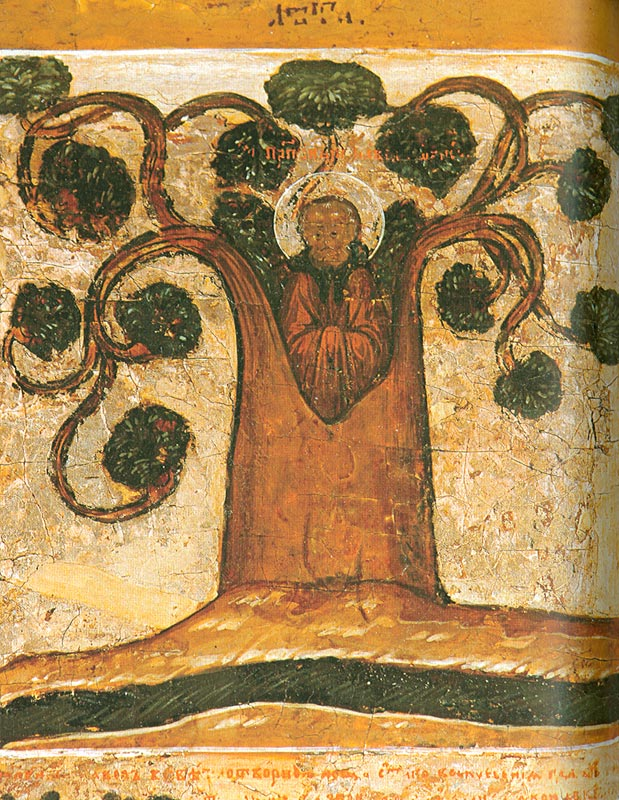
Venerable Paul, of Obnora Monastery, Vologda, saved in the hollow of a linden tree.

Venerable Antipas of Calapodesti in Romania, Mount Athos, and Valaam Monastery, Hieroschemamonk.

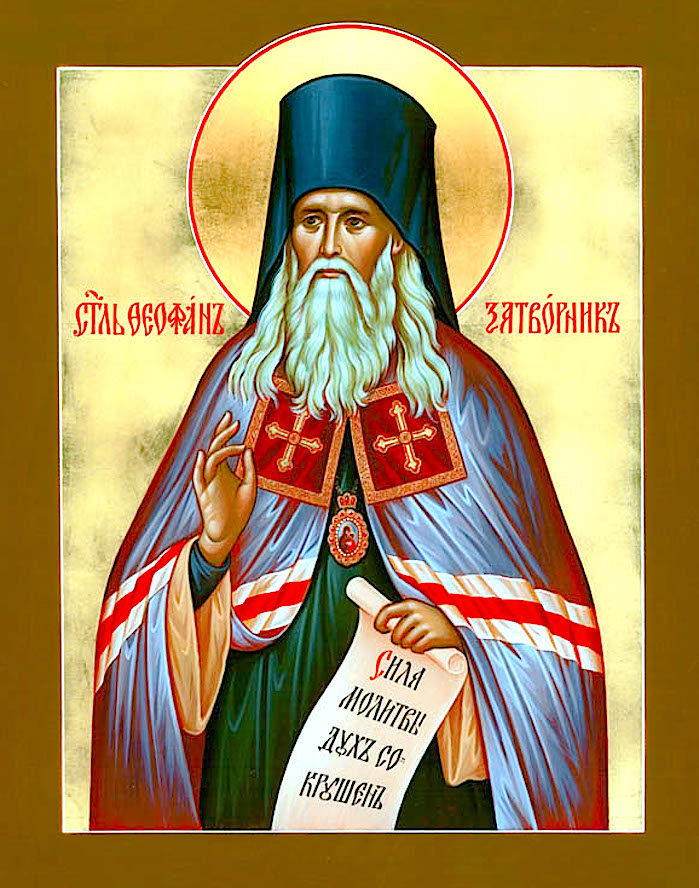
Venerable Theophan the Recluse, Bishop of Tambov.

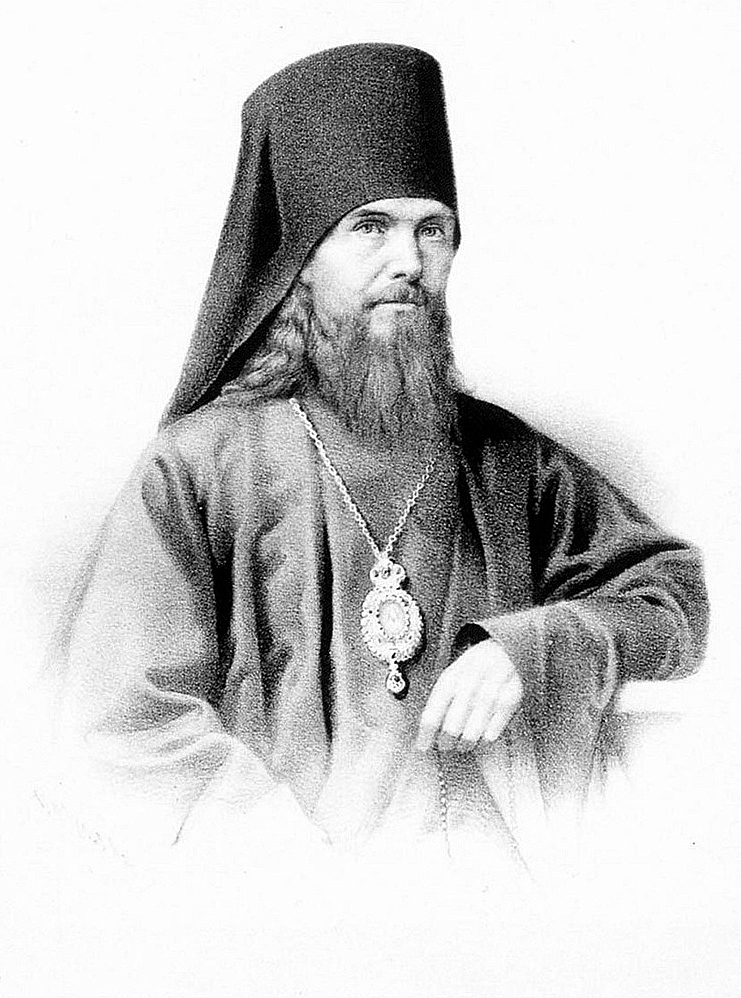
Venerable Theophan the Recluse, Bishop of Tambov.

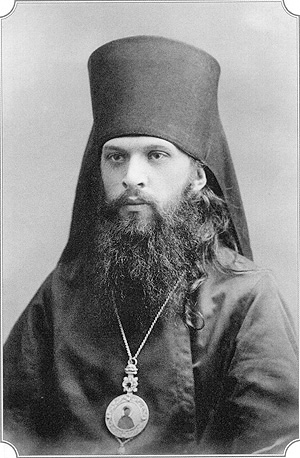
New Hieromartyr Anatole (Anatolius) Grisyuk, Metropolitan of Odessa and Cherson.

== Sources ==
- January 10/January 23. Orthodox Calendar (PRAVOSLAVIE.RU).
- January 23 / January 10. HOLY TRINITY RUSSIAN ORTHODOX CHURCH (A parish of the Patriarchate of Moscow).
- January 10. OCA - The Lives of the Saints.
- The Autonomous Orthodox Metropolia of Western Europe and the Americas (ROCOR). St. Hilarion Calendar of Saints for the year of our Lord 2004. St. Hilarion Press (Austin, TX). p. 6.
- January 10. Latin Saints of the Orthodox Patriarchate of Rome.
- The Roman Martyrology. Transl. by the Archbishop of Baltimore. Last Edition, According to the Copy Printed at Rome in 1914. Revised Edition, with the Imprimatur of His Eminence Cardinal Gibbons. Baltimore: John Murphy Company, 1916. p. 11.

Greek Sources

- Great Synaxaristes: (in Greek) 10 ΙΑΝΟΥΑΡΙΟΥ. ΜΕΓΑΣ ΣΥΝΑΞΑΡΙΣΤΗΣ.
- (in Greek) Συναξαριστής. 10 Ιανουαρίου. ECCLESIA.GR. (H ΕΚΚΛΗΣΙΑ ΤΗΣ ΕΛΛΑΔΟΣ).

Russian Sources

- (in Russian) 23 января (10 января). Православная Энциклопедия под редакцией Патриарха Московского и всея Руси Кирилла (электронная версия). (Orthodox Encyclopedia - Pravenc.ru).
- (in Russian) 10 января (ст.ст.) 23 января 2013 (нов. ст.). Русская Православная Церковь Отдел внешних церковных связей. (DECR).
