= Benjamin of Nitria =

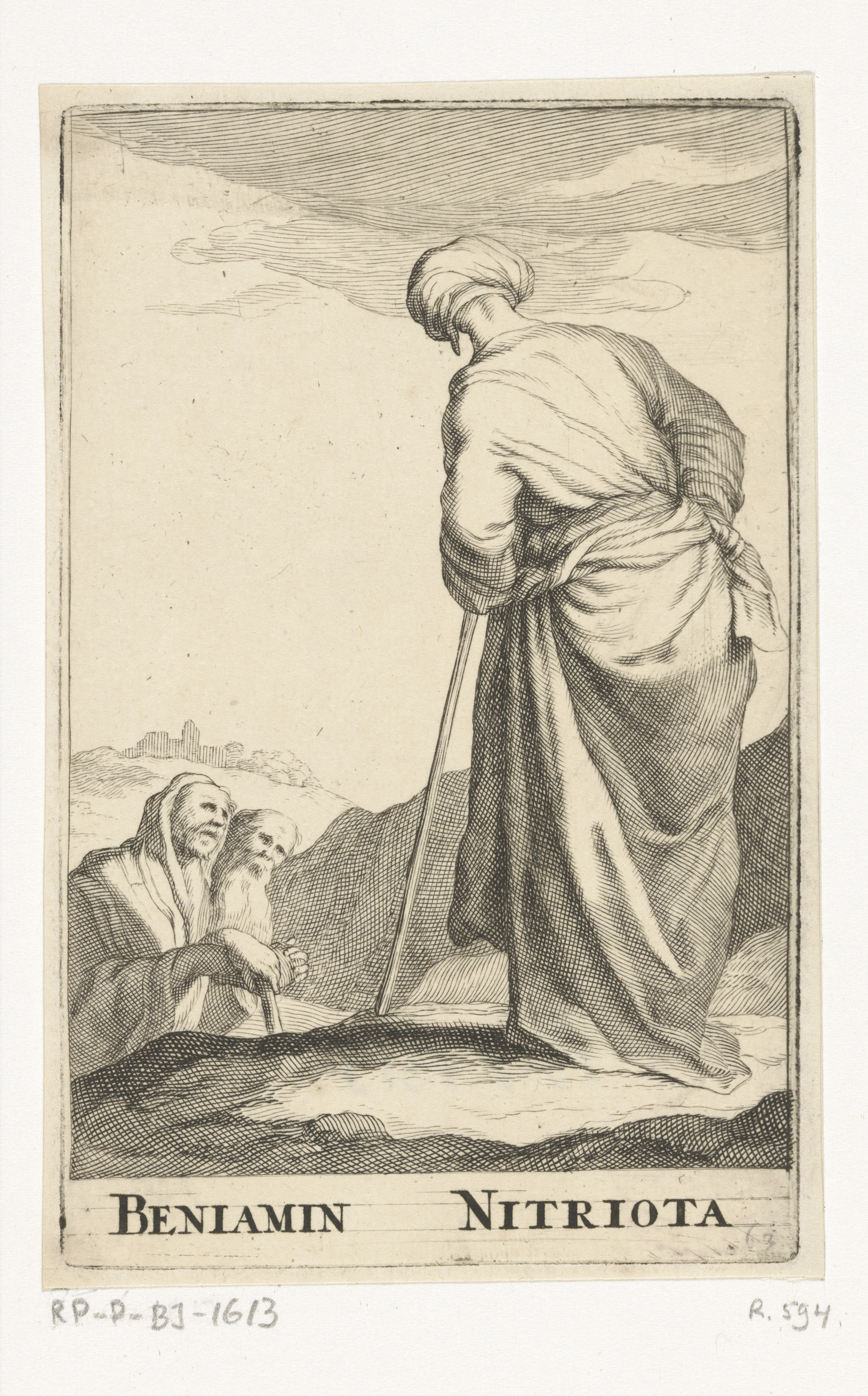

Benjamin of Nitria is the name of two Orthodox saints.

The first saint (died 392) was a reverend monk who lived ascetically on Mount Nitria and was granted the gift of healing: he healed the sick by laying his hands on them or giving them oil. Eight months before his death, St. Benjamin fell ill with dropsy (ὄγκος - possibly referring to elephantiasis). For his physical suffering, Bishop Palladius of Helenopolis called him a second Job. Benjamin's body swelled so much that he could no longer lie in bed, but, constantly sitting on a bench (δίv φρος), he healed others from various ailments. His only request for himself was prayer, so that his inner man would not become ill. When the saint died, the threshold and doorframe of his cell had to be dismantled to remove his swollen body. Palladius reports that St. Benjamin lived for approximately 80 years. Feast day 29 January.

The second saint Benjamin (died 424) was a 5th-century ascetic hermit who was martyred under the order of the Persian King, Varanes V. He is considered to be one of the first Orthodox hermits in Egyptian Lands. He is also considered to be a “Physician” gifted the power of Healing. According to legend, anyone he would touch would be healed immediately.
