= Dayr al-Maymūn =

Village in Giza Governorate, Egypt

Dayr al-Maymūn, more known by its former name Pispir as it is referred to by Athanasius of Alexandria in his biography of St. Anthony, is a mountain in Giza Governorate, Egypt, directly east of the Nile River. It is known to be the place where Anthony the Great settled from 286 – 305 AD after leaving his spoils in Alexandria to pursue a more ascetic lifestyle following his inspiration by a verse from Mark (10:21b), which stated, "Go, sell what you have and give it to [the] poor." During his stay, many followers of Anthony settled around the mountain. They waited there until he yielded to their request to start a monastic community of hermits. The movement travelled eastward from Pispir. The site of Dayr al-Maymūn was also at one point the location of a Roman fort, whose ruins Anthony settled in during his stay at Pispir.

East of the site in the Eastern Desert is the Monastery of St. Anthony.
