= Mark of the Caves =

Hermit and Eastern Orthodox/Catholic saint

Saint Mark of the Caves
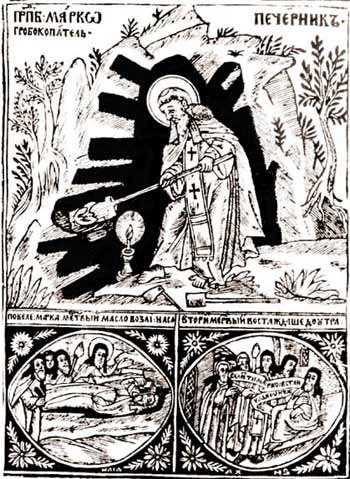
- Venerated in: Eastern Orthodox Church, Eastern Catholic Churches
- Feast: December 29

The precise dates of the lives of hermit Mark of the Caves, (also known as Mark the Grave-digger) and the two brothers Theophil and John are not recorded, however, their story is preserved in the Kiev Caves Paterikon.

Mark is noted for his service to Theophil and John in the paterikon because of his gift of discernment and powerful vocation of intercession with the Lord.

Mark, Theophil and John are commemorated 29 December in the Eastern Orthodox Church and Byzantine Catholic Churches.

== See also ==
- Russian Orthodox Church
- Poustinia
- John the Hairy
- Theoctiste of Lesbos
