= Paphnutius =

The Greek name Paphnutius (Παφνούτιος) takes its origin in Egyptian pa-ph-nuti ("the [man] of God" or "that who belongs to God"; see the Coptic name "Papnoute"). The name entered Russian as Пафнутий (for example, the famous mathematician Pafnuty Chebyshev).

== People ==
- Paphnutius of Tentyra (3rd century AD), follower of a saint

=== Saints ===
- Paphnutius of Thebes (4th century AD), aka "Paphnutius the Confessor", a bishop
- Paphnutius the Ascetic (4th century AD), aka "Paphnutius the Hermit"
- Hieromartyr Paphnutius of Jerusalem (284-305), who was martyred with 546 companions. See April 19 (Eastern Orthodox liturgics).
- Paphnutius, recluse of the Kiev Caves Monastery
- Paphnutius of Borovsk; see List of Russian saints (until 15th century)
- Paphnutius the Bishop (10th century AD)

== Other uses ==
- Paphnutius (play), a medieval play about the ascetic
