= Thaïs (saint) =

4th-century Alexandrine saint

Saint Thaïs
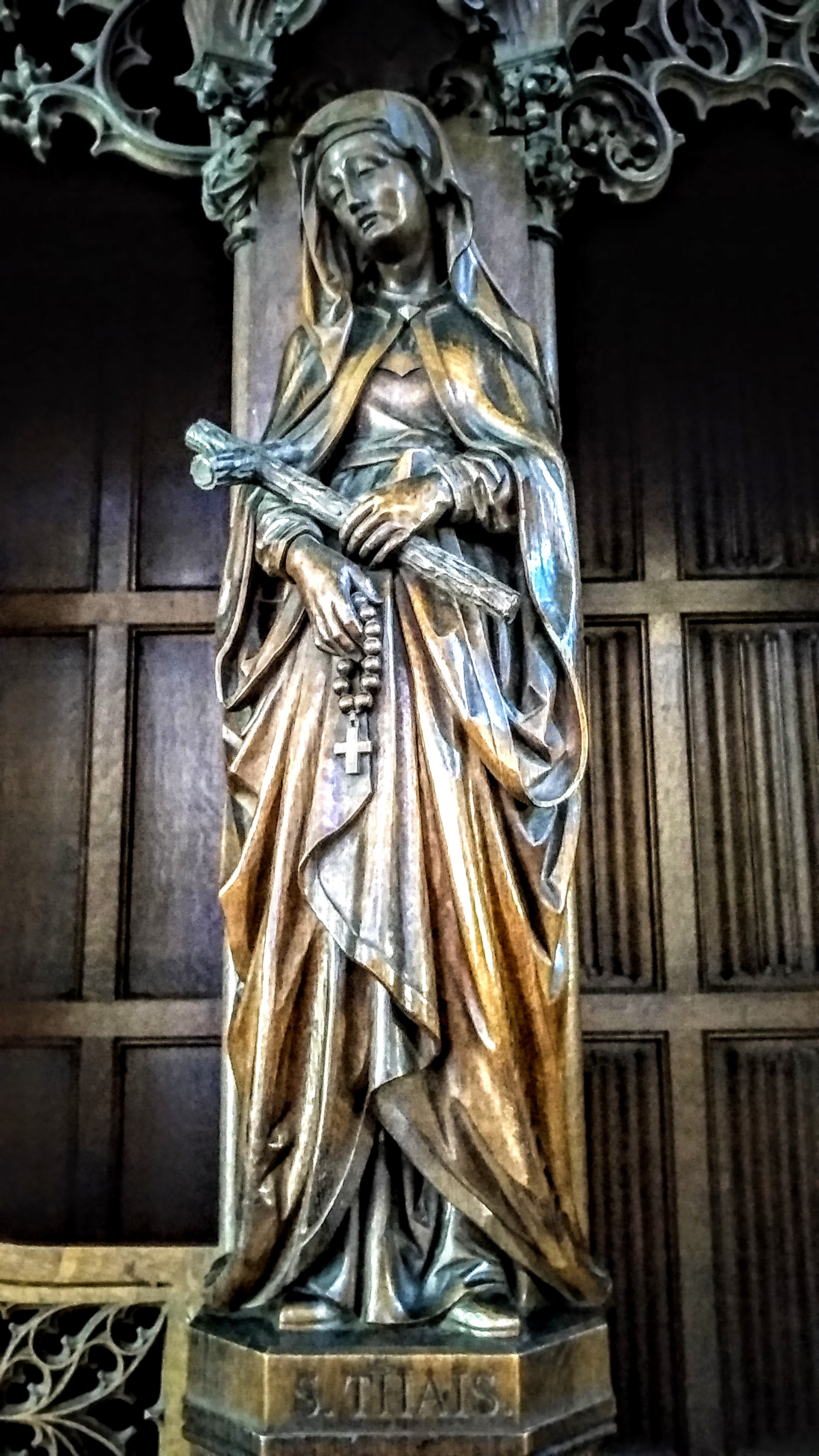
- Sculpture of Saint Thaïs in the Église Saint-Boniface, Ixelles, Belgium
- Born: c. 4th century
- Died: c. 4th century
- Venerated in: Roman Catholicism, Eastern Orthodox Church
- Feast: October 8

St. Thaïs, of fourth-century Roman Alexandria and of the Egyptian desert, was a repentant courtesan.

== Hagiography, biography ==
=== Ancient writings ===
St. Thaïs reportedly lived during the fourth century in Roman Egypt. Her story is included in hagiographic literature on the lives of the saints in the Greek church. Two such biographical sketches exist. The first, in Greek, perhaps originated during the fifth century. It was translated into Latin as the Vita Thaisis ["Life of Thaïs"] by Dionysius Exiguus during the sixth or seventh century. The other sketch comes to us in medieval Latin from Marbod of Rennes (d. 1123). Thaïs also appears in Greek martyrologies by Maurolychus and Greven, but not in Latin martyrologies. The lives of the desert saints and hermits of Egypt, including St. Thaïs, were collected in the Vitae Patrum ("Lives of the Fathers").

=== Modern sources ===
There has emerged a modern theory that suggests she is a legend deriving from "probably only a moral tale invented for edification." The saint shares her name with another Thaïs of wide notoriety in the Hellenistic world, many hundreds of years before. Of Ancient Athens, she had traveled to Persia with the campaign of Alexander. Notwithstanding, St. Thaïs remains on the Calendar of the Catholic Church, with her feast day October 8.

In 1901 the Egyptologist Albert Gayet (1856–1916) announced the discovery near Antinoë in Egypt of the mummified remains of St. Thaïs and of Bishop Sérapion. The two mummies were exhibited at the Musée Guimet in Paris. Shortly thereafter he qualified his identification, leaving open the possibility that the remains were not those of these two saints.

=== Accounts of her life ===
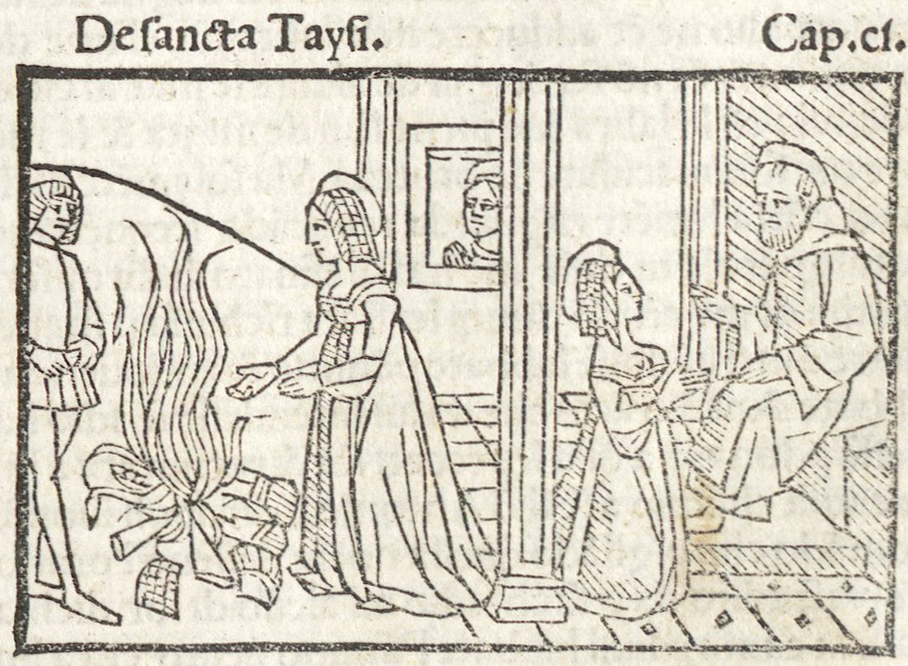
St. Thaïs in the Golden Legend (1497).

Thaïs is first briefly described as wealthy and beautiful, a courtesan living in the cosmopolitan city of Alexandria. Yet in the eyes of the church she was a public sinner. Thaïs, however, makes inquiries about the Christian religion and eventually converts. In her Vita a monk in disguise pays for entry into her chambers in order to challenge her and convert her, yet he finds that she already believes in God, from whom nothing is hidden. The identity of this person who instructs and offers Thaïs ways of spiritual transformation is unclear, three names being mentioned: St. Paphnutius (Egyptian Bishop in Upper Thebaïd), St. Bessarion (disciple of St. Anthony in the Egyptian desert), and St. Serapion (Bishop in the Nile Delta).

Following her acceptance into the Church, Thaïs is shown a convent cell where she is provisioned for three years. During her years of solitude she performs penance for her sins. When she later emerges, it is said, she lives among the nuns of the Egyptian desert only for a brief period of fifteen days, before she dies.

== In art and literature ==
=== Traditional ===
==== Church renderings ====
Traditional pictures of Thaïs show her in two different scenes:

- Burning her treasures and ornaments.
- Praying in a convent cell, with a scroll on which is written "Thou who didst create me have mercy on me."

==== Medieval play by Hrotsvitha ====
Hrotsvitha of Gandersheim (935–1002), a Benedictine Canoness of Saxony (northwest Germany), wrote in Latin the play Paphnutius in which St. Thaïs appears. Despite the title, she is the principal character of interest. The play, of course, places the story in a European dress and within a medieval European spirituality. Here is St. Paphnutius addressing the abbess of the desert convent, concerning care for their new convert Thaïs:

I have brought you a half-dead little she-goat, recently snatched from the teeth of wolves. I hope that by your compassion [her] shelter will be insured, and that by your care, [she] will be cured, and that having cast aside the rough pelt of a goat she will be clothed with the soft wool of the lamb.

During the European Middle Ages, historical evidence indicates a widespread popularity for the life story of St. Thaïs.

==== Renaissance painting by Ribera ====
During the Renaissance, the Spanish painter Jusepe de Ribera (1591–1652), whose career was spent largely in Naples, produced his composition (above).

=== Modern culture ===
After the distinctive artistic lead of Gustave Flaubert (1821–1880) in his La tentation de Saint Antoine (1874), there eventually followed, in a decidedly more skeptical, yet still historic-religious vein, the French novel Thaïs (1890). This inspired the French opera Thaïs (1894). Later followed the London play Thais (1911), the Hollywood film Thais (1917), and the Franco-Romanian statue Thaïs (1920s).

==== Novel by France ====
France's Thaïs is an historical novel published at Paris in 1891 and written by Anatole France (1844–1924). Thaïs was translated into 18 languages. When France died, "he was almost certainly the most admired author in the Western world", yet since then his approach became dated, and his reputation fell.

Paphnuce is an ascetic hermit of the Egyptian desert, yet he appears to be a fanatic. He determines to convert Thais, a libertine beauty whom he knew as a youth, and journeys to Alexandria to find her. Masquerading as a dandy, he is able to speak with her about eternity; surprisingly he succeeds in converting her to Christianity. Yet on their return to the desert he is troubled and fascinated by her former life. Thaïs enters a convent to repent of her sins, under the care of the elderly nun Albina. Paphnuce returns to his desert hut and fellow cenobites, but encounters emptiness and is haunted by "a little jackal". He rests uneasy and cannot forget the pull of her famous beauty. Later, as she is dying and can only see heaven opening before her, he comes to her side and tells her that her faith is an illusion, and that he loves her.

==== Opera by Massenet ====
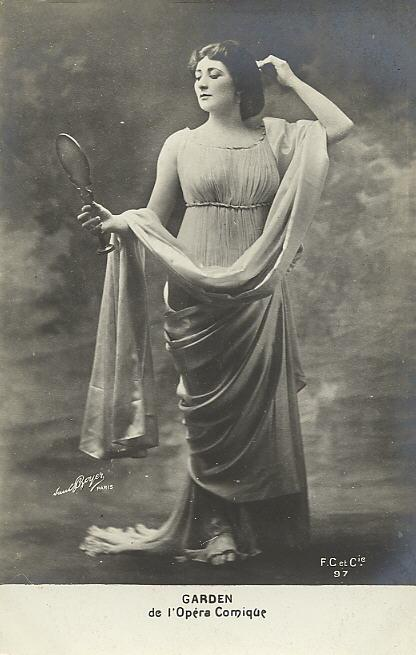
Mary Garden performs in the Massenet opera Thaïs.

Massenet's Thaïs is an opera "comédie lyrique" first performed March 16, 1894, at the Opéra Comique in Paris. The music by Jules Massenet (1842–1912) employs the prose libretto written by Louis Gallet (1835–1898). It draws on the novel by Anatole France. Massenet's music was termed romantic, his being melodic, seductive, poetic, melancholy, "traits of the French lyric theater at its best".

The opera omits the novel's skeptical chapter on the vanity of philosophy. The hermit's name was changed to Athanaël, who is presented with greater sympathy than in the novel. The first duet between Athanaël and Thaïs contrasts his stern accents and her raillery. The last scene's duet shows a reversal of rôles, in which the pious and touching phrases of Thaïs transcend the despairing ardour of Athanaël. Chants of desolation, and later, return of the beautiful violin from an earlier symphonic méditation (first played during the intermezzo when Thaïs had converted) complete the final effect.

==== Play by Wilstach ====
Wilstach's Thais is a play performed at the Criterion Theatre in London, March 14 through April, 1911 (31 performances). Written by the American Paul Wilstach (1870-1952), it starred Constance Collier (1878–1955) playing the title role and Tyrone Power, Sr. (1869–1931) as the hermit. Earlier the play had a trial run in Boston.

==== Film by Goldwyn ====
Goldwyn's Thais is a Hollywood film which featured the operatic soprano Mary Garden (1874–1967). Earlier she had performed the title role in Massenet's opera Thaïs at l'Opéra Comique of Paris. The film, produced by Samuel Goldwyn (1879–1974), also drew on the novel by Anatole France. The film script, however, contains added scenes in which Paphnutius, not yet a monk, encounters Thaïs. These extra scenes occur before the start of France's work of fiction. The film was evidently not considered a success.

Between 1911 and 1917 there were apparently five silent movies entitled Thaïs, made in France, Italy, and America, yet not all followed the saint's story.

==== Ballet: Pavlova, Ashton ====
Meditation from 'Thaïs' is a ballet pas de deux to the music of Jules Massenet. In Anna Pavlova's repertoire of the early 20th century, the piece had been very popular across Europe. Mikhail Mordkin was her dance partner. Later this "oriental dream sequence" was choreographed by Frederick Ashton and performed by Antoinette Sibley and Anthony Dowell at a 1971 benefit gala held at the Adelphi Theatre, London.

==== Sculpture by Chiparus ====
The Thaïs of Chiparus is a bronze and ivory statue depicting a dancing figure, an elegant young woman in 'ancient' dress. It was crafted in France (with a limited production run) during the Art Deco era by the Rumanian artist Demetre Chiparus (1886–1947).

==== The Salt Roads ====
Thais appears as one of three protagonists in Nalo Hopkinson's The Salt Roads (2003).

== See also ==
- Paphnutius
- Paphnutius the Ascetic
- Paphnutius of Thebes
- Anthony the Great
- Dionysius Exiguus
- Hrotsvitha of Gandersheim
