= Bohairic Coptic =

Dialect of the Coptic language

- Region: Egypt
- Ethnicity: Copts
- Era: Liturgical: 11th century to present
- Language family: Afro-Asiatic: Egyptian; Coptic; Bohairic Coptic
- Early forms: Archaic Egyptian: Old Egyptian; Middle Egyptian
- Writing system: Coptic script

Language codes
- ISO 639-3: –
- Glottolog: boha1242

Bohairic is a dialect of the Coptic language, the latest stage of the Egyptian language. Bohairic is attested from the eighth century CE, and has been the chief liturgical language of the Coptic Orthodox Church since the eleventh century.

== Terminology ==
The name Bohairic is derived from the Arabic place name Arabic: وجه بحري, romanized: Wagh Bahari, retained today in Northern Egypt. The written form is generally believed to have originated in the western Nile Delta. Like the other forms of Coptic, Bohairic is usually described as a "dialect". An alternate hypothesis supported by some scholars is that the various forms of Coptic do not represent speech variation but different orthographic traditions.

== History ==
The earliest attestation of Bohairic is in the fourth century, but most texts are from the ninth century and later. Following the Arab conquest of Egypt, Coptic lost ground to Arabic. Various scholars posit different dates for the demise of spoken Coptic, ranging from the eleventh century to the fourteenth century. However, Bohairic has remained in consistent liturgical use through the present in the Coptic Orthodox Church.

Before the tenth century, Sahidic was the form of Coptic with super-regional influence; however, by the eleventh century, Bohairic had become the dominant written form of Coptic throughout Fatimid-ruled Egypt.

In 1858, the Coptic Orthodox Church effected a pronunciation reform under the leadership of ʿIryān Girgis Muftāḥ, a Coptic scholar supported by Pope Cyril IV of Alexandria. This reformed pronunciation is sometimes called 'Greco-Bohairic'.

== Pronunciation ==
=== Church Pronunciations ===
Two systems of pronunciation predominate in the Coptic Orthodox Church today: The 'Greco-Bohairic' pronunciation supported by the Church, and 'Old Bohairic', systematised by Emile Māher Isḥāḳ in his 1975 doctoral thesis. The following table shows general correspondences between the pronunciation systems. Particularly for Old Bohairic much pronunciation is lexeme-specific, so any short list of correspondences is necessarily incomplete:

Grapheme	Greco-Bohairic	Old Bohairic
ⲁ	/a/; ⲁ̀/aː/	/a/
ⲃ	syllable-initial /v/; syllable-final and post-consonantal /b/	/w/; medial /uː/; final and pre-consonantal /b/
ⲅ	before close vowels /g/; before open vowels /ɣ/; before velars /ŋ/	/ʤ/, /g/
ⲇ	/ð/; /d/ in names from Hebrew	/d/
ⲉ	/e/; ⲉ̀/eː/	/a/
ⲍ	/z/	/z/
ⲏ	/iː/; sometimes /i/ when syllable-initial	/iː/, /aː/
ⲑ	/θ/; following ⲥ, ϣ, ⲧ, and m /t/	/t/, /tˤ/, sometimes /d/
ⲓ	word-final /i/, medial /iː/; when followed by other vowels /j/	/i/
ⲕ	/k/	/k/
ⲗ	/l/	/l/
ⲙ	/m/	/m/
ⲛ	/n/	/n/
ⲝ	/ks/	/ks/
ⲟ	word-initial /o/; medial /u/; syllable-final /uː/	/o/, /oː/, /u/, /uː/, /a/
ⲡ	/p/	/b/
ⲣ	/r/	/r/
ⲥ	/s/; the sequence ⲥⲙ is pronounced /zm/	/s/
ⲧ	/t/; before an open vowel /tˤ/; after ⲛ in Greek words /d/	/d/, /dˤ/, /t/, /tˤ/
ⲩ	intervocalic /v/; elsewhere /i/ the sequence ⲟⲩ is /u/, but before consonants /w/	medially /i/ or /iː/; initially /i/; post-vocalic /u/ or /w/
ⲫ	/f/	in most Coptic words /b/; in Greek words and some Coptic words /f/
ⲭ	in Coptic words /k/; in Greek words before closed vowels /ʃ/, before open vowels /x/	in Coptic words /k/; in Greek words /k/, /ʃ/, /x/
ⲯ	/ps/	/bs/
ⲱ	/oː/	/oː/, /o/, /uː/
ϣ	/ʃ/	/ʃ/
ϥ	/f/	/f/
ϧ	/x/	/x/
ϩ	/h/	/h/
ϫ	before closed vowels /ʧ/; before open vowels /ʤ/	/ʤ/
ϭ	/ʧ/	/ʃ/
ϯ	/ti/	/di/

=== Historical Reconstructions ===
James Allen reconstructs the following phonemes for Bohairic:

Consonants
		Labial	Apical	Palatal	Velar	Glottal
Plosive	unaspirated	p	t	tʲ	k	
Plosive	aspirated	pʰ	tʰ	tʲʰ	kʰ	
Fricative		f	s	ʃ	x	h
Nasal		m	n			
Glide		w	l, r	j		ʔ

	Front	Back
Close	ⲉⲓ /i/	ⲟⲩ /u/
Close-mid	ⲏ /e/	ⲱ /o/
Open-mid	ⲉ /ɛ/	ⲟ /ɔ/
Open	ⲁ /a/	

In Allen's reconstruction, in contrast to all other Coptic dialects, Bohairic maintains a strong opposition between aspirated and unaspirated plosives. Both Allen and Loprieno hold that here has been a shift from older Egyptian through which one new aspirated/unaspirated contrast exists: ϭ represents /kʲʰ/ in other dialects, but /tʲʰ/ in Bohairic; it thus alternates with ϫ in aspiration (as opposed to place of articulation, as it does in other dialects). Bohairic, along with Akhmimic, retains the phoneme /x/, which has collapsed into /h/ in other dialects.

Loprieno sees the same series of opposing consonants as Allen, but holds that the unaspirated consonants were articulated as ejectives, while their counterparts carried optional aspiration. Loprieno also holds that ⲃ, ⲇ, and ⲅ held voiced values /b/, /d/, and /g/ respectively, the latter two occurring solely in words borrowed from Greek and in post-nasal position.

Allen considers vowel values to be more difficult to determine, but proposes the following matrix of distinctive features, common to all dialects of Coptic:

	[high]	[low]	[back]	[round]	[tense]
ⲁ	-	+	+	-	-
ⲟ	-	-	+	+	-
ⲱ	-	-	+	+	+
ⲉ	-	-	+	-	-
ⲏ	-	-	+	-	+
ⲟⲩ	+	-	+	+	+
ⲓ	+	-	-	-	+

Allen holds that stress may fall either on the ultimate or penultima. Ⲏ, ⲟ, and ⲱ are always fully stressed, while the other vowels may or may not carry stress. In many cases, stress must be determined from word structure.

== Distinctive Grammatical Features ==
In recent decades, research on Coptic dialect variance has shifted from a phonological focus (as suggested through orthographic practice) to a morphosyntactic one. A few distinctive Bohairic features are listed below:

=== Word Forms and Derivational Morphology ===
- In feminine nouns, where Egyptian -t has become -ⲉ -e in some other dialects, Bohairic has -ⲓ -i.
- Where feminine Egyptian weak verb infinitives have led to Coptic verbs that end in -ⲉ -e in other dialects, this ending is absent in Bohairic.
- Compound nouns where Sahidic uses the linker ⲛ̄- n̩- or ən-, Bohairic uses ⲛ̀ⲧⲉ⸗ ənte-.
- In words borrowed from Greek, where Sahidic often uses the Greek infinitive alone, Bohairic usually precedes it with the verb ⲣ̀- ər- "do".

=== Pronouns ===
- While other dialects may use the independent pronoun ⲥⲉ se as a third-person object pronoun, Bohairic always uses the clitic ⸗ⲟⲩ -u.
- Bohairic regularly uses full first- and second-person forms of pronouns in subject position, as opposed to the common use of reduced forms of pronouns in other dialects.

=== Verb Forms ===
- The conjunctive verbal form is default ⲛ̄- n̩- or ən- in Sahidic, but ⲛ̀ⲧⲉ⸗ ənte- in Bohairic.
- So-called "second" tenses may be used for adverbial predication in Sahidic, but not in Bohairic.
- With prepositional predicates, Bohairic tends to employ the qualitative verb ϫⲙ̀jəm where other dialects allow the prepositional phrase to stand alone.
- Sahidic has a temporal or precursive verbal form ⲛ̄ⲧⲉⲣⲉ- n̩tere- or əntere-. In contexts in which Sahidic uses the temporal, Bohairic employs the second perfect.
- In lieu of the Sahidic future conjunctive, Bohairic uses the first future.

== Sample Text ==
Bohairic Coptic: Ⲉ̀ⲫ̀ⲟⲩⲁⲓ ⲥⲉⲙⲓⲥⲓ ⲣⲉⲙϩⲉⲩ ⲛⲉⲙ ⲉⲧϣⲱϣ ⲉ̀ ⲁⲝⲓⲁ ⲛⲉⲙ ⲇⲓⲕⲁⲓⲟⲥⲩⲛⲏ. Ⲛ̀ⲑⲱⲟⲩ ⲥⲉⲉⲣϩ̀ⲙⲟⲧ ⲅⲛⲱⲙⲏ ⲛⲉⲙ ⲥⲩⲛⲏⲇⲏⲥⲓⲥ ⲟⲩⲟϩ ⲙ̀ⲡⲉⲛⲑⲣⲉⲩⲁⲣϣⲏⲧ ⲙ̀ⲙⲉⲧⲣⲱⲙⲓ ϩⲓⲛⲁ ⲛ̀ⲑⲱⲟⲩ ⲙ̀ⲫ̀ⲣⲏϯ ⲛ̀ⲥ̀ⲛⲏⲟⲩ.

Transliteration: Ephouai semisi remheu nem etshōsh e axia nem dikaiosunē. Enthōou se’erehmot gnōmē nem sunēdēsis ouoh empenthreuarshēt em’metrōmi hina enthōou emephrēti enesnēou.

English: All human beings are born free and equal in dignity and rights. They are endowed with reason and conscience and should act towards one another in a spirit of brotherhood.

== Sources ==
- Allen, James P. (2013). The Ancient Egyptian Language: An Historical Study. Cambridge: Cambridge University Press. ISBN 9781107664678.
- Allen, James P. (2020). Coptic: A Grammar of Its Six Major Dialects. University Park: Eisenbrauns. ISBN 9781646020645.
- Isḥāḳ, Emile Māher (1975). The Phonetics and Phonology of the Bohairic Dialect of Coptic and the Survival of Coptic Words in the Colloquial and Classical Arabic of Egypt and of Coptic Grammatical Constructions in Colloquial Egyptian Arabic (DPhil thesis). Oxford University.
- Loprieno, Antonio (1995). Ancient Egyptian: A linguistic introduction. Cambridge: Cambridge University Press. ISBN 0521448492.
- Loprieno, Antonio; Müller, Matthias (2012). "Ancient Egyptian and Coptic". The Afroasiatic Languages. Cambridge: Cambridge University Press.
- Reintges, Chris H. (2004). Coptic Egyptian (Sahidic Dialect): A Learner's Grammar. Cologne: Rüdiger Köppe Verlag. ISBN 3896455702.
- Toomey, Jeremy (2009). Modern Spoken Coptic and Community Negotiation of Linguistic Authenticity (MA thesis). University of New Mexico.
- Winand, Jean (2015). "Dialects in Pre-Coptic Egyptian, with a Special Attention to Late Egyptian". Lingua Aegyptia. 23: 229–269.
- الراهب أندرياس المقاري (2003). قواعد اللغة القبطية: الجزء الأول. Wadi El Natrun: دير القديس أنبأ مقار. ISBN 9772411622.
