= Paphnutius (play) =

- Written by: Hrotsvitha
- Characters: Thaïs, Paphnutius the Ascetic
- Original language: Latin
- Genre: Scholastic drama
- Setting: Roman Egypt, 4th century AD

Premiere
- Date premiered: unknown (written 10th century AD)
- Place premiered: Germany

Paphnutius or The Conversion of the Harlot Thaïs is a play originally written in Latin by Hrotsvitha of Gandersheim (935–1002). It concerns the relationship between Saint Thaïs, once a courtesan of Alexandria in Roman Egypt, and Paphnutius the Ascetic, the hermit who offered her conversion to Christianity. The characters of the play lived during the 4th century. Much later in Europe, beginning in the Early Middle Ages, the story of St. Thaïs also enjoyed a wide popularity.

Evidently Hrotsvitha employed as a source for her play the Vita Thaisis, a several-centuries-old translation into Latin of the life of Saint Thaïs (the original in Greek). The playwright, a Benedictine Canoness of Saxony (northwest Germany), drawing on the tradition, apparently created a narrative line and a distinctive character for St. Thaïs appropriate to the medieval Christian worldview.

== Play ==
Perhaps unexpectedly, the play begins with a somewhat scholarly dialogue between clerics regarding the harmony inherent in the created world. The subject of concord sets the stage for the drama of the disordered life of the courtesan Thaïs. "She shines forth in wondrous beauty" yet she also "threatens men with foul shame."

In the play Thaïs is presented as someone "who was always eager to accumulate wealth". The saint Paphnutius explains to his disciples that "not only frivolous youth dissipate their families' few possessions on her but even respected men waste their costly treasures by lavishing gifts on her... ." A modern writer observes: "Hrotsvit's Thaïs became a prostitute because of her love of money. The root of her immorality is avarice, which in combination with her great beauty, resulted in her choice of prostitution as a career."

After her conversion to Christianity she "destroys" 400 pounds of gold and burns other articles of treasure before her former patrons. Paphnutius exclaims to Thaïs, "O how you have changed from your prior condition when you burned with illicit passions and were inflamed with greed for possessions!"

The depiction of her conversion, her transition from courtesan to Christian, may appear rather truncated to a modern audience. Afterwards Paphnutius would describe the event to a brother religious: "I visited her, disguised as a lover, secretly, and won over her lascivious mind first with admonitions and flattery, then I frightened her with harsh threats."

Their first meeting is presented in part as follows:

Paphnutius: Isn't there another room where we can converse more privately, one that is hidden away?

Thaïs: There is one so hidden, so secret, that no one besides me knows its inside except for God.

Paphnutius: What God?

Thaïs: The true God.

Paphnutius: Do you believe He knows what we do?

Thaïs: I know that nothing is hidden from His view.

Paphnutius: Do you believe that He overlooks the deeds of the wicked or that He metes out justice as is due?

Thaïs: I believe that He weighs the merits of each person justly in His scale and that each according to his deserts receives reward or travail from Him."

Paphnutius then bluntly condemns her actions as meriting damnation. Thaïs acquiesces to the view of Paphnutius without protest; she becomes anxious. Apparently, she had managed to hide from herself her knowledge of her sin. When Paphnutius confronts her, quickly Thaïs realizes her self-deception. Then she came to hear the discord within her that had caused her unbalanced life, with its disruptive results. She repents.

After entering a process of spiritual transformation, Thaïs tells Paphnutius that "All angels sing His praise and His kindness, because He never scorns the humility of a contrite soul." Thaïs burns her ill-gotten treasures; she then follows Paphnutius into the desert, to a convent where she will live under the guidance of the abbess for several years. There, in solitude, cloistered and penitent, she reviewed in a new light her former life and sought forgiveness.

Paphnutius here, in delivering the newly converted Thaïs to her to the place of her spiritual refuge and retreat, addresses the abbess of the convent in the Egyptian desert, concerning her recent past and her proper care:

"I have brought you a half-dead little she-goat, recently snatched from the teeth of wolves. I hope that by your compassion [her] shelter will be insured, and that by your care, [she] will be cured, and that having cast aside the rough pelt of a goat she will be clothed with the soft wool of the lamb."

Later as death approaches her, Thaïs prays to God: "Thou who didst create me have mercy on me... ." Paphnutius also prays "that Thaïs be resurrected exactly as she was, a human being, and joining the white lambs may enter eternal joys."

== Commentary ==
"The philosophical ideas of harmony throughout creation" presented early in the play oblige us "to interpret the sinfulness of Thaïs not as the triumph of evil but as an imbalance or discord between parts of her created being. Hrotsvit looks at this woman, who acts as a volcano of lust... . What she sees is... the discord of her musica humana of body and soul... . Once Paphnutius has guided Thaïs to actions that bring her body and its behavior into agreement with her knowledge of God" there is "concord between body and soul as the essence of the human being." Hrotsvitha's play is not without subtlety.

== Productions ==
The play was produced in the 1890s by Alfred Jarry's Théâtre des Pantins in a version featuring marionettes.

== See also ==
- Hrotsvitha
- St. Thaïs
- Paphnutius the Ascetic
- Paphnutius the Bishop
- Paphnutius of Thebes
