= Zainiya =

Az-Zainiya الزينيه ⲡⲓⲥⲟⲗⲥⲉⲗ
- Location in Egypt
- Coordinates: 25°41′N 32°40′E
- Country: Egypt
- Governorate: Luxor
- Time zone: UTC+2 (EST)

Az-Zainiya (Arabic: الزينيه, Coptic: ⲡⲓⲥⲟⲗⲥⲉⲗ pi-Solsel "the adornment") is a name given to two villages in the Luxor Governorate, Egypt – az-Zainiya Bahari (Arabic: الزينيه بحري, Coptic: ⲡⲓⲥⲟⲗⲥⲉⲗ ⲡⲉⲙϩⲓⲧ pi-Solsel Pemhit) and az-Zainiya Qibli (Arabic: الزينيه قبلي, Coptic: ⲡⲓⲥⲟⲗⲥⲉⲗ ⲫⲣⲏⲥ pi-Solsel Phres). The two villages were one of the last places where Coptic, the latest stage of the ancient Egyptian language, was spoken, according to 17th-18th century travelers at the time.
