= British Library Coptic Language Collection =

The British Library Coptic Language Collection is a collection of about 1600 manuscripts in the Coptic language dating from 350 to 2000 AD. The collection was one of the first to reach Europe, and the texts are written on papyrus, leather, vellum and paper. The British Library also holds a collection of about 1500 printed books and serials in Coptic.
