= Coptic language =

Latest stage of the Egyptian language

Coptic
- ϯⲙⲉⲧⲣⲉⲙⲛ̀ⲭⲏⲙⲓ (Bohairic) ⲧⲙⲉⲧⲗⲉⲙⲛ̄ⲕⲏⲙⲓ (Fayyumic) ⲧⲙⲛ̄ⲧⲣⲙ̄ⲛ̄ⲕⲏⲙⲉ (Akhmimic) ⲧⲙⲛ̄ⲧⲣⲙ̄ⲛ̄ⲕⲏⲙⲉ (Sahidic)
- Native to: Egypt
- Ethnicity: Copts
- Extinct: late 19th or early 20th century
- Language family: Afro-Asiatic: Egyptian; Coptic
- Early forms: Archaic Egyptian: Old Egyptian; Middle Egyptian; Late Egyptian; Demotic
- Dialects: Bohairic; Fayyumic; Oxyrhynchite; Lycopolitan; Akhmimic; Sahidic
- Writing system: Coptic alphabet

Language codes
- ISO 639-2: cop
- ISO 639-3: cop
- Glottolog: copt1239
- Coptic is an Extinct language according to the classification system of the UNESCO Atlas of the World's Languages in Danger

Coptic (Bohairic Coptic: ϯⲙⲉⲧⲣⲉⲙⲛ̀ⲭⲏⲙⲓ, romanized: Timetremənkʰēmi) is a dormant Afroasiatic language. It is a group of closely related Egyptian dialects, representing the most recent developments of the Ancient Egyptian language, and historically spoken by the Egyptians, starting from the third century AD in Roman Egypt. Coptic was supplanted by Arabic as the primary spoken language of Egypt following the Arab conquest of Egypt and was slowly replaced over the centuries.

Coptic has no modern-day native speakers, and no fluent speakers apart from a number of priests although it remains in daily use as the liturgical language of the Coptic Orthodox Church and of the Coptic Catholic Church. It is written with the Coptic alphabet, a modified uncial form of the Greek alphabet with seven additional letters borrowed from the Demotic Egyptian script.

The major Coptic dialects are Sahidic, Bohairic, Akhmimic, Fayyumic, Lycopolitan (Asyutic), and Oxyrhynchite. Sahidic Coptic was spoken between the cities of Asyut and Oxyrhynchus and flourished as a literary language across Egypt in the period c. 325 – c. 800 AD. The Gnostic texts in the Nag Hammadi library are primarily written in the Sahidic dialect. However, some texts also contain elements of the Subakhmimic (Lycopolitan) dialect, which was also used in Upper Egypt. Bohairic, the dialect of Lower Egypt, gained prominence in the 9th century and is the dialect used by the Coptic Church liturgically.

== Name ==
In Coptic the language is called ϯⲙⲉⲧⲣⲉⲙⲛ̀ⲭⲏⲙⲓ (timetremǹkhēmi) "Egyptian" or ϯⲁⲥⲡⲓ ⲛ̀ⲣⲉⲙⲛ̀ⲭⲏⲙⲓ (tiaspi ǹremǹkhēmi) "the Egyptian language". Coptic also possessed the term ⲅⲩⲡⲧⲓⲟⲥ (gyptios) "Egyptian", derived from Greek Αἰγύπτιος (Aigúptios). This was borrowed into Arabic as قبْط (qibṭ/qubṭ), and from there into the languages of Europe, giving rise to words like French copte, whence the English Copt.

== Geographic distribution ==
Coptic is spoken liturgically in the Coptic Orthodox and Coptic Catholic Church (along with Modern Standard Arabic). The language is spoken only in Egypt and historically has had little influence outside of the territory, except for monasteries located in Nubia (which straddles modern Egypt and Sudan). Coptic's most noticeable linguistic influence has been on the various dialects of Egyptian Arabic, which is characterised by a Coptic substratum in lexical, morphological, syntactical, and phonological features.

== History ==
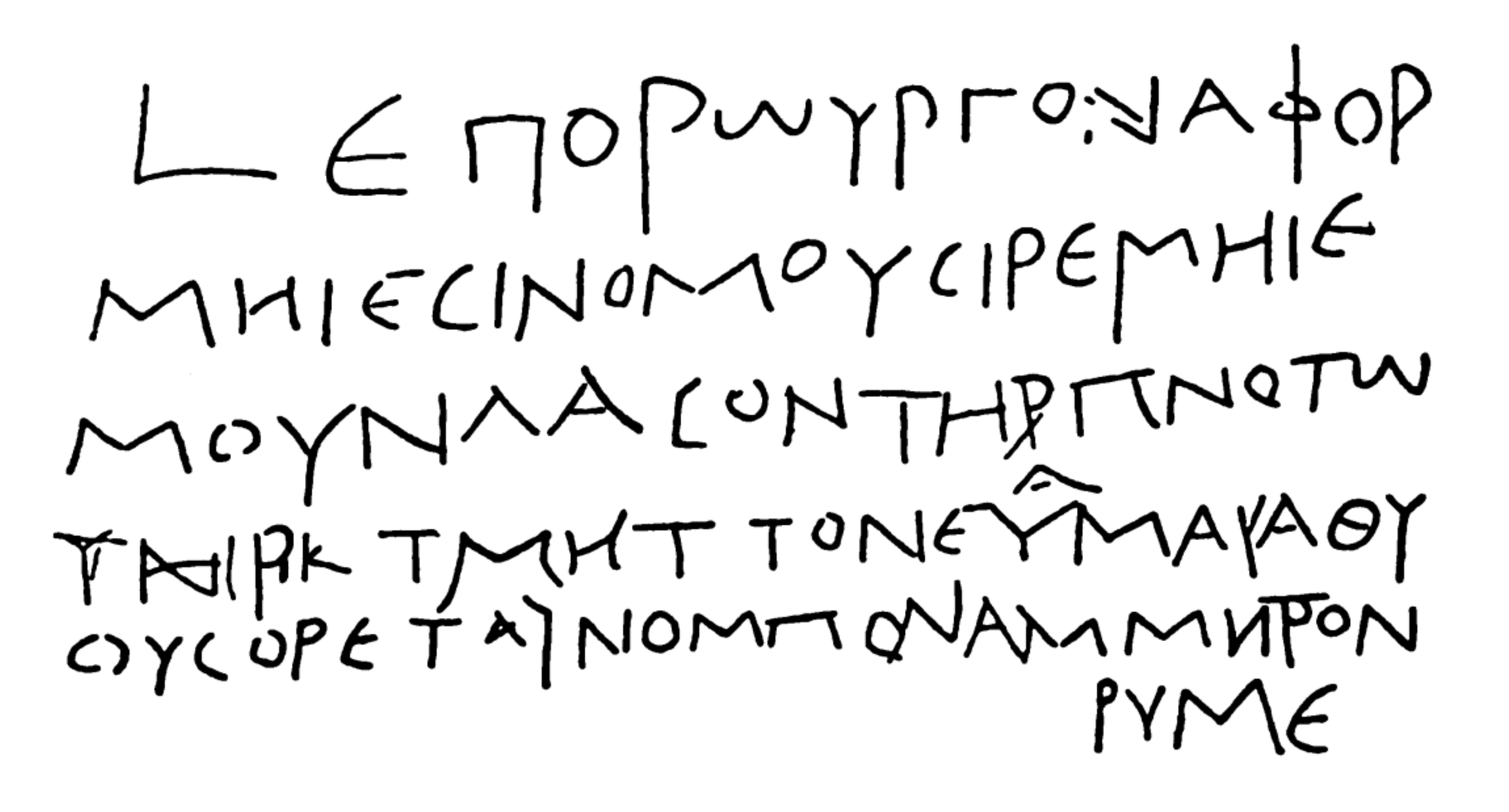
A Demotic graffito in Greek letters from year 5 Horwennefer (200/201 BC).

The Egyptian language may have the longest documented history of any language, from Old Egyptian, which appeared just before 3200 BC, to its final phases as Coptic in the Middle Ages. Coptic belongs to the Later Egyptian phase, which started to be written in the New Kingdom of Egypt. Later Egyptian represented colloquial speech of the later periods. It had analytic features like definite and indefinite articles and periphrastic verb conjugation. Coptic, therefore, is a reference to both the most recent stage of Egyptian after Demotic and the new writing system that was adapted from the Greek alphabet.

=== Pre-Islamic period ===
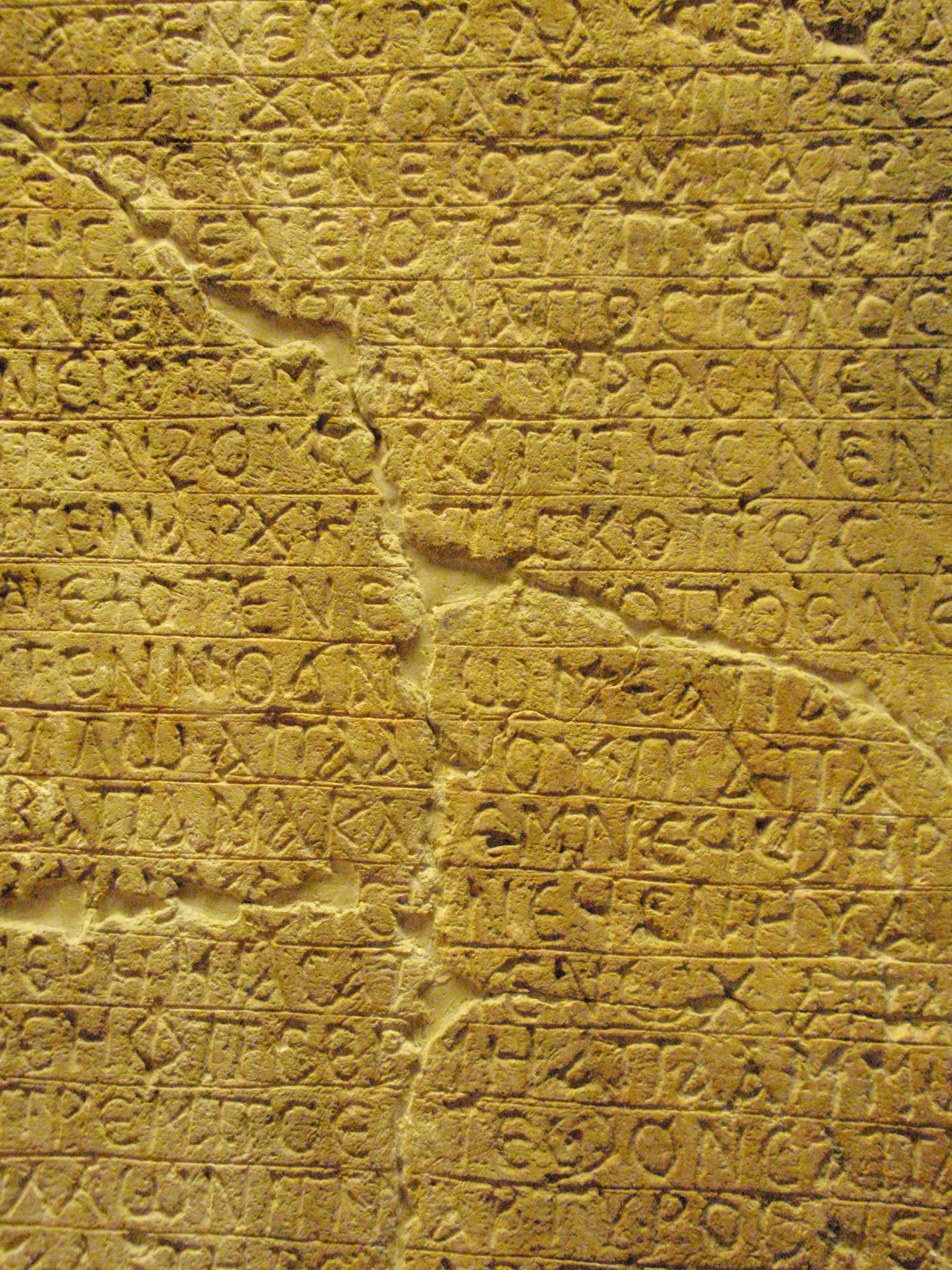
Coptic liturgical inscription from Upper Egypt, dated to the fifth or sixth century.

The earliest attempts to write the Egyptian language using the Greek alphabet are Greek transcriptions of Egyptian proper names, most of which date to the Ptolemaic Kingdom. Scholars frequently refer to this phase as Pre-Coptic. However, it is clear that by the Late Period, Demotic scribes regularly employed a more phonetic orthography, a testament to the increasing cultural contact between Egyptians and Greeks even before Alexander the Great's conquest of Egypt.

Alexander the Great's conquest of Egypt and the subsequent Greek administration of the Ptolemaic Kingdom led to widespread hellenization and Greek-Coptic bilingualism, especially in Lower Egypt, particularly the Nile Delta. This led to the entrance of many Greek loanwords into Coptic, particularly in words relating to technical, legal, commercial, and technological topics.

Efforts to write Coptic in the Greek alphabet probably began in the 1st century BC. The earliest text known is from the 1st century AD. This first phase of written Coptic is called Old Coptic and lasts into the 4th or 5th century. The earliest stage of experimentation with the Egyptian language in the Greek alphabet is often called Pre-Old Coptic or Graeco-Egyptian. Other authors distinguish between early and late Old Coptic.

Old Coptic consists of pagan writings of a magical or divinatory nature. These texts lack the consistent script style and borrowed Greek vocabulary of later Coptic literature, which is entirely Christian or para-Christian (i.e., Gnostic and Manichaean). Some use exclusively Greek letters, with none of the borrowed Demotic Egyptian script of standard Coptic, while others use more Demotic letters than became standard. The production of pagan magical texts written in Egyptian in Greek letters continued into the period of Coptic literature proper.

One traditional theory links the origin of literary Coptic to the Gnostic community in Alexandria. No surviving Coptic manuscript, however, can be linked to Alexandria. Another links it to Christian monasteries and the need to translate Greek teaching into the vernacular. The high proportion of borrowed Greek vocabulary in early Coptic texts, however, makes their practical utility as translations questionable. More recently, it has been suggested that the revival of Egyptian as a literary language (in the form of Coptic) was part of an "effort to revive a national Egyptian culture." Paola Buzi refers to it as an "identity operation", an assertion of distinctness. Conversely, since the rise of the Coptic writing system paralleled the rise of Christianity, it may have been stimulated by the desire to distance itself from the pagan associations of traditional Egyptian writing.

Literary Coptic first appears in the 3rd century. The earliest literary texts are translations of Greek texts, either Christian or Gnostic. The five literary texts dated to the 3rd century are all biblical, either marginal annotations to Greek bibles or bilingual Greek–Coptic biblical texts. There is a single documentary text, a private letter on an ostracon, dated to this century.

=== Islamic period ===
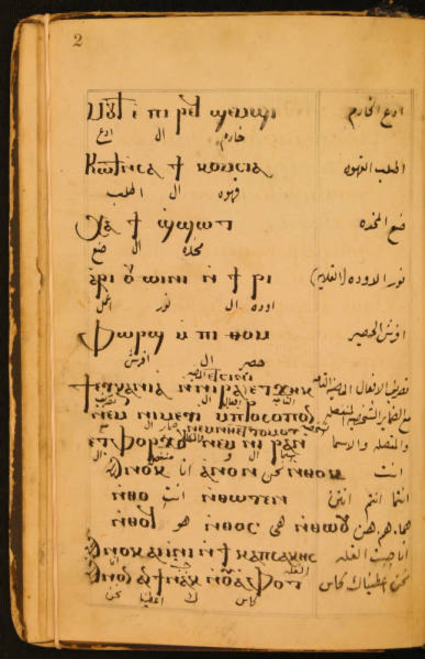
Page from a 19th-century Coptic-language grammar

The Arab conquest of Egypt brought the spread of Islam in the seventh century. At the turn of the eighth century, Abd al-Malik ibn Marwan, the Umayyad caliph, decreed that Arabic replace Koine Greek as the sole administrative language. Literary Coptic gradually declined, and within a few hundred years, Egyptian bishop Severus ibn al-Muqaffa found it necessary to write his History of the Patriarchs in Arabic. However, ecclesiastically the language retained an important position, and many hagiographic texts were also composed during this period. Until the 10th century, Coptic remained the spoken language of the native population outside the capital.

The Coptic language massively declined under the hands of al-Hakim bi-Amr Allah, the Fatimid caliph, as part of his campaigns of religious persecution. Emile Maher Ishaq, a noted Coptologist, writes in the Coptic Encyclopedia that al-Hakim bi-Amr Allah issued strict orders completely prohibiting the use of Coptic anywhere, whether in schools, public streets, and even within family homes. Those who did not comply were liable to have their tongues removed. Oral traditions of the Coptic Church tell of removed tongues left on the street or in a public square to intimidate and warn against speaking Coptic.

As a literary language, Arabic began to slowly replace Coptic among native Egyptians in the 10th century and likely became the most used literary language between the 11th or 12th centuries; with the last known literary work written in Coptic dating to the late 14th century.

As a primary spoken language, Coptic was the majority language in Egypt until sometime between the 10th and 12th centuries, and then survived as a minority primary language until at least the 17th century. The language may have survived in isolated pockets in Upper Egypt as late as the 19th century. In the village of Zainiya (pi-Solsel) north of Luxor, passive speakers over 50 years old were recorded as late as the 1930s, and traces of traditional vernacular Coptic were reported to exist in other places such as Abydos and Dendera.

From the medieval period, there are two known examples of tarsh-printed Coptic. The fragmentary amulet A.Ch. 12.145 of Austrian National Library, and the more intact University of Utah, Or. P.1563r containing a frame of Coptic text around an Arabic main text.

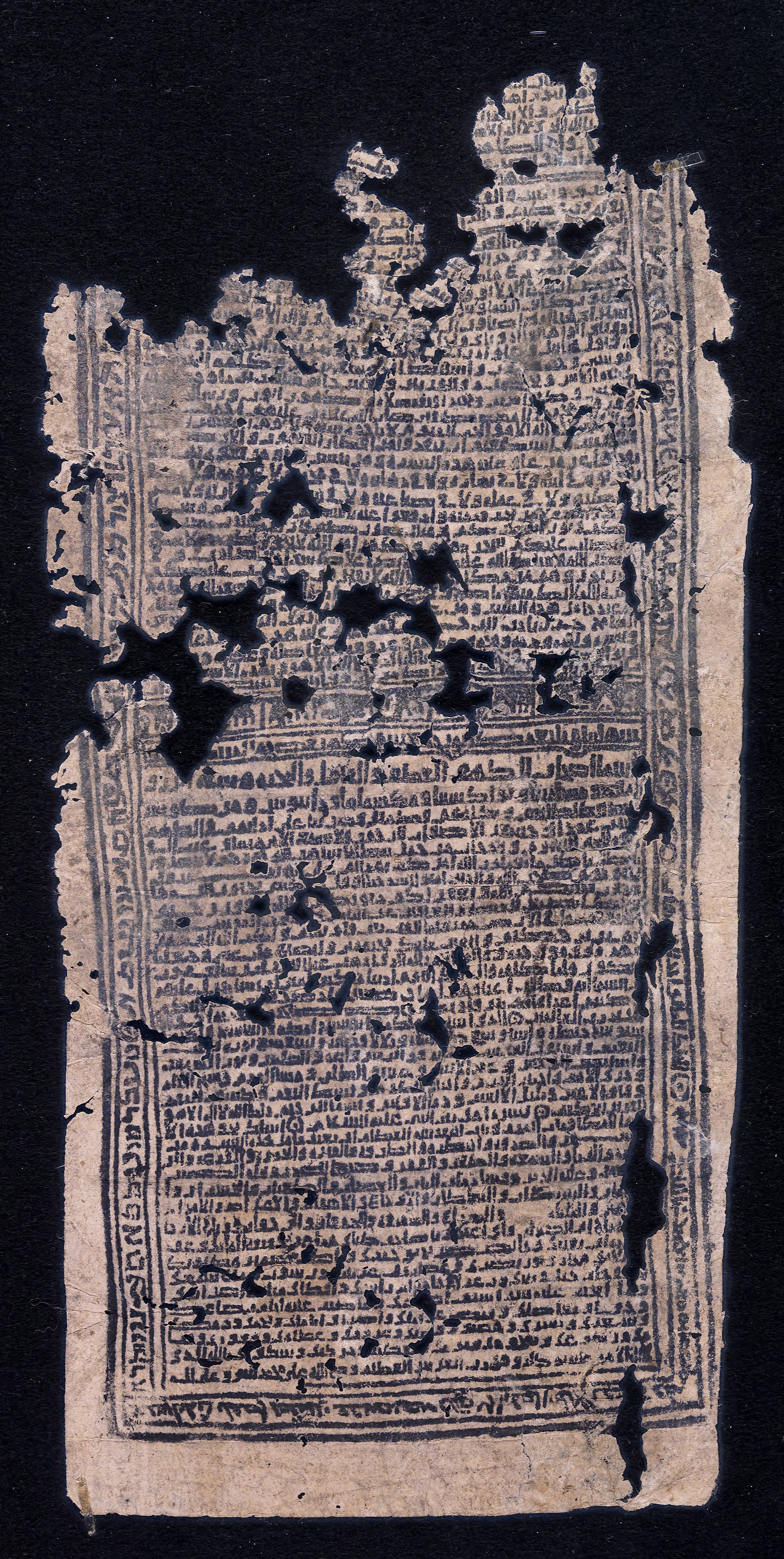

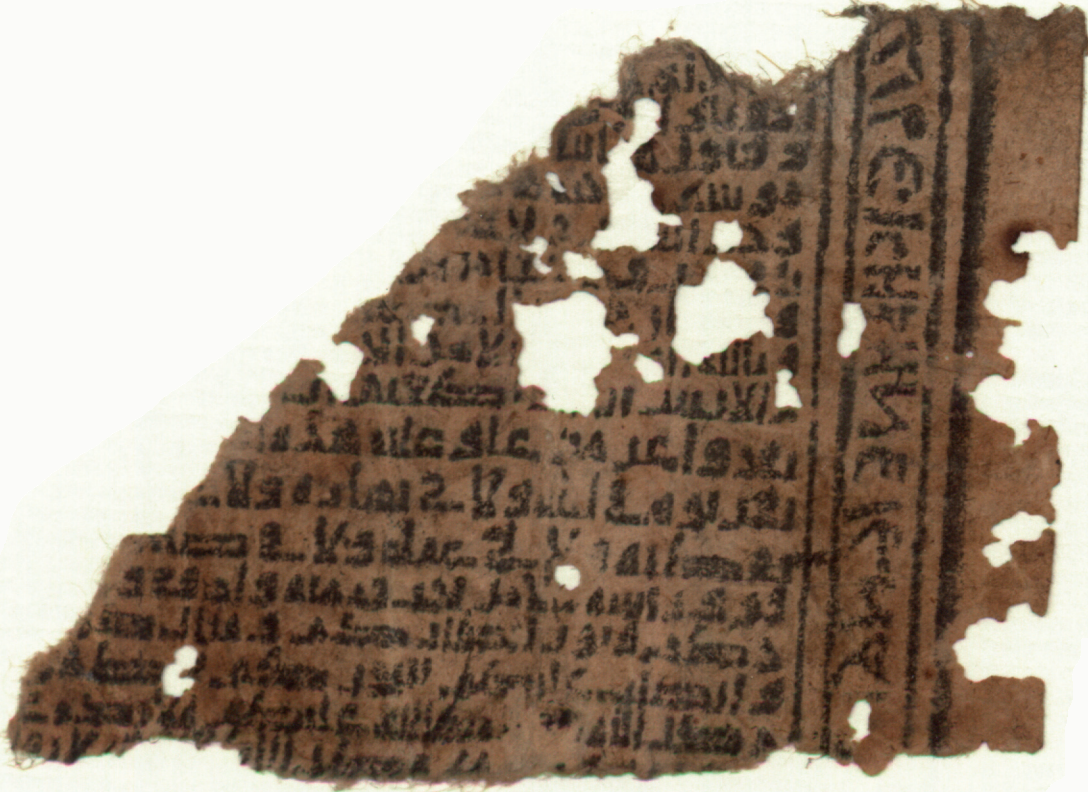
A fragmented copy, made using the same print block, in which only the Coptic border of the top right is visible.

Quadrilingual amulets about the Seven Sleepers. The main body in Arabic, with Hebrew, Syriac and Coptic on the borders. Also contains a quote of Surah At-Tawbah:129 13th Century

=== Modern revitalisation attempts ===
In the early 20th century, some Copts tried to revive the Coptic language, but they were unsuccessful.

In the second half of the 20th century, Pope Cyril VI of Alexandria started a national Church-sponsored movement to revive Coptic. Several works of grammar were published, including a more comprehensive dictionary than had been formerly available. The scholarly findings of the field of Egyptology and the inauguration of the Institute of Coptic Studies further contributed to the renaissance. Efforts at language revitalisation continue to be undertaken, and have attracted the interest of Copts and linguists in and outside of Egypt.

== Dialects ==
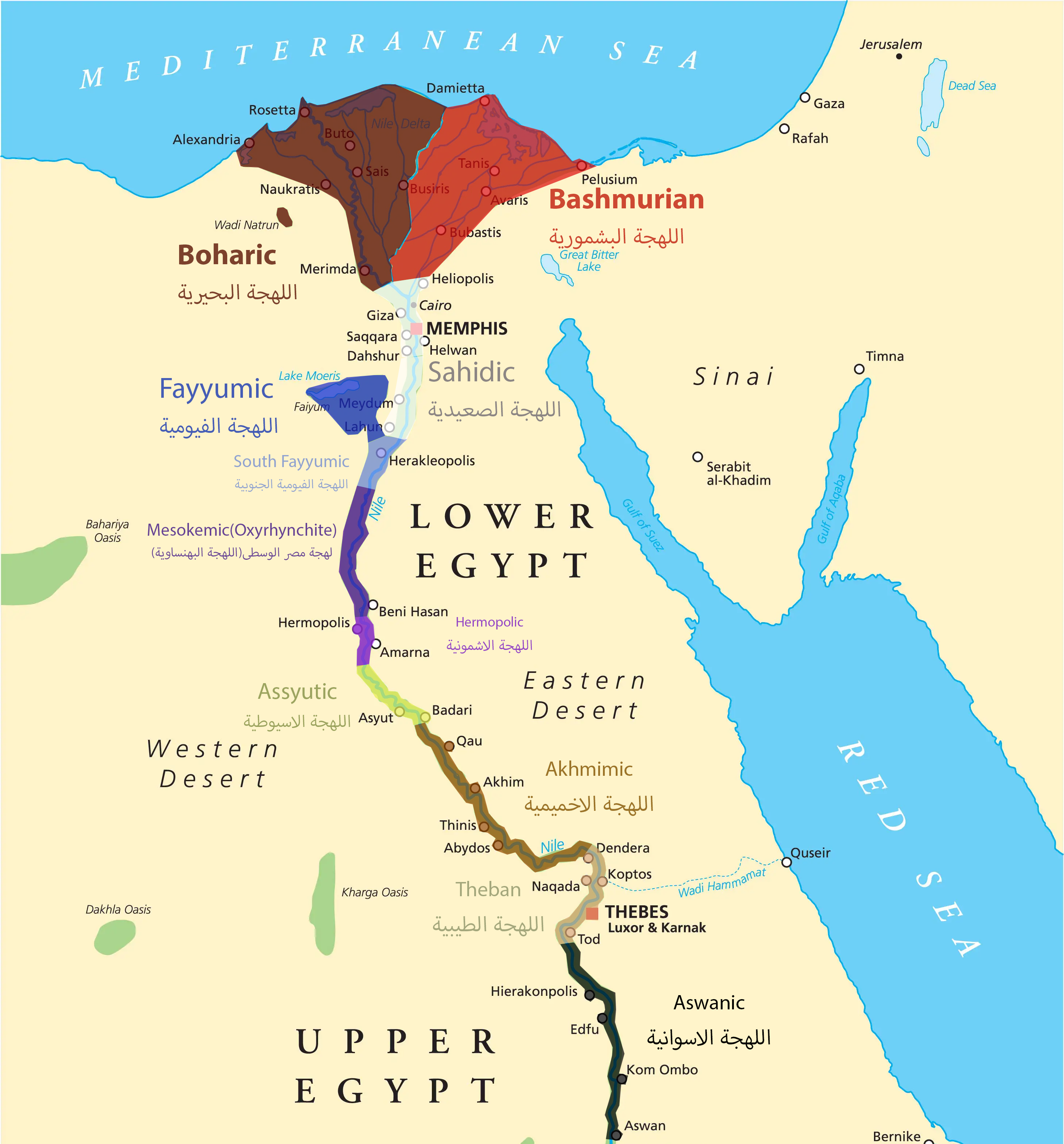
Historical Coptic dialects in Egypt

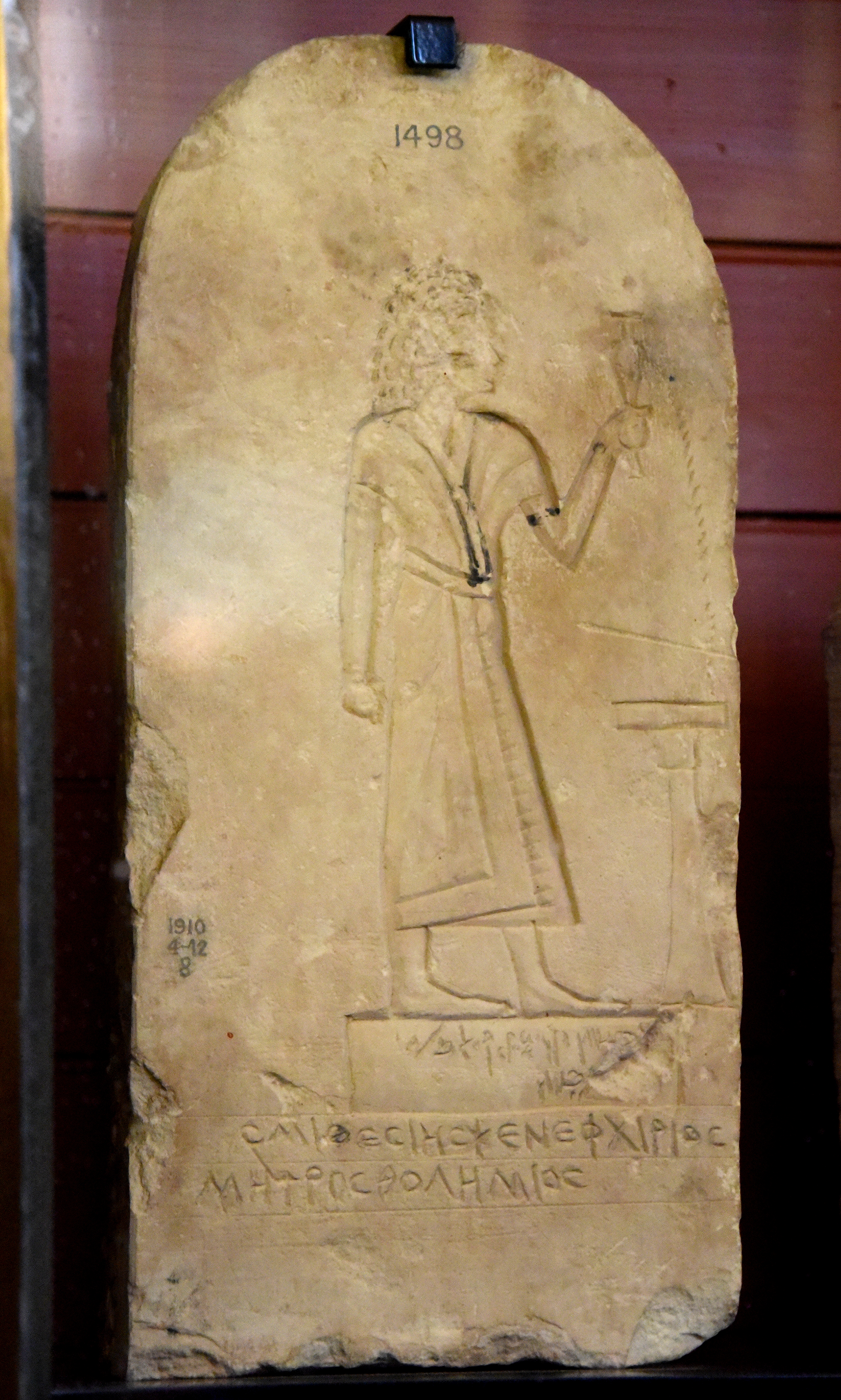
Sandstone stela, inscribed with Coptic text. The names Phoibammon and Abraham appear. From Egypt, unknown finding place. The British Museum, London

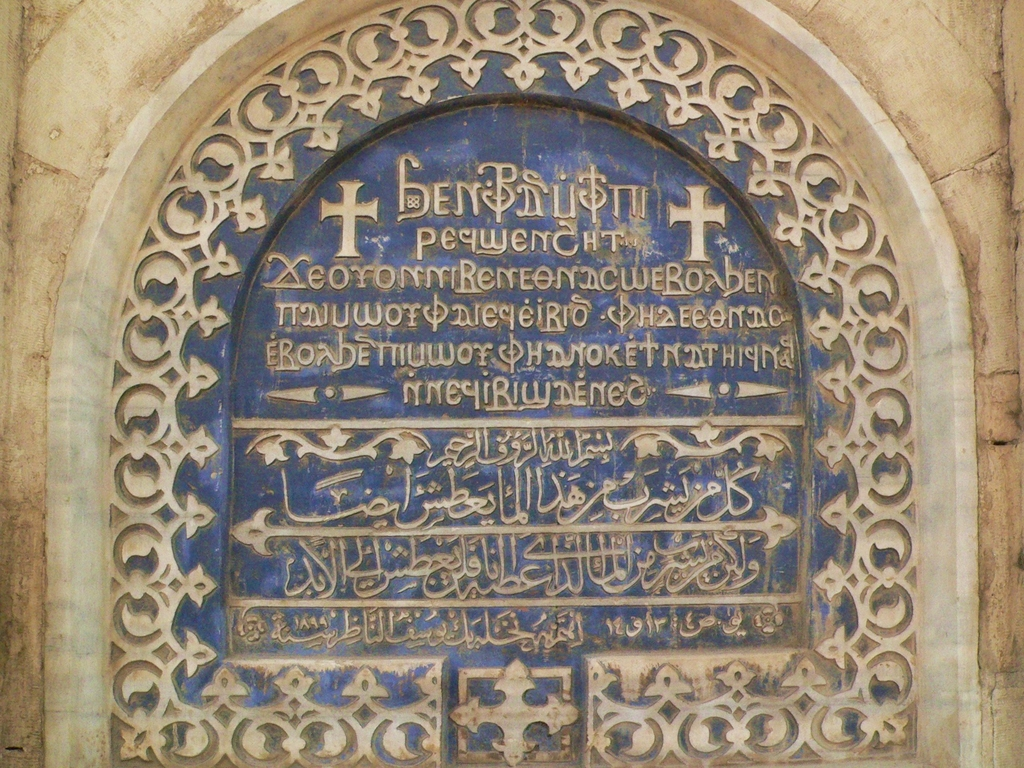
Coptic and Arabic inscriptions in an Old Cairo church

There is little written evidence of dialectal differences in the pre-Coptic phases of the Egyptian language due to the centralised nature of the political and cultural institutions of ancient Egyptian society. However, literary Old and Middle (Classical) Egyptian represent the spoken dialect of Lower Egypt around the city of Memphis, the capital of Egypt in the Old Kingdom. Later Egyptian is more representative of the dialects spoken in Upper Egypt, especially around the area of Thebes as it became the cultural and religious center of the New Kingdom.

Coptic more obviously displays a number of regional dialects that were in use from the coast of the Mediterranean Sea in northern Egypt, south into Nubia, and in the western oases. However, while many of these dialects reflect actual regional linguistic (namely phonological and some lexical) variation, they mostly reflect localized orthographic traditions with very little grammatical differences.

=== Lower Egyptian dialects ===
==== Bohairic ====
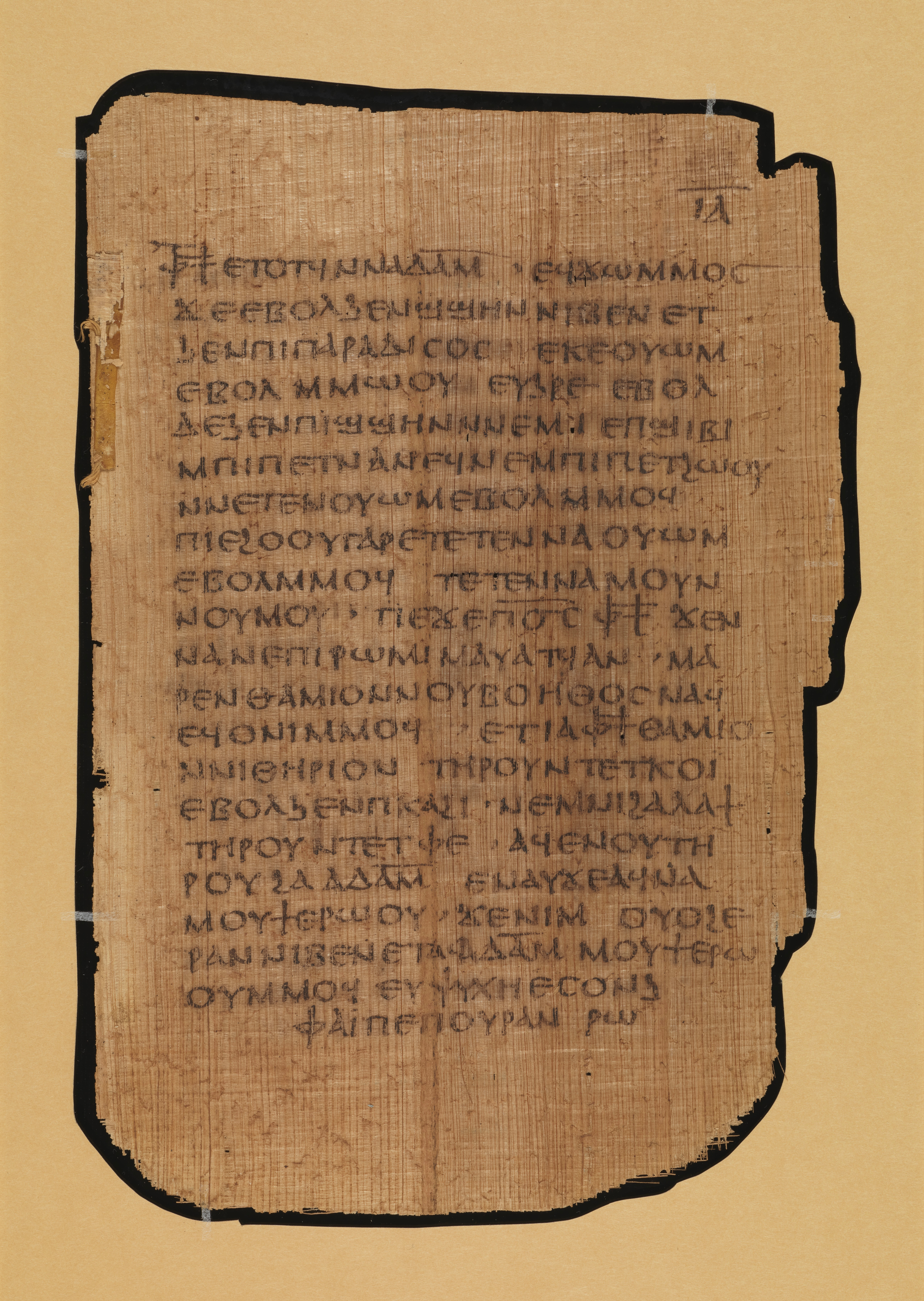
Papyrus Bodmer III is an early Bohairic manuscript containing the Gospel of John and parts of Genesis

The Bohairic (also known as Memphitic) dialect originated in the western Nile Delta. The earliest Bohairic manuscripts date to the 4th century, but most texts come from the 9th century and later; this may be due to poor preservation conditions for texts in the humid regions of northern Egypt. It shows several conservative features in lexicon and phonology not found in other dialects. Bohairic is the dialect used as the liturgical language of the modern Coptic Orthodox Church, replacing Sahidic some time in the eleventh century. In contemporary liturgical use, there are two traditions of pronunciation, arising from successive reforms in the 19th and 20th centuries (see Coptic pronunciation reform). Modern revitalisation efforts are based on this dialect.

Bashmuric (also known as Mansurian, Dialect G, and Bashmurian) was a sub-dialect of Bohairic most likely spoken in Eastern Delta. Its main characteristic is using solely Greek letters to represent Coptic phonemes.

=== Upper Egyptian dialects ===
==== Sahidic ====
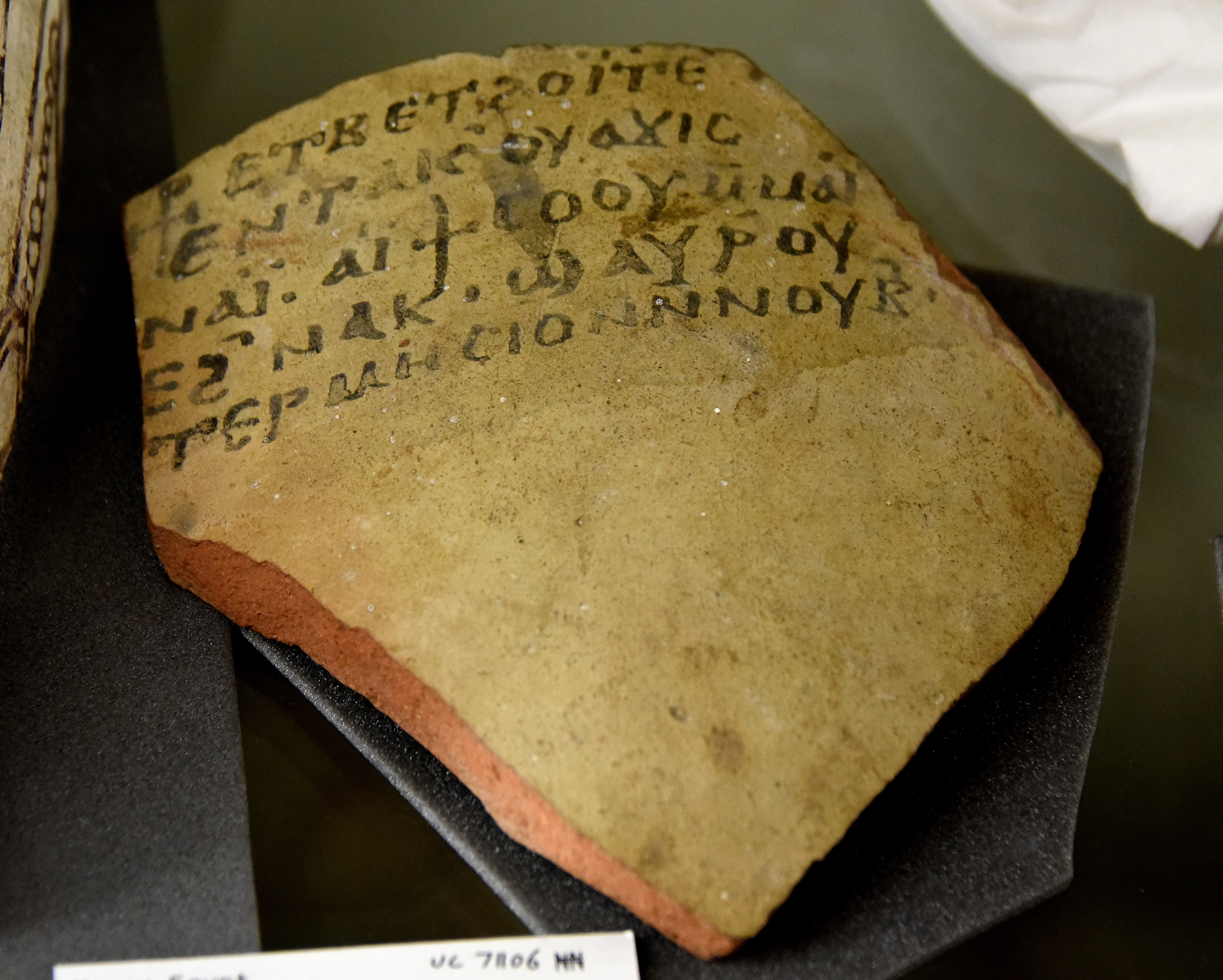
Pottery shard inscribed with 5 lines in Coptic Sahidic. Byzantine period, 6th century AD. From Thebes, Egypt. The Petrie Museum of Egyptian Archaeology, London

Sahidic (also known as Thebaic or Theban) is the dialect in which most known Coptic texts are written, and was the leading dialect in the pre-Islamic period. Where it was spoken is a matter of debate; its name comes from an Arabic term Aṣ-ṣa'id meaning Upper [Southern] Egypt would imply it was spoken there, but Sahidic's features seem to suggest it was spoken in the north. It is also possible that Sahidic was the urban dialect spoken in the major urban centers of Thebes and Memphis differentiating it from the other rural dialects. Around 300 it began to be written in literary form, including translations of major portions of the Bible (see Coptic versions of the Bible). By the 6th century, a standardised spelling had been attained throughout Egypt. Almost all native authors wrote in this dialect of Coptic. Sahidic was, beginning in the 9th century, challenged by Bohairic, but is attested as late as the 14th.

While texts in other Coptic dialects are primarily translations of Greek literary and religious texts, Sahidic is the only dialect with a considerable body of original literature and non-literary texts. Because Sahidic shares most of its features with other dialects of Coptic with few peculiarities specific to itself, and has an extensive corpus of known texts, it is generally the dialect studied by learners of Coptic, particularly by scholars outside of the Coptic Church.

==== Proto-Theban ====
Proto-Theban is a dialect of Coptic only attested in a single source, as such information on it is limited but; Proto-Theban closely resembles what reconstructed Proto-Sahidic dialect would have looked like. The variant of the Coptic script used in its singular attestation is also distinct as it contains 10 letters from the Demotic Script which is significantly higher than other dialects.

==== Fayyumic ====
Fayyumic (also known as Crocodilopolic; in older works it is often called Bashmuric) was spoken primarily in the Faiyum west of the Nile Valley. It is attested from the 3rd to the 10th centuries. It is most notable for writing ⲗ (which corresponds to /l/), where other dialects generally use ⲣ /r/ (probably corresponding to a flap [ɾ]). In earlier stages of Egyptian, the liquids were not distinguished in writing until the New Kingdom, when Late Egyptian became the administrative language. Late Egyptian orthography utilised a grapheme that combined the graphemes for /r/ and /n/ in order to express /l/. Demotic for its part indicated /l/ using a diacritic variety of /r/.

==== South Fayyumic ====
South Fayyumic (also called Dialect V) was spoken around modern towns of Beni Suef and Bush and is distinguished from central Fayyumic by not having lambdacism.

==== Ashmuninic ====
Ashmuninic (also known as Hermopolic or Dialect H) was spoken around the city of Shmun and shares South Fayyumic features like vowel gemination and absence of lambdacism.

==== Oxyrhynchite ====
Oxyrhynchite (also known as Mesokemic or, confusingly, Middle Egyptian) is the dialect of Oxyrhynchus and surrounding areas. It shows similarities with Fayyumic and is attested in manuscripts from the fourth and fifth centuries.

==== Lycopolitan ====
Lycopolitan (also known as Subakhmimic and Assiutic) is a dialect closely related to Akhmimic in terms of when and where it was attested, but manuscripts written in Lycopolitan tend to be from the area of Asyut. The main differences between the two dialects seem to be graphic in nature. The Lycopolitan variety was used extensively for translations of Gnostic and Manichaean works, including the texts of the Nag Hammadi library.

==== Akhmimic ====
Akhmimic (also called Chemmic or Panopolic) was the dialect of the area around the town of Akhmim (Ancient Greek: Πανὸς πόλις, romanized: Panopolis). It flourished during the fourth and fifth centuries, after which no writings are attested. Akhmimic is phonologically the most archaic of the Coptic dialects. One characteristic feature is the retention of the phoneme /x/, which is realised as /ʃ/ in most other dialects.

==== Aswanic ====
Aswanic (also known as Syenic) was the dialect of the area around the town of Aswan. It is very close to Akhmimic, and sometimes considered a sub-dialect, although, what makes it different is that "ϩ" is written before pronouns, for example in standard Coptic it is said Afso, which means drank, but in the Aswanic dialect it is said Hafso. It also has a distinctive way of writing; so the letter "ⲃ" is written instead of the letter "ϥ".

== Phonology ==
Coptic provides the clearest indication of Later Egyptian phonology from its writing system, which fully indicates vowel sounds and occasionally stress patterns. The phonological system of Later Egyptian is also better known than that of the Classical phase of the language because of a greater number of sources indicating Egyptian sounds, including cuneiform letters containing transcriptions of Egyptian words and phrases, and Egyptian renderings of Northwest Semitic names. Coptic sounds, in addition, are known from a variety of Coptic-Arabic papyri in which Arabic letters were used to transcribe Coptic and vice versa. They date to the medieval Islamic period, when Coptic was still spoken.

=== Vowels ===
There are some differences of opinion among Coptic language scholars on the correct phonetic interpretation of the writing system of Coptic. Differences centre on how to interpret the pairs of letters ⲉ/ⲏ and ⲟ/ⲱ. In the Attic dialect of Ancient Greek in the 5th century BC, the first member of each pair is a short closed vowel /e, o/, and the second member is a long open vowel /ɛː, ɔː/. In some interpretations of Coptic phonology, it is assumed that the length difference is primary, with ⲉ/ⲏ /e, eː/ and ⲟ/ⲱ is /o, oː/. Other scholars argue for a different analysis in which ⲉ/ⲏ and ⲟ/ⲱ are interpreted as /e, ɛ/ and /o, ɔ/.

These two charts show the two theories of Coptic vowel phonology:

Monophthong phonemes (length theory)
	Front	Central	Back
Close	iː		uː
Close-mid	eː e		oː o
Mid		ə	
Open			ɑ

Monophthong phonemes (vowel quality theory)
	Front	Central	Back
Close	iː		uː
Close-mid	e		o
Mid	ɛ	ə	ɔ
Open			ɑ

Dialects vary in their realisation. The difference between [o] and [u] seems to be allophonic. Evidence is not sufficient to demonstrate that these are distinct vowels, and if they are, the difference has a very low functional load. For dialects that use orthographic ⟨ⲉⲓ⟩ for a single vowel, there appears to be no phonetic difference from ⟨ⲓ⟩.

Double orthographic vowels are presumed here to be long, but there is considerable debate as to whether these double vowels represent long vowels or glottal stops.

Bohairic vowels
	Front	Back
Close	ⲉⲓ /i/	ⲟⲩ /u/
Close-mid	ⲏ /e/	ⲱ /o/
Open-mid	ⲉ /ɛ/	ⲟ /ɔ/
Open	ⲁ /a/	

Sahidic vowels
	Front	Back
Close	ⲉⲓ /i/	ⲟⲩ /u/
Close-mid	ⲏ /e/ ⲏⲏ /eː/	ⲱ /o/ ⲱⲱ /oː/
Open-mid	ⲉ /ɛ/ ⲉⲉ /ɛː/	ⲟ /ɔ/ ⲟⲟ /ɔː/
Open	ⲁ /a/ ⲁⲁ /aː/	

Lycopolitan vowels
	Front	Back
Close	ⲉⲓ /i/	ⲟⲩ /u/
Close-mid	ⲏ /e/ ⲏⲏ /eː/	ⲱ /o/ ⲱⲱ /oː/
Open-mid	ⲉ /ɛ/ ⲉⲉ /ɛː/	ⲟⲟ /ɔː/
Open	ⲁ /a/ ⲁⲁ /aː/	

Akhmimic vowels
	Front	Back
Close	ⲉⲓ /i/ ⲓⲉⲓ /iː/	ⲟⲩ /u/ ⲟⲩⲟⲩ /uː/
Close-mid	ⲏ /e/	ⲱ /o/
Open-mid	ⲉ /ɛ/ ⲉⲉ /ɛː/	ⲟⲟ /ɔː/ (Note: Frequent spelling of this vowel as ⲱⲱ indicates that it is in free variation with [[oː]].)
Open	ⲁ /a/ ⲁⲁ /aː/	

There is no length distinction in final stressed position, but only those vowels that occur long appear there: ⟨(ⲉ)ⲓ, ⲉ, ⲁ, ⲟ~ⲱ, ⲟⲩ⟩.

In Sahidic, the letter ⲉ was used for short /e/ before back fricatives, and also for unstressed schwa /ə/. It's possible there was also a distinction between short /ɛ/ and /a/, but if so the functional load was extremely low.

Bohairic did not have long vowels. /i/ was only written ⟨ⲓ⟩. As above, it's possible that /u/ and /o/ were distinct vowels rather than just allophones.

In Late Coptic (that is, Late Bohairic), the vowels were reduced to those found in Egyptian Arabic, /a, i, u/. ⟨ⲱ, ⲟ⟩ became /u/, ⟨ⲉ⟩ became /æ/, and ⟨ⲏ⟩ became either /ɪ/ or /æ/. It is difficult to explain ⟨ⲏ⟩. However, it generally became /æ/ in stressed monosyllables, /ɪ/ in unstressed monosyllables, and in polysyllables, /æ/ when followed by /i/, and /ɪ/ when not.

There were no doubled orthographic vowels in Mesokemic. Some representative correspondences with Sahidic are:

Sahidic stressed vowels	ⲁ	ⲁⲁ, ⲉⲉ	ⲏ	ⲟ	ⲱ	ⲱⲱ
Mesokemic equivalent	ⲉ	ⲏ	ⲏ	ⲁ	ⲟ	ⲱ

It is not clear if these correspondences reflect distinct pronunciations in Mesokemic, or if they are an imitation of the long Greek vowels ⟨η, ω⟩.

=== Consonants ===
As with the vowels, there are differences of opinion over the correct interpretation of the Coptic consonant letters, particularly with regard to the letters ϫ and ϭ. ϫ is transcribed as ⟨j⟩ in many older Coptic sources and ϭ as ⟨ɡ⟩ or ⟨č⟩. Lambdin (1983) notes that the current conventional pronunciations are different from the probable ancient pronunciations: Sahidic ϫ was probably pronounced [tʲ] and ϭ was probably pronounced [kʲ]. Reintges (2004, p. 22) suggests that ϫ was pronounced [tʃ].

Beside being found in Greek loanwords, the letters ⟨φ, θ, χ⟩ were used in native words for a sequence of /p, t, k/ plus /h/, as in ⲑⲉ = ⲧ-ϩⲉ "the-way" (f.sg.) and ⲫⲟϥ = ⲡ-ϩⲟϥ "the-snake" (m.sg). The letters did not have this use in Bohairic, which used them for single sounds.

Coptic consonants
		Labial	Alveolar		Palatal	Velar		Glottal
Nasal		m ⟨ⲙ⟩	n ⟨ⲛ⟩					
Obstruent	aspirate (Note: The aspirate series is present only in Bohairic.)	pʰ ⟨ⲫ⟩	tʰ ⟨ⲑ⟩		t͡ʃʰ ⟨ϭ⟩ (Note: The letter ϭ has two values: In Bohairic it represents /t͡ʃʰ/, the aspirated counterpart to ϫ /t͡ʃ/. In the other dialects it represents /kʲ/, the palatalized counterpart to ⲕ /k/.)	kʰ ⟨ⲭ⟩		
Obstruent	tenuis	p ⟨ⲡ⟩	t ⟨ⲧ⟩		t͡ʃ ⟨ϫ⟩	kʲ ⟨ϭ⟩	k ⟨ⲕ⟩	
Obstruent	fricative	f ⟨ϥ⟩	s ⟨ⲥ⟩		ʃ ⟨ϣ⟩	xʲ ⟨ⳋ ⳃ⟩ (Note: /xʲ/ is present only in the minor Coptic dialects P and I, where it is written ⟨ⳋ⟩ and ⟨ⳃ⟩ respectively.)	x ⟨ϧ ⳉ⟩ (Note: /x/ is written ⟨ϧ⟩ in Bohairic and Dialect P, and ⟨ⳉ⟩ in Akhmimic and Dialect I.)	h ⟨ϩ⟩
Approximant		v ⟨ⲃ⟩ (Note: Coptic ⲃ is alternatively interpreted as a voiced bilabial fricative [β]. Like the other voiced consonants, it belongs to the class of sonorants and may occupy the syllable nucleus (cf. Sahidic: ⲧⲃ̄ⲧ /tv̩t/ "fish").)	r ⟨ⲣ⟩	l ⟨ⲗ⟩	j ⟨ⲉⲓ⟩	w ⟨ⲟⲩ⟩		

It is possible that Coptic has a glottal stop, [ʔ], though there is no definitive evidence. Supporters of this theory have posited that the glottal stop was represented with ⲁ word-initially, with ⲓ word-finally in monosyllabic words in northern dialects, and ⲉ in monosyllabic words in Akhmimic and Assiutic. In Sahidic, it has been postulated that it represented the second of a doubled vowel.

In Late Coptic (ca. 14th century), Bohairic sounds that did not occur in Egyptian Arabic were lost. A possible shift from a tenuis-aspirate distinction to voiced-tenuis is only attested from the alveolars, the only place that Arabic has such a contrast.

Late Coptic consonants
Original pronunciation	Late pronunciation
β	w (final [b])
p	b
pʰ	b ~ f
t	d
tʰ	d
t͡ʃ	ɟ (Note: [ɟ] is the local equivalent of Cairene [ɡ].)
t͡ʃʰ	ʃ
k	k
kʰ	k

Earlier phases of Egyptian may have contrasted voiceless and voiced bilabial plosives, but the distinction seems to have been lost. Late Egyptian, Demotic and Coptic all interchangeably use their respective graphemes to indicate either sound; for example, Coptic for 'iron' appears alternately as ⲡⲉⲛⲓⲡⲉ, ⲃⲉⲛⲓⲡⲉ and ⲃⲓⲛⲓⲃⲉ. That probably reflects dialect variation. Both letters were interchanged with ⲫ and ϥ to indicate /f/, and ⲃ was also used in many texts to indicate the bilabial approximant /w/. Coptologists believe that Coptic ⲃ was articulated as a voiced bilabial fricative [β]. In the present-day Coptic Church services, this letter is realised as /v/, but it is almost certainly a result of the pronunciation reforms instituted in the 19th century.

Whereas Old Egyptian contrasts /s/ and /z/, the two sounds appear to be in free variation in Coptic, as they were since the Middle Egyptian period. However, they are contrasted only in Greek loans; for example, native Coptic ⲁⲛⲍⲏⲃ (anzēb) and ⲁⲛⲥⲏⲃⲉ (ansēbə) 'school' are homophonous. Other consonants that sometimes appear to be either in free variation or to have different distributions across dialects are [t] and [d], [ɾ] and [l] (especially in the Fayyumic dialect, a feature of earlier Egyptian) and [k] and [ɡ], with the voiceless stop consonants being more common in Coptic words and the voiced ones in Greek borrowings. Apart from the liquid consonants, this pattern may indicate a sound change in Later Egyptian, leading to a neutralisation of voiced alveolar and velar plosives. When the voiced plosives are realised, it is usually the result of consonant voicing in proximity to /n/.

A few early manuscripts have a letter ⳋ or ⳃ ç where Sahidic and Bohairic have ϣ š. and Akhmimic has ⳉ x. This sound seems to have been lost early on.

== Writing system ==
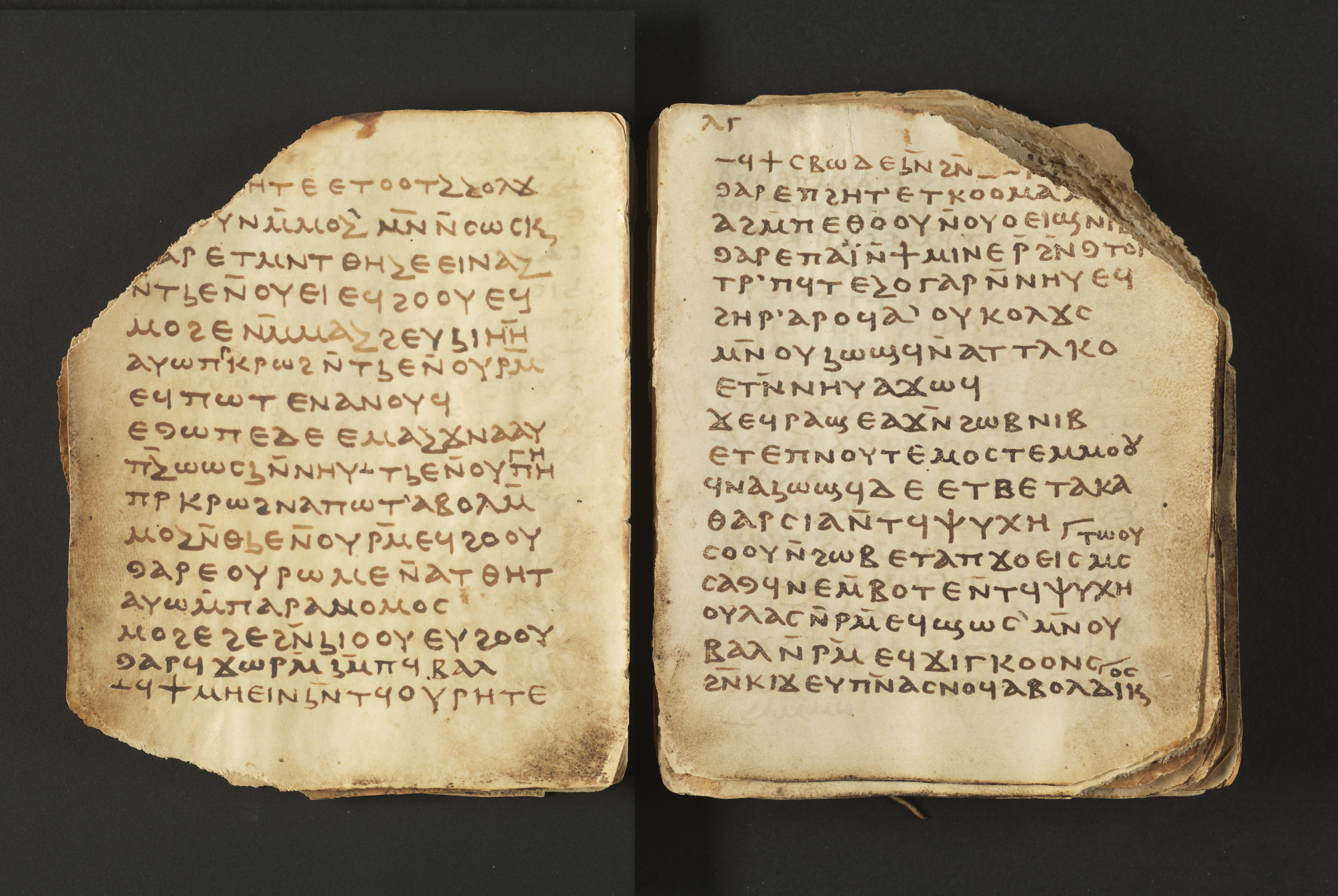
Papyrus Bodmer VI ("Dialect P") possesses the richest of all Coptic alphabets, with 35 unique graphemes.

Coptic uses a writing system almost wholly derived from the Greek alphabet, with the addition of a number of letters that have their origins in Demotic Egyptian. This is comparable to the Latin-based Icelandic alphabet, which includes the runic letter thorn. There is some variation in the number and forms of these signs depending on the dialect. Some of the letters in the Coptic alphabet that are of Greek origin were normally reserved for Greek words. Old Coptic texts used several graphemes that were not retained in the literary Coptic orthography of later centuries.

In Sahidic, syllable boundaries may have been marked by a supralinear stroke ⟨◌̄⟩, or the stroke may have tied letters together in one word, since Coptic texts did not otherwise indicate word divisions. Some scribal traditions use a diaeresis over the letters ⲓ and ⲩ at the beginning of a word or to mark a diphthong. Bohairic uses a superposed point or small stroke known as ϫⲓⲛⲕⲓⲙ (jinkim, "movement"). When jinkim is placed over a vowel it is pronounced independently, and when it is placed over a consonant a short ⲉ precedes it.

== Grammar ==
Coptic is primarily a fusional (inflectional) language, though some scholars, such as Loprieno (1995), have suggested it has agglutinative or even polysynthetic tendencies. Its morphology relies heavily on prefixation and clitics, but these forms frequently encode multiple grammatical functions. Its standard word order is subject–verb–object, though it can shift to verb–subject–object with the appropriate preposition before the subject. Number, gender, tense, and mood are marked by prefixes and clitics, which evolved from Late Egyptian. While earlier stages of Egyptian used suffixation for verb conjugation, Coptic largely replaced these with periphrastic constructions and prefix-based inflection, though vestiges of suffix inflection survive in certain verbs and possessive structures. For example, the Middle Egyptian form *satāpafa ('he chooses', written stp.f in hieroglyphs) corresponds to the Coptic (Sahidic) f.sotp (ϥⲥⲱⲧⲡ̅, 'he chooses'), where the prefix "f-" encodes multiple grammatical functions simultaneously, characteristic of fusional morphology rather than agglutination.

=== Nouns ===
All Coptic nouns carry grammatical gender, either masculine or feminine, usually marked through a definite article as in the Romance languages, though Coptic articles are prefixes rather than separate words. Masculine nouns are marked with the article /pə, peː/ and feminine nouns with the article /tə, teː/ in the Sahidic dialect and /pi, əp/ and /ti, ət/ in the Bohairic dialect.

Bohairic: ⲡⲓⲣⲱⲙⲓ /pəˈɾomə/ – 'the man' / ϯϫⲓϫ /təˈt͡ʃiːt͡ʃ/ – 'the hand'
Sahidic: ⲡⲉⲣⲱⲙⲉ /pəˈɾomə/ – 'the man' / ⲧⲉϫⲓϫ /təˈt͡ʃiːt͡ʃ/ – 'the hand'

The definite and indefinite articles also indicate number; however, only definite articles mark gender. Coptic has a number of broken plurals, a vestige of Older Egyptian, but in the majority of cases, the article marks number. Generally, nouns inflected for plurality end in /wə/, but there are some irregularities. The dual was another feature of earlier Egyptian that survives in Coptic in only few words, such as ⲥⲛⲁⲩ (snau) 'two'.

Words of Greek origin keep their original grammatical gender, except for neuter nouns, which become masculine in Coptic.

Possession of definite nouns is expressed with a series of possessive articles which are prefixed to the noun. These articles agree with the person, number, and gender of the possessor and the number and gender of the possessed noun. The forms of the possessive article vary according to dialect.

Coptic possessive articles
Person/Number/Gender		Dialect					
Possessor	Possessed	Bohairic	Fayyumic	Oxyrhynchite	Sahidic	Lycopolitan	Akhmimic
1SG	M	ⲡⲁ-					
1SG	F	ⲧⲁ-					
1SG	PL	ⲛⲁ-					
2SG.M	M	ⲡⲉⲕ-					
2SG.M	F	ⲧⲉⲕ-					
2SG.M	PL	ⲛⲉⲕ-					
2SG.F	M	ⲡⲉ-			ⲡⲟⲩ-	ⲡⲉ-	
2SG.F	F	ⲧⲉ-			ⲧⲟⲩ-	ⲧⲉ-	
2SG.F	PL	ⲛⲉ-			ⲛⲟⲩ-	ⲛⲉ-	
3SG.M	M	ⲡⲉϥ-					
3SG.M	F	ⲧⲉϥ-					
3SG.M	PL	ⲛⲉϥ-					
3SG.F	M	ⲡⲉⲥ-					
3SG.F	F	ⲧⲉⲥ-					
3SG.F	PL	ⲛⲉⲥ-					
1PL	M	ⲡⲉⲛ-					
1PL	F	ⲧⲉⲛ-					
1PL	PL	ⲛⲉⲛ-					
2PL	M	ⲡⲉⲧⲉⲛ-		ⲡⲉⲧⲛ̄-			
2PL	F	ⲧⲉⲧⲉⲛ-		ⲧⲉⲧⲛ̄-			
2PL	PL	ⲛⲉⲧⲉⲛ-		ⲛⲉⲧⲛ̄-			
3PL	M	ⲡⲟⲩ-	ⲡⲉⲩ-			ⲡⲟⲩ-	
3PL	F	ⲧⲟⲩ-	ⲧⲉⲩ-			ⲧⲟⲩ-	
3PL	PL	ⲛⲟⲩ-	ⲛⲉⲩ-			ⲛⲟⲩ-	

Examples
Translation	Dialect					
Translation	Bohairic	Fayyumic	Oxyrhynchite	Sahidic	Lycopolitan	Akhmimic
"my brother"	ⲡⲁ-ⲥⲟⲛ	ⲡⲁ-ⲥⲁⲛ		ⲡⲁ-ⲥⲟⲛ	ⲡⲁ-ⲥⲁⲛ	
"my sister"	ⲧⲁ-ⲥⲱⲛⲓ		ⲧⲁ-ⲥⲟⲛⲉ	ⲧⲁ-ⲥⲱⲛⲉ		
"my siblings"	ⲛⲁ-ⲥⲛⲏⲟⲩ		ⲛⲁ-ⲥⲛⲏⲩ			
"your (SG.M) brother"	ⲡⲉⲕ-ⲥⲟⲛ	ⲡⲉⲕ-ⲥⲁⲛ		ⲡⲉⲕ-ⲥⲟⲛ	ⲡⲉⲕ-ⲥⲁⲛ	
"your (SG.M) sister"	ⲧⲉⲕ-ⲥⲱⲛⲓ		ⲧⲉⲕ-ⲥⲟⲛⲉ	ⲧⲉⲕ-ⲥⲱⲛⲉ		
"your (SG.M) siblings"	ⲛⲉⲕ-ⲥⲛⲏⲟⲩ		ⲛⲉⲕ-ⲥⲛⲏⲩ			
"your (SG.F) brother"	ⲡⲉ-ⲥⲟⲛ	ⲡⲉ-ⲥⲁⲛ		ⲡⲟⲩ-ⲥⲟⲛ	ⲡⲉ-ⲥⲁⲛ	
"your (SG.F) sister"	ⲧⲉ-ⲥⲱⲛⲓ		ⲧⲉ-ⲥⲟⲛⲉ	ⲧⲟⲩ-ⲥⲱⲛⲉ	ⲧⲉ-ⲥⲱⲛⲉ	
"your (SG.F) siblings"	ⲛⲉ-ⲥⲛⲏⲟⲩ		ⲛⲉ-ⲥⲛⲏⲩ	ⲛⲟⲩ-ⲥⲛⲏⲩ	ⲛⲉ-ⲥⲛⲏⲩ	
"his brother"	ⲡⲉϥ-ⲥⲟⲛ	ⲡⲉϥ-ⲥⲁⲛ		ⲡⲉϥ-ⲥⲟⲛ	ⲡⲉϥ-ⲥⲁⲛ	
"his sister"	ⲧⲉϥ-ⲥⲱⲛⲓ		ⲧⲉϥ-ⲥⲟⲛⲉ	ⲧⲉϥ-ⲥⲱⲛⲉ		
"his siblings"	ⲛⲉϥ-ⲥⲛⲏⲟⲩ		ⲛⲉϥ-ⲥⲛⲏⲩ			
"her brother"	ⲡⲉⲥ-ⲥⲟⲛ	ⲡⲉⲥ-ⲥⲁⲛ		ⲡⲉⲥ-ⲥⲟⲛ	ⲡⲉⲥ-ⲥⲁⲛ	
"her sister"	ⲧⲉⲥ-ⲥⲱⲛⲓ		ⲧⲉⲥ-ⲥⲟⲛⲉ	ⲧⲉⲥ-ⲥⲱⲛⲉ		
"her siblings"	ⲛⲉⲥ-ⲥⲛⲏⲟⲩ		ⲛⲉⲥ-ⲥⲛⲏⲩ			
"our brother"	ⲡⲉⲛ-ⲥⲟⲛ	ⲡⲉⲛ-ⲥⲁⲛ		ⲡⲉⲛ-ⲥⲟⲛ	ⲡⲉⲛ-ⲥⲁⲛ	
"our sister"	ⲧⲉⲛ-ⲥⲱⲛⲓ		ⲧⲉⲛ-ⲥⲟⲛⲉ	ⲧⲉⲛ-ⲥⲱⲛⲉ		
"our siblings"	ⲛⲉⲛ-ⲥⲛⲏⲟⲩ		ⲛⲉⲛ-ⲥⲛⲏⲩ			
"your (PL) brother"	ⲡⲉⲧⲉⲛ-ⲥⲟⲛ	ⲡⲉⲧⲉⲛ-ⲥⲁⲛ	ⲡⲉⲧⲛ̄-ⲥⲁⲛ	ⲡⲉⲧⲛ̄-ⲥⲟⲛ	ⲡⲉⲧⲛ̄-ⲥⲁⲛ	
"your (PL) sister"	ⲧⲉⲧⲉⲛ-ⲥⲱⲛⲓ		ⲧⲉⲧⲛ̄-ⲥⲟⲛⲉ	ⲧⲉⲧⲛ̄-ⲥⲱⲛⲉ		
"your (PL) siblings"	ⲛⲉⲧⲉⲛ-ⲥⲛⲏⲟⲩ		ⲛⲉⲧⲛ̄-ⲥⲛⲏⲩ			
"their brother"	ⲡⲟⲩ-ⲥⲟⲛ	ⲡⲉⲩ-ⲥⲁⲛ		ⲡⲉⲩ-ⲥⲟⲛ	ⲡⲟⲩ-ⲥⲁⲛ	
"their sister"	ⲧⲟⲩ-ⲥⲱⲛⲓ	ⲧⲉⲩ-ⲥⲱⲛⲓ	ⲧⲉⲩ-ⲥⲟⲛⲉ	ⲧⲉⲩ-ⲥⲱⲛⲉ	ⲧⲟⲩ-ⲥⲱⲛⲉ	
"their siblings"	ⲛⲟⲩ-ⲥⲛⲏⲟⲩ	ⲛⲉⲩ-ⲥⲛⲏⲟⲩ	ⲛⲉⲩ-ⲥⲛⲏⲩ		ⲛⲟⲩ-ⲥⲛⲏⲩ	

=== Pronouns ===
Coptic pronouns are of two kinds, dependent and independent. Independent pronouns are used when the pronoun is acting as the subject of a sentence, as the object of a verb, or with a preposition. Dependent pronouns are a series of prefixes and suffixes that can attach to verbs and other nouns. Coptic verbs can therefore be said to inflect for the person, number and gender of the subject and the object: a pronominal prefix marks the subject, and a pronominal suffix marks the object, e.g. "I I'have'it the ball." When (as in this case) the subject is a pronoun, it normally is not also expressed independently, unless for emphasis.

As in other Afroasiatic languages, gender of pronouns differ only in the second and third person singular.

Pronouns of the Bohairic dialect
			Independent		Proclitic	As suffix
			Stressed	Unstressed	Proclitic	As suffix
1st person	singular		ⲁⲛⲟⲕ anok	ⲁⲛ̀ⲕ- anək-	ϯ- ti-	⸗ⲓ =i
1st person	plural		ⲁⲛⲟⲛ anon	ⲁⲛ- an-	ⲧⲉⲛ- ten-	⸗ⲛ =n
2nd person	singular	masc.	ⲛ̀ⲑⲟⲕ əntʰok	ⲛ̀ⲧⲉⲕ- əntek-	ⲕ̀- ək-	⸗ⲕ =k
2nd person	singular	fem.	ⲛ̀ⲑⲟ əntʰo	ⲛ̀ⲧⲉ- ənte-	ⲧⲉ- ⲧⲣ- te-, tr-	⸗ ⸗ⲉ ⸗ⲣ ⸗ⲣⲉ ⸗ⲧⲉ =∅, =e, =r(e), =te
2nd person	plural		ⲛ̀ⲑⲱⲧⲉⲛ əntʰōten	ⲛ̀ⲧⲉⲛ- ənten-	ⲧⲉⲧⲉⲛ- teten-	⸗ⲧⲉⲛ ⸗ⲧⲉⲧⲉⲛ =ten, =teten
3rd person	singular	masc.	ⲛ̀ⲑⲟϥ əntʰof		ϥ̀- əf-	⸗ϥ =f
3rd person	singular	fem.	ⲛ̀ⲑⲟⲥ əntʰos		ⲥ̀- əs-	⸗ⲥ =s
3rd person	plural		ⲛ̀ⲑⲱⲟⲩ əntʰōou		ⲥⲉ- se-	⸗ⲟⲩ =ou

=== Adjectives ===
Most Coptic adjectives are actually nouns that have the attributive particle n to make them adjectival. In all stages of Egyptian, this morpheme is also used to express the genitive; for example, the Bohairic word for 'Egyptian', ⲣⲉⲙⲛ̀ⲭⲏⲙⲓ /remənkʰeːmə/, is a combination of the nominal prefix ⲣⲉⲙ- rem- (the reduced form of ⲣⲱⲙⲓ rōmi 'man'), followed by the genitive morpheme ⲛ̀ ən ('of') and finally the word for Egypt, ⲭⲏⲙⲓ kʰēmi.

=== Verbs ===
==== Verbal grade system ====
Coptic, like Ancient Egyptian and Semitic languages, has root-and-pattern or templatic morphology, and the basic meaning of a verb is contained in a root and various derived forms of root are obtained by varying the vowel pattern. For example, the root for 'build' is kt. It has four derived forms:

1. ⲕⲟⲧ kɔt (the absolute state grade)
2. ⲕⲉⲧ- ket- (the nominal state grade)
3. ⲕⲟⲧ⸗ kot= (the pronominal state grade)
4. ⲕⲉⲧ kɛt (the stative grade)

(The nominal state grade is also called the construct state in some grammars of Coptic.)

The absolute, nominal, and pronominal state grades are used in different syntactic contexts. The absolute state grade of a transitive verb is used before a direct object with the accusative preposition /ən, əm/, and the nominal state grade is used before a direct object with no case-marking. The pronominal state grade is used before a pronominal direct object enclitic. In addition, many verbs also have a neutral state grade, used to express a state resulting from the action of the verb. Compare the following forms:

ⲁⲓϫⲓⲙⲓ ⲙ̀ⲡⲁⲓⲱⲧ
Aijimi əmpaiōt
a-i-jimi əm-p-a-iōt
PFV-1SG-find.ABS PREP-DEF:MASC:SG-1SG-father
'I found my father.'

ⲁⲓϫⲉⲙ ⲡⲁⲓⲱⲧ
Aijem paiōt
a-i-jem p-a-iōt
PFV-1SG-find.NOM DEF:MASC:SG-1SG-father
'I found my father.'

ⲁⲓϭⲉⲛⲧϥ
Aijəntf
a-i-jənt=f
PFV-1SG-find.PRONOM=3MSG
'I found him.'

For most transitive verbs, both absolute and nominal state grade verbs are available for non-pronominal objects. However, there is one important restriction, known as Jernstedt's rule (or the Stern-Jernstedt rule) (Jernstedt 1927): present-tense sentences cannot be used in the nominal state grade. Thus sentences in the present tense always show a pattern like the first example above (absolute state), never the second pattern (nominal state).

In general, the four grades of Coptic verb are not predictable from the root, and are listed in the lexicon for each verb. The following chart shows some typical patterns of correspondence:

Gloss	Absolute state		Nominal state		Pronominal state		Neutral state	
Spread	ⲡⲱⲣϣ̀	poːrəʃ	ⲡⲣ̀ϣ	pərʃ	ⲡⲱⲣϣ	poːrʃ	ⲡⲟⲣϣ̀	poʔrəʃ
Dig	ϣⲓⲕⲉ	ʃiːkə	ϣⲉⲕⲧ	ʃekt	ϣⲁⲕⲧ	ʃakt	ϣⲟⲕⲉ	ʃoʔkə
Comfort	ⲥⲟⲗⲥⲗ̀	solsəl	ⲥⲗ̀ⲥⲗ̀	səlsəl	ⲥⲗ̀ⲥⲱⲗ	səlsoːl	ⲥⲗ̀ⲥⲱⲗ	səlsoːl
Roll	ⲥⲕⲟⲣⲕⲣ̀	skorkər	ⲥⲕⲣ̀ⲕⲣ̀	skərkər	ⲥⲕⲣ̀ⲕⲱⲣ	skərkoːr	ⲥⲕⲣ̀ⲕⲱⲣ	skərkoːr
Build	ⲕⲱⲧ	koːt	ⲕⲉⲧ	ket	ⲕⲟⲧ	kot	ⲕⲏⲧ	keːt

It is hazardous to make firm generalisations about the relationships between these grade forms, but the nominal state is usually shorter than the corresponding absolute and neutral forms. Absolute and neutral state forms are usually bisyllabic or contain a long vowel; the corresponding nominal state forms are monosyllabic or have short vowels.

==== Tense/aspect/mood inflection ====
Coptic has a very large number of distinct tense-aspect-mood categories, expressed by particles which are either before the verb or before the subject. The future /na/ is a preverbal particle and follows the subject:

Ⲡⲉϫⲟⲉⲓⲥ ⲛⲁⲕⲣⲓⲛⲉ ⲛ̀ⲛⲉⲗⲁⲟⲥ
Pecoeis nakrine ənnelaos
pe-joeis na-krine ən-ne-laos
DEF:MASC:SG-lord FUT-judge PREP-DEF:PL-people
'The lord will judge the nations.'

In contrast, the perfective /a/ is a pre-subject particle:

Ⲁ ⲧⲉϥⲥⲱⲛⲉ ⲇⲉ ⲟⲗ ⲛ̀ⲛⲉϥⲕⲏⲥ
A tefsōne de ol ənnefkēs
a te-f-sōne de ol ən-ne-f-kēs
PFV DEF:F:SG-3MSG-sister PART carry.ABS PREP-DEF:PL-3MSG-bone
'His sister carried his bones.'

There is some variation in the labels for the tense/aspect/mood categories. The chart below shows the labels from Reintges (2004), Lambdin (1983), Plumley (1948). (Where they agree, only one label is shown.) Each form lists the morphology found with a nonpronominal subject (Marked with an underscore in Coptic) and a third person singular masculine pronominal subject ('he'):

Tense name			Nominal subject		3rd M. Sg. Pronominal subject	
Reintges	Lambdin	Plumley	Nominal subject		3rd M. Sg. Pronominal subject	
First Present		Present I	_	NP	ϥ-	f-
Second Present; Circumstantial			ⲉⲣⲉ _	ere NP	ⲉϥ-	ef-
Relative of First Present			ⲉⲧⲉⲣⲉ _	etere NP	ⲉⲧϥ̀-	etəf-
Preterite Present	Imperfect	Imperfect	ⲛⲉⲣⲉ _	nere NP	ⲛⲉϥ-	nef-
Preterite Past			ⲛⲉⲁ _	nea NP	ⲛⲉⲁϥ-	neaf-
Future I			_ ⲛⲁ-	NP na-	ϥⲛⲁ-	fna-
Future II			ⲉⲣⲉ _ ⲛⲁ-	ere NP na-	ⲉϥⲛⲁ-	efna-
Future III			ⲉⲣⲉ _	ere NP	ⲉϥⲉ-	efe-
	Negative Future III	Negative Future II	ⲛ̀ⲛⲉ _	ənne NP	ⲛ̀ⲛⲉϥ-	ənnef-
	Imperfect of Future	Future Imperfect	ⲛⲉⲣⲉ _ ⲛⲁ-	nere NP na-	ⲛⲉϥⲛⲁ-	nefna-
Perfect I			ⲁ _	a NP	ⲁϥ-	af-
Negative Perfect I			ⲙ̀ⲡⲉ _	əmpe NP	ⲙ̀ⲡⲉϥ-	əmpef-
Perfect II			ⲛ̀ⲧⲉ _	ənta NP	ⲛ̀ⲧⲉϥ-	əntaf-
Habitual			ϣⲁⲣⲉ _	ʃare NP	ϣⲁϥ-	ʃaf-
Habitual I			ⲉϣⲁⲣⲉ _	eʃare NP	ⲉϣⲁϥ-	eʃaf-
Negative Habitual			ⲙⲉⲣⲉ _	mere NP	ⲙⲉϥ-	mef-
Jussive	Injunctive	Optative	ⲙⲁⲣⲉ _	mare NP	ⲙⲁⲣⲉϥ-	maref-
Conditional			ⲉⲣϣⲁⲛ _	erʃan NP	ⲉϥϣⲁⲛ-	efʃan-
Conjunctive			ⲛ̀ⲧⲉ _	ənte NP	ⲛϥ̀-	nəf-
Inferential	Future Conjunctive of Result	Future I	ⲧⲁⲣⲉ _	tare NP	ⲧⲁⲣⲉϥ-	taref-
Temporal			ⲛ̀ⲧⲉⲣⲉ _	əntere NP	ⲛ̀ⲧⲉⲣⲉϥ-	ənteref-
Terminative	"Until"	"Unfulfilled action	ϣⲁⲛⲧⲉ _	ʃante NP	ϣⲁⲛⲧϥ̀-	ʃantəf-
	"Not yet"	"Unfulfilled action	ⲙ̀ⲡⲁⲧⲉ _	əmpate NP	ⲙ̀ⲡⲁⲧϥ̀-	əmpatəf-

An approximate range of use for most of the tense/aspect/mood categories is shown in the following table:

Tense name (Lambdin)	Approximate range of use
Present I	Present time in narrative (predicate focus)
Relative of Present I	Non-subject relative clause in present tense
Circumstantial	Background clauses; relative clauses with indefinite heads
Imperfect	Action in progress in the past
Future I	Simple future tense (predicate focus)
Future II	Simple future tense (adverbial focus)
Future III	Future tense conveyed as necessary, inevitable, or obligatory
Perfect I	Primary narrative tense (predicate focus)
Negative Perfect I	Negative of Perfect I
Perfect II	Primary narrative tense (adverbial focus); relative clause form of Perfect I
Habitual	Characteristic or habitual action
Negative Habitual	Negative of Habitual
Injunctive	Imperative for first and third persons ('let me', 'let him', etc.)
Conditional	Protasis (if-clause) of a conditional (if-then) statement
Conjunctive	Event shares the TAM of a preceding initial verb
Future Conjunctive of Result	Used in clauses that express a resultant action
Temporal	Past action in a subordinate temporal clause ("when NP V-ed, ...")

==== Second tenses ====
An unusual feature of Coptic is the extensive use of a set of "second tenses", which are required in certain syntactic contexts. "Second tenses" are also called "relative tenses" in some work.

=== Prepositions ===
Coptic has prepositions, rather than postpositions:

ϩⲓ ⲡ̀ϫⲟⲓ
hi pjoi
hi p-joi
on DEF:M:SG-ship
'on the ship'

Pronominal objects of prepositions are indicated with enclitic pronouns:

ⲉⲣⲟⲕ
erok
on-2MSG
'to you'

ⲛⲁⲛ
nan
for-1PL
'for us'

Many prepositions have different forms before the enclitic pronouns. Compare:

ⲉ̀ⲡ̀ϫⲟⲓ
e-p-joi
to-DEF:SG:M-ship
'to the ship'

ⲉⲣⲟϥ
erof
on-3MSG
'to him'

== Syntax ==
=== Sentential syntax ===
Coptic typically shows subject–verb–object (SVO) word order, as in the following examples:

ⲁ ⲧⲉϭⲁⲙⲁⲩⲗⲉ ⲙⲓⲥⲉ ⲛ̀ⲟⲩϣⲏⲣⲉ. ⲛ̀ϣⲓⲙⲉ
A tecamaule mise ənoušēre ənšime
a te-camaule mise ən-ou-šēre ən-šime
PFV DEF:F:SG-camel deliver.ABS PREP-INDEF:SG-girl link-woman
'The she-camel delivered a daughter.'

ⲡⲉϫⲟⲉⲓⲥ ⲛⲁⲕⲣⲓⲛⲉ ⲛ̀ⲛⲉⲗⲁⲟⲥ
Pejoeis nakrine ənnelaos
pe-joeis na-krine ən-ne-laos
DEF:M:SG-lord FUT-judge PREP-DEF:PL-people
'The Lord will judge the people.'

ⲁⲓϭⲓⲛⲉ ⲙ̀ⲡⲁⲉⲓⲱⲧ
Aicine əmpaeiōt
a-i-cine əm-p-a-eiōt
PFV-1sg-find.ABS PREP-DEF:MASC:SG-1SG-father
'I found my father.'

The verbs in these sentences are in the absolute state grade, which requires that its direct object be introduced with the preposition /ən, əm/. This preposition functions like accusative case.

There is also an alternative nominal state grade of the verb in which the direct object of the verb follows with no preposition:

Ⲁⲓϭⲉⲛ ⲡⲁⲉⲓⲱⲧ
Aicen paeiōt
a-i-cen p-a-eiōt
PFV-1SG-find.NOM DEF:M:SG-1SG-father
'I found my father.'

== Vocabulary ==
The core lexicon of Coptic is Egyptian, most closely related to the preceding Demotic phase of the language. Up to 40% of the vocabulary of literary Coptic is drawn from Greek, but borrowings are not always fully adapted to the Coptic phonological system and may have semantic differences as well. There are instances of Coptic texts having passages that are almost entirely composed from Greek lexical roots. However, that is likely because the majority of Coptic religious texts are direct translations of Greek works.

What invariably attracts the attention of the reader of a Coptic text, especially if it is written in the Sa'idic dialect, is the very liberal use which is made of Greek loan words, of which so few, indeed, are to be found in the Ancient Egyptian language. There Greek loan words occur everywhere in Coptic literature, be it Biblical, liturgical, theological, or non-literary, i.e. legal documents and personal letters. Though nouns and verbs predominate, the Greek loan words may come from any other part of speech except pronouns'

The Greek loanwords in Coptic retain their original male or female gender, but Greek neuter nouns are treated as masculine in Coptic. The Greek nouns are usually inflected in the singular and in the nominative case though occasionally.

Words or concepts for which no adequate Egyptian translation existed were taken directly from Greek to avoid altering the meaning of the religious message. In addition, other Egyptian words that would have adequately translated the Greek equivalents were not used as they were perceived as having overt pagan associations. Old Coptic texts use many such words, phrases and epithets; for example, the word ⲧⲃⲁⲓⲧⲱⲩ '(Who is) in (His) Mountain', is an epithet of Anubis. There are also traces of some archaic grammatical features, such as residues of the Demotic relative clause, lack of an indefinite article and possessive use of suffixes.

Thus, the transition from the old traditions to the new Christian religion also contributed to the adoption of Greek words into the Coptic religious lexicon. It is safe to assume that the everyday speech of the native population retained, to a greater extent, its indigenous Egyptian character, which is sometimes reflected in Coptic nonecclesiastical documents such as letters and contracts.

=== Influence on other languages ===
In addition to influencing the grammar, vocabulary and syntax of Egyptian Arabic, Coptic has lent to both Arabic and Hebrew such words as:

- timsāḥ 'Nile crocodile' (Arabic: تمساح, romanized: timsāḥ; Biblical Hebrew: תִּמְסָח, romanized: timsāḥ), from ⲉⲙⲥⲁϩ emsah; this subsequently entered Turkish as timsah. Coptic ⲉⲙⲥⲁϩ is grammatically masculine and hence would have taken the form pemsah (Sahidic: ⲡⲉⲙⲥⲁϩ; Bohairic: ⲡⲓⲉⲙⲥⲁϩ) with the definite articular prefix p-. It is unclear why the word entered Semitic languages with initial t-, which would have required the word to be grammatically feminine (i.e. Sahidic: *ⲧⲉⲙⲥⲁϩ; Bohairic: *ϯⲉⲙⲥⲁϩ).
- ṭūba, Arabic: طوبة, 'brick'; Sahidic: ⲧⲱⲱⲃⲉ, tōōbe; Bohairic ⲧⲱⲃⲓ, tōbi; this subsequently entered Catalan and Spanish via Andalusi Arabic as tova and adobe respectively, the latter of which was borrowed by American English.
- Arabic: واحة, romanized: wāḥa, lit. 'oasis'; Sahidic: ⲟⲩⲁϩⲉ, ouahe; Bohairic: ⲟⲩⲉϩⲓ, ouehi; this subsequently entered Turkish as vaha

A few words of Coptic origin are found in the Greek language; some of the words were later lent to various European languages — such as barge, from Coptic baare (ⲃⲁⲁⲣⲉ, "small boat").

However, most words of Egyptian origin that entered Koine Greek, and subsequently other European languages, came directly from Egyptian, often from Demotic. An example is the Greek oasis (ὄασις), which comes directly from Egyptian wḥꜣt or Demotic wḥj. However, Coptic reborrowed some words of Egyptian origin from Greek.

Many place names in modern Egypt are Arabic adaptations of their former Coptic names:

Coptic name	Modern name	
ⲥⲓⲱⲟⲩⲧ (səjōwt)	أسيوط (ʾasyūṭ)	Asyut
ⲫⲓⲟⲙ (phəyom)	الفيوم (al-fayyūm)	Faiyum
ϯⲙⲉⲛϩⲱⲣ (təmənhōr)	دمنهور (damanhūr)	Damanhur
ⲥⲟⲩⲁⲛ (swan)	أسوان (ʾaswān)	Aswan
ⲙⲉⲛϥ (mənf)	منف (manf)	Memphis

The Coptic name ⲡⲁⲡⲛⲟⲩⲧⲉ, papnoute (pꜣy-pꜣ-nṯr 'belonging to God' or 'he of God') was adapted into Arabic as Babnouda, which remains a common name among Copts to this day. It was also borrowed into Koine Greek as Παφνούτιος (Paphnutius). That, in turn, is the source of the Russian name Пафнутий (Pafnuty), perhaps best known in the name of the mathematician Pafnuty Chebyshev.

== Literature ==
The oldest Coptic writings date to the pre-Christian era (Old Coptic), though Coptic literature consists mostly of texts written by prominent saints of the Coptic Church such as Anthony the Great, Pachomius the Great, and Shenoute. Shenoute helped fully standardise the Coptic language through his many sermons, treatises and homilies, which formed the basis of early Coptic literature.

== Sample text ==
Coptic: ⲥⲟⲩⲙⲟⲥⲉ ⲣⲱⲙⲉ ⲛⲓⲙ ⲉⲩϣⲏϣ ⲉ ⲛⲉⲩⲉⲣⲏⲩ ϩⲛ ⲟⲩⲇⲓⲕⲁⲓⲟⲥⲩⲛⲏ. ⲟⲩⲛ ϭⲟⲙ ⲙⲙⲟⲩ ⲉⲧⲣⲉⲩⲙⲉⲉⲩⲉ ⲁⲩⲱ ϣϣⲉ ⲉⲧⲣⲉⲩⲣ-ⲙⲛⲧⲙⲁⲓⲥⲟⲛ.

Bohairic Coptic: Ⲉ̀ⲫ̀ⲟⲩⲁⲓ ⲥⲉⲙⲓⲥⲓ ⲣⲉⲙϩⲉⲩ ⲛⲉⲙ ⲉⲧϣⲱϣ ⲉ̀ ⲁⲝⲓⲁ ⲛⲉⲙ ⲇⲓⲕⲁⲓⲟⲥⲩⲛⲏ. Ⲛ̀ⲑⲱⲟⲩ ⲥⲉⲉⲣϩ̀ⲙⲟⲧ ⲅⲛⲱⲙⲏ ⲛⲉⲙ ⲥⲩⲛⲏⲇⲏⲥⲓⲥ ⲟⲩⲟϩ ⲙ̀ⲡⲉⲛⲑⲣⲉⲩⲁⲣϣⲏⲧ ⲙ̀ⲙⲉⲧⲣⲱⲙⲓ ϩⲓⲛⲁ ⲛ̀ⲑⲱⲟⲩ ⲙ̀ⲫ̀ⲣⲏϯ ⲛ̀ⲥ̀ⲛⲏⲟⲩ.

Bohairic Coptic Transliteration: Ephouai semisi remheu nem etshōsh e axia nem dikaiosunē. Enthōou se’erehmot gnōmē nem sunēdēsis ouoh empenthreuarshēt em’metrōmi hina enthōou emephrēti enesnēou.

English: All human beings are born free and equal in dignity and rights. They are endowed with reason and conscience and should act towards one another in a spirit of brotherhood.

== See also ==
- British Library Coptic Language Collection
- List of Coptic place names
- Rosetta Stone
