= Paphnutius the Ascetic =

Egyptian anchorite of the fourth century

Saint Paphnutius the Ascetic

Hermit, Anchorite
- Born: c. 305 AD
- Died: after 395 AD; Egypt
- Venerated in: Roman Catholic Church; Eastern Orthodox Churches; Oriental Orthodox Churches
- Feast: 15 February & 25 September (Byzantine Christianity); 15 Meshir (Coptic Christianity)

Paphnutius the Ascetic (Coptic: Ⲁⲃⲃⲁ Ⲡⲁⲫⲛⲟⲩϯ, born 305 AD - died after 395 AD), also known as Paphnutius the Hermit, was an Egyptian anchorite of the fourth century. He is most famous for his accounts of the lives of many hermits of the Egyptian desert, such as Saint Onuphrius.

== Life ==
Paphnutius was the disciple of Saint Macarius the Great who was an anchorite in the Egyptian desert.

His feast is celebrated on 15 February and 25 September in the Orthodox Church in America. In Coptic Christianity, his feast is observed on 15 Meshir.

He was visited by Cassian in 395, when he was ninety.

He is also the subject of the play Paphnutius by Hrosvit (c. 935 – c. 1001), a Benedictine nun from Saxony, in which he converts the courtesan Thais to Christianity. This play in turn has become the subject of study, most notably by Sandro Sticca.
