= Coptic pronunciation reform =

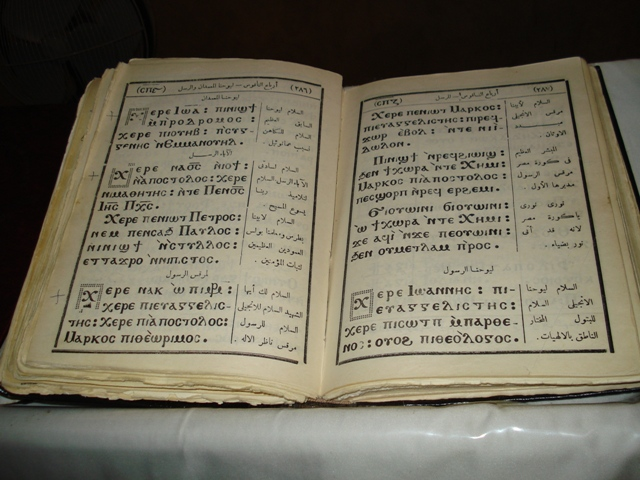
The Christian Coptic Orthodox Psalmody in the Coptic Language (with Arabic annotations).

Coptic pronunciation reform, since 1850, has resulted in two major shifts in the liturgical pronunciation of Bohairic, the dialect of Coptic used as the language of the Coptic Orthodox Church. Since Coptic had ceased to be spoken as a mother-tongue by this time, a change in education changed how the language was spoken. The two traditions of pronunciation in contemporary use arise from two successive reforms in the 19th and 20th centuries:

- The "reformed pronunciation" or "Greco-Bohairic pronunciation", mandated by Cyril IV (1854–1861), models the pronunciation of the sounds of Coptic, after how the equivalent letters were pronounced in Modern Greek.
- The "Old Bohairic pronunciation" aims to reconstruct the pronunciation of the language as it was before this reform.

== Reformed pronunciation (Greco-Bohairic) ==
During the time of Pope Cyril IV of Alexandria (1854–1861), there were discussions between the Coptic and Greek Orthodox Churches of Alexandria about whether to unite, so one Patriarch would be the head of both Churches in Egypt. The unification did not come about, but one of the proposals made at the time was to make Coptic pronunciation conform more closely to Greek.

The chief architect of this project was ʻIryān Girgis Muftāḥ, who taught Coptic in the Patriarchal Church at that time. Since the Coptic alphabet shares many letters with the Greek alphabet, he assumed that any change of Coptic pronunciation towards Greek would be a positive reform and would also assist with the expected union between the churches.

At the time, popular feeling in Egypt had been stirred up by the French military campaigns (1798–1801), whose scientists remained in Egypt for some years, and many people had come to feel that the European ideas and practices were superior to Egyptian (or Ottoman) customs. The Greco-Bohairic pronunciation introduced phonemes like /ð/, /p/, /θ/ and /v/ in addition to an increase in glottal stops.

The reformed pronunciation (Greco-Bohairic pronunciation) was spread by the authority of the Klirikia (Theological Seminary), albeit not without controversy; by the 1950s, it had become established throughout Egypt, except in a small number of parishes in Upper Egypt which refused to accept any priest from outside their local village. In the course of this campaign of reform, the old Bohairic pronunciation was often inaccurately referred to as Sahidic, the name of another Coptic dialect. However, some European Coptologists commented on the fact that the villagers of Upper Egypt retained a more authentic tradition, and wrote disparagingly about the Greek-influenced pronunciation. Most notably, Dr. G. Sobhy commented on Greco-Bohairic pronunciation, saying:

"All modern books written on Coptic by native authors adopt more or less a mutilated form of Greek pronunciation and apply it entirely to their language. Unfortunately none of our native authors here knows sufficient Greek to realise the outstanding mistakes he is trying to form into rules applicable to the Coptic language."

== Old Bohairic pronunciation ==
Several caveats may be mentioned with regard to the Greco-Bohairic pronunciation reform:

a) There is no evidence that Coptic adopted the exact phonetic values of Greek alphabet.
b) There is uncertainty which dialect of Greek was spoken predominantly in Egypt, or whether Copts spoke an Egyptian dialect of Greek.
c) Greek has undergone several natural phonetic changes, to the extent that the Koine Greek phonetic values are not certain at this time.

During the 1960s, with the encouragement of Pope Shenouda III of Alexandria, Dr. Emile Maher studied the history of Coptic pronunciation and in 1968, he announced that he had rediscovered the Old Bohairic pronunciation. After completing a doctorate on the subject at Oxford University (Thesis available online), he returned to Egypt hoping to restore the older way of pronouncing Coptic in place of the reformed pronunciation (sometimes referred to as Greco-Bohairic). The Institute of Coptic Language, which studied and promoted the Old Bohairic pronunciation, came under strong opposition from some Church leaders, but the Pope continued to support Dr. Maher, and ordained him priest (as Father Shenouda) in the 1990s. The Old Bohairic pronunciation is used in the Monastery of St. Shenouda in Rochester, New York, in which Father Shenouda Maher now serves.

The Old Bohairic pronunciation is evidence-based, using archived sound-recordings and transcriptions of the oral tradition of Zeneya, Dabeyya, and other villages made by various scholars such as Georgy Sobhy, Petraeus, Galtier, Maria Cramer, and Rochmonteix, in addition to the works of W. H. Worrell and Vycichl. Maher also consulted documents held in libraries and monasteries throughout Egypt—including Coptic manuscripts written in the Arabic script, such as the Damanhour euchologion, and tenth-century Arabic texts written in Coptic letters—and analysed scribal transcription errors in the manuscript tradition.
