= Paphnutius of Thebes =

Egyptian saint

Saint Paphnutius of Thebes
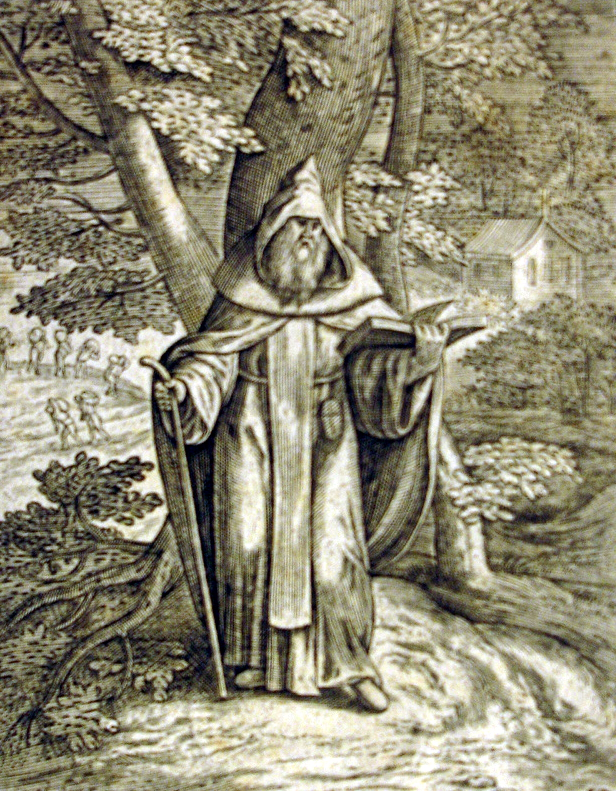
- Paphnutius of Egypt. Etching from the 16/17th century. Private Collection.

hermit
- Born: c. 251 AD; Egypt
- Died: 4th century AD
- Venerated in: Eastern Orthodox Church; Roman Catholic Church; Oriental Orthodoxy; Lutheranism
- Feast: 11 September

Paphnutius of Thebes (born c. 251 AD - died 4th century AD), also known as Paphnutius the Confessor, was a historical early Christian figure, said to be a disciple of Anthony the Great and a bishop of a city in the Upper Thebaid in the early fourth century. He is accounted by some as a prominent member of the First Council of Nicaea which took place in 325. The name of his see is unknown.

== Life ==
Paphnutius, an Egyptian, was a disciple of Saint Anthony the Great and later a bishop of a city in the Upper Thebaid in the early fourth century. He had been persecuted for his Christian beliefs, and had been hamstrung on the left side and suffered the loss of his right eye for the Faith under the Emperor Maximinus, and was subsequently condemned to the mines. According to some reports, at the First Council of Nicaea he was greatly honoured by Constantine the Great.

Paphnutius was present at the First Ecumenical Council, which took up the subject of clerical celibacy. It seems that most of the bishops present were disposed to follow the precedent of the Council of Elvira prohibiting conjugal relations to those bishops, priests, deacons, and sub-deacons who were married before ordination. Paphnutius, so certain ancient authors tell us, earnestly entreated his fellow-bishops not to impose this obligation on the orders of the clergy concerned. He proposed, in accordance "with the ancient tradition of the Church", that only those who were celibates at the time of ordination should continue to observe continence, but, on the other hand, that "none should be separated from her, to whom, while yet unordained, he had been united". The great veneration in which he was held, and the well-known fact that he had himself observed the strictest chastity all his life, gave weight to his proposal, which was later unanimously adopted. The council left it to the discretion of the married clergy to continue or discontinue their marital relations. In addition, Paphnutius was a zealous defender of orthodoxy in the face of the Arian heresy.

Paphnutius, Potomon of Heraclea, and 47 other Egyptian bishops accompanied Saint Athanasius to the First Synod of Tyre in 335 A.D.

His feast day in the Eastern Orthodox Church and Roman Catholic church is 11 September.

== Historicity ==
The very existence of Paphnutius is contested by the historian Friedrich Winkelmann, because he is never mentioned by Athanasius, who also battled against Arianism. Also, the Church History of Socrates Scholasticus, the earliest surviving source on Paphnutius, is one of the very few references for him in general.

His participation in the First Ecumenical Council was disputed several times, among others by Alfons Maria Cardinal Stickler, a canon law historian. Stickler argues that Paphnutius' presence at the council was never mentioned by the council's historian Eusebius of Caesarea, and that Socrates, who claims to have spoken personally to a member of the council, was born too late to have done so. He also points out that the Synod of Trullo (691) failed to mention the Paphnutius story when they allowed matrimony for priests.

On the other hand, there have also been several prominent scholars who defended the veracity of the Paphnutius story. The main arguments were laid down by Karl Josef von Hefele in his Conciliengeschichte (1855), and were taken up by his successor at the Tübingen Catholic faculty of theology Franz Xaver von Funk, as well as by some other eminent historians as Elphège Vacandard in the article on celibacy in the prestigious Dictionnaire de théologie catholique (1905) and Henri Leclercq in an article in the Histoire des conciles (1908). Vacandard's position found wide acceptance among the scholars. The original argument by Hefele is available below.

Alban Butler says, "On account of the silence of other writers, and on the testimonies of Saint Jerome, Saint Epiphanius, and others, Bellarmin and Orsi suspect that Socrates and Sozomen were misinformed in this story. There is, however, nothing repugnant in the narration; for it might seem unadvisable to make too severe a law at that time against some married men, who, in certain obscure churches, might have been ordained without such a condition."
