= British Library, Add MS 12150 =

British Library, Add MS 12150 is the second oldest extant Syriac manuscript and the oldest codex bearing a date in any language.

According to the original partially damaged colophon, the manuscript was copied in Edessa in the year 723 of the Seleucid era, that is, AD 411. In AD 1086 (Seleucid 1398), the colophon was copied onto a different folio. This copy preserves the name of scribe, Jacob. The manuscript was brought at some point to Baghdad and from there in 931 to the Deir al-Suryani in Egypt among some 250 manuscripts collected by Moses of Nisibis. It was among the manuscripts sent to Britain from Deir al-Suryani by Paul de Lagarde in 1838 and 1843. The codex is currently housed at the British Library, catalogued as number 12150 in the additional manuscripts collection.

The codex contains text of Pseudo-Clement's Recognitiones; Titus of Bostra's Four Discources Against the Manichaeans; Eusebius of Caesarea's On the Theophany, On the Confessors of Palestine and Eulogy of the Confessors' Virtue; and an anonymous martyrology. It has 255 parchment leaves (37 cm by 28.5 cm). The writing is in three columns per page, in 38–42 lines per column, in ʾesṭrangēlā script. The ink is black and brown.
