= P'ent'ay =

Name of Protestant denomination in Ethiopia and Eritrea

P'ent'ay (ጴንጤ) Wenigēlawī (ወንጌላዊ)
- Type: Eastern Christianity
- Classification: Eastern Protestant Christian
- Orientation: Pentecostal, Lutheran, Reformed, (Presbyterian, Congregationalist, Continental Reformed, Waldensians, Baptist Reformed, Calvinist Methodism, and Reformed Anglican), Baptist, Mennonite, Anglican, Adventist, Holiness, and Methodist.
- Polity: Congregationalist and Presbyterian
- Region: Ethiopia, Eritrea, United States, Canada, Norway, Sweden, Finland, Denmark, Germany, United Kingdom, Israel, Kenya, Australia, and other parts of the Ethiopian–Eritrean diaspora
- Language: Oromo, Amharic, Sidama, Tigrinya, and Ethiopian-Eritrean diaspora vernacular languages
- Founder: Peter Heyling
- Origin: 19th–20th centuries
- Members: ~16,500,000
- Other names: Ethiopian Evangelical Church, Eritrean Evangelical Church, Ethiopian Evangelicalism, Eritrean Evangelicalism
- Official website: Official ECFE website (english)

P'ent'ay (from Geʽez: ጴንጤ P̣enṭe) is an originally Amharic–Tigrinya language term for Pentecostal Christians. Today, the term refers to all Evangelical Protestant denominations and organisations in Ethiopian and Eritrean societies. Alternative terms include Ethiopian–Eritrean Evangelicalism or the Ethiopian–Eritrean Evangelical Church. Sometimes the denominations and organizations are known as Wenigēlawī (from Geʽez: ወንጌላዊ wängelawi "evangelical").

Evangelical Christianity was originally introduced by American and European Protestant missionary work, which began in the 19th century among various peoples, including Christians schismed from the Orthodox Tewahedo church, other branches of Christianity, or converted from non-Christian religions or traditional faith practices. Since the creation of P'ent'ay churches and organisations, prominent movements among them have been Pentecostalism, the Baptist tradition, Lutheranism, Methodism, Presbyterianism, the Mennonites, and the Eastern-oriented Protestant Christians within Ethiopia and Eritrea and the Ethiopian and Eritrean diaspora.

== Etymology ==
The term was coined in the late 1960s and was used as a pejorative for churches that believed in the Pentecostal experience and spiritual gifts of the Holy Spirit, used to describe local Protestant Christians who are not members of the Ethiopian Orthodox Tewahedo and Eritrean Orthodox Tewahedo churches (collectively known as the Orthodox Tewahedo).

The term P'ent'ay is derived from "Pentecostal"; however, it has since become a general shorthand referring to not only Evangelical Protestants but all Protestant denomination Christians, whether they are self-identified as Pentecostal or not. Some Orthodox Ethiopians will even apply the term to the small Catholic population of Ethiopia and Eritrea (but this is rare).

The equivalent rendition in many other languages is "Evangelical"; the term Wenigēlawī means "Evangelical" and has been used alongside P'ent'ay. Many of these groups describe their religious practices as culturally Eastern Christian, but Protestant Evangelical by doctrine.

== Denominations ==
The major Protestant denominations in Ethiopia and Eritrea are a group of indigenous, closely linked (part of the Amharic: አብያተ ክርስቲያናት, romanized: 'Abiate kristianat' – 'ābiyate kirisitīyanati' or community of churches) Baptist, Lutheran, Pentecostal, and Mennonite denominations.

=== Primary denominations ===
- The Ethiopian Kale Heywet (Word of Life) Church, a charismatic Evangelical Protestant denomination with Pentecostal and Baptist roots. It is associated with the Sudan Interior Mission, an interdenominational organization, and has an Eritrean branch.
- The Ethiopian Evangelical Church Mekane Yesus (Place of Jesus), a Lutheran denomination which includes a Presbyterian-leaning synod. The Eritrean Evangelical Church Mekane Yesus is the Eritrean Lutheran branch of this Evangelical Protestant denomination. The Ethiopian Lutheran denomination is the largest non-united Lutheran Christian denomination in the world (see list of Christian denominations by number of members).
- The Evangelical Lutheran Church of Eritrea, a Lutheran denomination which joined the Lutheran World Federation in 1963.
- The Ethiopian Full Gospel Believers' Church, a Pentecostal denomination with Mennonite influence.
- The Meserete Kristos (Christ Foundation) Church, a Mennonite denomination with Pentecostal influence.

Some P'ent'ay communities—especially the Mekane Yesus Lutheran Church for example—have been influenced by the Orthodox Tewahedo churches, which represents the dominant traditional Ethiopian and Eritrean Christian demographic, but for the most part are very Pentecostal in their worship and theology.

==== Other denominations ====
- Ammanuel Baptist Church
- Misgana Church of Ethiopia
- Assemblies of God – Pentecostal
- Hiwot Berhan Church (Light of Life Church)
- Emnet Kristos
- Berhane Wongel – Gospel Light
- Christian Brethren
- Ethiopian Addis Kidan Baptist Church
- Evangelical Church of Eritrea
- Lutheran Church of Eritrea
- Middle East General Mission
- Seventh-day Adventist Church
- Anglicanism is represented in Ethiopia and Eritrea by the Episcopal Church in Jerusalem and the Middle East and Episcopal Anglican Province of Alexandria; Ethiopia and Eritrea are both part of the Diocese of Egypt, which also includes other countries in the Horn of Africa as well as the North Africa region. There are two Episcopal churches in Ethiopia, one is in Addis Ababa and the other in Gambela, while in Eritrea there are no officially operated congregations at this time.

=== Unity and the ECFE ===
The ECFE, or Evangelical Church Fellowship of Ethiopia, is a consortium of born-again, Trinitarian Christians. The ECFE has 22 member churches, and based on 2004 statistics, 11.5 million members. All P'ent'ay churches, regardless of denomination, are domestically known as አብያተ ክርስቲያናት (Abiate kristianat' or ābiyate kirisitīyanati') meaning 'churches' in the senses of a 'community of Christians' in Amharic, the official working federal language of Ethiopia. Most of these denominations also operate ministries, colleges and bible societies like the Ethiopian Graduate School of Theology, Golden Oil Ministries, Evangelical Theological College, the Ethiopian Bible Society and Meserete Kristos College. These churches often work together by exchanging preachers and organizing church conferences.

=== Statistics ===
According to the 2005 statistics from the World Christian Database, Ethiopian Pentecostal/Charismatic members cover a bit over 16 percent of the country as P'ent'ays of Ethiopia. The individual groups are the Word of Life Church (Kale Heywet) Church, Mekane Yesus, Churches of Christ, Misgana Church of Ethiopia, Assembly of God, Hiwot Berhan Church, Emnet Kristos, Meserete Kristos, Light of Life Church, Mulu Wongel (Full Gospel Believers Church) and other churches constituting slightly over 12 million P'ent'ays in Ethiopia. However, according to World Christian Encyclopedia, the Evangelical Protestant community is down to only 13.6% of Ethiopian population. According to the 1994 government census, Protestant Christians comprise 10% of the population (about 7–8 million today). According to membership and adherent records provided by the various churches and denominations, Ethiopian Protestants claim as high as 18.59% of the country's population which is inline with the recent data from the US Department of State.

== Beliefs ==
Evangelicals in Ethiopia and Eritrea believe that one is saved by believing in Jesus as Lord and Saviour for the forgiveness of sins. They believe in the Father, the Son and the Holy Spirit, the one essence of the Trinity. Like all other Christian groups that accept the canonical gospels, P'ent'ays also believe in being "born again" (dagem meweled), as it is written numerous times in the Gospel of John, and demonstrated by one's baptism in the Holy Spirit as well as water baptism. Speaking in tongues is seen as one of the signs, but not the only sign, of "receiving Christ", which should include a new lifestyle and social behavior.

Although almost all Evangelical Protestant branches in Ethiopia and Eritrea have one or two theological differences or different approaches in the interpretation of the Bible, all of the four major branches follow the beliefs common to born-again Christians. The four major denominations also exchange pastors (megabi) and allow the preachers to serve in different churches when invited (full communion). All of the four main churches and others also share and listen to various gospel singers, mezmur (gospel music or hymn) producers and choirs.

== History ==
Peter Heyling was the first Protestant missionary in Ethiopia, and is regarded as the founding father of the P'ent'ay or Wenigēlawī movement.

For the most part, Ethiopian and Eritrean Protestants state that their form of Christianity is both the reformation of the current Orthodox Tewahedo churches as well as the restoration of it to the original Ethiopian Christianity. They believe Ethiopian Orthodox Christianity was paganized after the 960s, during the reign of queen Gudit, who destroyed and burned most of the church's possessions and scriptures. They claim those events have led to the gradual paganization of the Oriental Orthodox Churches which they say is now merely dominated by rituals, hearsay and fables. P'ent'ay Christians use the alleged "secularized teaching" of the current Ethiopian and Eritrean Orthodox churches, the alleged inability of most Orthodox followers to live according to the instructions of the Bible and the deuterocanonical books used by rural priests, as a proof to their belief in the Orthodox Tewahedo teaching is also mainly syncretized. P'ent'ay Christians use the history of the Ethiopian Orthodox Christianity prior to the 1960s as their own history, despite lacking historical continuity.

It was only during the early 20th century that American and European missionaries spread Protestantism with Mennonite and Pentecostal churches through the Sudan Interior Mission (SIM). When the SIM continued its movement after a brief ban during Ethiopia's war with Italy, it is written that the missionaries were taken aback by the fruits of their initial mission. Protestant Christians still face persecution in rural regions and are assisted by the Voice of the Martyrs; however, there is a growing tolerance between the Ethiopian Orthodox, Muslims and the growing population of P'en'tay Christians in the urban areas of the country. With the dominance of the Ethiopian Orthodox Tewahedo and the growing Muslim population, the population of P'en'tay Christians was estimated around 16.15 million (19 percent of total population), according to the information released by the U.S. Department of State.

== Obstacles ==
=== Confusion with non-affiliates ===
Recent misidentification of certain groups as P'ent'ay has caused confusion. One controversy involves Oneness Pentecostalism and Jehovah's Witnesses, which are strictly opposed by the other Protestant denominations.

The metropolitan sui iuris Eastern Catholic particular churches of the Eritrean Catholic Church and Ethiopian Catholic Church are not P'ent'ay (Evangelical Protestant) churches but some Orthodox Tewahedo adherents have used the term P'ent'ay as a pejorative by conflating and 'othering' them with P'ent'ay (Evangelical Protestants).

=== Persecution ===
According to Voice of the Martyrs there have been brutal killings of P'ent'ay Christians in rural areas that tend to be overlooked by the Ethiopian rural officials and stay undisclosed to international organizations. Some Oriental Orthodox families expel children out of their house if the children convert to Protestantism. Since the majority population is Orthodox, Voice of the Martyrs claims no criminal investigations are carried out against Oriental Orthodox mobs who burn Evangelical churches, destroy houses and even murder P'ent'ay Christians.

Voice of the Martyrs also states that Evangelical Christians have been murdered by Islamic militants because they wouldn't renounce their faith in Christ. Islamic militants have stopped at least one bus (near Jijiga, a rural area) and demanded Christians recite the Islamic creed, killing those who refuse. The mostly rural churches like Kale Heywet have historically faced persecution with aggressors often doing so with impunity. During the previous 1970s and 1980s government, persecution was equally severe in the urban cities as well, with the likes of Mulu Wongel church (Full Gospel) and Mesereke Kristos Church facing widespread persecution and mass imprisonments and killings. Lacking western ties, the Mulu Wongel church was outlawed by the Derg Ethiopian government.

More persecution followed Ethiopian Protestants for more than a decade. However, after a change of government, religious equality including the right to worship, build churches and evangelize were restored. Minor and rural issues still exist. Despite these issues, compared to the past, the 1990s have brought the most freedom of religion in Ethiopia. Most of the Evangelical churches, especially Mulu Wongel, Assemblies of God, and Kale Heywet, faced persecution and detentions by previous governments. The state sponsored persecution of Protestants by the 1980s government created what some scholars call an "invisible church" and an underground evangelism where the membership of these churches drastically increased despite this era of persecution.

Since the early 1990s, persecution has mostly ceased, particularly in the cities and areas near the cities, and there is a growing level of tolerance between Evangelical Christians and other religious groups. The ruling party however established a Faith and Religious Affairs Directorate (similar to those in China) to issue licenses, to demand loyalty, and to infiltrate hierarchies of Christian and Islamic institutions. Even though it is not comparable to the state sponsored persecution of the past, P'ent'ay Christians in Ethiopia still face persecution from private citizens in Muslim dominated rural areas. Despite Ethiopia's well-known religious tolerance, culture related acceptance issues and the growth of some Evangelical churches have also led to some violence, especially as non-Orthodox Christians and Muslims seek to gain equal economic and social status as the traditionally privileged Orthodox Christians.

New challenges Christians face in Ethiopia include the Islamic fundamentalism movement mostly coming from radical Islamist organizations or followers of an extreme form of Wahhabist Islam coming from Saudi Arabia-linked Muslim Non-governmental organizations and projects. In Eritrea, torture is used against Protestant Christians, more than 2000 Christians are subject to arrest (2006). The U. S. state department names it a Country of Particular Concern due to its violation of religious liberty. It has been reported that entire families are thrown into jail. According to the Barnabas Fund, in April 2010 a 28-year-old student died after she was held in a metal shipping container for 2 years, after being arrested for attending a Bible study.

== Hymns ==
Music, more technically speaking "hymns" or "psalms" (Mezmur — መዝሙር – in Amharic, the official language of Ethiopia, and also in other Ethiopian-Eritrean languages as well) plays a big role in preaching and the daily life of P'ent'ay/Evangelical Christians. With the belief that music should be for God, and him alone, Ethiopian mezmur does not have ethnic or cultural boundaries, nor restriction on what style or instruments to use. However, there are apparent influences from American evangelicals that have led to commercialization and cross-overs. CD, cassette and DVD sales are now one of the rare Ethiopian industries on the rise.

=== History of P'ent'ay music ===
Even though some of the older generation of singers didn't have the financial means to make cassettes, they have influenced Ethiopian music in various ways while singing in local churches. Some of the early singers are Addisu Worku, Leggesse Watro, the Araya Family who used to sing on Misrach Dimts Radio.

Mekane Yesus Church led the way in translating hymnals from the Swedish and adapting from Ethiopian Orthodox Tewahedo Church. In the early 1970s the Meserete Kristos Church Choir was established. Some from Tsion Choir from Mulu Wongel joined the newly established choir and Meserete Kristos continued developing songs in Ethiopian languages. During these early years, other groups like Bethel singers also produced Ethiopian gospel songs.

=== Early comers ===
Some of the early comers were Mulu Wongel and Meserete Kristos choirs, which now have up to Choir E and F, with each having 8, 9 albums. Some of these churches in other branch cities have stopped using single letters for choir names, and applied names instead. Other early comers Mekane Yesus church choir, Mulu Wengel church choir, Meserete Kristos church (MKC) choir arrived around the 1970s. Solo vocalists developed fast in these and other churches. Addisu Worku, Dereje Kebede, Tamrat Walba, Tesfaye Gabisso, Eyerusalem Teshome, Tamerate Haile, Tadesse Eshete, Gizachew Worku, Atalay Alem and Shewaye Damte fill in some of this list that started early.

=== Modern ===
Some of the late 20th century singers include Kalkidan Tilahun (Lily) of Qale Hiywet Church, Ahavah Gospel Singers, Dagmawi Tilahun (Dagi) of Mulu Wongel Church and Elias Abebe of the Assemblies of God church. Others are Awtaru Kebede, Sophia Shibabaw, Mesfin Gutu, Mihiret Itefa, Lealem Tilahun (Lali), Gezahegn Muse, Azeb Hailu and many more. There are also singers who are pastors, some of them are Dawit Molalign, Kasshaun Lemma and Yohannes Girma. Oromo language singers like Kabaa Fidoo, Abbabaa Tamesgeen, Iyoob Yaadataa, Baacaa Bayyanaa, Magarsaa Baqqalaa, Dastaa Insarmuu, Bilisee Karrasaa, and others have also served Evangelical Churches in southwestern Ethiopia. In the Tigrinya language, there are singers like Yonas Haile, Mihret Gebretatios, Selam Hagos, Ruth Mekuria, Yemane Habte, and Adhanom Teklemariam and duos like Yonatan and Sosuna. Introducing new styles are young performers like Dawit "Danny" Wolde who studied at Berklee College of Music.

Classical and instrumental gospel songs have also flourished with Fikru Aligaz and Bethel Music Ministry. Also, Fikru Aligaz has been providing a three-day praise and worship service with the Bethel Praise & Worship Choir to reach local Christian and Non-Christian members of the community twice a year since 1998. Duos like Aster & Endalkachewu or Geta Yawkal & Berektawit bring more variety. Also, formerly secular singers like Hirut Bekele, Solomon Disasa and Muluken have produced gospel songs after they convert and become born-again Christians. There are many music composers in P'ent'ay church like Christian Girma (currently living in Denver, Colorado), Ebenezer Girma, Enku Girma, Nathanael Befikadu, Biruk Bedru, Daniel Ewnetu, Bereket Tesfaye, Samson Tamrat, Yabets Tesema, Ameha Mekonen, Endalkachew Hawaz, Estifanos Mengistu, and there are countless church music players. Digital music composition is used and there are more than twenty Christian music studios in Ethiopia, including CMM, TDS, COMNS, Sami, Nati, Langanoo, Begena, Kinnei, Albastor, Shalom, Exodus, and Bethlehem.

There are also gospel singers who sing in Wolayta, Hadiya-Kambata, Sidama, and other areas of the South.

==== Modern musical controversy within the Church ====
Some of the most famous music players in Ethiopia like Elias Melka, played in Evangelical churches has subsequently converted to secular music. Some modern singers often mimic American Evangelical artists, allegedly including other lifestyles that are not genuine depictions of traditional Ethiopian Evangelicalism. The tradition of local church group choirs, has to an extent been supplanted by individual solo singers who have controversially gained celebrity status with their lifestyles often resembling secular celebrities.

== See also ==
- Christianity in Eritrea
- Protestantism in Ethiopia
- Religion in Eritrea
- Religion in Ethiopia
