= Moses of Nisibis =

Moses (or Mushe) of Nisibis (fl. 904–943) was a West Syriac monk and scribe. He was the abbot (riš dayro) of Dayr al-Suryan, the Syrian monastery in the Wadi al-Natrun in Egypt, from 914 at the latest. He brought together and helped preserve one of the most important collections of ancient Syriac manuscripts, which is still of critical importance to scholars today.

Moses is first attested as a scribe of Dayr al-Suryan in 903 or 904. He acquired for the monastery a 6th-century copy of the Peshitta, the Syriac Bible, from a family of Tikrit in 906 or 907. It is now kept in the British Library, Add MS 12142. As abbot, Moses undertook major renovations of the interior of the monastery. The screens separating the sanctuary and the choir from the nave in the main church were put up during his abbacy. They are still standing. He also had the murals decorating the apse painted and the chapel dedicated to the Forty-Nine Martyrs of Scetis built. Moses is mentioned by name in two inscriptions commemorating the renovations dating to 914 and 926 or 927. A Coptic inscription in the dome of the main church also refers to Moses: Papa Moyses pi-hikoymenos, "Father Moses the abbot".

In 925, the new governor to Egypt, Takin al-Khazari, imposed the poll tax on Christians who had until then been exempt (bishops, monks and the infirm). To protest this change of policy, the monasteries of Egypt elected Moses of Dayr al-Suryan to be their envoy to the Caliph al-Muqtadir in Baghdad. He went east with a delegation around 926 or 927 and remained there for five years, navigating the caliphal bureaucracy and acquiring books for his monastic library. He appears to have stayed there for some time after successfully completing his mission. He returned to Egypt in 931 or 932. The story of his embassy is recorded in the notes of several Syriac manuscripts and by the Muslim historian al-Maqrizi.

Moses brought back 250 Syriac codices collected in northern Syria and Mesopotamia, in places like Tikrit, Reshaina and Harran. They were both purchased and received as gifts. Most of these were distributed to western libraries in the 18th and 19th centuries, and only a small portion of the collection remains in Dayr al-Suryan today. Moses added a note to each of the codices describing how it was acquired. Some of these are quite long. Sometimes they were placed over previous notes, thus destroying records of the manuscripts' earlier history. It is only from Moses' collection that complete Syriac texts of the works of Ephrem and Aphrahat survive. Among these 250 was also British Library, Add MS 12150, the oldest dated codex in any language.

The latest mention of Moses as abbot is found in a note to another Syriac biblical manuscript in the British Library, Add MS 14525, which dates to 943 or 944.

== Bibliography ==
- Blanchard, M. J. (1995). "Moses of Nisibis (fl. 906–943) and the Library of Deir Suriani". In L. S. B. MacCoull (ed.). Studies in the Christian East in Memory of Mirrit Boutros Ghali. Society for Coptic Archaeology. pp. 13–24.
- Brock, Sebastian P. (2004). "Without Mushē of Nisibis, Where Would We Be? Some Reflections on the Transmissionof Syriac Literature". Journal of Eastern Christian Studies. 56 (1–4): 15–24. doi:10.2143/JECS.56.1.578692.
- Brock, Sebastian P. (2012). "Abbot Mushe of Nisibis, Collector of Syriac Manuscripts". In C. Baffioni; R. B. Finazzi; A. Passoni Dell'Acqua; E. Vergani (eds.). Gli studi orientalistici in Ambrosiana nella cornice del IV centenario, 1609–2009: primo dies academicus, 8–10 novembre 2010. Biblioteca Ambrosiana. pp. 15–32.
- Grossmann, Peter; Cody, Aelred (1991). "Dayr Al-Suryan". In Aziz Suryal Atiya (ed.). The Coptic Encyclopedia. Vol. 3. New York: Macmillan Publishers. cols. 876a–881a.
- Kelly, Christopher (2018). "Deir al-Suryani". In Oliver Nicholson (ed.). The Oxford Dictionary of Late Antiquity. Vol. 1. Oxford University Press. pp. 470–471.
- Kominko, Maja (2015). "Crumb Trails, Threads and Traces: Endangered Archives and History". In Maja Kominko (ed.). From Dust to Digital: Ten Years of the Endangered Archives Programme. Open Book Publishers. pp. xlix–lxviii. ISBN 9781783740628.
- Leroy, Jules (1974). "Moïse de Nisibe". In Ignatius Ortiz de Urbina (ed.). Symposium Syriacum, 1972: célebré dans les jours 26–31 octobre 1972 à l'Institut Pontifical Oriental de Rome. Pontificium Institutum Orientalium Studiorum. pp. 457–470.
- Van Rompay, Lucas (2018). "Mushe of Nisibis". In Sebastian P. Brock; Aaron M. Butts; George A. Kiraz; Lucas Van Rompay (eds.). Gorgias Encyclopedic Dictionary of the Syriac Heritage: Electronic Edition. Beth Mardutho. Originally published by Gorgias Press in 2011.
