= Martyrology of 411 =

5th-century Eastern Christian text

The Martyrology of 411 is the oldest Eastern Christian martyrology. It is a work of Syriac literature, and it is a dual list of Christian "martyrs of the West" and "martyrs of the East". The western list is arranged by day and month of the year, beginning with Saint Stephen on 26 December and ending with Peter of Alexandria on 24 November. The eastern list contains some Persian martyr acts, especially the martyrs of Persia under Shapur II during the Forty-Year Persecution in the Sasanian Empire. It is arranged not by date but by position in the Church of the East.

Despite its early date, the Martyrology of 411 does not stand at the head of the eastern martyrological tradition. Rather, it is related to the western tradition as represented in the Martyrologium Hieronymianum. It is a translation of a Greek martyrology of about 362, which was also used as a source for the Martyrologium Hieronymianum. The latest saints included date from the reign of Julian the Apostate (361–363) and may be later additions not found in the original Greek text.

== Manuscripts ==
The Martyrology of 411 is preserved in one of the oldest Syriac manuscripts, British Library, Add MS 12150, dated to November 411.

== Bibliography ==
- Winkler, Dietmar W. (2003). "Syriac Literature". The Church of the East: A Concise History. Translated by Miranda G. Henry. RoutledgeCurzon. pp. 158–164.
- Nau, François (1993) [1912]. Un martyrologe et douze menologes syriaques (PDF). Patrologia Orientalis. Vol. X, Fasc. 1, No. 46. Brepols.
- Nicholson, Oliver P. (2018). "Martyrology of 411, Syriac". In Oliver Nicholson (ed.). The Oxford Dictionary of Late Antiquity. Vol. 2. Oxford University Press. p. 976.
- Thomson, Simon C. (2019). "The Overlooked Women of the Old English Passion of Saint Christopher". Medievalia et Humanistica. 44: 61–80.
- Wright, William (1866). "An Ancient Syrian Martyrology". Journal of Sacred Literature and Biblical Record. 8 (16): 423–432.
