= Monastery of Saint Mary Deipara =

Coptic Orthodox monastery located in Wadi El Natrun in Egypt

Monastery of Saint Mary El-Sourian
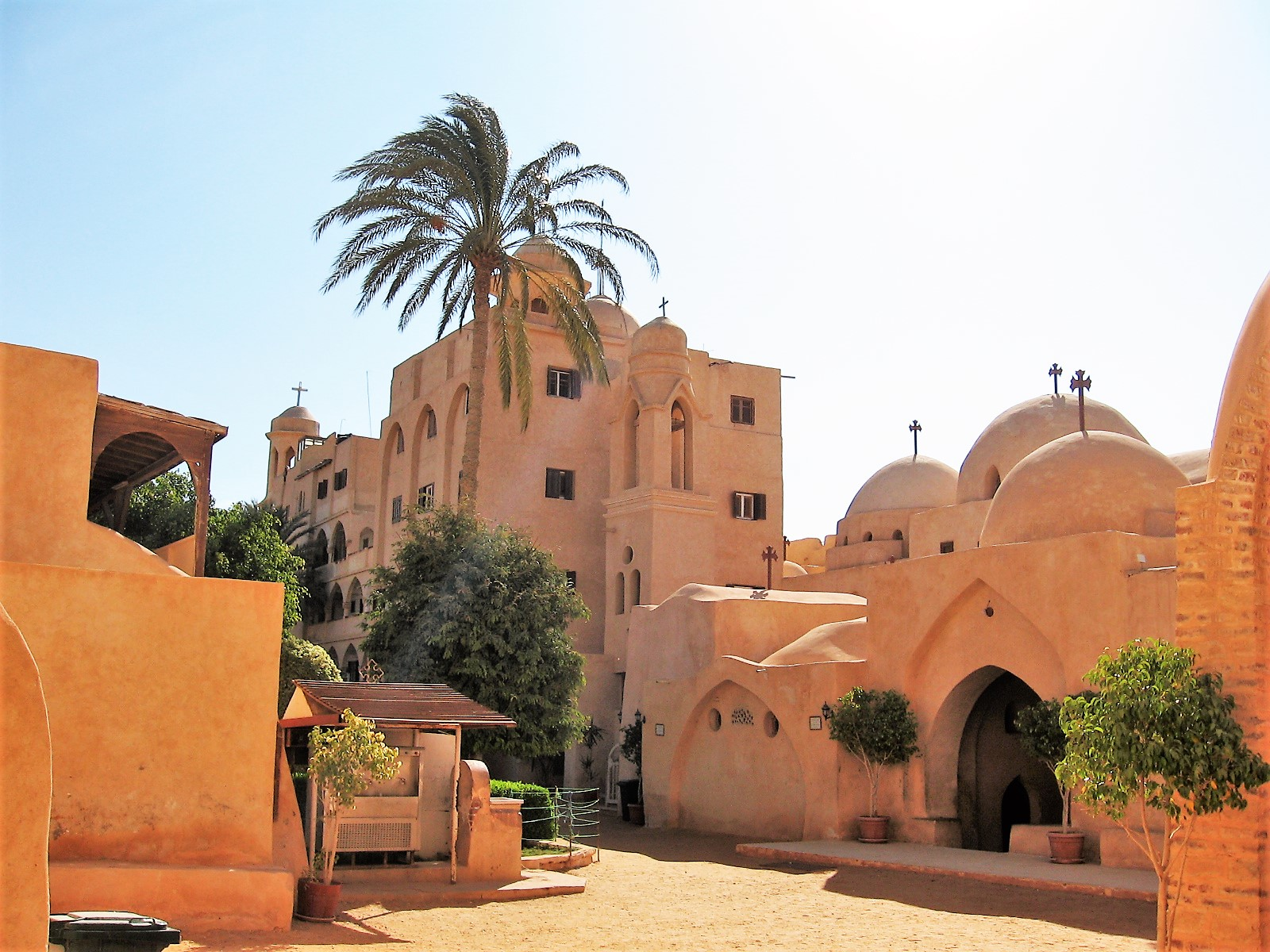

- Location within Egypt
- Interactive map of Monastery of Saint Mary El-Sourian

Monastery information
- Other name: Deir al-Sourian
- Established: 6th century
- Dedication: Virgin Mary
- Diocese: Coptic Orthodox Church of Alexandria

People
- Founder: Syriac monks
- Important associated figures: Pope Gabriel VII; Pope Shenouda III; Saint John Kame

Site
- Location: Wadi El Natrun
- Country: Egypt
- Coordinates: 30°19′04″N 30°21′15″E
- Public access: Yes

The Monastery of Saint Mary of the Syrians is a Coptic Orthodox monastery located in Wadi El Natrun in the Nitrian Desert, Beheira Governorate, Egypt. It is located about 500 meters northwest of the Monastery of Saint Pishoy.

The monastery is dedicated to the Virgin Mary and carries her name. In scholarly references from the nineteenth century it is generally called the convent or monastery of Saint Mary Deipara. It is better known nowadays as the Syriac Monastery or the monastery of the Syriacs (Arabic: Dayr al-Suryān) because it was mainly used by monks of the Syriac Orthodox Church from the 8th to the 14th century.

== Etymology, foundation and ancient history ==
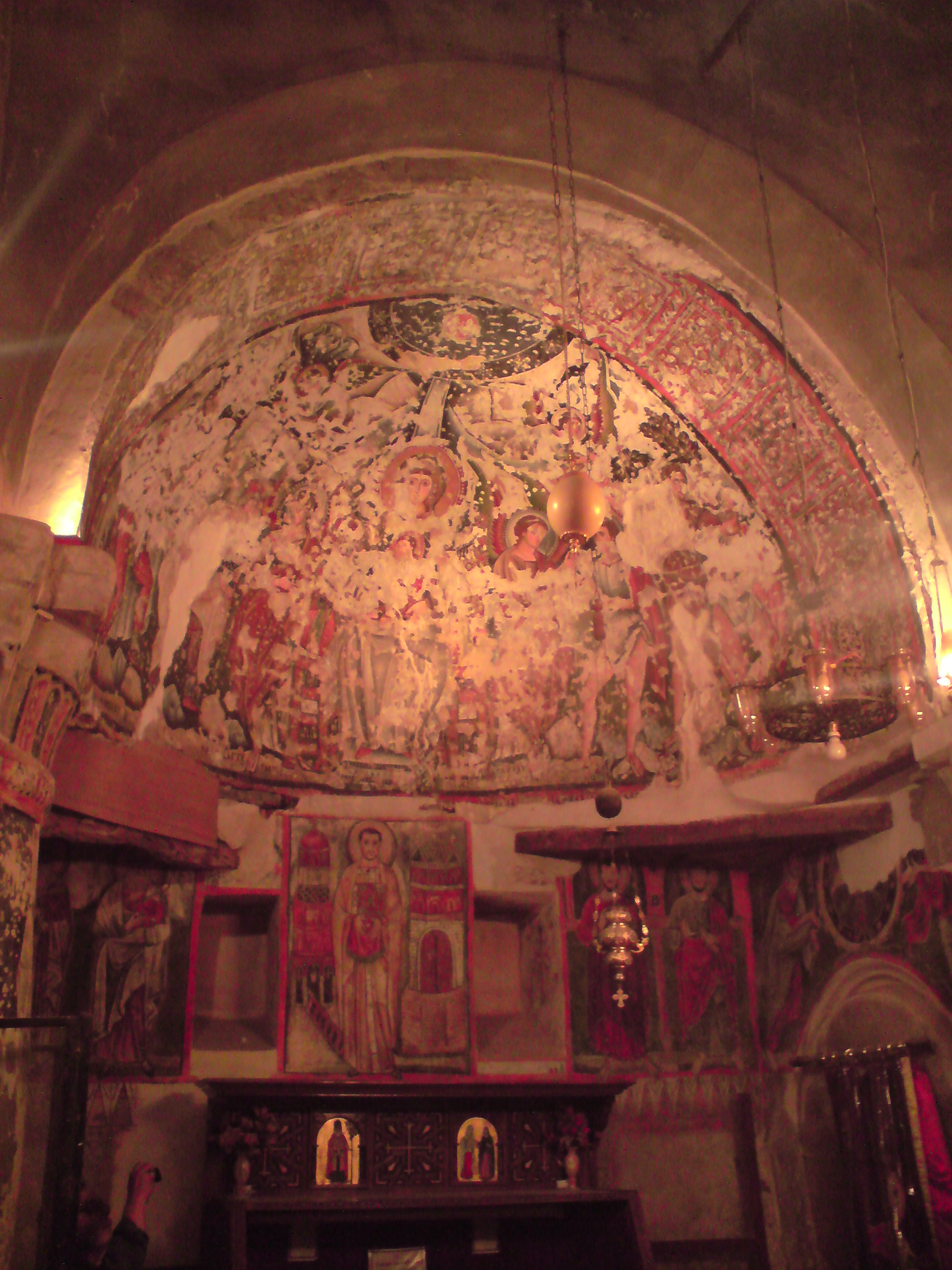
Frescos from the Syrian monastery of Wadi Natrun.

The exact date of the monastery's foundation is unknown. Most sources seem however to agree that its foundation took place in the sixth century AD. The establishment of the monastery is closely connected to the Julianist heresy, which spread in Egypt during the papacy of Pope Timothy III of Alexandria. The Julianists believed in the incorruptibility of Christ's body. This was in contradiction with the teaching of the Orthodox Church, which held that Christ had taken human flesh that prevented him from being ideal and abstract, and therefore corruptible. Yet, in the monasteries of Scetes, a majority of the monks embraced the Julian heresy. In reaction, those who did not follow the heresy obtained permission from the governor Aristomachus to erect new churches and monasteries, so that they could settle apart from the Julianists. These new facilities were often built alongside the old ones, even keeping the same name but adding to it the word Theotokos, thus recognizing the significance of the incarnation, which the Julians seemed to minimize. The Syrian Monastery was therefore established by those monks of the Monastery of Saint Pishoy who rejected the Julian heresy. At the time of its construction, they called it the Monastery of the Holy Virgin Theotokos.

Towards the beginning of the eighth century AD, the monastery was sold to a group of wealthy Syriac merchants from Tikrit, who had settled in Cairo, for 12,000 dinars. These merchants converted the monastery for use by Syrian monks, and rebaptized it Monastery of the Holy Virgin of the Syrians. This could be one of the sources of the monastery's modern name. Yet, it is also possible that the monastery had already been inhabited by Syrian monks since the fourth century AD, which could trace the monastery's name to that period.

The Syrian Monastery, like the rest of the monasteries in Scetes, was subject to fierce attacks by desert Bedouins and Berbers. The fifth of these attacks, which took place in 817 AD, was particularly disastrous to this monastery. The monastery was then rebuilt in 850 AD by two monks, named Matthew and Abraham.

In 927 AD, one of the monastery's monks, known as Moses of Nisibis, traveled to Baghdad to ask the Abbasid caliph Al-Muqtadir to grant tax exemption to the monasteries. Moses then traveled through Syria region and Mesopotamia in search of manuscripts. After three years of traveling, he returned to Egypt, bringing with him 250 Syriac manuscripts. This made of the Syrian Monastery a prosperous and important facility, possessing many artistic treasures and a library rich in Syriac texts.

Inside the monastery, there is a large door known as the Door of Prophecies or Gate of Prophecies, that features symbolic diagrams depicting the past and the future of the Christian faith through the eyes of Christian monks of the tenth century.

== Medieval history ==
Based on a census taken by Mawhub ibn Mansur ibn Mufarrig, the co-author of the History of the Patriarchs of Alexandria, the Syrian Monastery had some sixty monks in 1088 AD. It was the third at the time in the Nitrian Desert, after the Monastery of Saint Macarius the Great and the Monastery of Saint John the Dwarf.

In the middle of the twelfth century, the Syrian Monastery witnessed a period of trouble, when no Syrian priest was present. However, in 2000 an inscription from 1285/1286 was found, "which recorded building or other activities in the Monastery". This may have reflected an influx of Syrian refugees in the 1250s. In the fourteenth century, the monastery was decimated by the plague. When a monk named Moses from the Monastery of Mar Gabriel in Tur Abdin visited the monastery in 1413 AD, he found only one remaining Syrian monk.

Towards the end of the fifteenth century, the Patriarch of Antioch visited the Syrian Monastery, granting it many privileges and donations, in order to restore it to its former glory. However, Egyptian monks continued to populate the monastery and, by 1516 AD, only 18 out of 43 monks were Syrian. By the time of Pope Gabriel VII of Alexandria, who himself had been a monk at the Syrian Monastery, it was able to supply ten monks to the Monastery of Saint Paul the Anchorite and twenty to the Monastery of Saint Anthony in the Eastern Desert when those two communities were damaged by Bedouin raids.

In the seventeenth century, western travelers from France, Germany and England visited the monastery and reported that there were two churches, one for the Syrians and one for the Egyptians (Copts). They also mention a miraculous Tree of Saint Ephrem. According to tradition, Saint Ephrem was a fourth-century Syrian theologian and ascetic from Nisibis. He sought to meet the holy monk Saint Pishoy, and thus came to the monastic centers of Scetes. When the two men met, they were unable to communicate because Ephrem spoke only Syriac. Yet, suddenly and miraculously, Saint Pishoy began to express himself in that language, enabling his visitor to understand him. During this exchange, it is said that Saint Ephrem leaned his staff against the door of the hermitage and all at once it became rooted and even sprouted foliage. Near the church of the Holy Virgin, monks will continue to point out even today this tamarind, miraculously born from Ephrem's staff.

When Peter Heyling, a Lutheran missionary from Lübeck, and Yusuf Simaan Assemani, a Lebanese envoy of Pope Clement XI of Rome, visited the Syrian monastery between the mid-seventeenth and mid-eighteenth centuries, they found no Syrian monks living in it. The latter managed to acquire forty precious manuscripts from the monastery's library, which are kept today in the Vatican Library.

== Modern history ==
Between 1839 and 1851, the British Museum in London was able to purchase about five hundred Syriac manuscripts from the monastery's library, concerned not only with religious topics, but also with philosophy and literature. Famous visitors to the monastery during this time included Lansing (1862), Chester (1873), Junkers (1875), Jullien (1881) and Butler (1883).

The manuscripts found in the Syrian monastery inspired intense research on the Syriac language and culture, for until that time, many classical texts from Aristotle, Euclid, Archimedes, Hippocrates and Galen were known to Western scholars only in their thirteenth-century Latin translations. Even these were often translations from earlier Arabic sources. These documents are the oldest copies of important Greek classical texts, with some dating back to the fifth century.

Today, the Syrian monastery provides a great opportunity to study the development of Coptic wall painting. Between 1991 and 1999, several segments of wall paintings layered on top of each other were uncovered in the Church of the Holy Virgin and the Chapel of the Forty-Nine Martyrs, dating from between the seventh and the thirteenth centuries. There is currently an ongoing project to uncover, restore and conserve wall paintings within the monastery.

The monastery is enclosed by a large wall, built towards the end of the ninth century, and whose height varies between 9.5 and 11.5 meters. The monastery also includes a keep (tower) and a refectory. The five churches inside the monastery are named after the Virgin Mary (2 of the churches), the Forty-Nine Martyrs, Saints Honnos and Marutha, and Saint John the Dwarf.

== Popes from the Syrian Monastery ==
1. Pope Gabriel VII (1525–1570)
2. Pope Shenouda III (1971–2012)

== Abbots ==
List of the Abbots of the Monastery from the 6th century to the present, with their names, surnames/epithets in "", priestly rank, and reign ():

- Theodore I; (6th century)
- Marota "bin Habib"; (720)
- Joseph I; (773)
- Ibn 'Eidi; (contemporary of Pope Cosmas II of Alexandria)
- John I "bin Maqari", Presbyter; (894)
- Moses "al-Nasibi", Presbyter; (early 10th Century)
- Saliba, Presbyter; (contemporary of Pope Abraham of Alexandria)
- David, Presbyter; (1007)
- John II, Presbyter; (11th Century)
- Basil, Presbyter; (1222)
- Joshua, Hegumen; (1237-1254)
- Abd el-Massih, Hegumen; (contemporary of Pope Mathew II)
- Severus I "Kyriakos", Metropolitan Bishop; (1484)
- Severus II, Metropolitan Bishop; (1516)
- Lazarus, Presbyter
- Constantine I, Presbyter; (abdicated and retired to the Monastery of Saint Anthony)
- Constantine II, Presbyter
- John III, Hegumen; (~1584)
- Abd el-Massih II "al-Anbeiri", Hegumen; (1665, he later became Metropolitan of Ethiopia)
- John IV, Hegumen; (1684)
- Michael, Hegumen; (1720)
- Gabriel, Hegumen
- Peter, Hegumen; (was the Abbot for all of Scetis, he later became Metropolitan of Girga)
- Manqarious, Hegumen (was later consecrated as Metropolitan Peter of Manfalut and Abnub)
- Qulta "the Scribe", Hegumen; (1784)
- John V "al-Fayumi", Hegumen
- Abd el-Qudus, Hegumen; (1848)
- Joseph II "al-Mahalawi", Hegumen
- John VI "Bishara", Hegumen; (was later consecrated as Bishop Mathew of Abu-Teig)
- Theodore II, Hegumen
- John VII "al-Esnawi", Hegumen; (was later consecrated as Bishop Serapamon of Khartoum and Omdurman)
- Maximus "Salib", Hegumen; (1897-1939)
- Philotheos "Morqos", Hegumen; (1939-1947)
- Theophiles, Bishop; (1948-1989)
- Matthew, Bishop; (1993–Present)

== Other monasteries of the Nitrian Desert ==
- The Monastery of Saint Pishoy
- The Monastery of Saint Macarius the Great
- The Paromeos Monastery

== See also ==
- Door of Prophecies
- Coptic Orthodox Church of Alexandria
- Desert Fathers
- Wadi El Natrun
