= Martyrologium Hieronymianum =

5th-century Christian text

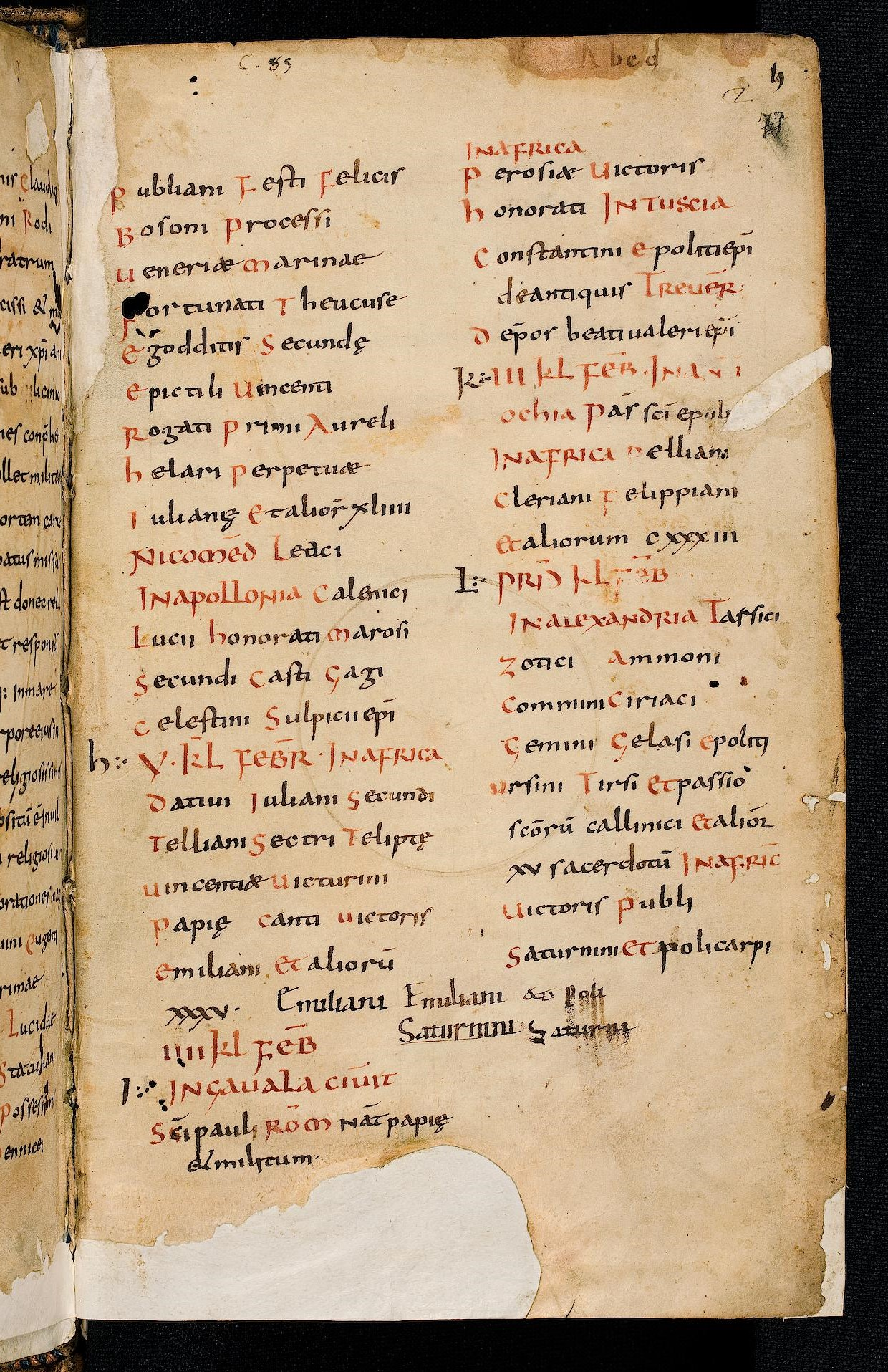
A page from an early 9th-century copy of the Martyrologium Hieronymianum made at the Abbey of Lorsch

The Martyrologium Hieronymianum (meaning "martyrology of Jerome") or Martyrologium sancti Hieronymi (meaning "martyrology of Saint Jerome") is an ancient martyrology or list of Christian martyrs in calendar order, one of the most used and influential of the Middle Ages. It is the oldest surviving general or "universal" martyrology, and the precursor of all later Western martyrologies.

Pseudepigraphically attributed to Saint Jerome, the Martyrologium Hieronymianum contains a reference to him derived from the opening chapter of his Life of Malchus (392 AD) where Jerome states his intention to write a history of the saints and martyrs from the apostolic times: "I decided to write [a history, mentioned earlier] from the coming of the saviour up to our age, that is, from the apostles, up to the dregs of our time".

== Date and textual history ==
The Martyrologium Hieronymianum appears to have drawn for its material on the existing calendar of Rome, on one from Africa, and on a compilation made in Greek around the year 362 A.D. and which used as a major source the details found regarding the martyrs in works of Eusebius of Caesarea. The contents of the 362 AD compilation are known to us from an untidy Syriac translation, the Martyrology of AD 411. It is the geographical spread of the sources which gave this pioneering martyrology its general or "universal" character. Nevertheless, on account precisely of this non-local character and because the date of the final compilation considerably postdates the end of the main anti-Christian persecutions, the antiquity of much of the information gathered is undermined by the inevitable errors caused by multiple compilers and by scribes to whom the persons mentioned could not have been personally known. It appears that the initial Latin text was fabricated in Northern Italy, probably within the Patriarchate of Aquileia, in the 430s or 440s, but then later reworked in Gaul, probably at Auxerre, about the year 600. It is from this line of transmission that the surviving manuscripts descend.

The three earliest manuscripts which do survive of the Latin Martyrologium Hieronymianum as such are all relatively late, from the 8th century, which means they have inevitably suffered interference in the course of transmission. The oldest of them comes from the monastery of the Northumbrian missionary St Willibrord at Echternach and was written in England in the first years of the 8th century. Two other important manuscripts were written in the same century, one for the monastery of Saint Avoldus near Metz, and the other was copied by 772 AD for the monastery of Saint-Wandrille and then came to the monastery of St Peter in Wissembourg.

In 1894 the texts of the three manuscripts were juxtaposed in a publication contributed by Giovanni Battista de Rossi and Louis Duchesne to the monumental Acta Sanctorum, which prepared the way for a critical edition published by Henri Quentin in 1931 along with a historical commentary by the Bollandist Hippolyte Delehaye, again in connection with the Acta Sanctorum.

Scholars generally assume that in the lists of martyrs that head each day's entry, newer additions were added at the bottom of the lists, and thus the first names are most likely to be those from the lost earliest versions of the Martyrologium Hieronymianum.

== Contents ==
The material preserved in the Martyrologium Hieronymianum is such that highly specialist training is needed to evaluate it. Derived as the material often is from calendars, it is no surprise that the greater part of the entries contain only summary lists of names and places, for example: "On the third day before the Ides of January, at Rome, in the [catacomb] cemetery of Callixtus, on the Appian Way, was buried Miltiades, the bishop".

The first "historical" martyrologies, (containing a narrative history of the life of a saint), would not flower until the Carolingian period, starting with the martyrology of Bede.

== See also ==
- Martyrology of Usuard
- Florus of Lyon
- Ado of Vienne
- Rabanus Maurus – Carolingian author of martyrologies
- Notker Balbulus – Carolingian author of martyrologies
