= Door of Prophecies =

Door inside the Syrian Monastery in Wadi El Natrun in Egypt

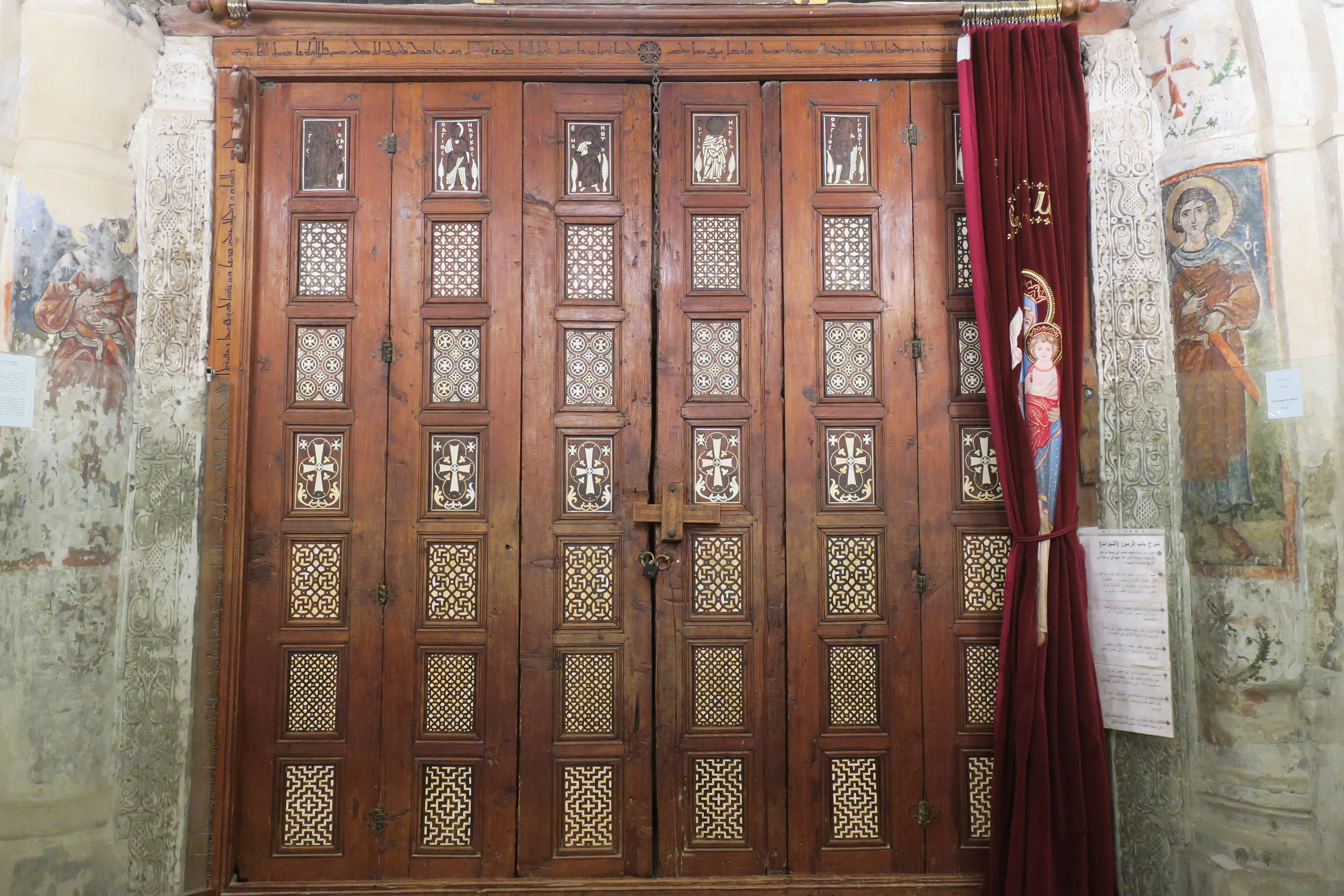
Complete view of the Door of Prophecies.

The Door of Prophecies or Gate of Prophecies is a large door inside the Syrian Monastery in Wadi El Natrun (Natron Valley) in northern Egypt. It features symbolic diagrams depicting the past and the future of the Christian faith through the eyes of Christian monks of the tenth century. The Door of Prophecies dates to the beginning of the tenth century, around 913–914 AD according to the Syriac language inscriptions on it, during the papacy of Pope Gabriel I of Alexandria (910–921), when the location was used mainly by Syrian monks. Today the monastery is used and preserved by Coptic monks and the Coptic Church, as both Churches have been in friendship and alliance since early Christianity. The panels on the large door divide and represent Christian epochs through time, from the early church to the predicted end times.

== Description ==
The door of prophecies is a screen of the main sanctuary inside the monastery. It consists of six vertical leaves (panels) and seven horizontal rows, three forming a valve on each side. Each one of the six leaves has seven panels of ebony magnificently inlaid with ivory, however, today some of the panels are not in their original condition. From top to bottom they represent seven epochs which are believed to cover the history of Christianity, its past and future, highlighting its golden age, periods of major changes, hardships, and persecution.

The historical and spiritual interpretations of the panels are highly individual. The following are the seven epochs:

Epoch	Image
First epoch, represented by the first row. In the centre, there are icons of Jesus Christ and the Holy Virgin. The other icons, on both sides, represent the strong relationship between the Coptic Orthodox Church of Alexandria and the Church of Antioch, i.e. the Coptic and Syrian patriarchates. The Syrian Orthodox Church of the earliest centuries of Christianity followed the leadership of the Church of Antioch. The monastery where the Door of Prophecies is located was built by Syrian monks. On the left are icons of St. Mark the Evangelist and Pope Dioscorus I of Alexandria, representing the Church of Alexandria. On the right are icons of St. Ignatius of Antioch and St. Severus of Antioch, representing the Church of Antioch. The order from left to right is St. Dioscorus, St. Mark, Jesus Christ, the Holy Virgin, St. Ignatius, St. Severus.	The first row represent the first epoch of Christianity.
Second epoch, represented by the second row. Rows of identical crosses intertwined surrounded with circle. They represent the first Christian era which is characterized by strong faith, unity of dogma and church, and the spread of Christianity despite the challenges of persecution.	The second row of the second epoch shows identical crosses surrounded by circles to symbolize the spread of Christianity despite persecution.
Third epoch, represented by the third row. Larger encircled crosses. These represent the Christian era during Roman rule under Constantine I, highly respected and favored by Christians when large Christian centers appeared around the world such as the Church of Alexandria, Church of Antioch, Church of Jerusalem, Church of Rome, and Church of Constantinople.	The third row of the third epoch shows six larger crosses representing the six major Churches of the world.
Fourth epoch, represented by the fourth row. Crosses surrounded with crescents, symbolizing the spread of Islam in Egypt and around the Middle East, the cradle of Christianity.	The fourth row of the fourth epoch shows crosses surrounded with adjoining crescents, to represent the spread of Islam.
Fifth epoch, represented by the fifth row. The swastikas depict the spread of Christianity to the Aryans or Western Europeans.	The fifth row of the fifth epoch shows swastikas to represent heresies and false doctrines.
Sixth epoch, represented by the sixth row. Small divided crosses in different forms represent the multitude and disorder of doctrines and beliefs.	The sixth row of the sixth epoch shows small divided crosses representing a multitude of doctrines and beliefs.
Seventh epoch, represented by the seventh row. The last row hints at the End Times for Christians, in one cross with a radiating design, filling the whole panel predicting the unity of the Christian faith.	The seventh row of the seventh epoch shows one cross with a radiating design, filling the whole panel predicting the unity of the Christian faith.
