= Forty-Nine Martyrs of Scetis =

Christian monks in Egypt killed by Berbers in 444

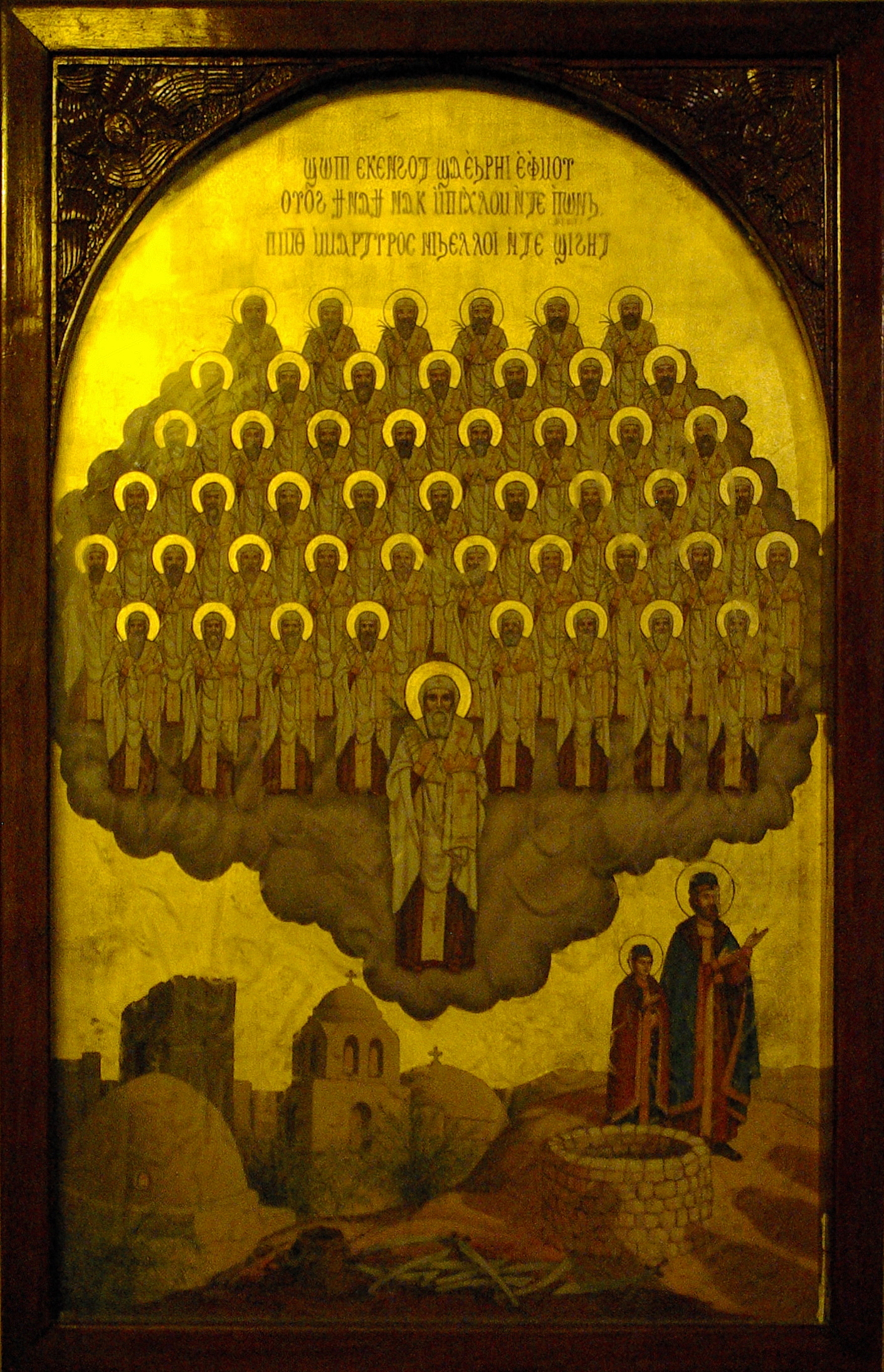
A Coptic icon of the 49 Martyrs of Scetis at the Monastery of Saint Macarius the Great in Wadi El Natrun

The Forty-Nine Martyrs of Scetis were Christian monks of the monasteries of Scetis in Roman Egypt who were massacred by Berbers during a raid in 444. Two laymen were martyred along with them. Their relics lie in the Monastery of Saint Macarius the Great. They are venerated in the Coptic Orthodox Church, but not in the Eastern Orthodox or Roman Catholic churches.

== Raid ==
The Berber raid took place during a period of general unrest in Egypt. Arsenius the Great fled to Canopus at about this time owing to raids by the Berber Mazices, while Nestorius was released from his imprisonment during a Blemmyan attack on the Kharga Oasis. The raid on Scetis also took place amidst a dispute between the monks and the Emperor Theodosios II over the emperor's desire for a male heir. Over three years earlier, the emperor wrote to the monks asking for their prayers, but the monk Isidhurus wrote back that God would deny him a son because of his heresy (dyophysitism). In 444, the emperor was estranged from his wife, Aelia Eudocia, according to the Chronicon paschale. According to the accounts of the Forty-Nine Martyrs, he was pressed by some advisers and by his sister Pulcheria to divorce her and remarry. He therefore sent a second letter to the monks of Scetis by the imperial courier Artemios.

The Berber raid fell on Scetis while Artemios was there with his son Dios. Although Isidhurus had died, the monks placed the imperial letter on his grave and received a negative reply. The monks then composed a response to the emperor and Artemios and Dios had begun their return journey when the raiders arrived. The hegoumenos John, the head of the monasteries, reportedly refused to take refuge in the Tower of Piamoun and invited the brothers to share in his fate. He and 48 other monks were killed. The rest took refuge in the tower. Artemios and Dios were also killed after Dios reportedly saw the monks receiving the heavenly crowns of martyrdom and convinced his father to turn back and share their fate.

The account of the Forty-Nine provides the earliest reference to the Tower of Piamoun at Scetis. It seems that the tower was constructed in response to raids of 407 and 434. It allowed life at Scetis to return to normal immediately after the raiders had retired because there was no general dispersal of monks as in prior attacks.

== Veneration ==
According to a late Arabic biography of Saint Pishoy, the raiders stopped at a spring near the monastery of Saint Pishoy to wash their swords and the spring was a source of miraculous healing thereafter. The martyrs were buried by their surviving brothers in a cave near the tower. Numerous miracles were reported at their grave and the Emperor Theodosios was so impressed that he built a martyrium for them in Constantinople. It was reports of their holiness that supposedly motivated Hilaria, daughter of the Emperor Zeno, to become a nun at Scetis.

In 538, Patriarch Theodosios I of Alexandria had their relics moved to a different cave and a chapel built over them. Following the Arab conquest of Egypt in 642, Patriarch Benjamin I visited their shrine and established the 5th of the month of Meshir in the Coptic calendar as their feast day. The relics were moved again when the chapel fell into ruin and a final time in 1773 when a wealthy patron, Ibrahim al-Jawhari, built a new church for them at Dayr Anba Maqar. Their relics remain their today. A chapel dedicated to the martyrs was built by Moses of Nisibis at Dayr al-Suryan in the 10th century.

The martyrs are commemorated in the Copto-Arabic Synaxarium on the 26th day of the month of Tobi (corresponding to January 21 in the Julian calendar). In the liturgy, they are referred to as "the forty-nine martyrs, the elders of Shiheet". The main source for the martyrdom of the Forty-Nine is the account in the Synaxarium itself. There is also a short notice of the burial and afterlife of the martyrs, the Coptic Depositio XLIX martyrum (Interment of the Forty-Nine Martyrs).

== Historicity ==
The historicity of the massacre is probable. The accounts contain circumstantial detail that, where it can be checked, is corroborated by other sources. Berber raiding was not uncommon in the Western Desert during the mid-5th century. The first consultation by Theodosios of the monks of Scetis is also mentioned in John of Nikiu's history (7th century), although he does not mention the second or the raid. The second, but not the first, is mentioned in Theopistos' life of Dioskoros of Alexandria (6th century). He mentions the dead Isidhurus, the hegoumenos John and the courier Artemios and his son, but does not mention the raid or massacre. It is probable that Theodosios' consultation of the monks and the massacre were distinct events separated in time that became conflated in the hagiographical tradition.
