= Peter Heyling =

German missionary to Egypt and Ethiopia

Peter Heyling (1607/1608 – c. 1652) was a German Lutheran missionary to Egypt and Ethiopia. He was the first Protestant missionary to Ethiopia.

The son of a goldsmith, Heyling was a native of the Hanseatic city of Lübeck. His early education was under Johann Kirchmann in Lübeck. Between 1628 and 1632 he studied theology and law at the University of Paris with four other Lübeckers. There he came under the influence of the Dutch Protestant Hugo Grotius, at that time living in Paris.

Heyling set out on his mission in 1632. His goal and that of six other student missionaries was to "reawaken the derelict churches of the Orient", that is, the Coptic and Ethiopian churches, "to genuine evangelical life". In the event, only Heyling and Hieronymus von Dorne ever set out. At the beginning of 1633 he arrived in Egypt, where he studied Arabic in Coptic monasteries and also in Jerusalem. In 1634, he accompanied the new Abuna, Marqos, as the latter travelled to Ethiopia to assume his new posting. He became an influential preacher and physician at the court of the Emperor Fasilides (1632–1667), but his efforts to reform the church resulted in major disputes over Christology. He translated the New Testament into Amharic.

There are various accounts of the manner in which Heyling met his death. One account is that he was expelled from Ethiopia around 1650, and died during his travel. Another version is that of the priest Abba Gorgoryos stating that the emperor allowed Heyling to travel to Cairo in 1652, where he died a martyr after refusing to renounce his faith to the Turkish pasha in Suakin. Gorgoryos adds to this account, dating from 1656, with the following words: "I have also heard this from the monks in Cairo, and I know of no other version. It is now four years since he died."

James Bruce on his travels through Ethiopia in 1770 claimed to see lingering signs of Heyling's influence. Samuel Gobat likewise, in 1830, found Heyling's translation of the New Testament still in circulation. In some respects, the Ethiopian Evangelical Church Mekane Yesus carries on his legacy.
